= List of shipwrecks in April 1941 =

The list of shipwrecks in April 1941 includes all ships sunk, foundered, grounded, or otherwise lost during April 1941.

== 1 April ==
List of shipwrecks: 1 April 1941
Ship	State	Description
Bertram Rickmers	Germany	World War II: The cargo ship was intercepted in the Red Sea by HMS Kandahar (Royal Navy) and was scuttled off "Gondurmiat".
Cerigo	Germany	World War II: The cargo ship was scuttled at Guayaquil, Ecuador. She was later salvaged and entered Ecuadorian service as 24 de Mayo.
Friesland	Germany	World War II: The cargo ship was scuttled off Paita, Peru (4°56′S 81°09′W) to avoid capture.
Hameln	Germany	World War II: The ship was scuttled at Veracruz, Mexico.
Hermonthis	Germany	World War II: The passenger ship was intercepted in the South Atlantic (12°13′S 80°10′W) by HMCS Prince Henry (Royal Canadian Navy) and was scuttled by her crew.
Hidlefjord	Norway	World War II: Convoy HX 114: The tanker was bombed and sunk in the Irish Sea 20 nautical miles (37 km) north west of the Smalls Lighthouse by Heinkel He 111 aircraft of Kampfgeschwader 27, Luftwaffe with the loss of 29 of her 34 crew.
Leipzig	Germany	World War II: The passenger ship was scuttled at Callao, Peru.
Leone	Regia Marina	World War II: The Leone-class destroyer ran aground on a reef off Massawa, Italian Eritrea and was scuttled by Pantera and Tigre (both Regia Marina). Two crew members were lost.
Lidingo	Sweden	World War II: The cargo ship struck a mine and was damaged in the Baltic Sea west of Falsterbo. She was beached, but was later refloated and towed to Malmö.
Monserrate	Germany	World War II: The passenger ship was scuttled at Callao. She was later refloated, repaired and entered Peruvian Navy service as Callao.
München	Germany	World War II: The passenger ship was intercepted in the Pacific Ocean 200 nautical miles (370 km) west of Callao (11°18′S 79°09′W) by HMCS Prince Henry (Royal Canadian Navy). She was set afire by her crew the next day and was shelled and sunk by BAP Almirante Grau (Peruvian Navy).
Orinoco	Germany	World War II: The ship was scuttled at Tampico, Mexico.
San Conrado	United Kingdom	World War II: Convoy HX 114: The tanker was bombed, machine gunned and damaged in the Irish Sea 13 nautical miles (24 km) north west of the Smalls Lighthouse by Heinkel He 111 aircraft of Kampfgeschwader 27, Luftwaffe. She was abandoned and later reboarded and taken in tow; but was bombed again and abandoned for a second time. San Conrado sank the next day 12 nautical miles (22 km) south of the Tuskar Rock.
Sesostris	Germany	World War II: The cargo ship was scuttled at Puerto Cabello, Venezuela.

== 2 April ==
List of shipwrecks: 2 April 1941
Ship	State	Description
Beaverdale	United Kingdom	World War II: Convoy SC 26: The cargo ship was torpedoed and sunk in the Atlantic Ocean (60°50′N 29°19′W) by U-46 (Kriegsmarine) with the loss of 22 of her 79 crew. Some of the survivors were rescued by the fishing trawler Gulltoppur ( Iceland), others reached land in their lifeboat. Beaverdale was on a voyage from Saint John, New Brunswick, Canada to Liverpool, Lancashire.
British Reliance	United Kingdom	World War II: Convoy SC 26: The tanker was torpedoed and sunk in the Atlantic Ocean (58°25′N 28°21′W) by U-46 (Kriegsmarine). All 50 people aboard were rescued by Tennessee (United Kingdom).
Coombe Dingle	United Kingdom	The coaster ran aground at Carnalea, County Down and was wrecked.
Coulouras Xenos	Greece	World War II: Convoy AS 23: The cargo ship was bombed and sunk in the Mediterranean Sea off Gavdos, Greece by Junkers Ju 88 aircraft of II Staffeln, Lehrgeschwader 1, Luftwaffe. Three of her crew were killed.
HMT Cramond Island	Royal Navy	World War II: The naval trawler was bombed and sunk in the North Sea 5 miles (8.0 km) off St Abb's Head Northumberland by Luftwaffe aircraft with the loss of five of her crew.
Fermain	United Kingdom	World War II: The coaster was bombed and sunk in the North Sea (50°35′N 0°52′E) by Luftwaffe aircraft. Her crew were rescued.
HMT Fortuna	Royal Navy	World War II: The 128.4-foot (39.1 m), 258.7-ton naval trawler was bombed and sunk in the North Sea 5 miles (8.0 km) off St Abb's Head Northumberland by Luftwaffe aircraft with the loss of all fifteen crew.
Giuseppe Mazzini	Italy	World War II: The cargo ship was bombed and sunk off Nocra, Italian Eritrea by Royal Air Force aircraft. She was later salvaged by the British and scrapped.
Homefield	United Kingdom	World War II: Convoy AS 23: The cargo ship was bombed and damaged in the Mediterranean Sea off Gavdos by Junkers Ju 88 aircraft of II Staffeln, Lehrgeschwader 1, Luftwaffe. She was scuttled by HMS Nubian (Royal Navy). Survivors were rescued by HMS Voyager (Royal Navy).
Karadjordje	Yugoslavia	World War II: The cargo ship struck a mine and sank in the Adriatic Sea off Šibenik. Her crew were rescued.
Melrose Abbey	United Kingdom	World War II: The cargo ship struck a mine and sank in the River Ythan, Aberdeenshire. She was refloated on 26 July and towed to Aberdeen.
Nestos	Greece	The cargo ship ran aground in Liverpool Bay 6 nautical miles (11 km) south of the Bar Lightship ( Trinity House) and was wrecked.
Prestolonasledik Petar	Yugoslavia	World War II: The cargo ship struck a mine and sank in the Adriatic Sea off Šibenik. Her crew were rescued.
Wild Rose	United Kingdom	World War II: The coastal tanker was bombed and damaged in the Irish Sea 12 nautical miles (22 km) south east of the Tuskar Rock. She was beached at Rosslare Harbour, County Wexford, Ireland. Later refloated and taken to Dublin.

== 3 April ==
List of shipwrecks: 3 April 1941
Ship	State	Description
Alderpool	United Kingdom	World War II: Convoy SC 26: The cargo ship was torpedoed and damaged in the Atlantic Ocean (58°21′N 27°59′W) by U-46 (Kriegsmarine). Her 39 crew abandoned ship and were rescued by Thirlby (United Kingdom). Alderpool was then torpedoed and sunk by U-73 (Kriegsmarine).
Assuan	United Kingdom	World War II: The coaster was bombed and damaged in the North Sea (56°42′N 2°26′W) and was beached 2 nautical miles (3.7 km) east of Scurdie Ness, Angus. She was refloated the next day and taken to Montrose, Angus.
HMS Bahram	Royal Navy	World War II: The river patrol boat struck a mine and sank in the North Sea off Spurn Point, Yorkshire with the loss of eight of her nine crew.
British Viscount	United Kingdom	World War II: Convoy SC 26: The tanker was torpedoed and sunk in the Atlantic Ocean (58°18′N 27°50′W) by U-73 (Kriegsmarine) with the loss of 28 of her 48 crew. Survivors were rescued by HMS Havelock (Royal Navy).
Cairnie	United Kingdom	World War II: The coaster was bombed and sunk in the North Sea approximately 7 nautical miles (13 km; 8.1 mi) south by west of Tod Head, Aberdeenshire by Luftwaffe aircraft. Her crew were rescued.
Cesare Battisti	Regia Marina	World War II: The Sauro-class destroyer suffered an engine breakdown in the Red Sea and was scuttled on the Arabian coast south of Jeddah, Saudi Arabia with the loss of one of her 182 crew.
Daniele Manin	Regia Marina	World War II: The Sauro-class destroyer was bombed and sunk in the Red Sea 10 nautical miles (19 km) off Port Sudan, Egypt by Fleet Air Arm aircraft. There were around 35 dead and 145 survivors.
Daphne	Finland	World War II: Convoy SC 26: The cargo ship was torpedoed and sunk in the Atlantic Ocean (approximately 60°N 20°W) by U-76 (Kriegsmarine) with the loss of eighteen of her crew. There were a few survivors.
Greenawn	United Kingdom	The coaster sank in the North Sea off Montrose.
Helle	Norway	World War II: Convoy SC 26: The cargo ship was torpedoed and sunk in the Atlantic Ocean (59°00′N 24°30′W) by U-98 (Kriegsmarine). Her 24 crew were rescued by HMS Havelock (Royal Navy).
Indier	Belgium	World War II: Convoy SC 26: The cargo ship was torpedoed and sunk in the Atlantic Ocean (58°12′N 27°40′W) by U-73 (Kriegsmarine) with the loss of 42 of her 46 crew.
Leonidas Z. Cambanis	Greece	World War II: Convoy SC 26: The cargo ship was torpedoed and sunk in the Atlantic Ocean (58°12′N 27°40′W) by U-74 (Kriegsmarine) with the loss of two of her 29 crew.
Nazario Sauro	Regia Marina	World War II: The Sauro-class destroyer was bombed and sunk in the Red Sea 10 nautical miles (19 km) off Port Sudan by Fleet Air Arm aircraft with the loss of 78 of her 173 crew.
Northern Prince	United Kingdom	World War II: Convoy ANF 24: The munitions ship was bombed and sunk in the Mediterranean Sea off Kythera, Greece (35°34′N 23°23′E) by Junkers Ju 88 aircraft of II Staffeln, Lehrgeschwader 1, Luftwaffe with the loss of three of her 110 crew.
Pantera	Regia Marina	World War II: The Leone-class destroyer was bombed and disabled in the Red Sea 10 nautical miles (19 km) off Port Sudan by Fleet Air Arm aircraft. Her hull was shelled and sunk by HMS Kingston (Royal Navy) on the Arabian coast south of Jeddah after her crew had gone ashore. One crew member was lost.
Thorn	Germany	World War II: The tanker was shelled, torpedoed and sunk in the Bay of Biscay 100 nautical miles (190 km) south west of Saint-Nazaire, Loire-Inférieure by HMS Tigris (Royal Navy). German ships rescued 33 survivors in the next few days. Casualties are not known.
Tigre	Regia Marina	World War II: The Leone-class destroyer was bombed and disabled in the Red Sea 10 nautical miles (19 km) off Port Sudan by Fleet Air Arm aircraft. Her hull was shelled and sunk by HMS Kingston (Royal Navy). Two crew members were killed and one died of wounds months later.
Urania	Italy	World War II: The cargo ship was bombed by aircraft and scuttled in the Red Sea off Dahlak Kebir, Italian Eritrea (40°00.19′N 10°39.52′E) to prevent capture by the British. The wreck was raised and scrapped in 1949.
Vatslav Vorovsky	Soviet Union	The cargo ship was driven ashore and wrecked at Cape Disappointment, Washington, United States.
Westpool	United Kingdom	World War II: Convoy SC 26: The cargo ship was torpedoed and sunk in the Atlantic Ocean (58°12′N 27°40′W) by U-73 (Kriegsmarine) with the loss of 35 of her 43 crew. Survivors were rescued by HMS Havelock (Royal Navy).

== 4 April ==
List of shipwrecks: 4 April 1941
Ship	State	Description
Adua	Italy	World War II: The cargo ship was scuttled at Massawa, Italian Eritrea. The wreck was scrapped in situ in 1950.
Arabia	Italy	World War II: The cargo ship was scuttled at Massawa. She was refloated on 11 April.
Athenic	United Kingdom	World War II: Convoy SC 26: The cargo ship straggled behind the convoy. She was torpedoed and damaged in the Atlantic Ocean (58°32′N 20°13′W) by U-73 (Kriegsmarine). Her 40 crew were rescued by HMS Arbutus (Royal Navy) and she sank the next day.
Brenta	Italy	World War II: The cargo ship was scuttled at Massawa. She was refloated in 1951 and scrapped.
HMS Buffalo	Royal Navy	World War II: The Trincola-class mooring vessel struck a mine and sank off Singapore with the loss of 32 of her 46 crew.
Cape Verde	United Kingdom	World War II: The cargo ship was bombed and damaged by Luftwaffe aircraft 40 nautical miles (74 km) north of The Smalls. She was subsequently repaired and returned to service.
Conus	United Kingdom	World War II: The tanker was torpedoed and sunk in the Atlantic Ocean (56°14′N 31°19′W) by U-97 (Kriegsmarine) with the loss of all 59 crew.
Crefeld	Germany	World War II: The cargo ship was scuttled at Massawa. The wreck was subsequently broken up in situ.
Frauenfels	Germany	World War II: The cargo ship was scuttled at Massawa. She was later salvaged by the British, repaired and entered service as Empire Niger.
Gera	Germany	World War II: The cargo ship was scuttled at Massawa. She was salvaged by the British in 1942, repaired and entered service as Empire Indus.
Giovanni Acerbi	Regia Marina	World War II: The torpedo boat, a former Giuseppe Sirtori-class destroyer, was sunk in port at Massawa by British aircraft.
Harbledown	United Kingdom	World War II: Convoy SC 26: The cargo ship was torpedoed and sunk in the Atlantic Ocean (58°24′N 23°20′W) by U-94 (Kriegsmarine) with the loss of sixteen of her 41 crew. Survivors were rescued by HMS Veteran (Royal Navy).
Imperio	Italy	World War II: The cargo ship was scuttled at Massawa. She was later salvaged.
Lichtenfels	Germany	World War II: The cargo ship was scuttled at Massawa. The wreck was scrapped in 1950.
Liebenfels	Germany	World War II: The cargo ship was scuttled at Massawa. She was later salvaged by the British, repaired and entered service as Empire Nile.
Marlene	United Kingdom	World War II: The cargo ship was torpedoed, shelled and sunk in the Atlantic Ocean (8°15′N 14°19′W) by U-124 (Kriegsmarine) with the loss of thirteen of her 60 crew.
Moncalieri	Italy	The cargo ship was scuttled at Massawa. She was later refloated and scrapped.
Oliva	Germany	World War II: The cargo ship was scuttled at Massawa. She was scrapped in situ in 1951.
Proussa	Hellenic Navy	World War II: The Kydoniai-class torpedo boat was bombed and sunk at Corfu by Italian aircraft. There were no casualties.
Romolo Gessi	Italy	World War II: The cargo ship was scuttled at Massawa. The wreck was scrapped in situ in 1951.
Salvus	United Kingdom	World War II: The cargo ship was bombed and sunk in the North Sea (53°05′N 1°27′E) by Luftwaffe aircraft with the loss of four of her 43 crew.
Sussanna	Greece	World War II: The coaster was bombed and sunk at Corfu by Luftwaffe aircraft.
Vesuvio	Italy	World War II: The cargo ship was scuttled at Massawa. The wreck was raised in April 1953 and scrapped in Italy.
HMS Voltaire	Royal Navy	World War II: Action of 4 April 1941: The armed merchant cruiser was shelled and sunk in the Atlantic Ocean (14°30′N 40°30′W) by Thor (Kriegsmarine) with the loss of 74 of her 269 crew. Survivors were rescued by Thor and made prisoners of war.
Welcombe	United Kingdom	World War II: Convoy SC 26: The cargo ship was torpedoed and sunk in the Atlantic Ocean (59°00′N 24°30′W) by U-98 (Kriegsmarine) with the loss of twenty of her 41 crew. Survivors were rescued by HMS Havelock (Royal Navy).
Whitby	United Kingdom	World War II: The 104.2-foot (31.8 m), 163.7-ton fishing trawler was bombed and sunk 3 nautical miles (5.6 km) south south east of the Blackwater Lightship ( Trinity House) by Luftwaffe aircraft. Her nine crew were rescued by drifter "Jacklyn" (United Kingdom).
XXIII Marzo	Italy	World War II: The cargo ship was scuttled at Massawa. She was later refloated and scrapped.

== 5 April ==
List of shipwrecks: 5 April 1941
Ship	State	Description
Ena de Larrinaga	United Kingdom	World War II: The cargo ship was torpedoed and sunk in the Atlantic Ocean (1°10′N 26°00′W) by U-105 (Kriegsmarine) with the loss of five of her 43 crew. Survivors were rescued by Almirante Alexandrio ( Brazil).
Rattray Head	United Kingdom	World War II: The coaster was bombed and sunk in the North Sea 8 nautical miles (15 km) east north east of Aberdeen by Luftwaffe aircraft with the loss of three of her crew.
St. Clement	United Kingdom	World War II: The coaster was bombed and sunk in the North Sea 20 nautical miles (37 km) south-east of Peterhead, Aberdeenshire (57°10′N 1°50′W) by Luftwaffe aircraft. A crew member was lost.
U-76	Kriegsmarine	World War II: The Type VIIB submarine was depth charged and sunk in the Atlantic Ocean south of Iceland (58°32′N 20°15′W) by HMS Arbutus, HMS Scarborough and HMS Wolverine (all Royal Navy) with the loss of one of her 43 crew. Survivors were taken as prisoners of war.

== 6 April ==
List of shipwrecks: 6 April 1941
Ship	State	Description
Antonia C.	Italy	World War II: The cargo ship was scuttled at Massawa, Italian Somaliland. She was scrapped in 1951.
Capitano Bottego	Italy	World War II: The cargo ship was scuttled off the Dahlak Islands, Italian Somaliland. She was salvaged in 1951 and scrapped.
HMS Comorin	Royal Navy	The armed merchant cruiser caught fire in the Atlantic Ocean (54°34′N 21°20′W) with the loss of 14 of her 419 crew. Survivors were rescued by HMS Broke, HMS Lincoln (both Royal Navy) and Glenartney (United Kingdom). HMS Comorin was scuttled by HMS Broke.
Daneland	United Kingdom	World War II: The 133.3-foot (40.6 m), 289.3-ton fishing trawler was bombed and sunk in the Irish Sea 30 miles north northwest of Rathlin Island, County Antrim by Luftwaffe aircraft. Her crew were rescued.
Dunstan	United Kingdom	World War II: The cargo ship was bombed and sunk in the Atlantic Ocean (59°09′N 8°22′W) by Focke-Wulf Fw 200 aircraft of the Luftwaffe with the loss of two crew. Survivors were rescued by HMS Boadicea (Royal Navy).
Georgios	Royal Hellenic Navy	World War II: Battle of Greece: The naval auxiliary was bombed and sunk at Piraeus by Luftwaffe aircraft.
Lincoln Ellsworth	Norway	World War II: The tanker was torpedoed and sunk in the Atlantic Ocean (62°37′N 27°06′W) by U-94 (Kriegsmarine). Her 29 crew were rescued by HMS Derbyshire and HMT Skyrock (both Royal Navy).
Lysefjord I	Norway	The coaster ran aground in Årdalsfjord and sank. All aboard survived.
Næraberg	Faroe Islands	World War II: The fishing trawler was bombed and sunk in the Atlantic Ocean (60°30′N 5°30′W) by Luftwaffe aircraft.
Nazario Sauro	Italy	World War II: The cargo ship was scuttled off the Dahlak Islands. She was refloated in 1948 and scrapped.
Nicolaou Zografia	Greece	World War II: The cargo ship was bombed and sunk in the Atlantic Ocean (57°10′N 12°30′W) by Luftwaffe aircraft. Her 31 crew were rescued by Eskimo (Royal Navy).
Olga S.	United Kingdom	World War II: The cargo ship was bombed and sunk in the Atlantic Ocean (55°48′N 9°45′W) by Luftwaffe aircraft with the loss of four of her 33 crew. Survivors were rescued by HMS Chelsea (Royal Navy).
Riv	Italy	World War II: The cargo ship was bombed and damaged in the Mediterranean Sea by Allied aircraft. She put in to Tripoli, Libya and was laid up.
Riva Ligure	Italy	World War II: The cargo ship was scuttled at Massawa. She was later salvaged.
HMY Surf	Royal Navy	World War II: Battle of Greece: The naval yacht was bombed and sunk at Piraeus by Luftwaffe aircraft.
HMS Torrent	Royal Navy	World War II: The naval yacht struck a mine and sank in the English Channel off Falmouth, Cornwall (50°05′N 4°57′W) with the loss of at least four of her crew.
Tripolitania	Italy	World War II: The cargo ship was scuttled off the Dahlak Islands. She was salvaged by the British in March 1943 and used as a storeship.
Viking	United Kingdom	World War II: Battle of Greece: The salvage vessel was bombed and sunk at Piraeus by Luftwaffe aircraft.

== 7 April ==
List of shipwrecks: 7 April 1941
Ship	State	Description
Acropolis	Greece	World War II: Battle of Greece: The cargo ship was sunk at Piraeus by Luftwaffe bombing, or by the explosion of Clan Fraser (United Kingdom). Her crew survived.
City of Roubaix	United Kingdom	World War II: Battle of Greece: The cargo ship was sunk at Piraeus by the explosion of Clan Fraser (United Kingdom). Her 94 crew survived.
Clan Fraser	United Kingdom	World War II: Battle of Greece: The Cameron-class steamship was bombed and set on fire at Piraeus by Heinkel He 111 aircraft of II Staffel, Kampfgeschwader 4, Luftwaffe on 6 April. Her cargo of TNT exploded, sinking her with the loss of six of her crew and wrecking the harbour.
Constantinos Loulandis	Greece	World War II: Battle of Greece: The cargo ship was bombed and sunk at Piraeus by Luftwaffe aircraft. She was refloated in 1942, repaired and entered German service as Lüneburg.
Cyprian Prince	United Kingdom	World War II: Battle of Greece: The cargo ship was damaged at Piraeus by Luftwaffe bombing and was beached at Salamis Island with the loss of four of her crew.
Elisabeth	United Kingdom	World War II: The coaster struck a mine and sank in the English Channel 5 nautical miles (9.3 km) east north east of Portscatho, Cornwall with the loss of ten of her crew.
Elpis	Greece	World War II: Battle of Greece: The tug was sunk at Piraeus by the explosion of Clan Fraser (United Kingdom).
Evoikos	Greece	World War II: Battle of Greece: The cargo ship was sunk at Piraeus by Luftwaffe bombing or the explosion of Clan Fraser (United Kingdom). She was later refloated, and was scrapped in 1948.
Halcyon	Greece	World War II: Battle of Greece: The caïque was sunk at Piraeus by Luftwaffe bombing, or by the explosion of Clan Fraser (United Kingdom).
Kyrapanagia II	Greece	World War II: Battle of Greece: The cargo ship was bombed and sunk at Piraeus by Luftwaffe aircraft.
Patris	Greece	World War II: Battle of Greece: The cargo ship was sunk at Piraeus by Luftwaffe bombing, or by the explosion of Clan Fraser (United Kingdom).
Petalli	Greece	World War II: Battle of Greece: The cargo ship was set on fire at Piraeus by Luftwaffe bombing, or by the explosion of Clan Fraser (United Kingdom). She was towed out of port and scuttled.
Portadoc	United Kingdom	World War II: The cargo ship was torpedoed and sunk in the Atlantic Ocean (7°17′N 16°53′W) by U-124 (Kriegsmarine). Her twenty crew reached French Guinea, where they were interned by Vichy French authorities.
HMT Roche Bonne	Royal Navy	World War II: The naval trawler was bombed and sunk in the English Channel 8 nautical miles (15 km) south south east of The Lizard, Cornwall by Luftwaffe aircraft with the loss of eleven of her crew.
Styliani	Greece	World War II: Battle of Greece: The cargo ship was sunk at Piraeus by Luftwaffe bombing, or by the explosion of Clan Fraser (United Kingdom).
Sylvia	United Kingdom	World War II: The 117.6-foot (35.8 m), 213-ton fishing trawler was bombed and sunk in the Atlantic Ocean off the Faroe Islands(61°27′N 5°48′W) by Luftwaffe aircraft with the loss of a crew member.

== 8 April ==
List of shipwrecks: 8 April 1941
Ship	State	Description
Ahamo	Hong Kong	World War II: The tanker struck a mine and sank in the North Sea off the coast of Norfolk, United Kingdom (53°22′N 0°59′E) with the loss of fourteen of her crew.
Ardita	Italy	World War II: The boat was scuttled at Massawa, Italian Eritrea.
Clelia Campanella	Italy	World War II: The tanker was scuttled at Massawa. She was later salvaged, repaired and entered British service as Empire Prize.
Colombo	Italy	World War II: The passenger ship was scuttled at Massawa. The wreck was scrapped in situ 1949-51.
Cormarsh	United Kingdom	World War II: The collier was bombed and damaged in the North Sea off Sheringham, Norfolk. She was subsequently repaired and returned to service.
Eskdene	United Kingdom	World War II: Convoy OG 57: The cargo ship was torpedoed and sunk in the Atlantic Ocean (34°43′N 24°21′W) by U-107 (Kriegsmarine). Her 39 crew were rescued by Penhale (United Kingdom).
Giove	Regia Marina	World War II: The tanker was scuttled at Massawa. She was later salvaged, repaired and entered British service as Empire Trophy.
Giuseppe Biglieri	Regia Marina	World War II: The Giovanni Berta-class naval trawler was scuttled at Massawa.
Helena Margareta	United Kingdom	World War II: The cargo ship was torpedoed and sunk in the Atlantic Ocean 330 nautical miles (610 km) west of Madeira, Portugal (33°00′N 23°52′W) by U-107 (Kriegsmarine) with the loss of 27 of her 36 crew Survivors were rescued by RFA Carndale (Royal Fleet Auxiliary).
MAS 204, MAS 206, MAS 210, MAS 213, and MAS 216	Regia Marina	World War II: The MAS 204-class motor torpedo boats were scuttled at Massawa.
Ostia	Regia Marina	World War II: The minelayer was bombed and sunk at Massawa by Royal Air Force aircraft.
Pirano	Italy	World War II: The tug was scuttled at Massawa. She was later salvaged.
Prometeo	Italy	World War II: The cargo ship was scuttled in the Dahlak Islands, Italian Somaliland. She was later refloated and scrapped.
San Giorgio	Italy	World War II: The coaster was scuttled at Massawa.
Sole	Italy	World War II: The boat was scuttled at Massawa.
Trieste	Italy	World War II: The coaster was scuttled at Massawa.
Tweed	United Kingdom	World War II: The cargo ship was torpedoed and sunk in the Atlantic Ocean (7°43′N 15°11′W) by U-124 (Kriegsmarine) with the loss of three of her 28 crew.
Vincenzo Giordano Orsini	Regia Marina	World War II: The Giuseppe Sirtori-class destroyer was scuttled at Massawa.

== 9 April ==
List of shipwrecks: 9 April 1941
Ship	State	Description
Buesten	Norway	World War II: The tanker (5,187 GRT, 1927) was bombed and sunk in the English Channel 4 nautical miles (7.4 km) south east of Berry Head, Devon, United Kingdom (50°21′07″N 3°24′11″W) by Luftwaffe aircraft with the loss of 28 of her 35 crew.
Craftsman	United Kingdom	World War II: The cargo ship was shelled and sunk in the Atlantic Ocean (0°32′N 23°37′W) by Kormoran (Kriegsmarine) with the loss of six of her 49 crew. Survivors were taken as prisoners of war.
HMT D'Arcy Cooper	Royal Navy	World War II: The 94.35-foot (28.76 m), 126.6-ton naval drifter/examination ship was bombed and sunk, or beached, at Harwich, Essex, by Luftwaffe aircraft with the loss of four of her crew. Later salvaged, but declared a total loss.
Dudley Rose	United Kingdom	World War II: The cargo ship was bombed and sunk in the English Channel 4 nautical miles (7.4 km) south east of Berry Head by a Heinkel He 111K aircraft of the Luftwaffe. Her sixteen crew were rescued.
Duffield	United Kingdom	World War II: The tanker was torpedoed and sunk in the Atlantic Ocean (31°13′N 23°40′W) by U-107 (Kriegsmarine) with the loss of 25 of her 53 crew.
Harpathian	United Kingdom	World War II: The cargo ship was torpedoed and sunk in the Atlantic Ocean (32°22′N 22°53′W) by U-107 (Kriegsmarine) with the loss of four of her 43 crew.
John Pyemont	Royal National Lifeboat Institution	World War II: The lifeboat was bombed and sunk at Tynemouth, Northumberland by Luftwaffe aircraft.
Lunula	United Kingdom	World War II: The tanker struck a mine and was damaged at Thameshaven, Essex, with the loss of 28 of her 39 crew. She was declared a constructive total loss.
HMT Marmion	Royal Navy	World War II: The auxiliary minesweeper was bombed and beached at Harwich by Luftwaffe aircraft. She was refloated on 10 May and eventually scrapped at Tilbury, Essex.
Prins Willem II	Netherlands	World War II: Convoy HX 117: The cargo ship straggled behind the convoy. She was torpedoed and sunk in the Atlantic Ocean (59°50′N 24°25′W) by U-98 (Kriegsmarine) with the loss of three of her 25 crew. Survivors were rescued by Klipparen (Sweden) and Tuscan Star (United Kingdom).
Sund	Germany	World War II: The coastal tanker struck a mine and sank in the Elbe.

== 10 April ==
List of shipwrecks: 10 April 1941
Ship	State	Description
A 2	Hellenic Navy	The A 1-class contraband chaser was lost on this date.
Alert	United Kingdom	World War II: The fireboat was bombed and damaged at Ipswich, Suffolk. She was declared a constructive total loss.
Circeo	Italy	World War II: The coaster was scuttled at Assab, Italian Eritrea.
Dante	Italy	World War II: The coaster was scuttled at Assab.
Greta	United Kingdom	World War II: The fireboat was bombed and sunk at Ipswich. She was declared a constructive total loss.
India	Italy	World War II: The cargo ship was scuttled at Assab. She was later salvaged.
Piave	Italy	World War II: The cargo ship was scuttled at Assab. She was later salvaged.
Queen	United Kingdom	World War II: The fireboat was bombed and sunk at Ipswich. She was refloated two days later.
Saleier	Netherlands	World War II: The cargo ship was torpedoed and sunk in the Atlantic Ocean (58°04′N 30°48′W) by U-52 (Kriegsmarine). Her 63 crew were rescued by USS Niblack (United States Navy).
Sannio	Italy	World War II: The cargo ship was scuttled at Assab. She was raised in 1947 and scrapped in Genoa, Italy from November 1950.
Scillin	Italy	World War II: The coaster was scuttled at Assab.
Sicilia II	Italy	World War II: The coaster was scuttled at Assab.

== 11 April ==
List of shipwrecks: 11 April 1941
Ship	State	Description
Aegeon	Greece	World War II: The cargo ship was torpedoed and sunk in the Atlantic Ocean (6°55′N 15°38′W) by U-124 (Kriegsmarine) with the loss of four of her 31 crew.
Attiki	Greece	World War II: The hospital ship was bombed and sunk at Piraeus by Luftwaffe aircraft with the loss of 23 of the 166 people aboard.
Draco	United Kingdom	World War II: The cargo ship was bombed and damaged at Tobruk, Libya by Junkers Ju 87 aircraft of III Staffeln, Sturzkampfgeschwader 1 and II Staffeln, Sturzkampfgeschwader 2, Luftwaffe and 96 & 236 Squadriglia, Regia Aeronautica. She was beached with the loss of a crew member. Draco was bombed again on 21 April and was declared a total loss. She was refloated in July 1948 and subsequently scrapped at Valencia, Spain.
HMT Othello	Royal Navy	World War II: The boom defence vessel struck a mine and sank in the Humber with the loss of eleven of her crew.
Retriever	United Kingdom	World War II: The cable layer was bombed and sunk in the Mediterranean Sea off Phleva Island, Greece by Junkers Ju 88 aircraft of III Staffeln, Lehrgeschwader 1, Luftwaffe with the loss of eleven of her 46 crew.
Senj	Yugoslavia	World War II: The coaster was scuttled to prevent capture at the Island of Krk. She was raised, repaired and put in Italian service.
Triglav	Yugoslavia	World War II: The coaster was scuttled to prevent capture at the Island of Krk. She was raised, repaired and put in Italian service.
Yorkshire Belle	Royal Navy	World War II: The boom tender struck a mine and sank in the Humber with the loss of four of her crew.

== 12 April ==
List of shipwrecks: 12 April 1941
Ship	State	Description
Arbel	Belgium	World War II: The coaster was bombed and sunk by Luftwaffe aircraft near the Longships Lighthouse, Cornwall, United Kingdom (50°06′N 05°46′W) with the loss of three of her crew.
Chicago	United Kingdom	World War II: The grain elevator ship was bombed and sunk at Millwall Docks, London by Luftwaffe aircraft.
Drava	Royal Yugoslav Navy	World War II: Invasion of Yugoslavia: The monitor was bombed and sunk by Luftwaffe aircraft off Čib with the loss of 54 of her 67 crew.
Kexholm	Sweden	World War II: The cargo ship was bombed and sunk in the Atlantic Ocean (59°50′N 8°22′W) by Focke-Wulf Fw 200 aircraft of I Staffeln, Kampfgeschwader 40, Luftwaffe. Her 35 crew were rescued.
Marie Maersk	United Kingdom	World War II: The tanker was bombed and sunk at Piraeus, Greece by Heinkel He 111 aircraft of II Staffeln, Kampfgeschwader 26, Luftwaffe. She was raised in March 1942 and towed to Trieste, Italy for repairs.
Morava	Royal Yugoslav Navy	World War II: Invasion of Yugoslavia: The monitor was scuttled to prevent capture. She was raised, repaired and put into Croatian Navy service.
Nicolaos D. L.	Greece	World War II: The cargo ship was shelled and sunk in the Atlantic Ocean (1°54′S 22°12′W) by Kormoran (Kriegsmarine). Her 35 crew were rescued and made prisoners of war.
Persiano	Italy	World War II: The tanker was torpedoed and sunk in the Mediterranean Sea 30 nautical miles (56 km) north east of Tripoli, Libya (33°29′N 14°01′E) by HMS Tetrarch (Royal Navy).
HMT Rypa	Royal Navy	The naval trawler foundered in Loch Ewe during a storm.
Sava	Royal Yugoslav Navy	World War II: Invasion of Yugoslavia: The monitor was scuttled to prevent capture. She was raised, repaired and put in Croatian Navy service.
St. Helena	United Kingdom	World War II: The cargo ship was torpedoed and sunk in the Atlantic Ocean (7°50′N 14°00′W) by U-124 (Kriegsmarine). Her 41 crew were rescued by HMS Wishart (Royal Navy). St. Helena was on a voyage from Montevideo, Uruguay to Hull, Yorkshire.
Vardar	Royal Yugoslav Navy	World War II: Invasion of Yugoslavia: The monitor was scuttled to prevent capture.

== 13 April ==
List of shipwrecks: 13 April 1941
Ship	State	Description
Brattdal	Norway	World War II: The cargo ship was bombed and severely damaged at Volos, Greece by Luftwaffe aircraft with the loss of one of her 28 crew. She was bombed again on 17 April and sank. She was salvaged in 1950–52. Subsequently repaired and sold.
City of Karachi	United Kingdom	World War II: The cargo ship was bombed and damaged at Volos by Luftwaffe aircraft and was beached. She was bombed again two days later and declared a total loss.
Corinthic	United Kingdom	World War II: The cargo ship was torpedoed and sunk in the Atlantic Ocean (8°10′N 14°40′W) by U-124 (Kriegsmarine) with the loss of two of her 41 crew. Survivors were rescued by Malvina (Netherlands).
HMS Rajputana	Royal Navy	World War II: The armed merchant cruiser was torpedoed and sunk in the Denmark Strait (64°50′N 27°25′W) by U-108 (Kriegsmarine) with the loss of 42 of her 325 crew. Survivors were rescued by HMS Legion (Royal Navy) and ORP Piorun (Polish Navy).

== 14 April ==
List of shipwrecks: 14 April 1941
Ship	State	Description
Conquérante	Free French Naval Forces	World War II: The Valliante-class gunboat was bombed and sunk at Falmouth, Cornwall by Luftwaffe aircraft.
RFA Pericles	Royal Fleet Auxiliary	World War II: Convoy AS 25: The tanker had been damaged in March during the Raid on Souda Bay, Crete, Greece when rammed by Italian explosive motor boats launched from the destroyers Francesco Crispi and Quintino Sella (both Regia Marina). Her cargo was salvaged and she was ordered to sail to Egypt. She broke in two in heavy seas (32°09′N 29°40′E). Her crew were rescued by HMS Grimsby (Royal Navy). Both sections were shelled and sunk.
Suippe	Free French Naval Forces	World War II: The Scarpe-class gunboat was sunk by Luftwaffe aircraft. She was raised, but was not repaired.
Trabzon	Turkey	World War II: The cargo ship was bombed and sunk at Laurium, Greece by Luftwaffe aircraft.
Ville de Liège	Belgium	World War II: The cargo ship was torpedoed and sunk in the Atlantic Ocean (59°50′N 29°30′W) by U-52 (Kriegsmarine) with the loss of 40 of her 52 crew.

== 15 April ==
List of shipwrecks: 15 April 1941
Ship	State	Description
Aquila	United Kingdom	World War II: The tug was bombed and sunk at Hull, Yorkshire by Luftwaffe aircraft.
Aurillac	United Kingdom	World War II: The cargo ship was torpedoed and sunk in the Atlantic Ocean (37°09′N 18°42′W) by Enrico Tazzoli (Regia Marina) with the loss of one of her 41 crew.
Clan Cumming	United Kingdom	World War II: The cargo ship struck a mine and sank in Eleusis Bay (37°49′N 28°38′E). All 110 people on board survived.
Goalpara	United Kingdom	World War II: the cargo ship was bombed and damaged in Eleusis Bay by Junkers Ju 88 aircraft of II Staffeln, Lehrgeschwader 1, Luftwaffe. She was beached. Her crew were rescued.
Luciano	Italy	World War II: The cargo shi was torpedoed and sunk at Vlorë, Albania by Fairey Swordfish aircraft of 815 Squadron, Fleet Air Arm.
Quiloa	United Kingdom	World War II: the cargo ship was bombed and damaged in Eleusis Bay by Junkers Ju 88 aircraft of II Staffeln, Lehrgeschwader 1, Luftwaffe. She was beached. Her 97 crew were rescued. She was abandoned as a total loss on 19 April. The wreck was taken into Skaramangas, Greece in November 1945.
Stampalia	Italy	World War II: The cargo ship was torpedoed and sunk at Vlorë by Fairey Swordfish aircraft of 815 Squadron, Fleet Air Arm.

== 16 April ==
List of shipwrecks: 16 April 1941
Ship	State	Description
Adana	Kriegsmarine	World War II: Battle of the Tarigo Convoy: The transport ship was shelled and sunk in the Mediterranean Sea off the Kerkennah Islands, Tunisia by HMS Jervis (Royal Navy).
Ægina	Kriegsmarine	World War II: Battle of the Tarigo Convoy: The transport ship was shelled and sunk in the Mediterranean Sea off the Kerkennah Islands by HMS Jervis and other vessels from the 14th Destroyer Flotilla (Royal Navy).^{[Note 1]}
Amiens	United Kingdom	World War II: The cargo ship was bombed and sunk in the Atlantic Ocean (50°25′N 5°35′W) by Luftwaffe aircraft. Her crew were rescued.
Anglesea Rose	United Kingdom	World War II: The cargo ship was bombed and sunk in the Atlantic Ocean (50°25′N 5°35′W) by Luftwaffe aircraft. Her crew were rescued.
Arta	Germany	World War II: Battle of the Tarigo Convoy: The cargo ship was shelled in the Mediterranean sea off the Kerkennah Islands by ships of the 14th Destroyer Flotilla, Royal Navy and was beached. She was destroyed with demolition charges on 26 April by HMS Upholder (Royal Navy).
Baleno	Regia Marina	World War II: Battle of the Tarigo Convoy: The Folgore-class destroyer was shelled and sunk in the Mediterranean sea by the 14th Destroyer Flotilla, Royal Navy.
Bolette	Norway	World War II: The cargo ship was bombed and sunk in the Atlantic Ocean (50°25′N 5°35′W) by Luftwaffe aircraft with the loss of eight crew.
Favorit	Norway	World War II: The cargo ship was bombed and sunk in the Atlantic Ocean (60°06′N 8°32′W) by aircraft of Kampfgeschwader 40, Luftwaffe. Her 23 crew were rescued by the fishing trawler Commander Horton (United Kingdom) and HMS Lincoln (Royal Navy).
Iserlohn	Germany	World War II: Battle of the Tarigo Convoy: The cargo ship was shelled and sunk in the Mediterranean Sea off the Kerkennah Islands by HMS Jervis, HMS Mohawk and HMS Nubian (all Royal Navy).
King Athelstan	United Kingdom	World War II: The fishing trawler was bombed and damaged in the Atlantic Ocean off Ballinskelligs, County Kerry, Ireland and was beached. She was later repaired and returned to service.
Lampo	Regia Marina	Lampo aground World War II: Battle of the Tarigo Convoy: The Folgore-class destroyer was shelled and heavily damaged in the Mediterranean sea by the 14th Destroyer Flotilla, Royal Navy. With 141 dead aboard, she ran aground in the action, but was subsequently repaired and returned to service.
Luca Tarigo	Regia Marina	World War II: Battle of the Tarigo Convoy: The Navigatori-class destroyer was shelled and sunk in the Mediterranean sea by the 14th Destroyer Flotilla, Royal Navy.
Memas	Greece	World War II: The cargo shipvwas bombed and sunk at Chalkis by Luftwaffe aircraft. Her crew survived.
HMS Mohawk	Royal Navy	HMS Mohawk sunk on her port side World War II: Battle of the Tarigo Convoy: The Tribal-class destroyer, part of the 14th Destroyer Flotilla, was torpedoed and sunk off the Kerkennah Islands by Luca Tarigo (Regia Marina) with the loss of 43 of her 219 crew.
Parnu	United Kingdom	The cargo ship collided with Fluor (United Kingdom) in the Atlantic Ocean 11 nautical miles (20 km) off Cape Wrath, Sutherland. She sank the next day.
Sabaudia	Italy	World War II: Battle of the Tarigo Convoy: The ammunition ship was shelled and sunk in the Mediterranean Sea off the Kerkennah Islands by HMS Jervis, HMS Mohawk and HMS Nubian (all Royal Navy).
Sir Ernest Cassel	Sweden	World War II: The cargo ship was shelled and sunk off the Azores, Portugal by Thor (Kriegsmarine). HEr crew were rescued and made prisoners of war.
Swedru	United Kingdom	World War II: The ship was bombed and damaged in the Atlantic Ocean (55°21′N 12°50′W) by Focke-Wulf Fw 200 aircraft of I Staffeln, Kampfgeschwader 40, Luftwaffe with the loss of 24 lives. She was scuttled by a Royal Navy ship on 19 April.

== 17 April ==
List of shipwrecks: 17 April 1941
Ship	State	Description
Damaskini	Greece	World War II: The cargo ship was bombed and sunk in the Aegean Sea north of Euboea by Luftwaffe aircraft.
Effra	United Kingdom	World War II: Convoy FS 464: The cargo ship (1,446 GRT) was torpedoed and sunk in the North Sea off the Cross Sands Lightship ( Trinity House) (52°44′N 1°58′E) by a Kriegsmarine schnellboot with the loss of two of her crew.
Ethel Radcliffe	United Kingdom	World War II: The cargo ship was torpedoed and damaged in the North Sea by a Kriegsmarine schnellboot. She was beached at Gorleston, Suffolk with no loss of life amongst her 40 crew. The ship was bombed a number of times and was declared to be beyond salvage on 20 May.
Montalto	United Kingdom	World War II: the cargo ship was bombed and sunk at Rochester, Kent by Luftwaffe aircraft.
Nereus	Netherlands	World War II: Convoy FS 464: The cargo ship (1,298 GRT, 1921) was torpedoed and sunk in the North Sea off Great Yarmouth, Norfolk by a Kriegsmarine schnellboot.
Petrakis Nomikos	Greece	World War II: The cargo ship was bombed and damaged at Piraeus by Luftwaffe aircraft. She was beached, but was later salvaged, repaired and entered German service as Wilhelmsburg.
Profit	Norway	World War II: The cargo ship struck a mine and sank in the North Sea off Clacton-on-Sea, Essex, United Kingdom (51°47′27″N 1°30′33″E) with the loss of twelve of her crew. HMS Wallace (Royal Navy) was one of the ships that rescued survivors. The wreck was subsequently dispersed by explosives.
Romagna	Italy	World War II: The barque was shelled and sunk in the Mediterranean Sea by HMS Greyhound (Royal Navy) and HMAS Voyager (Royal Australian Navy).
Vanna	Italy	World War II: The barque was shelled and sunk in the Mediterranean Sea off Apollonia, Libya by HMS Truant (Royal Navy).
Venezuela	Sweden	World War II: The cargo ship was torpedoed and sunk in the Atlantic Ocean by U-123 (Kriegsmarine) with the loss of all 41 crew and all eight survivors from Caroline Thordén (Finland).
Zagreb	Royal Yugoslav Navy	World War II: The destroyer was scuttled at Cattaro.
Zamzam	Egypt	World War II: The ocean liner was shelled and sunk in the South Atlantic (27°41′S 8°08′W) by Atlantis (Kriegsmarine) with only two serious injuries and the eventual loss of a life. Three hundred and twenty survivors were rescued by the Atlantis and transferred the next day to the Dresden (Kriegsmarine). After four weeks cruising the mid-Atlantic, the ship made a dash for France, on 20 May landing at Saint-Jean-de-Luz, Basses-Pyrénées, France.

== 18 April ==
List of shipwrecks: 18 April 1941
Ship	State	Description
British Science	United Kingdom	World War II: The tanker was bombed and sunk in the Kithera Channel (36°06′N 24°00′E) by Savoia-Marchetti SM.79 aircraft of 281 Squadriglia, Regia Aeronautica. Her 47 crew were rescued by HMS Hero (Royal Navy).
Champenois	France	The cargo ship was driven ashore 20 nautical miles (37 km) south west of Casablanca, Morocco. She was declared a total loss.
Chios	Greece	World War II: The cargo ship was bombed and sunk at Eretria by Luftwaffe aircraft.
HMS Fiona	Royal Navy	World War II: The troopship was bombed and sunk in the Mediterranean Sea 50 nautical miles (93 km) north west of Sidi Barani, Egypt by Junkers Ju 87 aircraft of III Staffeln, Sturzkampfgeschwader 1 and II Staffeln, Sturzkampfgeschwader 2, Luftwaffe and 96 & 236 Squadriglia, Regia Aeronautica with the loss of 53 of her crew.
Fokion	Greece	World War II: The cargo ship was bombed and sunk off Psara by Luftwaffe aircraft. Two of her crew were killed.
Franco Martelli	Italy	World War II: The tanker was torpedoed and sunk in the Mediterranean Sea (46°31′N 8°46′E) by HMS Urge (Royal Navy).
Juna	United Kingdom	World War II: The cargo ship was bombed and sunk by Axis aircraft off Sidi Barani.
Leon	Greece	World War II: The cargo ship was bombed and sunk off Psara by Luftwaffe aircraft.
Moscha L. Goulandris	Greece	World War II: The cargo ship was bombed and damaged off Chalkis by Luftwaffe aircraft and was beached. After further bombing on 20 and 23 April she was declared a total loss.
Panduah	United Kingdom	The flat sank under tow at 19°15′N 86°53′E.
V-709 Guido Möhring	Kriegsmarine	World War II: The vorpostenboot was torpedoed and sunk in the Bay of Biscay near "Port Ley".
HMT Young Ernie	Royal Navy	The naval trawler collided with another vessel and sank in the River Tyne.

== 19 April ==
List of shipwrecks: 19 April 1941
Ship	State	Description
Chu Tai	Republic of China Navy	Second Sino-Japanese War: The Chu Yu-class gunboat, beached off Nankang, Fukien, since 1 June 1938, was destroyed there by Japanese aircraft.
Fravis	United Kingdom	World War II: The dredger was bombed and sunk at Langstone, Hampshire by Luftwaffe aircraft.
HMT Kopanes	Royal Navy	World War II: The naval trawler was bombed and sunk in the North Sea off the coast of Northumberland by Luftwaffe aircraft.
M-1101	Kriegsmarine	World War II: The auxiliary minesweeper was torpedoed and sunk in the North Sea (58°40′N 4°55′E) by Minerve (Free French Naval Forces).
Margit	Panama	World War II: The cargo ship was bombed and sunk at Kalkara Creek, Malta by Luftwaffe aircraft.
Samos	Kriegsmarine	World War II: The transport ship struck a mine and sank in the Mediterranean Sea. Also reported as being torpedoed and sunk off Benghazi, Libya by HMS Truant (Royal Navy) on 17 April.
Teti Nomikos	Greece	World War II: The cargo ship was bombed and sunk at Chalkis by Luftwaffe aircraft.

== 20 April ==
List of shipwrecks: 20 April 1941
Ship	State	Description
Assimina Baika	Greece	World War II: The cargo ship was bombed and sunk at Politika by Luftwaffe aircraft.
Ben Aden	United Kingdom	World War II: The fishing trawler sank after a collision in the St George's Channel.
Chryssoroi	Greece	World War II: The coastal tanker was bombed and sunk at Fleva by Luftwaffe aircraft.
Empire Endurance	United Kingdom	World War II: The cargo liner was torpedoed and sunk in the Atlantic Ocean south west of Rockall (53°05′N 23°14′W) by U-73 (Kriegsmarine with the loss of 66 of the 95 people aboard. Survivors were rescued by HMS Trillium (Royal Navy).
George A. Dracoulis	Greece	World War II: The cargo ship was bombed and sunk by Luftwaffe aircraft.
Harry	United Kingdom	World War II: The barge was bombed and sunk at Shadwell, London by Luftwaffe aircraft. She was later raised and scrapped.
HMS HDML-10036, and HMS HDML-10371	Royal Navy	World War II: The harbour defence motor launches were lost when Empire Endurance (United Kingdom) was torpedoed and sunk.
Ithaki	Greece	World War II: The passenger ship was bombed and sunk in Suda Bay by Luftwaffe aircraft.
Moschanthi	Greece	World War II: The coaster was bombed and sunk at Aigio by Luftwaffe aircraft.
Percy	United Kingdom	World War II: The barge was bombed and sunk at Shadwell by Luftwaffe aircraft.
Psara	Royal Hellenic Navy	World War II: The Freccia-class destroyer was bombed and sunk in the Saronic Gulf by Luftwaffe aircraft.
Pteroti	Greece	World War II: The coaster was bombed and sunk at Chalkis by Luftwaffe aircraft.
R. S. Jackson	United Kingdom	The spritsail barge was bombed and sunk at London by Luftwaffe aircraft. She was later raised and scrapped.
HMT Topaze	Royal Navy	The Gem-class trawler was rammed and sunk off the mouth of the Clyde by HMS Rodney (Royal Navy) with the loss of eighteen of her crew.
Vasilefs Georgios	Royal Hellenic Navy	World War II: The Vasilefs Georgios-class destroyer was scuttled in the Salamis Naval Base to prevent capture by German forces. She was raised, repaired and put into Kriegsmarine service as ZG3 Hermes.
Ypanis	Greece	World War II: The cargo ship was bombed and sunk at Chalkis by Luftwaffe aircraft. She was beached, but was later salvaged, repaired and entered German service.

== 21 April ==
List of shipwrecks: 21 April 1941
Ship	State	Description
Archon	Greece	World War II: The cargo ship was bombed and sunk at Euboea by Luftwaffe aircraft.
Bankura	United Kingdom	World War II: The cargo ship was bombed and damaged at Tobruk, Libya by Junkers Ju 87 aircraft of III Staffeln, Sturzkampfgeschwader 1 and II Staffeln, Sturzkampfgeschwader 2, Luftwaffe and 96 & 236 Squadriglia, Regia Aeronautica. After further damage in subsequent air raids she was declared a total loss. She was refloated in 1950 and scrapped at Tobruk.
British Renown	United Kingdom	World War II: The tanker was bombed and damaged by Luftwaffe aircraft 3 nautical miles (5.6 km) south east of Dartmouth, Devon. She was subsequently repaired and returned to service.
Calchas	United Kingdom	World War II: The cargo ship was torpedoed and sunk in the Atlantic Ocean (23°50′N 27°00′W) by U-107 (Kriegsmarine) with the loss of 24 of the 113 people aboard.
Esperos	Greece	The hospital ship was bombed and sunk at Missolonghi by Luftwaffe aircraft.
Ioanna	Greece	World War II: The cargo ship was bombed and sunk at Patras by Luftwaffe aircraft.
Prometeo	Italy	World War II: The tanker was attacked in the Mediterranean Sea off Tripoli, Libya, by HMS Truant (Royal Navy) and ran aground whilst evading her torpedoes. She was later salvaged, repaired and returned to service.
Regency	United Kingdom	World War II: The tug struck a mine and sank in the Thames Estuary at Dagenham, Essex along with three or four barges. Two lives were lost. The tug and one of the barges were later raised, repaired and returned to service.
Thyella	Royal Hellenic Navy	World War II: The Thyella-class destroyer was sunk by enemy action off Vouliagmeni near Athens.
Urania	United Kingdom	World War II: The cargo ship was bombed and sunk at Tobruk by Junkers Ju 87 aircraft of III Staffeln, Sturzkampfgeschwader 1 and II Staffeln, Sturzkampfgeschwader 2, Luftwaffe and 96 & 236 Squadriglia, Regia Aeronautica. She was later refloated, and was in use as a temporary wharf in 1950.

== 22 April ==
List of shipwrecks: 22 April 1941
Ship	State	Description
HMS A.16	Royal Navy	World War II: The A lighter was bombed and damaged in the Mediterranean Sea off Megara by Luftwaffe aircraft when they attacked the beached HMS York (Royal Navy). She was scuttled on 2 June.
Aghios Markos	Greece	World War II: The cargo ship was bombed and sunk at Peristeri by Luftwaffe aircraft.
Aliakmon	Royal Hellenic Navy	World War II: The Aliakmon-class trawler/auxiliary minelayer was sunk in Corinth Bay by Luftwaffe aircraft.
Athinai	Greece	World War II: The coaster was bombed and sunk at Itea by Luftwaffe aircraft.
Avlis	Greece	World War II: The coaster was bombed and sunk at Rafina by Luftwaffe aircraft.
Blenheim	Kriegsmarine	The troopship caught fire and sank in the Porsangerfjorden, Norway with the loss of 138 of the 286 people aboard. The wreck was salvaged in 1946 and scrapped in 1948.
Coronation of Leeds	United Kingdom	World War II: The steam barge struck a mine in the Thames Estuary off Thames Haven, Essex and sank with the loss of all three crew.
Darmas	Greece	World War II: The cargo ship was bombed and sunk in the Gulf of Patras by Luftwaffe aircraft.
Frinton	Greece	World War II: The cargo ship was bombed and sunk at Megalo Pefko by Luftwaffe aircraft.
Hydra	Royal Hellenic Navy	World War II: The Freccia-class destroyer was bombed and sunk in the Saronic Gulf b Junkers Ju 87 Stuka dive bombers of they Luftwaffe with the loss of 42 of her crew.
Ioannis Nomicos	Greece	World War II: The coaster was bombed and sunk in the Gulf of Corinth off Rhion by Luftwaffe aircraft.
Kriti	Greece	World War II: The cargo ship was bombed and sunk at Antirion by Luftwaffe aircraft. There were no casualties. She was later refloated and taken to Italy.
Messarya Nomikos	Greece	World War II: The cargo ship was bombed and sunk at Nafpaktos by Luftwaffe aircraft. She was later salvaged by the Germans and repaired.
Miss Elaine	United Kingdom	World War II: The salvage vessel was bombed and sunk at Plymouth, Devon by Luftwaffe aircraft. She was raised on 14 May, repaired and returned to service.
Obra	Germany	World War II: The coaster struck a mine and sank in the Baltic Sea off Greifswald.
Pancration	Greece	World War II: The cargo ship was bombed and sunk at Milos by Luftwaffe aircraft.
Sea-Serpent	United Kingdom	World War II: Battle of Greece: The yacht was bombed and sunk by Luftwaffe aircraft in the Aegean Sea between Syros and Souda.
Sokratis	Greece	World War II: The hospital ship was bombed and sunk in the Gulf of Corinth at Antikyra by Luftwaffe aircraft with the loss of one life.
Teti	Greece	World War II: The cargo ship was bombed and damaged in Greek waters by Luftwaffe aircraft. She was beached to prevent her sinking.
Thassos	Greece	World War II: The cargo ship was bombed and sunk at Megara by Luftwaffe aircraft.
Thedol 2	Greece	World War II: The coastal tanker was bombed, set on fire and sunk in the Gulf of Corinth at Antikyra by Luftwaffe aircraft.
Theodora	Greece	World War II: The tanker caught fire, burned out and sank in the Gulf of Corinth at Antikyra as a result of Thedol 2 (Greece) being bombed by Luftwaffe aircraft and set on fire. Ten of her crew were killed.
Thraki	Greece	World War II: the cargo ship was bombed and sunk in the Gulf of Corinth at Sombraina by Luftwaffe aircraft.
Vita	United Kingdom	World War II: The hospital ship was bombed and severely damaged in the Mediterranean Sea off Tobruk, Libya by Junkers Ju 87 aircraft of III Staffeln, Sturzkampfgeschwader 1 and II Staffeln, Sturzkampfgeschwader 2, Luftwaffe and 96 & 236 Squadriglia, Regia Aeronautica. HMAS Waterhen (Royal Australian Navy) rescued 498 people.

== 23 April ==
List of shipwrecks: 23 April 1941
Ship	State	Description
Alberta	Greece	World War II: The passenger ship was bombed and sunk in the Saronic Gulf off Salamis Island by Luftwaffe aircraft. Six crew and four gunners were killed. There were 29 survivors.
Assimi	Greece	World War II: The coaster was bombed and sunk at Krioneri, near Chalkeia by Luftwaffe aircraft. There were no casualties.
Athina S.	Greece	World War II: The coaster was bombed and sunk at Psathopirgos by Luftwaffe aircraft. There were no casualties. She was later refloated.
Doris	Royal Hellenic Navy	World War II: The Alcyon-class torpedo boat was scuttled at Porto Rafti.
Elvira	Greece	World War II: The coaster was bombed and sunk at Chalkis by Luftwaffe aircraft. There were no casualties.
Ellenis	Greece	World War II: The hospital ship was bombed and sunk. She was later raised, then bombed and sunk by aircraft while under repairs at Naples, Italy in June 1943.
Hydra	Greece	World War II: The coaster was bombed and sunk at Megara by Luftwaffe aircraft. There were no casualties.
Katerina	Greece	World War II: The tanker was bombed and sunk at Methana by Luftwaffe aircraft.
Kerkyra	Greece	World War II: The passenger ship was bombed and sunk at Salamis Naval Base by Luftwaffe aircraft. There were no casualties.
Kilkis	Royal Hellenic Navy	Kilkis, with Lemnos in the background World War II: The Mississippi-class battleship was bombed and sunk at Salamis Naval Base by Luftwaffe aircraft.
Kios	Royal Hellenic Navy	World War II: Battle of Greece: The Kydoniai-class torpedo boat was damaged in Vouliagmeni Bay, near Athens by Luftwaffe aircraft and was then scuttled. Two of her crew were killed and three were wounded.
Korgialenios	Royal Hellenic Navy	World War II: The auxiliary minelayer was sunk off Corfu by Luftwaffe aircraft without casualty. She was later salvaged and put in German service as UJ-2110.
Kyma	Greece	World War II: The coaster was bombed near Patras by Luftwaffe aircraft and sank the next day in the port from damage suffered from near misses. There were no casualties. She was later raised by the Italians and put in service.
Lemnos	Royal Hellenic Navy	World War II: The barracks ship, a disarmed former Mississippi-class battleship was bombed and sunk at Salamis Naval Base by Luftwaffe aircraft.
Macedonia	Greece	World War II: The cargo ship was bombed and sunk at Trisonia-Spilia, Patras by Luftwaffe aircraft. A crew member was killed.
Marigo Matsas	Greece	World War II: The tug was bombed and sunk at Piraeus by Luftwaffe aircraft. A crew member was killed.
Nestos	Royal Hellenic Navy	World War II: The Aliakmon-class trawler/auxiliary minelayer was bombed and sunk by Luftwaffe aircraft at Psathopyrgos. Her crew, that had suffered fifteen wounded in air attacks on the two previous days, had gone ashore and there were no casualties.
Nicolaos Nomicos	Greece	World War II: The coaster was bombed and sunk at Trisonia-Spilia by Luftwaffe aircraft. She was later refloated by the Germans and towed to Piraeus, where she was scrapped.
Nicolaou Georgios	Greece	World War II: The cargo ship was bombed and sunk in the Gulf of Nauplia by Luftwaffe aircraft. There were no casualties.
Paralos	Royal Hellenic Navy	World War II: The auxiliary minelayer was sunk at Vouliagmeni by Luftwaffe aircraft. She was salvaged and put in German service as UJ-2103.
Policos	Greece	World War II: The hospital ship was bombed and sunk at Methana by Luftwaffe aircraft.
Ponta Verde	Brazil	The tanker was driven ashore on Straggler Island, in the Strait of Magellan off Santiago, Chile. She broke in three and was wrecked.
Santa Clara Valley	United Kingdom	World War II: The cargo ship was bombed and sunk in Nauplia Bay by Luftwaffe aircraft with the loss of seven of the 97 people on board. She was refloated on 1 October 1952 and subsequently scrapped.
Sifnos	Greece	World War II: The coaster was bombed and sunk off Melos by Luftwaffe aircraft. Four of her nine crew were killed.
Stathis A.	Greece	World War II: The coaster was bombed and sunk at Megara by Luftwaffe aircraft. There were no casualties.
Tenedos	Royal Hellenic Navy	World War II: The naval tug was sunk in Saronis Bay by Luftwaffe aircraft. She was salvaged and put in German service as UJ-2106.

== 24 April ==
List of shipwrecks: 24 April 1941
Ship	State	Description
A 4	Royal Hellenic Navy	The A 1-class contraband chaser was lost on this date.
Aigli	Royal Hellenic Navy	World War II: The Alcyon-class torpedo boat was scuttled in Saronis Bay.
Alkyoni	Royal Hellenic Navy	World War II: The Alcyon-class torpedo boat was scuttled in Vouliagmeni Bay.
Andros	Greece	World War II: The hospital ship was bombed and sunk in the Gulf of Corinth off Loutraki by Luftwaffe aircraft with the loss of three lives.
Arethousa	Royal Hellenic Navy	World War II: The Alcyon-class torpedo boat was scuttled off Varkiza.
HMY Calanthe	Royal Navy	World War II: The armed yacht was bombed and sunk off Milos, Greece by Luftwaffe aircraft.
Cavallo	United Kingdom	World War II: The cargo ship was bombed and damaged at Nauplia, Greece by Luftwaffe aircraft. She sank the next day. Her 40 crew survived.
Egeo	Regia Marina	World War II: The armed merchant cruiser was shelled and sunk in the Mediterranean Sea 80 nautical miles (150 km) off Tripoli, Libya by HMS Jaguar, HMS Janus, HMS Jervis and HMS Juno (all Royal Navy). Only 36 of her 120 crew survived.
Hellas	Greece	World War II: The cargo ship was bombed and sunk at Piraeus by Luftwaffe aircraft with the loss of one life.
Kehrea	Greece	World War II: The cargo ship was bombed and sunk in the Bay of Frangolimano by Luftwaffe aircraft. There were no casualties.
Kyriaki	Greece	World War II: The cargo ship was bombed and sunk at Suda Bay by Luftwaffe aircraft. Her crew survived.
Manna	Greece	World War II: The coaster was bombed and sunk at Aedipsos by Luftwaffe aircraft. There were no casualties.
Petros	Greece	World War II: The coaster was bombed and sunk at Porto Heli by Luftwaffe aircraft. There were no casualties. She was refloated by the Germans and scrapped at Piraeus.
Popi S	Greece	World War II: The cargo ship was bombed and sunk at Milos by Luftwaffe aircraft with the loss of four lives.
Pylaros	Greece	World War II: The cargo ship was bombed and sunk at Galaxeidion by Luftwaffe aircraft. There were no casualties.
HMS Rover	Royal Navy	World War II: The Rainbow-class submarine was bombed and damaged at Suda Bay by Luftwaffe aircraft and was beached. Later repaired and returned to service.
Simone Schiaffino	Regia Marina	World War II: The torpedo boat — a former Rosolino Pilo-class destroyer — struck an Italian mine and sank in the Mediterranean Sea off Cape Bon, Tunisia.
Spetsai	Greece	World War II: The cargo ship was bombed and sunk in the Gulf of Corinth off Psathopyrgos by Luftwaffe aircraft. There were no casualties.
Ulster Prince	United Kingdom	World War II: Operation Demon: The troopship ran aground at Nauplia, Greece. She was bombed the next day by Luftwaffe aircraft and gutted by fire.

== 25 April ==
List of shipwrecks: 25 April 1941
Ship	State	Description
Anna Maria	Greece	World War II: The coaster was bombed and sunk at Aigio by Luftwaffe aircraft.
Antonietta Lauro	Italy	World War II: The troopship was torpedoed and sunk in the Mediterranean Sea off the Kerkennah Islands, Tunisia by HMS Upholder (Royal Navy).
Dimitrios Nomikos	Greece	World War II: The cargo ship was bombed and sunk at Karystos by Luftwaffe aircraft. She was later salvaged by the Germans, repaired and entered German service.
Empire Light	United Kingdom	World War II: The cargo ship was torpedoed and sunk off the Seychelles by Pinguin (Kriegsmarine).
Kyzikos	Royal Hellenic Navy	World War II: The Kidonia-class torpedo boat was sunk at Salamis by Luftwaffe aircraft.
Marios	Greece	World War II: The coaster was bombed and sunk at Aigio by Luftwaffe aircraft.
Pennland	United Kingdom	World War II: Operation Demon: The troopship was bombed and damaged off San Giorgio Island by Luftwaffe aircraft with the loss of four of her crew. HMS Griffin (Royal Navy) rescued about 350 people and sank Pennland by gunfire.
Pergamos	Royal Hellenic Navy	World War II: Battle of Greece The Kidonia-class torpedo boat was scuttled at Salamis Naval Base. (One source claims she was bombed and sunk at Salamis Naval Base by Luftwaffe aircraft on 24 April 1941).
Pleias	Royal Hellenic Navy	World War II: The auxiliary survey ship/minelayer was sunk off Missolonghi by Luftwaffe aircraft.
Polyana	Norway	World War II: Convoy OG 58: The cargo ship was torpedoed and sunk in the Atlantic Ocean (approximately 12°45′N 28°21′W) by U-103 (Kriegsmarine) with the loss of all 25 crew.
Sofia	Greece	World War II: The cargo ship was bombed and sunk at Megara by Luftwaffe aircraft.
Thraki	Greece	World War II: The cargo ship was bombed and sunk at Porto Heli by Luftwaffe aircraft.
Thraki	Greece	World War II: The yacht was bombed and sunk at Myli by Luftwaffe aircraft.

== 26 April ==
List of shipwrecks: 26 April 1941
Ship	State	Description
André Moyrand	France	World War II: The cargo ship was torpedoed and sunk in the Atlantic Ocean west north west of Achill Head, County Mayo, Ireland by U-110 (Kriegsmarine).
Athanassios	Greece	World War II: The passenger/cargo ship was bombed, machine gunned and sunk in Plytra Bay, Laconian Bay, Peloponnese, Greece by German aircraft. The wreck was partially salvaged post war.
Kydoniai	Royal Hellenic Navy	World War II: The Kydoniai-class torpedo boat was bombed and sunk at Morea by Luftwaffe aircraft. The wreck was salvaged from 1948 to 1952.
Lapponia	Finland	World War II: The cargo ship struck a mine and sank at Aalborg, Denmark. She was later raised, repaired and returned to service.
Maiotis	Greece	World War II: The cargo ship was bombed and sunk in the Aegean Sea by Luftwaffe aircraft. She was later raised, and was scrapped at Venice, Italy, in 1949.
Maria Stathatos	Greece	World War II: The cargo ship was bombed and sunk at Myloi by Luftwaffe aircraft.
Mountpark	United Kingdom	World War II: The cargo ship was bombed and sunk in the Atlantic Ocean (56°17′N 12°21′W) by Focke-Wulf Fw 200 aircraft of I Staffeln, Kampfgeschwader 40, Luftwaffe with the loss of six of her 41 crew. Mountpark was on a voyage from Bahia Blanca, Brazil to Manchester, Lancashire.
Murdoch	United Kingdom	The cargo ship struck a submerged wreck, sprang a leak, and ran aground on the Scroby Sands, Norfolk. She was on a voyage from Sunderland, County Durham to London. She broke in two and sank.
Point Judith	Greece	World War II: The cargo ship was bombed and sunk at Kythnos by Luftwaffe aircraft. Her crew was rescued.
Zakynthos	Greece	World War II: The cargo ship was bombed and sunk off Monemvasia by Luftwaffe aircraft.

== 27 April ==
List of shipwrecks: 27 April 1941
Ship	State	Description
Astir	Greece	World War II: The cargo ship was bombed and sunk at Kapsalion by Luftwaffe aircraft. There were no casualties.
Beacon Grange	United Kingdom	World War II: The cargo ship was torpedoed and sunk in the Atlantic Ocean (62°05′N 16°20′W) by U-552 (Kriegsmarine) with the loss of two of her 84 crew. Survivors were rescued by the fishing trawler Edouard Anseele (Belgium) and HMS Gladiolus (Royal Navy). Beacon Grange was on a voyage from the River Tyne to Buenos Aires, Argentina.
Celte	United Kingdom	World War II: The coaster was bombed and sunk in the Atlantic Ocean (61°20′N 11°00′W) by Focke-Wulf Fw 200 aircraft of I Staffeln, Kampfgeschwader 40, Luftwaffe. Her crew were rescued.
Commander Horton	United Kingdom	World War II: The fishing trawler was torpedoed and sunk in the Atlantic Ocean (approximately 62°N 16°W) by U-552 (Kriegsmarine) with the loss of all fourteen crew.
Costa Rica	United Kingdom	World War II: Battle of Greece: The troopship was bombed by Luftwaffe aircraft and sunk north of Crete, Greece (35°54′N 23°49′E). All aboard were rescued by HMS Defender, HMS Hereward, HMS Hero and HMS Phoebe (all Royal Navy).
Danapris	Greece	World War II: Battle of Greece The cargo ship was bombed and sunk at Piraeus by Luftwaffe aircraft. She was subsequently refloated, but was wrecked at Chalkis.
HMS Diamond	Royal Navy	World War II: Battle of Greece: The D-class destroyer was bombed and sunk in the Sea of Crete by Junkers Ju 87 aircraft of Kampfgeschwader 77, Luftwaffe with the loss of all 149 hands.
Fragiscos	Greece	World War II: The coaster was bombed and sunk off Kythera by Luftwaffe aircraft. There were no casualties.
Henri Mory	United Kingdom	World War II: The cargo ship was torpedoed and sunk in the Atlantic Ocean 300 nautical miles (560 km) west north west of the Blasket Islands, County Kerry, Ireland by U-110 (Kriegsmarine) with the loss of 28 of her 32 crew. Survivors were rescued by HMS Hurricane (Royal Navy).
Hollandia	Greece	World War II: The cargo ship was bombed and sunk at Ermioni by Luftwaffe aircraft.
Patia	Royal Navy	World War II: The fighter catapult ship was bombed and sunk in the North Sea off the Coquet Islands, Northumberland by a Heinkel He 115 aircraft of III Staffeln, 506 Küstenfliegergruppe, Luftwaffe with the loss of 39 of her crew.
Rimac	Norway	World War II: The cargo ship collided with HMT Lord Plender (Royal Navy) and sank in the North Sea off Great Yarmouth, Norfolk, United Kingdom with the loss of three of her crew and three crew from HMT Lord Plender, which rescued the survivors.
Rimfakse	Norway	World War II: The cargo ship was torpedoed and sunk in the Atlantic Ocean (60°10′N 8°54′W) by U-147 (Kriegsmarine) with the loss of eleven of her nineteen crew. Survivors were rescued by Hengist (United Kingdom).
Slamat	Netherlands	World War II: Battle of Greece, Slamat disaster: The troopship was bombed and sunk in the Argolic Gulf of the Peloponnese (37°01′N 23°10′E) by Junkers Ju 87 aircraft of Kampfgeschwader 77, Luftwaffe with the immediate loss of 193 of the 843 people aboard. Many survivors were rescued by HMS Diamond and HMS Wryneck (both Royal Navy) but most were killed when those ships were also sunk. Only five people survived. The combined loss of Slamat, Diamond and Wryneck cost an estimated 983 lives. There were a total of 66 survivors from the three ships.
S.N.A. 7	France	World War II: The cargo ship struck a mine and sank in the Mediterranean Sea off Cape Bon, Tunisia with the loss of sixteen of her crew.
Tassos	Greece	World War II: The coaster was bombed and sunk at Ermioni by Luftwaffe aircraft. There were no casualties.
HMS Wryneck	Royal Navy	World War II: Battle of Greece: The W-class destroyer was bombed and sunk in the Sea of Crete by Junkers Ju 87 aircraft of Kampfgeschwader 77, Luftwaffe with the loss of 107 of her 156 crew. Twenty-seven survivors were rescued by HMS Griffin (Royal Navy), and 22 reached Suda Bay in the ship's whale boat.

== 28 April ==
List of shipwrecks: 28 April 1941
Ship	State	Description
A 3	Royal Hellenic Navy	The A 1-class contraband chaser was lost on this date.
Aikaterini	Greece	World War II: The coaster was bombed and sunk off Spetsopoula by Luftwaffe aircraft.
Aixos	Royal Hellenic Navy	World War II: The Aliakmon-class trawler/auxiliary minelayer was sunk at Syros.
Ambrose Fleming	United Kingdom	World War II: The collier was torpedoed and sunk in the North Sea off Cromer, Norfolk by a Kriegsmarine E-boat. She was on a voyage from London to Burntisland, Fife.
Caledonia	Norway	World War II: Convoy HX 121: The tanker was torpedoed and sunk in the Atlantic Ocean (60°03′N 16°10′W) by U-96 (Kriegsmarine) with the loss of twelve of her 48 crew. Survivors were rescued by Zaafaran (United Kingdom). Caledonia was on a voyage from Aruba to the Clyde.
Capulet	United Kingdom	World War II: Convoy HX 121: The tanker was torpedoed and damaged in the Atlantic Ocean (60°16′N 16°10′W) by U-552 (Kriegsmarine) with the loss of nine of her 44 crew. She was torpedoed and sunk on 2 May by U-201 (Kriegsmarine. Survivors were rescued by HMS Douglas (Royal Navy) and Zaafaran (United Kingdom)
HNLMS Caroline	Royal Netherlands Navy	World War II: The naval trawler struck a mine and sank in the Bristol Channel off Milford Haven, Pembrokeshire, United Kingdom with the loss of all fifteen hands.
Clan Buchanan	United Kingdom	World War II: The cargo ship was shelled and sunk in the Atlantic Ocean (5°24′N 62°46′E) by Pinguin (Kriegsmarine). All 107 crew were rescued by Pinguin, but were lost when Pinguin was sunk.
Empire Strait	United Kingdom	World War II: The collier was bombed and damaged off Great Yarmouth, Norfolk by Luftwaffe aircraft. She was on a voyage from Ipswich, Suffolk to West Hartlepool, County Durham. Empire Strait was subsequently repaired and returned to service.
HMS LCT 5	Royal Navy	World War II: The Mk 1-class Landing Craft, Tank was bombed at Monemvassia, Greece. She was beached and abandoned.
HMS LCT 15	Royal Navy	World War II: The A lighter was bombed and sunk with all hands in the Mediterranean Sea between Suda Bay and Monemvasia, Greece.
Moncousu	United Kingdom	World War II: The depot ship was bombed and sunk at Plymouth, Devon by Luftwaffe aircraft.
Oilfield	United Kingdom	World War II: Convoy HX 121: The tanker was torpedoed and sunk in the Atlantic Ocean (60°05′N 17°00′W) by U-96 (Kriegsmarine) with the loss of 47 of her 55 crew. Survivors were rescued by HMT St. Zeno (Royal Navy)
Port Hardy	United Kingdom	World War II: Convoy HX 121: The cargo ship was torpedoed and sunk in the Atlantic Ocean (60°14′N 15°20′W) by U-96 (Kriegsmarine) with the loss of one of her 98 crew. Survivors were rescued by Zaafaran (United Kingdom).
U-65	Kriegsmarine	World War II: The Type IXB submarine was depth charged and sunk in the Atlantic Ocean (60°04′N 15°45′W) by HMS Douglas (Royal Navy) with the loss of all 46 crew.

== 29 April ==
List of shipwrecks: 29 April 1941
Ship	State	Description
Aetos	Greece	World War II: The coaster was bombed and sunk in Greek waters by Luftwaffe aircraft.
Ambrose Fleming	United Kingdom	World War II: Convoy EC 13: The cargo ship was torpedoed and sunk in the North Sea (53°14′N 1°08′E) by S-29 (Kriegsmarine) with the loss of eleven of her crew.
C 293	Royal Navy	World War II: The C lighter was bombed and sunk at Plymouth, Devon.
HMS Chakla	Royal Navy	World War II: The armed boarding vessel was bombed and sunk at Tobruk, Libya by Junkers Ju 87 aircraft of III Staffeln, Sturzkampfgeschwader 1 and II Staffeln, Sturzkampfgeschwader 2, Luftwaffe and 96 & 236 Squadriglia, Regia Aeronautica.
Chiloe	Chile	The passenger ship ran aground on Puchoco Point and was wrecked.
City of Nagpur	United Kingdom	World War II: The passenger ship was torpedoed and sunk in the Atlantic Ocean (52°30′N 26°00′W) by U-75 (Kriegsmarine) with the loss of sixteen of the 478 people on board. Survivors were rescued by HMS Hurricane (Royal Navy).
Elsi	Greece	World War II: The cargo ship was bombed and sunk in Suda Bay by Luftwaffe aircraft. She was later salvaged and repaired by the Germans.
Kalua	United Kingdom	World War II: The cargo ship was bombed and sunk in the North Sea off the mouth of the River Tyne by Junkers Ju 88 aircraft of I Staffeln, Küstenfliegergruppe 506, Luftwaffe. Her crew were rescued.
Konistra	Greece	World War II: The cargo was bombed and sunk in Suda Bay by Luftwaffe aircraft. She was later salvaged and repaired by the Germans.
HMML 278	Royal Navy	World War II: The Fairmile B motor launch struck a mine and sank at Portsmouth, Hampshire with the loss of all hands.
HMS Pessac	Royal Navy	World War II: The auxiliary patrol vessel was bombed and sunk at Plymouth by Luftwaffe aircraft. She was raised, repaired and returned to service in 1942.

== 30 April ==
List of shipwrecks: 30 April 1941
Ship	State	Description
CF 1	Kriegsmarine	The CF 1-class patrol boat was lost on this date.
HMS Fermoy	Royal Navy	World War II: The Hunt-class minesweeper was bombed and damaged at Malta by Luftwaffe aircraft and was declared a constructive total loss. She was further damaged by bombing on 4 May and sank.
Lassell	United Kingdom	World War II: The cargo ship was torpedoed and sunk in the Atlantic Ocean 250 nautical miles (460 km) south west of the Cape Verde Islands, Portugal (12°55′N 28°56′W) by U-107 (Kriegsmarine) with the loss of two of her 53 crew. Survivors were rescued by Benvrackie and Egba (both United Kingdom).
Nerissa	United Kingdom	World War II: The cargo ship was torpedoed and sunk in the Atlantic Ocean (55°57′N 10°08′W) by U-552 (Kriegsmarine) with the loss of 207 of the 287 people on board. Nerissa was on a voyage from Saint John's, Dominion of Newfoundland to Liverpool, Lancashire.
HMIS Parvati	Royal Indian Navy	World War II: The patrol vessel struck a mine and sank in the Red Sea off Assab, Italian Eritrea (13°11′N 42°54′E) with the loss of sixteen of her 37 crew. Survivors were rescued by a Royal Navy ship. The approaches of Assab had been mined by Pantera (Regia Marina) in June 1940.
HMS Peuplier	Royal Navy	World War II: The tug was bombed and sunk off Plymouth.
HMT Trusty Star	Royal Navy	World War II: The naval trawler was bombed and sunk at Malta by Luftwaffe aircraft. She was later salvaged, repaired and returned to service.

== Unknown date ==
List of shipwrecks: Unknown date 1941
Ship	State	Description
A 32	Royal Hellenic Navy	The A 32-class contraband chaser was lost sometime in April.
Ardena	Greece	World War II: The cargo ship was bombed and sunk by Luftwaffe aircraft. She was later salvaged and repaired by the Germans.
D'Artagnan	France	The passenger ship was damaged by fire at Shanghai, China. She was declared a total loss. She was salvaged by the Japanese in 1942, repaired and entered Japanese service as Teiko Maru.
HMS LSI 4250	Royal Navy	World War II: The Landing Ship, Infantry (Large) was severely damaged in the evacuation of military personnel from Greece. Subsequently repaired and returned to service.
HMS Usk	Royal Navy	World War II: The U-class submarine was lost due to enemy action sometime on or after 25 April with the loss of all 31 crew.

== Notes ==
1. The 14th Destroyer Flotilla comprised HMS Janus, HMS Jervis, HMS Mohawk and HMS Nubian.
