= German submarine U-98 (1940) =

German World War II submarine

History

Nazi Germany
- Name: U-98
- Ordered: 30 May 1938
- Builder: Germaniawerft, Kiel
- Yard number: 603
- Laid down: 27 September 1939
- Launched: 31 August 1940
- Commissioned: 12 October 1940
- Fate: Sunk, 15 November 1942

General characteristics
- Class & type: Type VIIC submarine
- Displacement: 769 tonnes (757 long tons) surfaced; 871 t (857 long tons) submerged
- Length: 67.10 m (220 ft 2 in) o/a; 50.50 m (165 ft 8 in) pressure hull
- Beam: 6.20 m (20 ft 4 in) o/a; 4.70 m (15 ft 5 in) pressure hull
- Height: 9.60 m (31 ft 6 in)
- Draught: 4.74 m (15 ft 7 in)
- Installed power: 2,800–3,200 PS (2,100–2,400 kW; 2,800–3,200 bhp) (diesels); 750 PS (550 kW; 740 shp) (electric)
- Propulsion: 2 shafts; 2 × diesel engines; 2 × electric motors
- Speed: 17.7 knots (32.8 km/h; 20.4 mph) surfaced; 7.6 knots (14.1 km/h; 8.7 mph) submerged
- Range: 8,500 nmi (15,700 km; 9,800 mi) at 10 knots (19 km/h; 12 mph) surfaced; 80 nmi (150 km; 92 mi) at 4 knots (7.4 km/h; 4.6 mph) submerged
- Test depth: 230 m (750 ft); Crush depth: 250–295 m (820–968 ft)
- Complement: 4 officers, 40–56 enlisted
- Armament: 5 × 53.3 cm (21 in) torpedo tubes (four bow, one stern); 14 × torpedoes or 26 TMA mines; 1 × 8.8 cm (3.46 in) deck gun (220 rounds); 1 x 2 cm (0.79 in) C/30 AA gun

Service record
- Part of: 7th U-boat Flotilla; 12 October 1940 – 15 November 1942
- Identification codes: M 30 006
- Commanders: Kptlt. Robert Gysae; 12 October 1940 – 23 March 1942; Kptlt. Wilhelm Schulze; 24 March – October 1942; Oblt.z.S. Kurt Eichmann; October – 15 November 1942
- Operations: 9 patrols: 1st patrol: 12 March – 14 April 1941; 2nd patrol: 1 – 29 May 1941; 3rd patrol: 23 June – 23 July 1941; 4th patrol: 31 August – 26 September 1941; 5th patrol: 29 October – 29 November 1941; 6th patrol: 18 January – 27 February 1942; 7th patrol: 31 March – 6 June 1942; 8th patrol: 14 July – 16 September 1942; 9th patrol: 22 October – 15 November 1942
- Victories: 10 merchant ships sunk (48,878 GRT); 1 auxiliary warship sunk (10,549 GRT); 1 warship damaged (185 tons)

German submarine U-98 was a Type VIIC U-boat of Nazi Germany's Kriegsmarine during World War II, operating from March 1941 until she was sunk in November 1942.

She was launched on 31 August 1940 and commissioned on 12 October, with a crew of 46 under the command of Kapitänleutnant Robert Gysae, operating from St. Nazaire in France. On 24 March 1942 command was transferred to Korvettenkapitän Wilhelm Schulze. Her final commander was Oberleutnant zur See Kurt Eichmann, who took over in October 1942. She was a member of six wolfpacks.

== Design ==
German Type VIIC submarines were preceded by the shorter Type VIIB submarines. U-98 had a displacement of 769 tonnes (757 long tons) when at the surface and 871 tonnes (857 long tons) while submerged. She had a total length of 67.10 m (220 ft 2 in), a pressure hull length of 50.50 m (165 ft 8 in), a beam of 6.20 m (20 ft 4 in), a height of 9.60 m (31 ft 6 in), and a draught of 4.74 m (15 ft 7 in). The submarine was powered by two Germaniawerft F46 four-stroke, six-cylinder supercharged diesel engines producing a total of 2,800 to 3,200 metric horsepower (2,060 to 2,350 kW; 2,760 to 3,160 shp) for use while surfaced, two AEG GU 460/8–27 double-acting electric motors producing a total of 750 metric horsepower (550 kW; 740 shp) for use while submerged. She had two shafts and two 1.23 m (4 ft) propellers. The boat was capable of operating at depths of up to 230 metres (750 ft).

The submarine had a maximum surface speed of 17.7 knots (32.8 km/h; 20.4 mph) and a maximum submerged speed of 7.6 knots (14.1 km/h; 8.7 mph). When submerged, the boat could operate for 80 nautical miles (150 km; 92 mi) at 4 knots (7.4 km/h; 4.6 mph); when surfaced, she could travel 8,500 nautical miles (15,700 km; 9,800 mi) at 10 knots (19 km/h; 12 mph). U-98 was fitted with five 53.3 cm (21 in) torpedo tubes (four fitted at the bow and one at the stern), fourteen torpedoes, one 8.8 cm (3.46 in) SK C/35 naval gun, 220 rounds, and a 2 cm (0.79 in) C/30 anti-aircraft gun. The boat had a complement of between forty-four and sixty.

== Service history ==
=== First patrol ===
U-98 sailed from Kiel under the command of Robert Gysae on 12 March 1941, and out into the Atlantic south of Iceland. On 27 March she sank the British 6,695 GRT Koranton, a straggler from Convoy SC 25, with a single torpedo south southwest of Reykjavík. The ship sank quickly; she was loaded with 8,769 tons of pig iron. On 4 April U-98 joined a wolfpack in an attack on Convoy SC 26. She sank the Norwegian 2,467 GRT Helle, and the British 5,122 GRT Wellcombe. On 9 April she sank the Dutch 1,304 GRT Prins Willem II, from Convoy HX 117. The U-boat then arrived at Lorient on the French Atlantic coast on 14 April.

=== Second patrol ===
Sailing from Lorient on 1 May 1941, U-98 headed once more out into the Atlantic, this time to the waters south of Cape Farewell, Greenland. There at 04:00 hours on 13 May, she spotted the British 10,549 GRT armed merchant cruiser (AMC) HMS Salopian, escorting Convoy SC 30 in fog. U-98's first attack, with two torpedoes missed, as did her second at 06:20. A third attack an hour later was more successful, hitting the AMC amidships and in the bow, although not preventing the ship from opening fire on the submarine, which forced the boat to dive. However, these hits brought down Salopian's radio antenna and fractured a steam line, shutting down her engines.

At 08:00 and 08:50, two more torpedoes hit Salopian in the engine room. Finally at 10:43, a single torpedo hit the stricken vessel amidships. She broke in two, and sank within two minutes. In all, nine torpedoes had been used. Former merchant vessels such as Salopian, when converted for naval use, had their cargo holds filled with buoyant material such as empty barrels, so they could withstand a considerable number of torpedo hits and remain afloat.

The next day Salopian's commander, Captain Sir John Meynell Alleyne and 277 officers and ratings were picked up by the destroyer HMS Impulsive. One officer and two ratings were lost.

On 20 May 1941 U-98 sank the British 5,356 GRT Rothermere, part of convoy HX 126, which had scattered. The next day she sank the British 7,402 GRT Marconi, part of another dispersed convoy, OB 322. U-98 arrived at her new homeport at St. Nazaire on 29 May 1941.

=== Third patrol ===
Sailing from St. Nazaire on 23 June 1941, U-98 attacked Convoy OB 341 northwest of the Azores on 9 July and sank the British 5,945 GRT Designer, she also destroyed the British 4,897 GRT Inverness. She returned to St. Nazaire on 23 July.

=== Fourth patrol ===
Departing from St. Nazaire on 31 August 1941, U-98 patrolled the waters west of the British Isles, and on 16 September fired four single torpedoes at Convoy SC 42 north-west of St. Kilda, sinking the British 4,392 GRT Jedmoor. She returned to St. Nazaire on 26 September.

=== Fifth patrol ===
U-98 left St. Nazaire on 29 October 1941, and returned on 29 November, after a patrol in the Atlantic, north of the Azores, lasting 32 days, but with no results.

=== Sixth patrol ===
U-98 sailed on 18 January 1942, for her last patrol under the command of Robert Gysae, and headed across the Atlantic to the east coast of Canada. There, on 15 February 1942, she torpedoed the British 5,298 GRT Biela, originally from Convoy ON 62, sinking her about 400 miles southeast of Cape Race (on the eastern tip of Newfoundland). There were no survivors, even though the ship's crew had taken to the boats. The U-boat returned to St. Nazaire on 27 February.

=== Seventh patrol ===
On 31 March 1942, now commanded by Korvettenkapitän Wilhelm Schulze, U-98 sailed from St. Nazaire. However, at 00:47 on 2 April, still in the Bay of Biscay the U-boat was attacked by a Whitley bomber of 502 Squadron RAF Coastal Command with six 250-pound (110 kg) depth charges. U-98 crash-dived and escaped with minor damage. She then sailed for the coast of Florida, but had no success, returning to port on 6 June 1942.

=== Eighth patrol ===
U-98 next patrol began on 14 July 1942, it took her back to the Florida coast to lay mines, one of which damaged the American 185 tons minesweeper Bold (AMc-67) on 10 August 1942. She returned home on 16 September.

=== Ninth and final patrol ===
U-98's ninth and final patrol was under the command of Oblt.z.S. Kurt Eichmann. The U-boat departed St. Nazaire on 22 October 1942, and after a voyage out to the mid-Atlantic without result was sunk on 15 November west of the Strait of Gibraltar at 36°09′N 7°42′W, by depth charges from the British destroyer HMS Wrestler, all 46 hands were lost.

=== Wolfpacks ===
U-98 took part in six wolfpacks, namely:

- West (8 – 27 May 1941)
- Seewolf (3 – 15 September 1941)
- Störtebecker (5 – 19 November 1941)
- Gödecke (19 – 22 November 1941)
- Natter (30 October – 8 November 1942)
- Westwall (8 – 15 November 1942)

== Summary of raiding history ==
Date	Ship	Nationality	Tonnage (Note: Merchant ship tonnages are in gross register tons. Military vessels are listed by tons displacement.)	Fate
27 March 1941	Koranton	United Kingdom	6,695	Sunk
4 April 1941	Helle	Norway	2,467	Sunk
4 April 1941	Welcombe	United Kingdom	5,122	Sunk
9 April 1941	Prins Wellen II	Netherlands	1,304	Sunk
13 May 1941	HMS Salopian	Royal Navy	10,549	Sunk
20 May 1941	Rothermere	United Kingdom	5,356	Sunk
21 May 1941	Marconi	United Kingdom	7,402	Sunk
9 July 1941	Designer	United Kingdom	5,945	Sunk
9 July 1941	Inverness	United Kingdom	4,897	Sunk
16 September 1941	Jedmoor	United Kingdom	4,392	Sunk
15 February 1942	Biela	United Kingdom	5,298	Sunk
10 August 1942	USS Bold	United States Navy	185	Damaged (mine)

== Previously recorded fate ==
U-98 was originally thought to have been sunk on 19 November 1942 southwest of Cape St. Vincent, by a Lockheed Hudson of 608 Squadron. U-413 was the target—she was severely damaged.

== Bibliography ==
- Busch, Rainer; Röll, Hans-Joachim (1999). German U-boat commanders of World War II : a biographical dictionary. Translated by Brooks, Geoffrey. London, Annapolis, Md: Greenhill Books, Naval Institute Press. ISBN 1-55750-186-6.
- Busch, Rainer; Röll, Hans-Joachim (1999). Deutsche U-Boot-Verluste von September 1939 bis Mai 1945 [German U-boat losses from September 1939 to May 1945]. Der U-Boot-Krieg (in German). Vol. IV. Hamburg, Berlin, Bonn: Mittler. ISBN 3-8132-0514-2.
- Gröner, Erich; Jung, Dieter; Maass, Martin (1991). U-boats and Mine Warfare Vessels. German Warships 1815–1945. Vol. 2. Translated by Thomas, Keith; Magowan, Rachel. London: Conway Maritime Press. ISBN 0-85177-593-4.
- Daniel Morgan; Bruce Taylor (9 November 2011). U-Boat Attack Logs: A Complete Record of Warship Sinkings from Original Sources 1939-1945. Seaforth Publishing. pp. 96–100. ISBN 978-1-84832-118-2.
