= German submarine U-2 (1935) =

German World War II submarine

Coordinates: 54.800°N 19.917°E

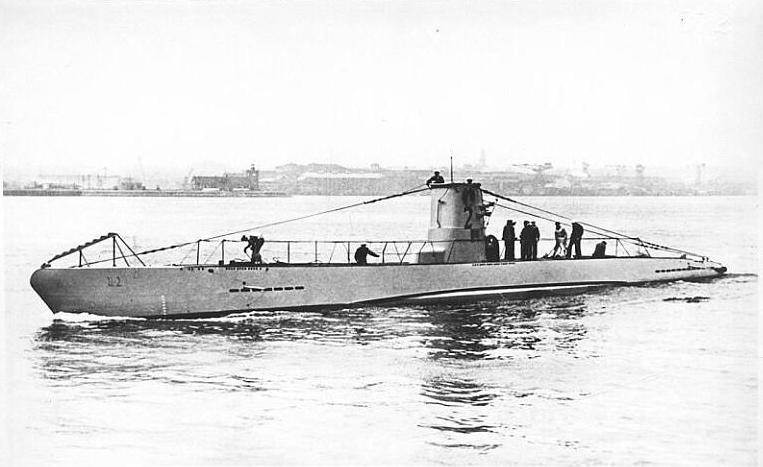
- U-2 in Kiel, in 1935

History

Nazi Germany
- Name: U-2
- Ordered: 2 February 1935
- Builder: Deutsche Werke, Kiel
- Cost: 1,500,000 ℛ︁ℳ︁
- Yard number: 237
- Laid down: 11 February 1935
- Launched: 1 July 1935
- Commissioned: 25 July 1935
- Stricken: 9 April 1944
- Fate: Sunk after a collision west of Pillau, 8 April 1944

General characteristics
- Class & type: Type IIA coastal submarine
- Displacement: 254 t (250 long tons) surfaced; 303 t (298 long tons) submerged; 381 t (375 long tons) total
- Length: 40.90 m (134 ft 2 in) (o/a); 27.80 m (91 ft 2 in) (pressure hull)
- Beam: 4.08 m (13 ft 5 in) (o/a); 4.00 m (13 ft 1 in) (pressure hull)
- Height: 8.60 m (28 ft 3 in)
- Draught: 3.83 m (12 ft 7 in)
- Installed power: 700 PS (510 kW; 690 shp) (diesels); 360 PS (260 kW; 360 shp) (electric)
- Propulsion: 2 × propeller shafts; 2 × 0.85 m (2 ft 9 in) three-bladed propellers; 2 × diesel engines; 2 × double-acting electric motors
- Speed: 13 knots (24 km/h; 15 mph) surfaced; 6.9 knots (12.8 km/h; 7.9 mph) submerged
- Range: 1,050 nmi (1,940 km; 1,210 mi) at 12 knots (22 km/h; 14 mph) surfaced; 35 nmi (65 km; 40 mi) at 4 knots (7.4 km/h; 4.6 mph) submerged
- Test depth: 80 m (260 ft)
- Complement: 3 officers, 22 men
- Armament: 3 × 53.3 cm (21 in) torpedo tubes; 5 × torpedoes or up to 12 TMA or 18 TMB mines; 1 × 2 cm (0.79 in) C/30 anti-aircraft gun

Service record
- Part of: U-boat School Flotilla; 1 July 1935 – 1 August 1939; 1 September 1939 – 1 February 1940; 1 March 1940 – 1 April 1940; 1 May 1940 – 30 June 1940; 21st U-boat Flotilla; 1 July 1940 – 8 April 1944
- Identification codes: M 27 610
- Commanders: Oblt.z.S. Hermann Michahelles; 25 July 1935 – 30 September 1936; Kptlt. Heinrich Liebe; 1 October 1936 – 31 January 1938; Oblt.z.S. Herbert Schultze; 31 January – 16 March 1938; Oblt.z.S. / Kptlt. Helmut Rosenbaum; 17 March 1939 – 5 August 1940; Oblt.z.S. Hans Heidtmann; 7 July – 5 August 1940 (deputy); Kptlt. Georg von Wilamowitz-Moellendorff; 6 August – October 1941; Karl Kölzer; October 1941 – 15 May 1942; Oblt.z.S. Werner Schwaff; 16 May – 19 November 1942; Oblt.z.S. Helmut Herglotz; 20 November – 12 December 1943; Oblt.z.S. Wolfgang Schwarzkopf; 13 December 1943 – 8 April 1944
- Operations: 2 patrols: 1st patrol: 15 – 29 March 1940; 2nd patrol: 4 – 15 April 1940
- Victories: No ships sunk or damaged

German submarine U-2 was a Type IIA U-boat of Nazi Germany's Kriegsmarine. Her keel was laid down 11 February 1935 by Deutsche Werke of Kiel as yard number 237; she was launched on 1 July and commissioned on 25 July 1935 with Oberleutnant zur See (Oblt.z.S.) Hermann Michahelles in command.

== Design ==
German Type II submarines were based on the Finnish submarine Vesikko. U-2 had a displacement of 254 tonnes (250 long tons) when at the surface and 303 tonnes (298 long tons) while submerged. Officially, the standard tonnage was 250 long tons (254 t), however. The U-boat had a total length of 40.90 m (134 ft 2 in), a pressure hull length of 27.80 m (91 ft 2 in), a beam of 4.08 m (13 ft 5 in), a height of 8.60 m (28 ft 3 in), and a draught of 3.83 m (12 ft 7 in). The submarine was powered by two MWM RS 127 S four-stroke, six-cylinder diesel engines of 700 metric horsepower (510 kW; 690 shp) for cruising, and two Siemens-Schuckert PG VV 322/36 double-acting electric motors producing a total of 360 metric horsepower (260 kW; 360 shp) for use while submerged. She had two shafts and two 0.85 m (3 ft) propellers. The U-boat was capable of operating at depths of up to 80–150 metres (260–490 ft).

The submarine had a maximum surface speed of 13 knots (24 km/h; 15 mph) and a maximum submerged speed of 6.9 knots (12.8 km/h; 7.9 mph). When submerged, the boat could operate for 35 nautical miles (65 km; 40 mi) at 4 knots (7.4 km/h; 4.6 mph); when surfaced, she could travel 1,600 nautical miles (3,000 km; 1,800 mi) at 8 knots (15 km/h; 9.2 mph). U-2 was fitted with three 53.3 cm (21 in) torpedo tubes at the bow, five torpedoes or up to twelve Type A torpedo mines, and a 2 cm (0.79 in) anti-aircraft gun. The boat had a complement of 25.

== Service history ==
She had several commanders over her long career. Michahelles was relieved on 30 September 1936, by Kapitänleutnant (Kptlt.) Heinrich Liebe. Liebe turned command over on 31 January 1938 to Oblt.z.S. Herbert Schultze. On 16 March 1939, Kptlt. Helmut Rosenbaum assumed command and on 7 July 1940, Oblt.z.S. Hans Heidtmann joined Rosenbaum as deputy commander. On 6 August 1940, Georg von Wilamowitz-Moellendorf relieved Rosenbaum and Heidtmann and commanded until October 1941 when Karl Kölzer took over. On 16 May 1942, Oblt.z.S. Werner Schwaff relieved Kölzer, and on 20 November 1942, was relieved by Oblt.z.S. Helmut Herglotz. On 12 December 1943, Oblt.z.S. Wolfgang Schwarzkopf took over and commanded the boat until she was lost.

She was used as a school boat and trainer for her entire career except for two completely uneventful combat patrols in early 1940.

== Fate ==
U-2 suffered no casualties to any of her numerous crews until 8 April 1944 when she collided with the German steam trawler Helmi Söhle (Note: Gröner names the vessel involved in the collision as Hinrich Freese, which according to other sources had already sunk on 16 November 1940 .) west of Pillau (today's Baltiysk, Russia) and sank. 17 of her crew were killed; 18 survived. The wreck was raised the next day and stricken.

== Bibliography ==
- Busch, Rainer; Röll, Hans-Joachim (1999a). German U-boat commanders of World War II : a biographical dictionary. Translated by Brooks, Geoffrey. London, Annapolis, Md: Greenhill Books, Naval Institute Press. ISBN 1-55750-186-6.
- Busch, Rainer; Röll, Hans-Joachim (1999b). Deutsche U-Boot-Verluste von September 1939 bis Mai 1945 [German U-boat losses from September 1939 to May 1945]. Der U-Boot-Krieg (in German). Vol. IV. Hamburg, Berlin, Bonn: Mittler. ISBN 3-8132-0514-2.
- Gröner, Erich; Jung, Dieter; Maass, Martin (1991). U-boats and Mine Warfare Vessels. German Warships 1815–1945. Vol. 2. Translated by Thomas, Keith; Magowan, Rachel. London: Conway Maritime Press. ISBN 0-85177-593-4.
- Sharpe, Peter (1998). U-Boat Fact File. Great Britain: Midland Publishing. ISBN 1-85780-072-9.
- Rössler, Eberhard (1979). Die deutschen U-Boote und ihre Werften: eine Bilddokumentation über den deutschen U-Bootbau; in zwei Bänden (in German). Vol. I. Munich: Bernard & Graefe. ISBN 3-7637-5213-7.
