= German submarine U-76 (1940) =

German World War II submarine

Coordinates: 58°35′N 20°20′W

History

Nazi Germany
- Name: U-76
- Ordered: 2 June 1938
- Builder: Vegesacker Werft, Bremen-Vegesack
- Yard number: 4
- Laid down: 28 December 1939
- Launched: 3 October 1940
- Commissioned: 9 December 1940
- Fate: Sunk, 5 April 1941

General characteristics
- Class & type: Type VIIB U-boat
- Displacement: 753 t (741 long tons) surfaced; 857 t (843 long tons) submerged
- Length: 66.50 m (218 ft 2 in) o/a; 48.80 m (160 ft 1 in) pressure hull
- Beam: 6.20 m (20 ft 4 in) o/a; 4.70 m (15 ft 5 in) pressure hull
- Draught: 4.74 m (15 ft 7 in)
- Installed power: 2,800–3,200 PS (2,100–2,400 kW; 2,800–3,200 bhp) (diesels); 750 PS (550 kW; 740 shp) (electric)
- Propulsion: 2 shafts; 2 × diesel engines; 2 × electric motors
- Speed: 17.9 knots (33.2 km/h; 20.6 mph) surfaced; 8 knots (15 km/h; 9.2 mph)
- Range: 8,700 nmi (16,100 km; 10,000 mi) at 10 knots (19 km/h; 12 mph) surfaced; 90 nmi (170 km; 100 mi) at 4 knots (7.4 km/h; 4.6 mph) submerged
- Test depth: 230 m (750 ft); Calculated crush depth: 250–295 m (820–968 ft)
- Boats & landing craft carried: 1 inflatable rubber boat
- Complement: 4 officers, 40–56 enlisted
- Sensors & processing systems: FuMO 61 Hohentwiel U; Gruppenhorchgerät
- Armament: 5 × 53.3 cm (21 in) torpedo tubes (four bow, one stern); 14 × torpedoes or 26 TMA mines; 1 × 8.8 cm (3.46 in) deck gun (220 rounds); 1 × 2 cm (0.79 in) C/30 anti-aircraft gun

Service record
- Part of: 7th U-boat Flotilla; 3 December 1940 – 5 April 1941
- Identification codes: M 27 140
- Commanders: Oblt.z.S. Friedrich von Hippel; 3 December 1940 – 5 April 1941
- Operations: 1 patrol: 28 March – 5 April 1941
- Victories: 2 merchant ships sunk (7,290 GRT)

German submarine U-76 was a Type VIIB U-boat of Nazi Germany's Kriegsmarine during World War II. She played a minor role in the Battle of the Atlantic, but was destroyed south of Iceland.

== Design ==
German Type VIIB submarines were preceded by the shorter Type VIIA submarines. U-76 had a displacement of 753 tonnes (741 long tons) when at the surface and 857 tonnes (843 long tons) while submerged. She had a total length of 66.50 m (218 ft 2 in), a pressure hull length of 48.80 m (160 ft 1 in), a beam of 6.20 m (20 ft 4 in), a height of 9.50 m (31 ft 2 in), and a draught of 4.74 m (15 ft 7 in). The submarine was powered by two MAN M 6 V 40/46 four-stroke, six-cylinder supercharged diesel engines producing a total of 2,800 to 3,200 metric horsepower (2,060 to 2,350 kW; 2,760 to 3,160 shp) for use while surfaced, two BBC GG UB 720/8 double-acting electric motors producing a total of 750 metric horsepower (550 kW; 740 shp) for use while submerged. She had two shafts and two 1.23 m (4 ft) propellers. The boat was capable of operating at depths of up to 230 metres (750 ft).

The submarine had a maximum surface speed of 17.9 knots (33.2 km/h; 20.6 mph) and a maximum submerged speed of 8 knots (15 km/h; 9.2 mph). When submerged, the boat could operate for 90 nautical miles (170 km; 100 mi) at 4 knots (7.4 km/h; 4.6 mph); when surfaced, she could travel 8,700 nautical miles (16,100 km; 10,000 mi) at 10 knots (19 km/h; 12 mph). U-76 was fitted with five 53.3 cm (21 in) torpedo tubes (four fitted at the bow and one at the stern), fourteen torpedoes, one 8.8 cm (3.46 in) SK C/35 naval gun, 220 rounds, and one 2 cm (0.79 in) anti-aircraft gun The boat had a complement of between forty-four and sixty.

== Service history ==
She was laid down at Bremer Vulkan in Bremen on 28 December 1939 as yard number 4. She was launched on 3 October 1940 and commissioned on 9 December.

U-76 was available for service from March 1941 following the completion of her working-up period and sea trials. Her commander, Oberleutnant zur See (Oblt.z.S.) Friedrich von Hippel, had previously served in U-144 during her trials until November the previous year.

=== War patrol ===
Six days into her first and only patrol on 2 April, U-76 sank the Finnish steam merchant ship SS Daphne which was on her way to Lillehammer, Norway. All twenty-two crew members were killed in the attack.

The next day, U-76 followed the mostly British convoy SC 26 travelling from Sydney, Nova Scotia to Liverpool. The U-boat fired a torpedo at the British merchantman SS Athenic, disabling the vessel. The 40 people aboard were rescued by HMS Arbutus.

The attack attracted the attention of the armed escort vessels, who pinpointed her position. Deploying depth charges from HMS Wolverine and Scarborough, U-76 was sunk. Forty-two of her forty-three-man crew survived and were captured.

== Summary of raiding history ==
Date	Ship	Nationality	Tonnage (Note: Tonnages are in gross register tons.)	Fate
3 April 1941	Daphne	Finland	1,939	Sunk
4 April 1941	Athenic	United Kingdom	5,351	Sunk

== Bibliography ==
- Busch, Rainer; Röll, Hans-Joachim (1999). German U-boat commanders of World War II : a biographical dictionary. Translated by Brooks, Geoffrey. London, Annapolis, Md: Greenhill Books, Naval Institute Press. ISBN 1-55750-186-6.
- Busch, Rainer; Röll, Hans-Joachim (1999). Der U-Boot-Krieg, 1939-1945: Deutsche U-Boot-Verluste von September 1939 bis Mai 1945 [German U-boat losses from September 1939 to May 1945] (in German). Vol. IV. Hamburg, Berlin, Bonn: Mittler. ISBN 3-8132-0514-2.
- Gröner, Eric; Jung, Dieter; Maass, Martin (1991). German Warships 1815-1945: U-boats and Mine Warfare Vessels. Vol. 2. Translated by Thomas, Keith; Magowan, Rachel. London: Conway Maritime Press. ISBN 0-85177-593-4.
- Gröner, Erich (1990). German Warships, 1815–1945. Conway Maritime Press.
- Kemp, Paul (1997). U-Boats Destroyed, German Submarine Losses in the World Wars. Arms and Armour. pp. 69–70. ISBN 1-85409-515-3.
