= USS Westpool =

Cargo ship of the United States Navy

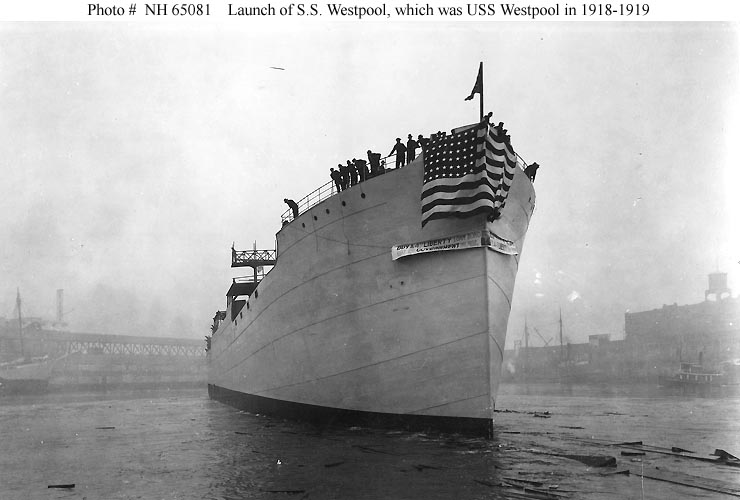
- SS Westpool just after launching at the J. F. Duthie and Company shipyard in Seattle, Washington, in 1918.

History

United States
- Name: USS Westpool
- Builder: J. F. Duthie and Company, Seattle, Washington
- Launched: 21 September 1918
- Completed: 1918
- Acquired: 2 November 1918
- Commissioned: 2 November 1918
- Decommissioned: 31 March 1919
- Stricken: 31 March 1919
- Fate: Returned to U.S. Shipping Board 31 March 1919
- Notes: Sold to United Kingdom early in World War II; Sunk 3 April 1941

General characteristics
- Type: Cargo ship
- Tonnage: 5,650 Gross register tons
- Displacement: 12,170 tons
- Length: 410 ft 5.25 in (125.1014 m)
- Beam: 54 ft 0 in (16.46 m)
- Draft: 24 ft 1 in (7.34 m) (mean)
- Depth: 29 ft 9 in (9.07 m)
- Propulsion: One 3,000-ihp (2.237-mW) steam engine, one shaft
- Speed: 11.5 knots (21.3 km/h; 13.2 mph)
- Complement: 103
- Armament: none

USS Westpool (ID-3675) – sometimes written as West Pool – was a cargo ship of the United States Navy that served during World War I and its immediate aftermath. As SS Westpool, she was sunk in less than a minute during World War II following an attack by U-73 after being sold to the United Kingdom for use as a merchant ship. 8 out of her 35 crew survived the sinking.

== Construction and acquisition ==
Westpool was laid down as the steel-hulled, single-screw Design 1013 commercial cargo ship SS Westpool by J. F. Duthie and Company in Seattle, Washington, for the United States Shipping Board. Completed in 1918, she was inspected by the U.S. Navy for possible World War I service and given the naval registry identification number 3675. The Shipping Board transferred her to the Navy on 2 November 1918, and the Navy commissioned her at Seattle the same day as USS Westpool (ID-3675).

== Navy career ==
Departing Seattle on 8 November 1918 – three days before the armistice with Germany that brought World War I to an end – Westpool steamed to the Panama Canal Zone, where she loaded a cargo for the Panama Railroad Company. She departed the Canal Zone on 9 December 1918 and proceeded to New York City, where she arrived on 20 December 1918 and discharged her cargo. She then loaded 5,002 tons of United States Army cargo and departed New York on 1 February 1919, bound for Antwerp, Belgium.

Arriving at Antwerp on 18 February 1919, Westpool unloaded part of her cargo before moving to Swansea, Wales, late in February 1919. She discharged the rest of her cargo there between 1 and 5 March 1919, then got underway on 5 March 1919 for New York City, where she made port on 23 March 1919.

== Decommissioning and disposal ==
Westpool was decommissioned at New York on 31 March 1919. She was simultaneously struck from the Navy list and transferred back to the U.S. Shipping Board that day.

== Later career ==
Once again SS Westpool, the ship remained under Shipping Board control and was in and out of service at various times until the late 1930s.

Early in World War II, the British government purchased Westpool to help to alleviate the shipping shortage the United Kingdom faced due to losses to German submarines. After a brief career in British service, Westpool was on a voyage from Halifax, Nova Scotia, Canada, to Liverpool, England, carrying 7,144 tons of scrap iron as a part of Convoy SC 26 when she was sunk on 3 April 1941 by the German submarine U-73 with the loss of 35 members of her crew.
