= Helmut Rosenbaum =

German naval officer

- Born: 11 May 1913; Döbeln, German Empire
- Died: 10 May 1944 (aged 30) near Constanţa, Romania
- Military career
- Allegiance: Weimar Republic (to 1933); Nazi Germany
- Branch: Reichsmarine; Kriegsmarine
- Service years: 1932–44
- Rank: Korvettenkapitän (posthumous)
- Units: Köln; Königsberg; Nürnberg; U-35, U-27, U-26
- Commands: U-2, U-73; 30th U-boat Flotilla
- Conflicts: World War II: Battle of the Atlantic; Black Sea campaign
- Awards: Knight's Cross of the Iron Cross

Helmut Rosenbaum (11 May 1913 – 10 May 1944) was a Korvettenkapitän (LT Commander) in Nazi Germany's Kriegsmarine during World War II who commanded U-boat U-2, U-73 and the 30th U-boat Flotilla. He received the Knight's Cross of the Iron Cross, the highest awards in the military and paramilitary forces of Nazi Germany during World War II. He is credited with the sinking of six ships for a total of 35,171 gross register tons (GRT) and three warships.

Born in Döbeln, Rosenbaum joined the Reichsmarine (navy of the Weimar Republic) in 1932. After a period of training on surface vessels and service on various U-boats during the Spanish Civil War, he took command of his first U-boat in 1939. After torpedoing and sinking HMS Eagle on 11 August 1942, Rosenbaum was appointed commander of the 30th U-boat Flotilla. He was killed in an aircraft crash on 10 May 1944.

== Military career ==
Helmut Rosenbaum began his naval career with the Reichsmarine on 15 August 1932 as a late for the year member of "Crew 32" (the incoming class of 1932). He underwent basic military training in the 2nd department of the standing ship division of the Baltic Sea in Stralsund (15 August 1932 – 7 October 1932). (Note: 2nd department —II. Abteilung) (Note: standing ship division —Schiffsstammdivision) Rosenbaum was then transferred to the training ship Edith (14 October 1932 – 21 October 1932), attaining the rank of Seekadett (midshipman) on 4 November 1932. Following a 14-month stay on board the light cruiser Köln (6 November 1932 – 2 January 1934) he advanced in rank to Fähnrich zur See (officer cadet) on 1 January 1934. Rosenbaum then underwent a number of officer training courses at the Naval Academy at Mürwik and Kiel-Wik, including navigational training cruises on the tender Weser and Nordsee, before transferring to the cruiser Königsberg (19 April 1935 – 26 September 1935). Following his stay on Königsberg he was promoted to Oberfähnrich zur See (Senior Ensign) on 1 September 1935. Rosenbaum then attended more training courses, including a naval artillery course (27 September 1935 – 3 December 1935) and an anti U-boat defense course (4 December 1935 – 14 December 1935), before being posted to the cruiser Nürnberg (15 December 1935 – 11 October 1936). During this assignment Rosenbaum received his officer's commission, holding the rank Leutnant zur See (Second Lieutenant) as of 1 January 1936. His stay on Nürnberg was interrupted in February and March to attend another training course at Kiel-Wik.

Rosenbaum then attended various torpedo courses at the torpedo school in Flensburg from mid-October 1936 to the end of January 1937. His U-boat training began on 1 February 1937 ending with his assignment as watch officer on U-35 in the Saltzwedel Flotilla on 3 April 1937. U-35 at the time was no longer under the command of Hans Rudolf Rösing but rather Hermann Michahelles.

From 6 August 1940 to 29 September 1940 he attended U-73 construction briefing at the Bremer Vulkan ship yard and commissioned U-73 on 30 September 1940 after completing his first two war patrols on U-2. (Note: construction briefing —Baubelehrung) He sank one ship on his first patrol on U-73 in the North Atlantic.

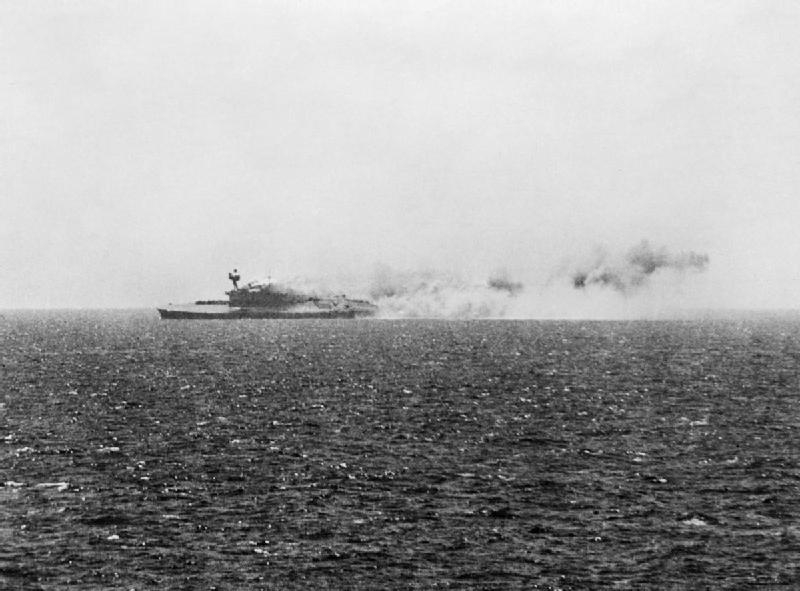
Eagle listing to port and sinking, 11 August 1942

On his second patrol (25 March 1941 – 24 April 1941) on U-73 Rosenbaum departed from Lorient and attacked and sank five ships, returning to St. Nazaire after four weeks at sea. He attacked convoy SC 26 on 3 April 1941 sinking the Alderpool, Indier, Westpool, and British Viscount. The British 8,570 GRT Empire Endurance was sunk on 20 April 1941.

In February 1942 U-73 was heavily bombed during his first Mediterranean patrol but nevertheless managed to reach La Spezia. In August 1942, on his eighth and final patrol (4 August 1942 – 5 September 1942) on U-73, Rosenbaum attempted an attack on convoy WS 21S of Operation Pedestal bound for Malta. On 11 August 1942 he made contact with the convoy, which included HMS Eagle and fired four torpedoes at the aircraft carrier, sinking it.

Following his command of U-73, he took command of the 30th U-boat Flotilla on 1 October 1942. At the same time he held the position of Admiralstabsoffizier (Asto—officer of the admiralty staff) in the staff of the Admiral of the Black Sea. Helmut Rosenbaum was killed in an airplane crash on 10 May 1944 near Constanţa in Romania as commander of the 30th U-boat Flotilla. Rosenbaum was posthumously promoted to Korvettenkapitän (LT Commander) on 3 August 1944 with an effective date as of 1 May 1944.

== Awards ==
- Wehrmacht Long Service Award 4th Class (15 August 1936)
- Spanish Cross in Bronze (6 June 1939)
- Iron Cross (1939)
  - 2nd Class (15 April 1940)
  - 1st Class (25 April 1941)
- U-boat War Badge (4 March 1941)
- Silver Medal of Military Valor (17 September 1942)
- Knight's Cross of the Iron Cross on 12 August 1942 as Kapitänleutnant and commander of U-73

== Translation notes ==
Military offices
Preceded by Kapitänleutnant Herbert Schultze	Commanding officer, U-2; 17 March 1939 – 5 August 1940	Succeeded by Kapitänleutnant Georg von Wilamowitz-Moellendorf
First	Commanding officer, U-73; 30 September 1940 – 30 September 1942	Succeeded by Kapitänleutnant Horst Deckert
