= Convoy SC 26 =

- Part of World War II
Date	2–5 April 1941
Location	North Atlantic
Result	German victory

Belligerents
Germany	United Kingdom

Commanders and leaders
Admiral Karl Dönitz	Comm: G Swabey; SOE: Cdr J Cresswell; Cdr J Rowlands

Strength
7 U-boats	23 ships 7 escorts

Casualties and losses
1 U-boat destroyed	10 ships sunk 2 ships damaged 1 warship damaged 97 killed

SC 26 was a North Atlantic convoy of the SC series which ran during the battle of the Atlantic in World War II.

== Prelude ==
SC 26 was an east-bound convoy of 23 ships which sailed from Halifax on 20 March 1941 bound for Liverpool. It carried war materials and was led by Commodore GTC Swabey in SS Magician.

SC 26 comprised 23 ships and was escorted only by the Armed Merchant Cruiser (AMC) Worcestershire (Cdr J Cresswell). At this stage of the campaign escorts against U-boat attack could only be provided in the Western Approaches; the Ocean escort, usually an AMC, was provided to give some protection against surface raiders.

SC 26 was opposed by a patrol line of nine U-boats, positioned at the limit of endurance to intercept east-bound convoys before the Western Approaches escort had joined. These were U-46, U-69, U-73, U-74, U-97, U-98 and U-101. Two other boats, U-94 and U-76, were moving west to join the line. This patrol line was unnamed; at this stage of the campaign patrol lines did not carry identifying names, as they did later, though if a wolfpack formed it was referred to by the name of the sighting captain.

On 1 April 1941 an outbound U-boat, U-76 (Hippel), on her way to join the newly formed patrol line south of Iceland sighted a west-bound convoy in the North-West Approaches. This was OB 305, of 51 ships. Hippel reported this, but U-boat Command (BdU) was reluctant to engage so close to Britain and within range of Coastal Command aircraft; he ordered Hippel to shadow OB 305 westwards and moved the patrol line to intercept. U-76 followed the convoy during the day, but lost contact when she was forced to dive by approaching trawlers. Hippel was ordered to follow west to try to regain contact. As they did so, one of the boats on the patrol line, U-74 (Kentrat), made contact with an east-bound convoy, SC 26, which BdU determined to attack. After sending a sighting report, Kentrat commenced shadowing, and was joined throughout the day by three other U-boats that were nearby.

== Action ==
After first sighting on 2 April 1941 U-74 commenced shadowing, while the other boats in the area were drawn in for the attack. By evening of 2 April BdU had gathered a pack of 4 U-boats, (U-46, U-69, U-74 and U-76) who commenced a devastating attack.

The first assault, during the night of 2/3 April, was made by U-46 (Endrass) just after midnight; She fired on British Reliance, which sank; Alderpool, which was damaged, to be sunk later by the newly arrived U-73; and Thirlby, which had stopped to pick up survivors, but escaped harm.

Just after 4am the pack attacked again; Leonidas Z Cambanis was hit by U-74 and sank, followed a few minutes later by Westpool and Indier, both hit by U-73 (Rosenbaum).

With the loss of 5 ships already, nearly a quarter of the convoy, Swabey determined the ships would be less vulnerable if they were dispersed, and at 4.21 am the decision was made to scatter the convoy. As the convoy started to scatter, a 6th ship, the tanker British Viscount, was hit by U-73 and burst into flames, illuminating the scene. Shortly after, Worcestershire was hit by U-74; she was sustained severe damage, but remained afloat.

At dawn on 3 October saw ships and U-boats scattered across a wide area; ships were heading east, pursued by U-boats seeking to regain contact, while the warships detailed to escort SC 26 hurried west. During the morning Swabey in Magician met a number of ships which he gathered together, to reform the convoy; these eight ships were met later in the day by destroyers Wolverine (LtCdr J Rowlands, as Senior Officer Escort), and Veteran. Worcestershire, moving under her own steam, was met by the destroyer Hurricane, which escorted her back to Liverpool. Two other destroyers, Havelock and Hesperus, arrived at the battle site and searched for survivors.

Six other ships remained scattered; just before midday U-98, newly arrived, found Helle, which she stalked and sank. In midafternoon U-98 found and sank Welcombe, also travelling alone.

Also on 3rd U-76, still moving west, encountered Daphne, a Finnish freighter sailing independently, and sank her.

At dusk on the evening of 3/4 April U-94, also newly arrived, found the main body again. She attacked, sinking Harbledown, but all further attacks were driven off.

During 4 April there were no further attacks on Swabeys group, and SC 26 was joined by 3 more destroyers (Verity, Vivien and Chelsea) and a corvette (Convolvulus)

During the night of 4/5 April another ship from SC 26, Athenic, was travelling alone ahead of the main body. She was intercepted by U-76 and sunk. All of her crew were saved, including survivors from the Liguria, whom Athenic had rescued some days before. Another SC 26 ship, Thirlby, also sailing alone, was found and fired on by U-69. She was damaged, but not sunk, and was able to reach port. In the main body, Eelbeck was damaged, but there were no other casualties.

At dawn on 5 April U-76 was running on the surface when she was sighted by Wolverine. As Rowlands approached U-76 dived, and Wolverine attacked, assisted by Scarborough and Arbutus. Wolverine dropped 2 depth charges, followed almost immediately by a full pattern of 8 from Scarborough. U-76 was forced to the surface, and the crew abandoned her. Arbutus rushed in to attempt to secure and capture the boat and its prized cypher equipment, but the boat was filled with chlorine gas from the batteries, and she quickly sank. All U-76 crew but one were rescued.

The pack made no further attacks on the ships of SC 26, who made their way to port. Swabey's group of 8 ships arrived in Liverpool on 8 April 1941; Worcester and Hurricane arrived in port the same day. Thirlby, which was damaged, in company with Loch Ewe, docked three days later on the 11th. Tennessee, carrying survivors from British Reliance, put into port in Ireland, while Tenax and Ethel R docked in Britain.

Nearly half of SC 26 had been lost; 10 ships sunk, for 51,969 tons, with 2 ships and the ocean escort damaged. Nearly 100 sailors lost their lives, in exchange for one U-boat destroyed; most of its crew were rescued.

== Conclusion ==
The U-boat arm had scored another victory, and by managing to shift its point of interception further west, beyond the range of the anti-submarine escorts, ensured a series of successes until Western Approaches Command could adjust.

Arbutus had been unable to capture U-76 and her prized Enigma machine, but this breakthrough was just 4 weeks away with the seizure of U-110 in May, with a profound effect on the course of the Atlantic campaign.

== Ships in Convoy ==
=== Merchant Ships ===
Name	Flag	Dead	Tonnage (GRT)	Cargo	Notes
British Reliance (1928)	United Kingdom	0	7,000	9,967 tons gas oil	Sunk by U-46 on 2 April
Alderpool (1930)	United Kingdom	0	4,313	7,200 tons wheat	Sunk by U-46 on 3 April
Leonidas Z Cambanis (1917)	Greece	2	4,274	6,500 tons wheat	Sunk by U-73 on 3 April
Westpool (1918)	United Kingdom	35	5,724	7,144 tons scrap iron	Sunk by U-74 on 3 April
Indier (1918)	Belgium	42	5,409	General cargo incl. 6,300 tons steel	Sunk by U-73 on 3 April
British Viscount (1921)	United Kingdom		6,895	Fuel oil	Sunk by U-73 on 3 April
Helle (1918)	Norway	0	2,467	350 tons steel & 2,600 tons woodpulp	Sunk by U-98 on 4 April
Welcombe (1930)	United Kingdom	15	5,122	Wheat	Sunk by U-98 on 3 April
Harbledown (1933)	United Kingdom	3	5,414	Wheat	Sunk by U-94 on the night of 3/4 April after convoy was scattered
Athenic (1937)	United Kingdom	0	5,351	Grain	Sunk by U-76 on 4 April
Magician (1925)	United Kingdom		5,105	Steel & lumber	Carried convoy commodore Vice-Admiral G T C P Swabey CB DSO
Akabahra (1929)	Norway		1,524	Lumber	Returned to Canada
Anacortes (1918)	United Kingdom		4,889	Steel & scrap	
Daleby (1929)	United Kingdom		4,640	Grain	Survived this convoy to be sunk in convoy SC 107
Editor (1919)	United Kingdom		6,326	Steel & motor vehicles	
Eelbeck (1919)	United Kingdom		6,318	Scrap & motor vehicles	
Empire Dew (1941)	United Kingdom		7,005	Flour	
Ethel Radcliffe (1920)	United Kingdom		5,673	Grain	
Havtor (1930)	Norway		1,524	Pit props	
Hontestroom (1921)	Netherlands		1,857		Rescue ship
Nea (1921)	Norway		1,877	Bauxite	Took refuge in Iceland
Taygetos (1918)	Greece		4,295	Grain	
Tenax (1925)	United Kingdom		3,846	Grain	
Tennessee (1921)	United Kingdom		2,342	Grain	Took refuge in Iceland
Thirlby (1928)	United Kingdom		4,887	Wheat	

=== Allied Warships Hit ===
Date	Name	Nationality	Casualties	Type	Fate	Hit by...
2/3 April 1941	Worcestershire	British	?	AMC	damaged	U-74

=== U-boats Destroyed ===
Date	Number	Type	Captain	Casualties	Fate	Sunk by...
5 April 1941	U-76	VIIB	Oberleutnant Friedrich von Hippel	1	Destroyed	HMS Wolverine (D78); HMS Scarborough (L25); HMS Arbutus (K86)

== Sources ==
- Blair, Clay (2000). Hitler's U-Boat War: The Hunters 1939–1942. London: Cassell. ISBN 0-304-35260-8.
- Arnold Hague, The Allied Convoy System 1939–1945 (2000). ISBN 1-55125-033-0 (Canada) . ISBN 1-86176-147-3 (UK)
- Stephen Roskill, The War at Sea 1939–1945 Vol I (1954). ISBN (none)
- David White, Bitter Ocean (2006). ISBN 0-7553-1088-8
