= German submarine U-73 (1940) =

German World War II submarine

History

Nazi Germany
- Name: U-73
- Ordered: 2 June 1938
- Builder: Vegesacker Werft
- Cost: 4,760,000 Reichsmark
- Yard number: 1
- Laid down: 5 November 1939
- Launched: 27 July 1940
- Commissioned: 30 September 1940
- Fate: Sunk, 16 December 1943

General characteristics
- Class & type: Type VIIB U-boat
- Displacement: 753 t (741 long tons) surfaced; 857 t (843 long tons) submerged
- Length: 66.50 m (218 ft 2 in) o/a; 48.80 m (160 ft 1 in) pressure hull
- Beam: 6.20 m (20 ft 4 in) o/a; 4.70 m (15 ft 5 in) pressure hull
- Draught: 4.74 m (15 ft 7 in)
- Installed power: 2,800–3,200 PS (2,100–2,400 kW; 2,800–3,200 bhp) (diesels); 750 PS (550 kW; 740 shp) (electric)
- Propulsion: 2 propeller shafts; 2 × diesel engines; 2 × electric motors
- Speed: 17.9 knots (33.2 km/h; 20.6 mph) surfaced; 8 knots (15 km/h; 9.2 mph)
- Range: 8,700 nmi (16,100 km; 10,000 mi) at 10 knots (19 km/h; 12 mph) surfaced; 90 nmi (170 km; 100 mi) at 4 knots (7.4 km/h; 4.6 mph) submerged
- Test depth: 230 m (750 ft); Calculated crush depth: 250–295 m (820–968 ft)
- Boats & landing craft carried: 1 inflatable rubber boat
- Complement: 4 officers, 40 to 56 enlisted
- Sensors & processing systems: FuMO 61 Hohentwiel U; Gruppenhorchgerät
- Armament: 5 × 53.3 cm (21 in) torpedo tubes (four bow, one stern); 14 × torpedoes or 26 TMA mines; 1 × 8.8 cm (3.46 in) deck gun (220 rounds); 1 × 2 cm (0.79 in) C/30 anti-aircraft gun

Service record
- Part of: 7th U-boat Flotilla; 30 September 1940 – 1 January 1942; 29th U-boat Flotilla; 1 January 1942 – 16 December 1943
- Identification codes: M 09 142
- Commanders: Kptlt. Helmut Rosenbaum; 30 September 1940 – 10 September 1942; Oblt.z.S. Horst Deckert; 1 October 1942 – 16 December 1943
- Operations: 15 patrols: 1st patrol: 8 February – 2 March 1941; 2nd patrol: 25 March – 24 April 1941; 3rd patrol: a. 20 May – 24 June 1941; b. 29 July – 2 August 1941; 4th patrol: 7 August – 7 September 1941; 5th patrol: 11 October – 11 November 1941; 6th patrol: 4 January – 12 February 1942; 7th patrol: 16 – 26 March 1942; 8th patrol: 4 August – 5 September 1942; 9th patrol: 20 October – 19 November 1942; 10th patrol: 1 – 8 December 1942; 11th patrol: 22 December – 13 January 1943; 12th patrol: 12 June – 1 July 1943; 13th patrol: 2 – 29 August 1943; 14th patrol: 5 – 30 October 1943; 15th patrol: 4 – 16 December 1943
- Victories: 8 merchant ships sunk (43,945 GRT); 4 warships sunk (22,947 tons); 3 merchant ships damaged (22,928 GRT)

German submarine U-73 was a Type VIIB U-boat of Nazi Germany's Kriegsmarine during World War II. She was laid down by Vegesacker Werft, Germany as yard number 1 on 5 November 1939, launched on 27 July 1940 and commissioned on 30 September of the same year under Kapitänleutnant (Kptlt.) Helmut Rosenbaum.

U-73 carried out 15 patrols between early 1941 and late 1943, sinking eight ships and four warships. She also damaged a further three commercial vessels. She was part of five wolfpacks. She was sunk by two US warships, USS Woolsey and Trippe, off the North African coast on 16 December 1943 at 36°7′N 0°50′W.

== Design ==
German Type VIIB submarines were preceded by the shorter Type VIIA submarines. U-73 had a displacement of 753 tonnes (741 long tons) when at the surface and 857 tonnes (843 long tons) while submerged. She had a total length of 66.50 m (218 ft 2 in), a pressure hull length of 48.80 m (160 ft 1 in), a beam of 6.20 m (20 ft 4 in), a height of 9.50 m (31 ft 2 in), and a draught of 4.74 m (15 ft 7 in). The submarine was powered by two MAN M 6 V 40/46 four-stroke, six-cylinder supercharged diesel engines producing a total of 2,800 to 3,200 metric horsepower (2,060 to 2,350 kW; 2,760 to 3,160 shp) for use while surfaced, two BBC GG UB 720/8 double-acting electric motors producing a total of 750 metric horsepower (550 kW; 740 shp) for use while submerged. She had two shafts and two 1.23 m (4 ft) propellers. The boat was capable of operating at depths of up to 230 metres (750 ft).

The submarine had a maximum surface speed of 17.9 knots (33.2 km/h; 20.6 mph) and a maximum submerged speed of 8 knots (15 km/h; 9.2 mph). When submerged, the boat could operate for 90 nautical miles (170 km; 100 mi) at 4 knots (7.4 km/h; 4.6 mph); when surfaced, she could travel 8,700 nautical miles (16,100 km; 10,000 mi) at 10 knots (19 km/h; 12 mph). U-73 was fitted with five 53.3 cm (21 in) torpedo tubes (four fitted at the bow and one at the stern), fourteen torpedoes, one 8.8 cm (3.46 in) SK C/35 naval gun, 220 rounds, and one 2 cm (0.79 in) anti-aircraft gun The boat had a complement of between forty-four and sixty.

== Service history ==
=== First patrol ===
U-73 departed the Helgoland (also known as Heligoland) for her first patrol on 8 February 1941. Her route took her the length of the North Sea, through the 'gap' separating the Faroe and Shetland Islands, north-west toward Iceland, then south and west.

She sank the Waynegate on 24 February 1941 south of Iceland.

The boat arrived at Lorient, on the French Atlantic coast, on 2 March.

=== Second patrol ===
U-73 sank three ships on the same day, 3 April 1941. They were: the Alderpool, the Westpool and the British Viscount, all in the vicinity of Iceland.

Her next victim was SS Empire Endurance on 20 April, southwest of Rockall; also lost when this ship went down were two launches which were being carried as deck cargo: ML-1003 and M-1037.

=== Third, fourth and fifth patrols ===
These sorties were conducted in mid-Atlantic but were uneventful. On 26 May 1941, U-73 was ordered to help the wounded German battleship Bismarck which was under attack from British destroyers. On the night of 26 May U-73 spotted star shells that illuminated Bismarck and also saw the Bismarck firing her guns. But U-73 was unable to attack the destroyers due to Force 7 to 9 winds. U-73 reported the Bismarck's position to Group West but the positions proved inaccurate. U-73 then returned to port in France.

=== Sixth patrol ===
U-73 entered the Mediterranean Sea via the heavily defended Straits of Gibraltar on 14 January 1942 during her sixth patrol. Rosenbaum claimed to have sunk a destroyer in February, but post-war records offer no confirmation. She docked at La Spezia in Italy on 12 February.

=== Seventh patrol ===
The submarine was attacked by a Bristol Blenheim of No. 203 Squadron RAF about 50 nautical miles (93 km; 58 mi) north northwest of Derna in Libya on 22 March 1942. The damage was such that the boat was unable to dive and had to return to La Spezia on 26 March 1942. The U-boat was under repair at La Spezia for four months.

=== Eighth patrol ===
On 11 August 1942 she sank the aircraft carrier HMS Eagle during Operation Pedestal (supplying Malta). Rosenbaum was awarded the Knight's Cross and sent to command the Black Sea U-boat flotilla.

=== Ninth patrol ===
First watch officer Horst Deckert was promoted to command U-73. He was the son of German-American parents living in Chicago and had joined U-73's crew as a midshipman in 1940. U-73 was depth-charged during an unsuccessful attack on Operation Torch (the invasion of French North Africa) troopships on 7 November. On 10 November, U-73 missed the battleship HMS Rodney with four torpedoes launched at a range of five kilometers.

She also damaged the Lalande off Oran on 14 November 1942. This ship was under repair until June 1943.

=== Tenth and eleventh patrols ===
U-73 was damaged in an air attack on 5 December 1942 and forced to return to base.

The boat was also attacked by a British Lockheed Hudson of 500 Squadron on 27 December 1942; damage was slight – the Hudson was shot down. She sank the 7,200-ton American Liberty ship SS Arthur Middleton from the convoy UGS 3 on 1 January 1943 3 nautical miles (5.6 km; 3.5 mi) off Oran.

=== 12th patrol ===
As allied forces prepared for Operation Husky (the invasion of Sicily), U-73 sank the 1,600-ton British freighter Brinkburn off Oran on 21 June 1943 and damaged the 8,300-ton Royal Navy oiler Abbeydale on 28 June 1943. The Brinkburn exploded with such force that damaged food cans and two 75 mm shells, still in their transit boxes, were found on the U-boat's bridge.

The boat tied up at Toulon in France on 1 July 1943.

=== 13th patrol ===
Patrol number thirteen took U-73 to Sicily; she reached the Straits of Messina (between the island and the Italian mainland), on 19 August 1943.

=== 14th patrol ===
U-73 was attacked by the British submarine HMS Ultimatum south-east of Toulon on 30 October 1943 (just before the end of her patrol). The torpedo missed.

=== 15th patrol and loss ===
U-73 found the convoy GUS-24 off Oran on 16 December 1943 and torpedoed the 7,200-ton American Liberty ship SS John S. Copley. As the damaged vessel returned to port, the destroyers USS Woolsey, USS Trippe and USS Edison left Mers-el-Kebir to find the U-boat. She was located by sonar at 18:15. Hull turbulence made the U-boat's hydrophones ineffective at the speed U-73 was leaving the area, so she was unaware of the destroyers until Woolsey's pattern of depth charges exploded below the submarine at 18:39. Sea water poured in between the bow torpedo tubes and from a salt water inlet valve for the diesel engine cooling system. All ballast tanks were blown to bring U-73 to the surface as inflowing water exceeded pumping capacity. U-73 surfaced in darkness at 19:27 and men manned the heavy machine guns. The destroyers promptly detected her on radar and illuminated the submarine with searchlights. She sank by the stern following a brief exchange of gunfire, 34 of the crew were rescued by 22:10. Three of Woolsey's crew were wounded by machine gun fire and sixteen of the U-boat crew perished.

=== Wolfpacks ===
U-73 took part in five wolfpacks, namely:

- West (31 May – 16 June 1941)
- Kurfürst (16 – 20 June 1941)
- Grönland (12 – 27 August 1941)
- Reissewolf (21 – 31 October 1941)
- Wal (10 – 15 November 1942)

== Summary of raiding history ==
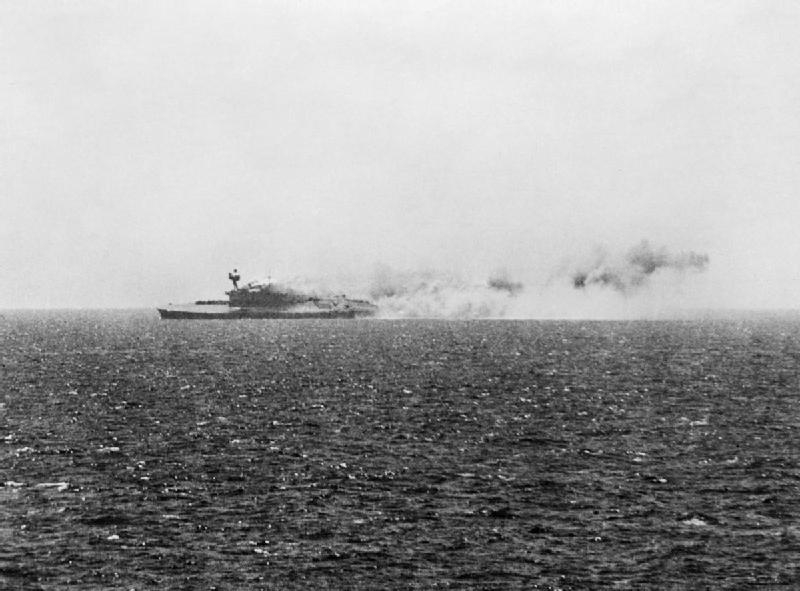
HMS Eagle sinking, 11 August 1942

Date	Ship	Nationality	Tonnage (Note: Merchant ship tonnages are in gross register tons. Military vessels are listed by tons displacement.)	Convoy	Fate
24 March 1941	Waynegate	United Kingdom	4,260	OB 288	Sunk
3 April 1941	Alderpool	United Kingdom	4,313	SC 26	Sunk
3 April 1941	British Viscount	United Kingdom	6,895	SC 26	Sunk
3 April 1941	Indier	Belgium	5,409	SC 26	Sunk
3 April 1941	Westpool	United Kingdom	5,724	SC 26	Sunk
20 April 1941	Empire Endurance	United Kingdom	8,570		Sunk
20 April 1941	HMS ML 1003*	Royal Navy	46		Sunk
20 April 1941	HMS ML 1037*	Royal Navy	46		Sunk
11 August 1942	HMS Eagle	Royal Navy	22,600	WS 21S	Sunk
14 November 1942	Lalande	United Kingdom	7,453	Operation Torch	Damaged
1 January 1943	Arthur Middleton	United States	7,176	UGS 3	Sunk
1 January 1943	USS LCT-21**	United States Navy	255	UGS 3	Sunk
21 June 1943	Brinkburn	United Kingdom	1,598	TE 22	Sunk
27 June 1943	Abbeydale	United Kingdom	8,299	XTG 2	Damaged
16 December 1943	John S. Copley	United States	7,176	GUS 24	Damaged

* Carried by Empire Endurance

** Carried by Arthur Middleton

== Sensors ==
=== Radar ===
U-73 was one of the few U-boats to be fitted with a FuMO 61 Hohentwiel U-Radar system. It was installed on the starboard side of the conning tower.

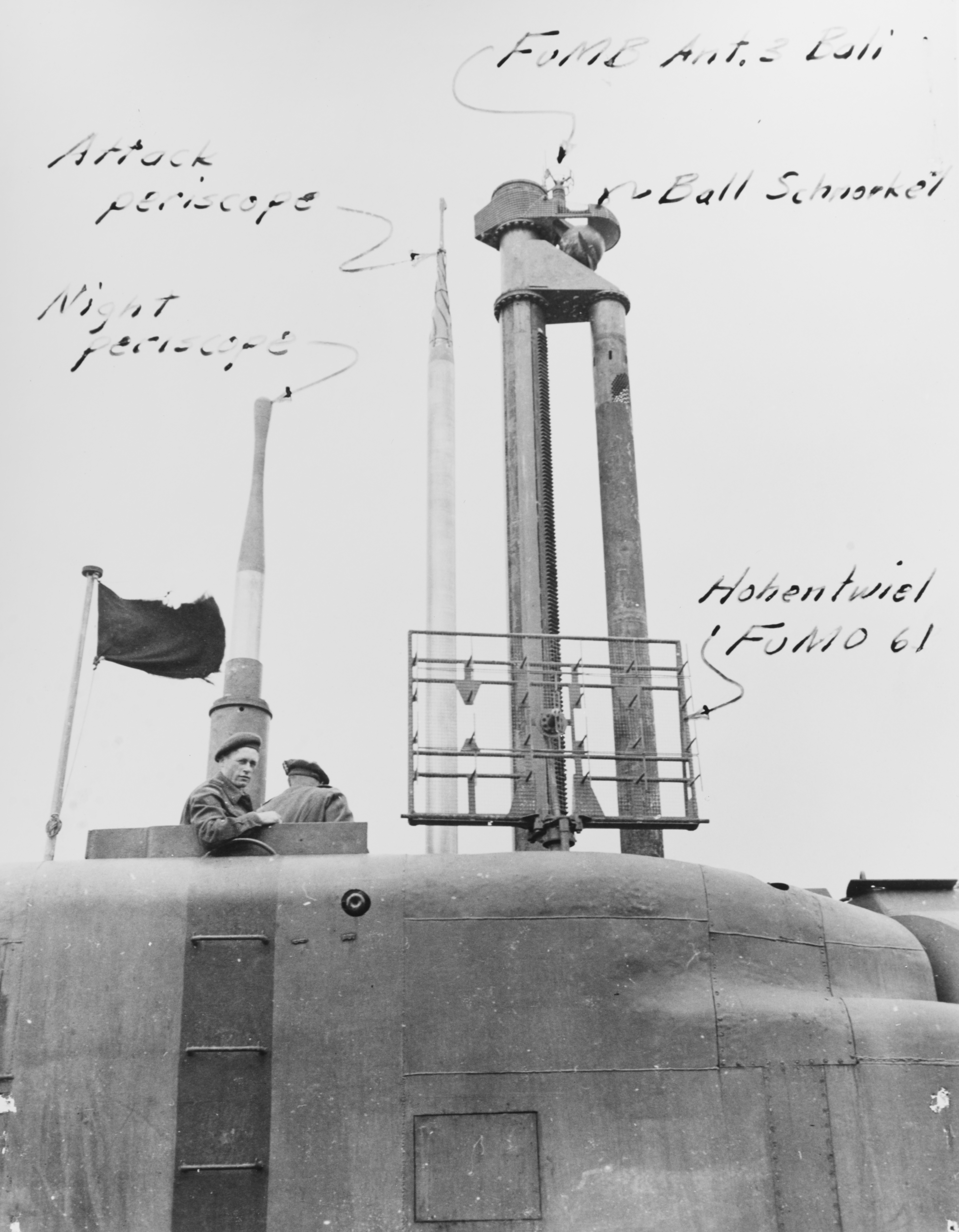
FuMO 61 Hohentwiel on U-3008

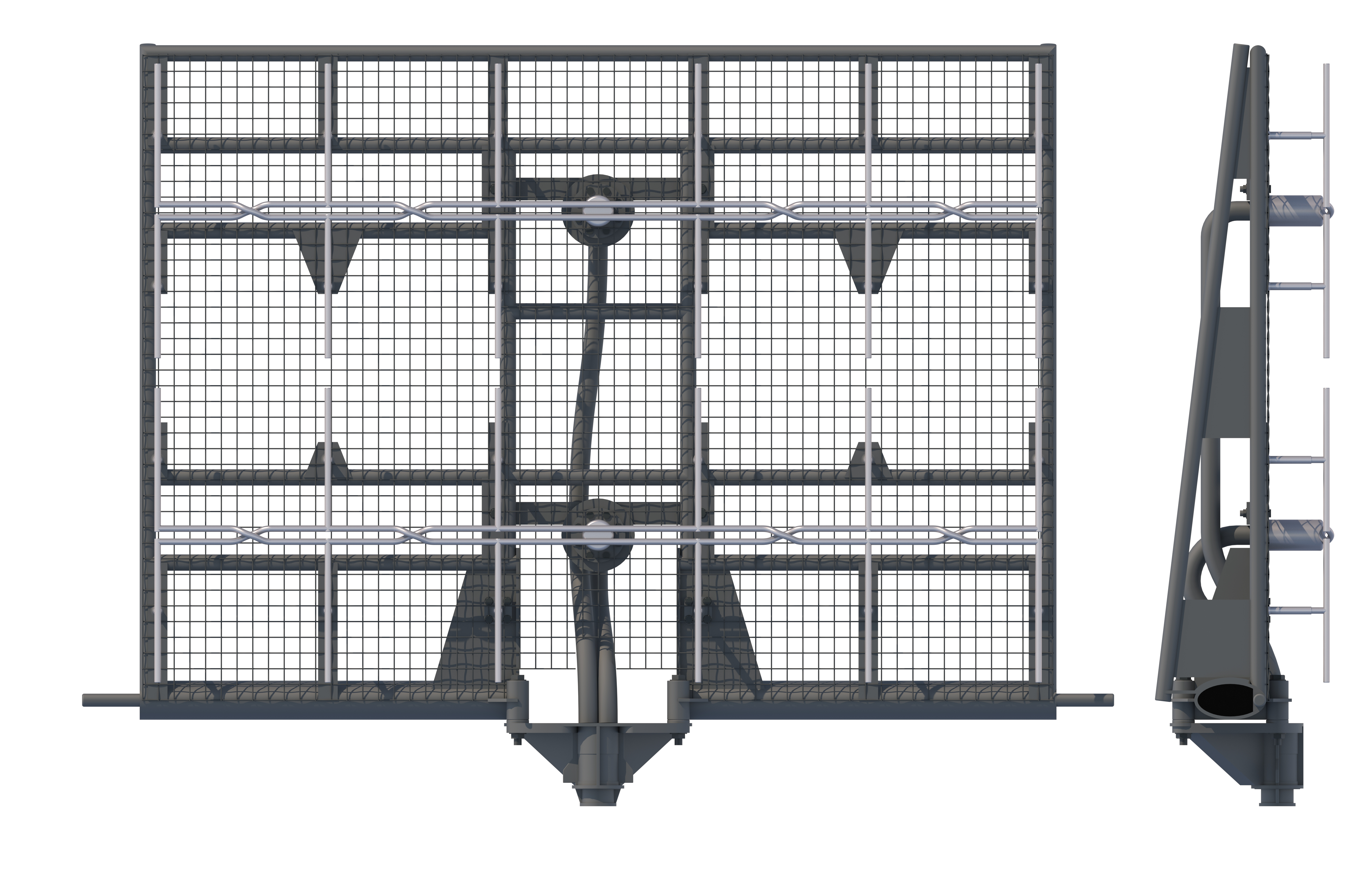
FuMO 61 Hohentwiel U-Radar antenna

== See also ==
- Convoy SC 26
- Mediterranean U-boat Campaign (World War II)

== Bibliography ==
- Blair, Clay (1996). Hitler's U-Boat War – The Hunters 1939–1942. Random House. ISBN 0-394-58839-8.
- Blair, Clay (1998). Hitler's U-Boat War The Hunted 1942–1945. Random House. ISBN 0-679-45742-9.
- Busch, Rainer; Röll, Hans-Joachim (1999). German U-boat commanders of World War II: a biographical dictionary. Translated by Brooks, Geoffrey. London, Annapolis, Md: Greenhill Books, Naval Institute Press. ISBN 1-55750-186-6.
- Busch, Rainer; Röll, Hans-Joachim (1999). Deutsche U-Boot-Verluste von September 1939 bis Mai 1945 [German U-boat losses from September 1939 to May 1945]. Der U-Boot-Krieg (in German). Vol. IV. Hamburg, Berlin, Bonn: Mittler. ISBN 3-8132-0514-2.
- Gröner, Erich; Jung, Dieter; Maass, Martin (1991). German Warships 1815–1945, U-boats and Mine Warfare Vessels. Vol. 2. Translated by Thomas, Keith; Magowan, Rachel. London: Conway Maritime Press. ISBN 0-85177-593-4.
- Lenton, H.T. (1976). German Warships of the Second World War. Arco Publishing Company. ISBN 0-668-04037-8.
- Sanders, Harry (January 1969). "Night Fight Off Oran". Proceedings. United States Naval Institute.
