= Georg Schewe =

German navy officer and WWII submarine commander (1909–1989)

- Born: 24 November 1909; Ueckermünde
- Died: 16 September 1989 (aged 79); Hamburg
- Military career
- Allegiance: Nazi Germany
- Branch: Kriegsmarine
- Rank: Korvettenkapitän
- Units: SSS Niobe; Schnellboot S-5; U-15
- Commands: U-60; U-105
- Conflicts: World War II: Battle of the Atlantic
- Awards: Knight's Cross of the Iron Cross

Georg Schewe (24 November 1909 – 16 September 1989) was a German officer with the Kriegsmarine during World War II. He was a recipient of the Knight's Cross of the Iron Cross. Schewe sailed with U-60 and U-105, sinking 16 ships on 10 patrols, for a total of 85,779 tons of Allied shipping, of which 71,450 tons were on one patrol alone. It was the second-most-successful patrol of World War II, second only to Günter Hessler's patrol on U-107.

== Awards ==
- Wehrmacht Long Service Award 4th Class (2 October 1936)
- Iron Cross (1939) 2nd Class (20 December 1939) & 1st Class (13 June 1940)
- Sudetenland Medal (20 December 1939)
- U-boat War Badge (1939) (24 January 1940)
- Knight's Cross of the Iron Cross on 23 May 1941 as Kapitänleutnant and commander of U-105

Military offices
First	Commanding officer, U-60; 22 July 1939 – 19 July 1940	Succeeded by Kapitänleutnant Adalbert Schnee
First	Commanding officer, U-105; 10 September 1940 – 6 January 1942	Succeeded by Kapitänleutnant Heinrich Schuch
Preceded by —	Commander of the 33rd U-boat Flotilla; September – October 1944	Succeeded by Korvettenkapitän Günter Kuhnke
