= Otto Ites =

German naval officer

- Otto Ites
- Born: 5 February 1918; Norden, German Empire
- Died: 2 February 1982 (aged 63); Norden, West Germany
- Military career
- Allegiance: Nazi Germany (to 1945); West Germany
- Branch: Kriegsmarine; German Navy
- Service years: 1936–42; 1956–77
- Rank: Kapitänleutnant (Kriegsmarine); Konteradmiral (Bundesmarine)
- Commands: U-146; U-94; destroyer Zerstörer 2 (D171)
- Conflicts: World War II Battle of the Atlantic
- Awards: Knight's Cross of the Iron Cross; Order of Merit
- Other work: Dentist

Otto Christian Ites (5 February 1918 – 2 February 1982) was a German naval officer, serving first as a submarine commander with the Kriegsmarine during World War II, and later as Konteradmiral with the Bundesmarine.

== Career ==
Otto Ites, born on 5 February 1918 in Norden in the Province of Hanover a Free State of Prussia, joined the military service of the Kriegsmarine on 3 April 1936. From 3 April 1938 until 2 October 1939, he served on the torpedo boats Kondor and Albatros in the 4th and 6th Torpedo Boat Flotilla.

Ites served as second watch officer on nine war patrols on U-48, the first five patrols under the command of Herbert Schultze, two patrols under Hans-Rudolf Rösing and two patrols under Heinrich Bleichrodt. Promoted to Oberleutnant zur See on 1 October 1940 and he was made first watch officer on U-48. In this position he went on one more patrol (10 November 1940 – 13 March 1941), U-48 now again under the command of Schultze.

He commanded U-146 and U-94, sinking fifteen ships on seven patrols, for a total of 76,882 gross register tons (GRT) tons of Allied shipping. In September 1941 the Pegasus was torpedoed and all the crew managed to scramble into two lifeboats. One of the lifeboats was rescued but the other was found empty and upside down. The Captain reported that the Pegasus was torpedoed twice, the first one caused quite a lot of damage and the crew left the ship, but then she was torpedoed again and she sank. On 28 August 1942 U-94 was sunk by depth charges in the Caribbean Sea, in position 17°40′N 74°30′W from a Catalina of VP-92 and by the Canadian corvette Oakville. Ites and 25 of his crew were taken prisoner of war. Ites remained in US captivity at Camp Crossville, Tennessee, until 1 May 1946.

After the war Otto Ites matriculated at the University of Bonn in the winter semester 1946/47. He submitted his dissertation on 20 October 1950 at the medical faculty. Ites joined the military service of the Bundesmarine and as Fregattenkapitän commanded the destroyer Zerstörer 2 (D171), formerly USS Ringgold (DD-500), from November 1960 until September 1962. His twin brother, Oberleutnant zur See Rudolf Ites, commander of U-709, was killed in action on 1 March 1944. U-709 was sunk by depth charges from the US destroyer escorts USS Thomas, Bostwick and Bronstein north of the Azores at 49°10′N 26°00′W.

== Awards ==
- Iron Cross (1939)
  - 2nd Class (27 October 1939)
  - 1st Class (25 February 1940)
- U-boat War Badge (1939) (21 December 1939)
- Knight's Cross of the Iron Cross on 28 March 1942 as Oberleutnant zur See and commander of U-94

Military offices
Preceded by Fregattenkapitän Günter Kuhnke	Commander of German destroyer Z-2 (formerly USS Ringgold); December 1960 – September 1962	Succeeded by Fregattenkapitän Paul Brasack
Preceded by Konteradmiral Günter Luther	Chief of the Navy Office; 1 April 1975 – 30 September 1977	Succeeded by Konteradmiral Horst Geffers
