= Hans-Rudolf Rösing =

German U-boat commander

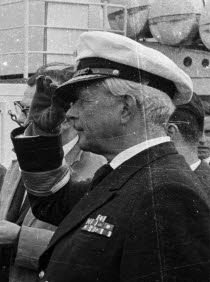
- Rösing in 1963
- Born: 28 September 1905; Wilhelmshaven, German Empire
- Died: 16 December 2004 (aged 99); Kiel, Schleswig-Holstein, Germany
- Relatives: Bernhard Rösing (father)
- Military career
- Allegiance: Weimar Republic (to 1933); Nazi Germany (to 1945); West Germany
- Branch: Reichsmarine; Kriegsmarine; German Navy
- Service years: 1924–45; 1956–65
- Rank: Kapitän zur See (Kriegsmarine); Konteradmiral (Bundesmarine)
- Commands: Schnellboot S-15 and S-3; U-11, U-35, U-10, U-48
- Conflicts: World War II
- Awards: Knight's Cross of the Iron Cross; Bundesverdienstkreuz

Hans-Rudolf Rösing (28 September 1905 – 16 December 2004) was a German U-boat commander in World War II and later served in the Bundesmarine of the Federal Republic of Germany. He was a recipient of the Knight's Cross of the Iron Cross, of Nazi Germany.

== Early life and pre-war service ==
Rösing was born on 28 September 1905 in Wilhelmshaven, at the time an exclave of the Province of Hanover, a province of the Kingdom of Prussia. He was the son of Vizeadmiral Bernhard Rösing (1869–1947) and his wife Elfriede, née Wünsche (1882–1961). He had three brothers, Wilhelm, Kurt-Wolf and Bernhard, all killed during World War II, and a sister named Elfriede.

He joined the Reichsmarine on 31 March 1924. During this training period he advanced in rank to Fähnrich zur See (officer cadet) on 1 April 1926.

Following additional, land based trainings he was stationed on Nymphe for 13 months (9 January 1928 – 10 March 1929). While stationed on Nymphe he was commissioned as officer and attained the rank Leutnant zur See (Second Lieutenant) on 1 October 1928. He then participated in the training course (11 March 1929 – 27 March 1929) for naval anti-aircraft artillery at Wilhelmshaven before again boarding Nymphe for three weeks (28 March 1929 – 16 April 1929).

Rösing was then stationed on Königsberg (17 April 1929 – 31 October 1929) before he was appointed company officer with the 2nd department of the standing ship division of the Baltic Sea on 1 November 1929. During this assignment he was promoted to Oberleutnant zur See (First Lieutenant) on 1 April 1930. Germany was forbidden to operate submarines under the Treaty of Versailles and Rösing was one of a small number of chosen personnel who were detached to foreign navies to gain submarine experience. On 6 February 1931 he was officially assigned to the special task force of the naval command and put on an exchange program with the Swedish Navy. After this assignment on 10 July 1931 he was transferred back to the 2nd department of the standing ship division (11 July 1931 – 21 September 1931). During this posting he also spent one month on board the sailing yacht Asta (1 August 1931 – 30 August 1931).

His next assignment (22 September 1931 – 22 December 1931) placed him on the Admiral's staff at the Baltic Naval Station, while in parallel he attended a technical officers training course at the Naval Academy at Mürwik. Rösing was then transferred to the 1st Schnellboot-Demi-Flotilla (23 December 1931 – 1 October 1933) where he commanded his first boat, Schnellboot S-15. During this command he attended two more training courses, anti-gas defence (4 February 1932 – 17 February 1932) and a Spanish language interpreter training vacation (5 May 1932 – 15 June 1932). He passed his Spanish interpreter test on 26 October 1932. From 4 November 1932 the end of his assignment with the 1st Schnellboot-Demi-Flotilla on 1 October 1933 he commanded S-3.

After spending two years at the Unterseebootsabwehrschule, Rösing, recently promoted Kapitänleutnant, was given his first submarine command when he commissioned the new U-11. After two years in this small Type IIB coastal submarine, he took command of U-35, a larger Type VIIA ocean-going boat. In 1937 Rösing was given command of another Type IIB, U-10, and assigned to the Torpedoerprobungskommando, responsible for the testing of new torpedo types. After a year in this post he was appointed commander of 5th U-boat Flotilla - Flotille Emsmann - at Kiel.

== World War II ==
July 1939 saw Rösing promoted to Korvettenkapitän. Following a short spell of duty on the staff of the Befehlshaber der U-Boote (Dönitz, q.v.), Rösing was posted to command 7th U-boat Flotilla at Kiel. This command lasted until 21 May 1940, at which time he took over the Type VIIB boat U-48 from her highly successful previous commander, Herbert Schultze. His crew, among others, included the highly experienced 1st Watch Officer Reinhard Suhren, 2nd Watch Officer Otto Ites and chief engineer Erich Zürn. In the course of his two war patrols with U-48, Rösing sank 12 ships totaling over 60,000 tons and led a wolfpack dubbed Rösing's wolfpack. These achievements earned him the U-Boat War Badge, Iron Cross First Class and Knight's Cross of the Iron Cross.

Rösing left U-48 in December 1940, and was appointed liaison officer to the Italian submarine force operating out of Bordeaux in occupied France. After some months he was given command of 3rd U-boat Flotilla, but in August 1941 returned to the staff of the Befehlshaber der U-boote. In July 1942, Rösing was appointed as FdU West (Führer der Unterseeboote West), with headquarters in both Paris and at Château de Pignerolle near Angers; he was responsible for all boats committed to the Battle of the Atlantic, and thus a great majority of the entire U-boat fleet. In February 1943 he was promoted to Fregattenkapitän, and one month later to Kapitän zur See. He remained as FdU West until autumn 1944, when the Allied liberation of France forced the Kriegsmarine to transfer the remaining boats of 2nd and 7th U-boat flotillas to bases in Norway, Denmark, and northern Germany.

== Later life ==
After the German surrender in May 1945, Rösing spent about a year in British captivity before being released. Serving as a member of the Naval Historical Team he subsequently joined the post-war Navy, and was given command of German naval units operating in the North Sea (Marine-Abschnittskommando Nordsee), and later Military District I, rising to the rank of Konteradmiral. He retired from active service in 1965, having added the Bundesverdienstkreuz (Federal Service Cross) to his wartime decorations. He died on 16 December 2004, at the age of 99.

== Awards ==
- Iron Cross (1939)
  - 2nd Class (13 February 1940)
  - 1st Class (3 July 1940)
- Knight's Cross of the Iron Cross on 29 August 1940 as chief of the 7th U-boat Flotilla and commander of U-48
- Italian Croce di Guerra with Swords (1 November 1941)
- Commander Cross of Order of the Crown of Italy (1 November 1941)
- Commander Cross of the Order of Merit of the Federal Republic of Germany (8 March 1966)

Military offices
Preceded by none	Commander of 5th U-boat Flotilla; December 1938 – December 1939	Succeeded by Kapitänleutnant Karl-Heinz Moehle
Preceded by Korvettenkapitän Ernst Sobe	Commander of 7th U-boat Flotilla; January 1940 – May 1940	Succeeded by Kapitänleutnant Herbert Sohler
Preceded by Kapitänleutnant Hans Eckermann	Commander of 3rd U-boat Flotilla; March 1941 – July 1941	Succeeded by Kapitänleutnant Herbert Schultze
