= German submarine U-146 =

U-146 may refer to one of the following German submarines:

- SM U-146, a Type U 142 submarine laid down during the First World War but unfinished at the end of the war; broken up incomplete 1919–20
  - During the First World War, Germany also had this submarine with a similar name:
    - SM UB-146, a Type UB III submarine launched in 1918 and but unfinished at the end of the war; broken up incomplete in 1919
- German submarine U-146 (1940), a Type IID submarine that served in the Second World War until scuttled 2 May 1945; wreck broken up at later date
