= SS Empire Dew =

World War II merchant ship of the United Kingdom

History
- Name: Empire Dew
- Owner: Ministry of War Transport
- Port of registry: Greenock, United Kingdom
- Builder: Lithgows Ltd
- Yard number: 940
- Launched: 21 November 1940
- Completed: January 1941
- Maiden voyage: 2 February 1941
- Out of service: 12 June 1941
- Identification: United Kingdom Official Number 166993; Code Letters GPFM
- Fate: Torpedoed and sunk, 12 June 1941

General characteristics
- Type: Cargo ship
- Tonnage: 7,005 GRT; 5,135 NRT
- Length: 432 ft 0 in (131.67 m)
- Beam: 56 ft 2 in (17.12 m)
- Draught: 26 ft 4 in (8.03 m)
- Depth: 34 ft 2 in (10.41 m)
- Installed power: 436 ihp (325 kW)
- Propulsion: Triple expansion steam engine
- Crew: 42 (including DEMS gunners)

Location where Empire Dew was torpedoed.

Empire Dew was a 7,005-gross register ton (GRT) cargo ship that was built in 1940 by Lithgows Ltd, Port Glasgow, United Kingdom, for the Ministry of War Transport (MoWT). She was torpedoed and sunk by U-48 in 1941.

== Description ==
The ship was built in 1940 by Lithgows Ltd, Port Glasgow. She was yard number 940.

The ship was 432 feet 0 inches (131.67 m) long, with a beam of 56 feet 2 inches (17.12 m). She had a depth of 34 feet 2 inches (10.41 m) and a draught of 26 feet 3 inches (8.00 m). She was assessed at 7,005 GRT. 5,135 NRT.

The ship was propelled by a 436 indicated horsepower (325 kW) triple expansion steam engine, which had cylinders of 23 1/2 inches (60 cm), 37 1/2 inches (95 cm) and 68 inches (170 cm) diameter by 48 inches (120 cm) stroke. The engine was built by Rankin & Blackmore Ltd, Greenock.

== History ==
Empire Dew was built for the MoWT. Launched on 21 November 1940, she was completed in January 1941. She was placed under the management of R Chapman & Son Ltd, Newcastle-upon-Tyne. The Official Number 166993 and Code Letters GPFM were allocated. Her port of registry was Greenock.

Empire Dew departed from the Clyde on her maiden voyage on 2 February 1941 as a member of Convoy OB 281, which departed from Liverpool, Lancashire on 1 February and dispersed at sea on 5 February. Her destination was Halifax, Nova Scotia, Canada, where she arrived on 24 February. From Halifax, a return trip was made to Saint John, New Brunswick, arriving back at Halifax on 10 March. Empire Dew was a member of Convoy SC 26, which departed from Halifax on 20 March and arrived at Liverpool on 8 April. She was carrying a cargo of flour destined for Leith, East Lothian. She left the convoy at the Clyde on 8 April. Empire Dew was a member of Convoy WN 114, which departed from the Clyde on 13 April and arrived at Methil, Fife on 16 April. She departed from Methil on 28 April as a member of Convoy FS 475, which arrived at Southend, Essex on 30 April.

Empire Dew was a member of Convoy EC 27, which departed from Southend on 31 May and arrived at the Clyde on 6 June. She left the convoy at Oban, Argyllshire on 5 June, to join Convoy OG 64, which departed from Liverpool on 4 June and arrived at Gibraltar on 18 June. She detached from the convoy and headed for Father Point, New Brunswick, Canada. Her intended destination was Montreal.

At 02:51 (German time) on 12 June, Empire Dew was torpedoed when north of the Azores, Portugal (51°09′N 30°16′W) by U-48, under the command of Herbert Schultze. 23 crew members died. Seventeen crew and two DEMS gunners were rescued by HNoMS St. Albans. They were landed at Liverpool. Those killed serving on Empire Dew are commemorated on the Tower Hill Memorial, London.
