= German submarine U-2511 =

German World War II submarine

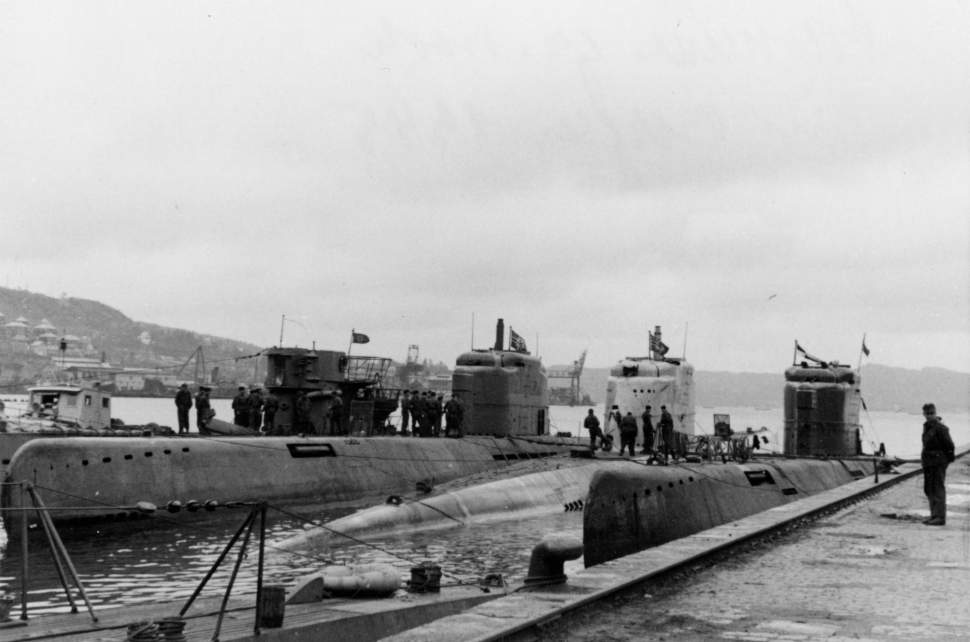
- U-2511 (center) in Bergen, Norway

History

Nazi Germany
- Name: U-2511
- Ordered: 6 November 1943
- Builder: Blohm & Voss, Hamburg
- Yard number: 2511
- Laid down: 7 July 1944
- Launched: 2 September 1944
- Commissioned: 29 September 1944
- Fate: Surrendered on 9 May 1945 at Bergen; Sunk in Operation Deadlight on 7 January 1946 at 7:40 pm

General characteristics
- Class & type: Type XXI submarine
- Displacement: 1,621 t (1,595 long tons) surfaced; 2,100 t (2,067 long tons) submerged
- Length: 76.70 m (251 ft 8 in) (o/a)
- Beam: 8 m (26 ft 3 in)
- Height: 11.30 m (37 ft 1 in)
- Draught: 6.32 m (20 ft 9 in)
- Propulsion: Diesel/Electric; 2 × MAN M6V40/46KBB supercharged 6-cylinder diesel engines, 4,000 PS (2,900 kW; 3,900 shp); 2 × SSW GU365/30 double-acting electric motors, 5,000 PS (3,700 kW; 4,900 shp); 2 × SSW GV232/28 silent running electric motors, 226 PS (166 kW; 223 shp)
- Speed: Surfaced: 15.6 knots (28.9 km/h; 18.0 mph) (diesel); 17.9 knots (33.2 km/h; 20.6 mph) (electric); Submerged: 17.2 knots (31.9 km/h; 19.8 mph) (electric); 6.1 knots (11.3 km/h; 7.0 mph) (silent running motors)
- Range: 15,500 nmi (28,700 km; 17,800 mi) at 10 knots (19 km/h; 12 mph) surfaced; 340 nmi (630 km; 390 mi) at 5 knots (9.3 km/h; 5.8 mph) submerged
- Test depth: 240 m (790 ft)
- Complement: 5 officers, 52 enlisted
- Sensors & processing systems: Type F432 D2 Radar Transmitter; FuMB Ant 3 Bali Radar Detector
- Armament: 6 × bow torpedo tubes; 23 × 53.3 cm (21 in) torpedoes; or 17 × torpedoes and 12 × mines; 4 × 2 cm (0.79 in) C/30 AA guns

Service record
- Part of: 31st U-boat Flotilla; 29 September 1944 – 14 March 1945; 11th U-boat Flotilla; 15 March – 8 May 1945
- Identification codes: M 45 912
- Commanders: Kptlt. / K.Kapt. Adalbert Schnee; 29 September 1944 – 9 May 1945
- Operations: 1 patrol: 3 – 6 May 1945
- Victories: None

German submarine U-2511 was a Type XXI submarine of Nazi Germany's Kriegsmarine during World War II. The Elektroboot submarine was laid down on 7 July 1944 at the Blohm & Voss yard at Hamburg, launched on 2 September 1944, and commissioned on 29 September 1944 under the command of Kapitänleutnant Adalbert Schnee.

== Design ==
Like all Type XXI submarines, U-2511 had a displacement of 1,621 tonnes (1,595 long tons) when at the surface and 1,819 tonnes (1,790 long tons) while submerged. She had a total length of 76.70 m (251 ft 8 in) (o/a), a beam of 8 m (26 ft 3 in), and a draught of 6.32 m (20 ft 9 in). The submarine was powered by two MAN SE supercharged six-cylinder M6V40/46KBB diesel engines each providing 4,000 metric horsepower (2,900 kilowatts; 3,900 shaft horsepower), two Siemens-Schuckert GU365/30 double-acting electric motors each providing 5,000 PS (3,700 kW; 4,900 shp), and two Siemens-Schuckert silent running GV232/28 electric motors each providing 226 PS (166 kW; 223 shp).

The submarine had a maximum surface speed of 15.6 knots (28.9 km/h; 18.0 mph) and a submerged speed of 17.2 knots (31.9 km/h; 19.8 mph). When running on silent motors the boat could operate at a speed of 6.1 knots (11.3 km/h; 7.0 mph). When submerged, the boat could operate at 5 knots (9.3 km/h; 5.8 mph) for 340 nautical miles (630 km; 390 mi); when surfaced, she could travel 15,500 nautical miles (28,700 km; 17,800 mi) at 10 knots (19 km/h; 12 mph). U-2511 was fitted with six 53.3 cm (21.0 in) torpedo tubes in the bow and four 2 cm (0.79 in) C/30 anti-aircraft guns. She could carry 23 torpedoes or 17 torpedoes and 12 naval mine. The complement was five officers and 52 men.

== Service history ==
After training with 31st U-boat Flotilla, U-2511 was transferred to 11th U-boat Flotilla at Bergen, Norway, for front-line service on 15 March 1945.

U-2511 conducted one patrol. On the evening of 30 April 1945 (coincidentally the date of Hitler's death), U-2511 set out from Bergen, Norway for the Caribbean, but on 4 May Schnee received the end-of-the-war cease-fire order. The commander of U-2511 claimed the U-boat had the British cruiser HMS Norfolk in her sights on 4 May when news of the German cease-fire was received. He further claimed she made a practice attack before leaving the scene undetected.

== Fate ==
On 17 June 1945, U-2511 was transferred from Bergen, and arrived at Londonderry Port on 21 June for Operation Deadlight. The U-boat was sunk on 7 January 1946 at 7:40 pm in position 55°33′N 07°38′W. She was sunk by gunfire after her towing cable parted.

The wreck lies at a depth 69 metres (226 ft). She had been visited by divers at least three times, in 1999 and 2001, and circa 2012 for 'Dig WW2 with Dan Snow', revealing she is largely intact except for a large blast hole caused by the shellfire that sank her.

== Bibliography ==
- Busch, Rainer; Röll, Hans-Joachim (1999). German U-boat commanders of World War II: a biographical dictionary. Translated by Brooks, Geoffrey. London, Annapolis, Md: Greenhill Books, Naval Institute Press. ISBN 1-55750-186-6.
- Busch, Rainer; Röll, Hans-Joachim (1999). Der U-Boot-Krieg, 1939-1945: Deutsche U-Boot-Verluste von September 1939 bis Mai 1945 [German U-boat losses from September 1939 to May 1945] (in German). Vol. IV. Hamburg, Berlin, Bonn: Mittler. ISBN 3-8132-0514-2.
- Gröner, Erich; Jung, Dieter; Maass, Martin (1991). U-boats and Mine Warfare Vessels. German Warships 1815–1945. Vol. 2. Translated by Thomas, Keith; Magowan, Rachel. London: Conway Maritime Press. ISBN 0-85177-593-4.
- Bekker, Cajus (1953). Kampf und Untergang der Kriegsmarine. Düsseldorf.
- Heinz Schaeffer. U-977.
