= USS Ringgold (DD-500) =

Fletcher-class destroyer

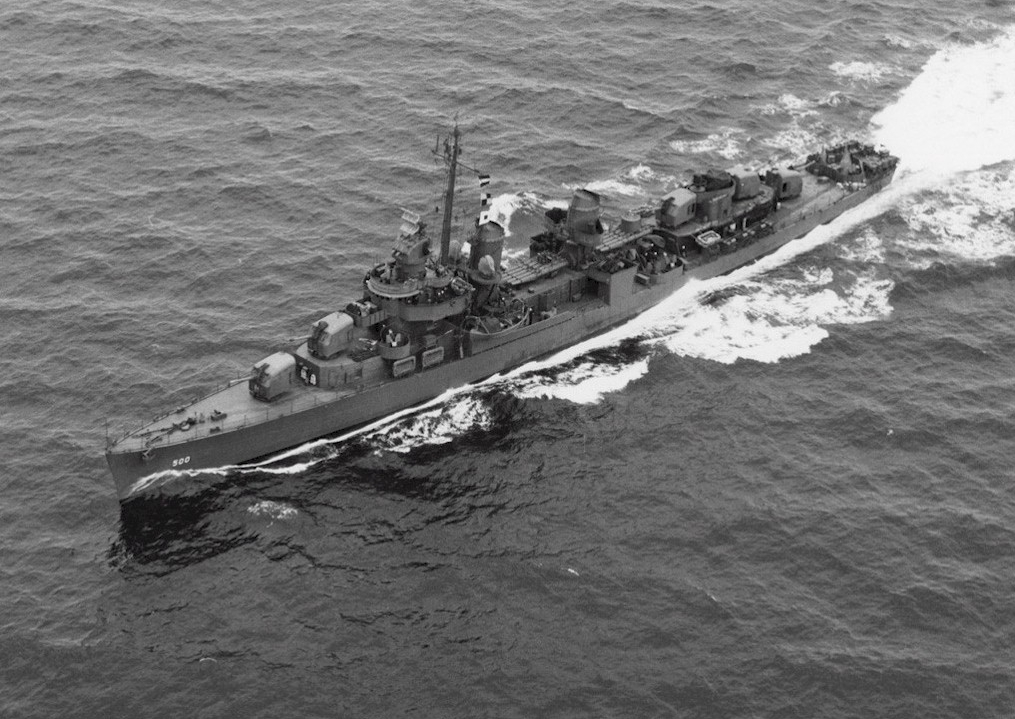

History

United States
- Name: USS Ringgold
- Namesake: Cadwalader Ringgold
- Builder: Federal Shipbuilding and Drydock Company, Kearny, New Jersey
- Laid down: 25 June 1942
- Launched: 11 November 1942
- Sponsored by: Mrs. Arunah Sheperdson Abell
- Commissioned: 30 December 1942
- Decommissioned: 23 March 1946
- Stricken: 1 October 1974
- Identification: DD-500
- Fate: Transferred to West German Navy, 14 July 1959

West Germany
- Name: Zerstörer 2
- Acquired: 14 July 1959
- Identification: D171
- Fate: Transferred to Hellenic Navy, 18 September 1981

Greece
- Name: Kimon
- Acquired: 18 September 1981
- Stricken: 1993
- Identification: D42
- Fate: Scrapped, 1993

General characteristics
- Class & type: Fletcher-class destroyer; Zerstörer 1-class destroyer
- Displacement: 2,050 long tons (2,080 t)
- Length: 376 ft 6 in (114.76 m)
- Beam: 39 ft 8 in (12.09 m)
- Draft: 17 ft 9 in (5.41 m)
- Propulsion: 60,000 shp (45 MW) ; 2 propellers
- Speed: 35 knots (65 km/h; 40 mph)
- Range: 6,500 nmi (12,000 km; 7,500 mi) at 15 knots (28 km/h; 17 mph)
- Complement: 329
- Armament: 5 × single Mk 12 5 in (127 mm)/38 guns; 5 × twin 40 mm (1.6 in) Bofors AA guns; 7 × single 20 mm (0.8 in) Oerlikon AA guns; 2 × quintuple 21 in (533 mm) torpedo tubes; 6 × single depth charge throwers; 2 × depth charge racks

USS Ringgold (DD-500), a Fletcher-class destroyer, was the second ship of the United States Navy to be named for Rear Admiral Cadwalader Ringgold (1802–1867). Entering service in 1942 during World War II, the destroyer served in the Pacific theater. Following the war the ship was placed in reserve before being transferred to the West German Navy and renamed Zerstörer 2 in 1959. In 1981 the destroyer was transferred to the Hellenic Navy and was renamed Kimon. Kimon was sold for scrap in 1993.

== Construction and career ==
Ringgold was laid down on 25 June 1942 by the Federal Shipbuilding & Dry Dock Co., Kearny, New Jersey. The ship was launched on 11 November 1942, sponsored by Mrs. Arunah Sheperdson Abell, grand niece of Rear Adm. Cadwallader Ringgold. Ringgold was commissioned on 30 December 1942.

Shakedown, which took Ringgold from the Brooklyn Navy Yard to Guantanamo Bay, Cuba, and back, extended through 18 February 1943. Additional training maneuvers kept her operating in the vicinity of Trinidad until mid-July. Departing New York en route to the Pacific 21 July, she transited the Panama Canal on 27 July and reported to Commander-in-Chief, Pacific Fleet, at Pearl Harbor, where she hoisted the pennant of Commander, Destroyer Division 50.

=== Gilbert Islands campaign, September – November 1943 ===
After several weeks of training, Ringgold joined a fast carrier task force built around Yorktown, Essex, and Independence. The force worked over Marcus Island 1 September 1943 and then moved on to conduct a raid in the Gilberts. The carrier planes conducted seven strikes 18–19 September on Tarawa and Makin. A Japanese diarist recorded that Tarawa "is a sea of flames"; nine parked planes and five vessels were destroyed. Most importantly, planes from Lexington returned with a set of low oblique photos of the lagoon side of Betio, and these proved to be most useful in planning the assault on Tarawa.

On 5–6 October, the largest fast carrier force organized to that time, comprising Essex, Yorktown, Lexington, Independence, Cowpens, and Belleau Wood, Rear Adm. Alfred E. Montgomery in command, struck at Wake Island. The target was also shelled by battleships, cruisers, and destroyers.

The next target was Tarawa, taken by the Southern Attack Force commanded by Rear Adm. Harry W. Hill in the battleship Maryland. His ships transported the tough 2d Marine Division, all of whose components had fought on Guadalcanal. Destroyers Ringgold and Dashiell were scheduled for an early entrance into the lagoon 20 November. Just before sundown on 19 November, Ringgold thrust ahead of the main body of the attack force to secure a radar fix on a turning point just north of Mavana.

Charts of the area, however, were inaccurate. On several, Betio was oriented incorrectly. The submarine Nautilus reconnoitered the area and reported the error, and thus a new approach chart was improvised on board Maryland. Accurate radar fixes were thus possible.

At 22:00, as Ringgold and the cruiser Santa Fe pushed ahead of the attack force, they picked up a radar contact. Word had been passed to watch for the submarine, but it was believed that she had moved westward that afternoon to rescue a downed flier, and that she would submerge once she encountered friendly forces. However, Nautilus being near a reef, did not submerge. Admiral Hill, anxious to avoid any encounters with possible Japanese patrols, gave the order to take the contact under fire. Ringgold's first salvo struck the base of the sub's conning tower. Although it ruptured her main induction valve, it did not explode. Nautilus submerged in "dire circumstances", but was able to make it to Abemama and complete her mission.

Shortly after 05:00 counterbattery fire commenced, and at 06:22 came the scheduled naval bombardment, which resulted in a systematic going-over for Betio. Minesweepers Pursuit and Requisite, under cover of a smoke screen, swept a channel from the transport area into the lagoon during the bombardment, and they used their own guns to bark replies to Japanese shore batteries.

Then, while Pursuit placed marked buoys, Requisite led both Ringgold and Dashiell into the lagoon. They sped into the lagoon while under fire from shore batteries. Ringgold took two hits, both duds, although one managed to knock out her port engine. Her Chief Engineer, Lt. Comdr. Wayne A. Parker, is said to have imitated the legendary Dutch boy by plugging a hole with his body while emergency repairs were made.

Larger craft could not yet venture into the lagoon, and the four ships provided all the frontal fire that the beach defenses received, with additional ammunition being lightered in to them before the day ended. Of the 5,000 men ashore by the end of the-day, nearly 1,500 had been killed or wounded. Ringgold and Dashiell were eventually relieved by the destroyers Frazier and Anderson. They provided close on-call gunfire support, while carrier aircraft bombed and strafed Japanese positions almost continuously until sunset. However, the "air support provided at Tarawa was slight in strength and elementary in technique compared with what was done 18 months later at Okinawa."

As the sun set, all combatants—except three destroyers—and transports withdrew to offshore areas for protection against air and submarine attack. The transports returned at 21:40. Ringgold anchored inside the lagoon, Anderson cruised the southern shore, and Frazier was off the butt end of the island to provide call fire through the night. By 27 November 1943, both Tarawa and Abemama were secured.

=== 1944 ===
After completing repairs in December, Ringgold took part in the assault and capture of Kwajalein and of Eniwetok Atolls during January and February 1944, where she furnished close-in fire support for the landing forces. On 20 March she bombarded the shore installations at Kavieng, New Ireland, as a diversionary action for landings in the Northern Bismarck Archipelago. From 24 April until 1 May 1944, she took part in the assault and capture of Hollandia, Dutch New Guinea.

In June Ringgold took part in the Marianas operations. During the invasion of Guam she served as Landing Craft Control Vessel and provided gunfire support. During the initial landing, she dispatched 23 waves of landing craft to the beach. Next came the invasion of Morotai Island, in the Northern Moluccas, where Ringgold again provided gunfire support.

On 20 October 1944, American forces returned to the Philippines, and Ringgold again furnished fire support, this time for the landings on Panaon Island off southern Leyte. Two days later, she was ordered to Mare Island Naval Shipyard, California, for overhaul.

=== 1945 ===
Early in February 1945, Ringgold joined Vice Admiral Marc Mitscher's famed Fast Carrier Task Force (then 5th Fleet's TF 58, later 3rd Fleet's TF 38) for the first carrier strikes against the Japanese mainland and Okinawa in support of the Iwo Jima operation. Under cover of a weather front, the force launched its air groups at dawn, 16 February, 120 miles (190 km) from target. Attacks against enemy air power were pressed into the heart of the Japanese homeland far into the next day. In the course of this 2-day attack, the Japanese lost 416 planes in the air, 354 more on the ground and one escort carrier.

After repairs at Ulithi and Pearl Harbor, Ringgold rejoined TF 58 in support of the Okinawa operation, joining up 4 June 1945. Upon completion of this task, the force retired to San Pedro Bay, Leyte Gulf, the Philippines, arriving 13 June.

On 1 July the ship again put to sea, this time with Admiral William Halsey's 3d Fleet Fast Carrier Task Force for strikes against the Japanese homeland. On the night of 15–16 July, with Destroyer Squadron 25 (DesRon 25) and Cruiser Division 17 (CruDiv 17), Ringgold participated in an antishipping sweep 6 miles (9.7 km) off the northern coast of Honshū, Japan. Again, on the night of 30 July, she participated in an antishipping sweep in Suruga Wan and bombarded the town of Shimizu, Honshū, Japan.

Rejoining TF 38 on 31 July, Ringgold continued coastal operations with that force until the cease fire. Ordered to escort the aircraft carrier Antietam to Apra Harbor, Guam, 22 August, she arrived there four days later and underwent repairs. Steaming to Okinawa on 16 September, Ringgold took on 83 passengers for Pearl Harbor, and then proceeded to the east coast of the United States. Decommissioning 23 March 1946, she was placed in the Atlantic Reserve Fleet at Charleston, South Carolina, where she remained into 1959. Designated for transfer to the Federal Republic of Germany under the military assistance program, she underwent modernization and outfitting at the Charleston Naval Shipyard.

=== West German Navy ===
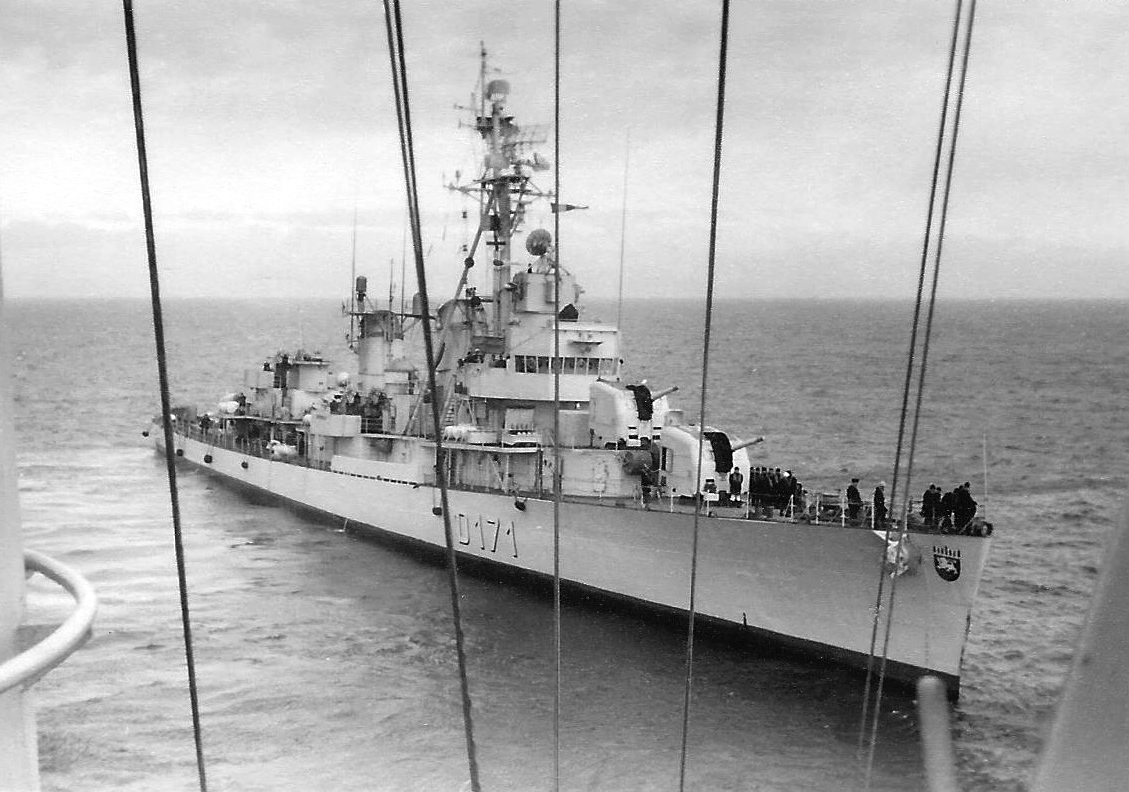
Ringgold in German service as Zerstörer 2 (D171), 1971.

Formally transferred to the Bundesmarine on 14 July 1959, she was redesignated Zerstörer 2 (D171). Three former Knight's Cross of the Iron Cross recipients of the Kriegsmarine commanded Zerstörer 2 during her career with the Bundesmarine. Fregattenkapitän Günter Kuhnke from 14 July 1959 until November 1960, Fregattenkapitän Otto Ites from November 1960 until September 1962 and Fregattenkapitän Paul Brasack from September 1962 until March 1964.

The ship was transferred to Greece in 1981.

=== Hellenic Navy ===
The ship was transferred to the Hellenic Navy on 18 September 1981, and renamed Kimon (D42).

Kimon was placed in reserve in 1987. She was stricken and broken up for scrap in 1993.

== Awards ==
Ringgold received 10 battle stars for World War II service.
