= Adalbert Schnee =

German WWII U-boat commander (1913–1982)

- Born: 31 December 1913; Berlin
- Died: 4 November 1982 (aged 68); Hamburg
- Military career
- Allegiance: Nazi Germany
- Branch: Kriegsmarine
- Service years: 1934–45
- Rank: Korvettenkapitän
- Nickname: Adi
- Commands: U-6; U-60; U-121; U-201; U-2511
- Conflicts: World War II: Operation Weserübung; Battle of the Atlantic (1939-1945)
- Awards: Knight's Cross of the Iron Cross with Oak Leaves

Otto Adalbert Schnee (31 December 1913 – 4 November 1982) was a Korvettenkapitän (corvette captain) with Nazi Germany's Kriegsmarine during World War II. He commanded the submarines U-6, U-60, U-121, U-201 and U-2511, sinking twenty-one merchant ships on twelve patrols, for a total of 90,847 gross register tons (GRT) of Allied shipping, and received the Knight's Cross with Oak Leaves.

== Career ==
Schnee was a member of Hitler's Nazi party. He joined the Reichsmarine in April 1934. After serving aboard the light cruiser Leipzig, he transferred to the U-boat arm in May 1937. He spent two years on board the Type IIB U-boat U-23, under the command of Oberleutnant zur See Otto Kretschmer, completing five combat patrols as 1.WO (second-in-command), between October 1939 and January 1940.

Schnee's first command, from January to July 1940, was the Type IIA submarine U-6, in which he sailed on only a single short patrol in April supporting "Operation Weserübung" (the invasion of Norway).

His next command, between July and October 1940, was the Type IIC U-boat U-60. In her he sailed on three more patrols around the coasts of the British Isles sinking two ships for a total of 3,188 tons, and damaging one of 15,434 tons.

Schnee commanded the Type IIB training boat U-121 during November 1940, but as this class of submarine were withdrawn from front-line service, in January 1941 Schnee was given command of the newer, larger Type VIIC U-boat U-201.

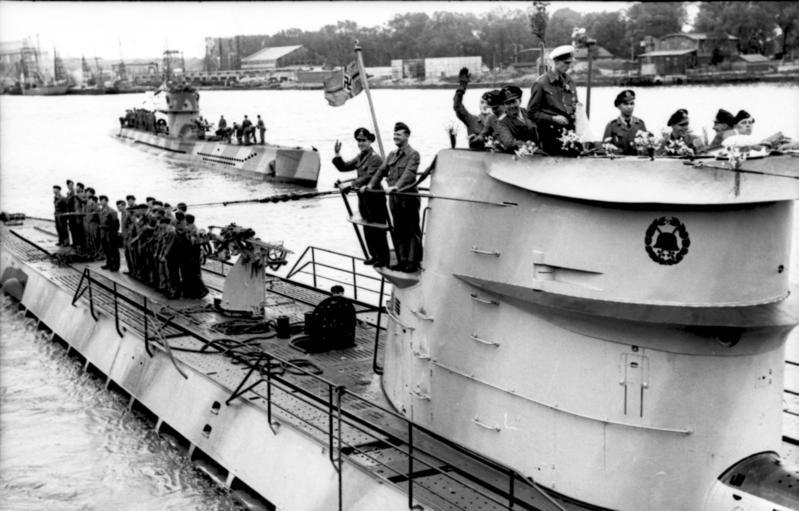
Adalbert Schnee on the conning tower of U-201 in the background as it leaves Lorient on 8 June 1941 for its 2nd war patrol. In the foreground is U-123.

Schnee sailed on seven combat patrols in U-201 between April 1941 and August 1942, sinking 19 merchant ships (totalling 87,001 tons) and damaged two others (13,386 tons). He also sank two British Royal Navy auxiliary warships, the fighter catapult ship HMS Springbank and the anti-submarine naval trawler HMS Laertes. In August 1941 he was awarded the Knight's Cross of the Iron Cross, and in July 1942 with the Oak Leaves.

In October 1942 Schnee joined the BdU staff. In his position as the Geleitzugs-Admiralstabsoffizier, he planned and organized operations against Allied convoys.

In September 1944 Schnee took command of the new Elektroboot U-2511, one of only two Type XXI U-boats to go on patrol (U-3008 being the other). U-2511's first and only patrol began on 3 May 1945 at Bergen. The next day Schnee received the cease-fire order, prior to the German surrender, and a few hours later spotted a group of British warships. Simulating an attack, he evaded the destroyer screen, closed to within 500 metres (1,600 ft) of the British cruiser Norfolk, and then left the area without being detected. U-2511 returned to Bergen on 5 May to surrender as ordered. Schnee spoke to officers from Norfolk a few days later, who could not believe that U-2511 was able to get so close without any sonar contact. Schnee is said to have requested a comparison of the respective ships' logs, which confirmed his account. His Leitender Ingenieur (chief engineer) on this patrol was Gerd Suhren.

== Post-war ==
After the war Schnee was not tried for his Nazi activities. He served for six months in the German Mine Sweeping Administration. In October 1945 he was called to testify at the trial of Heinz-Wilhelm Eck and the officers of U-852, for their actions after the sinking of SS Peleus. Although appearing for the defence, Schnee was forced to admit he would not have acted as Eck did. He then worked for some years as a commercial representative before becoming the director of a sailing school on Elba. He was also for many years the chairman of the Verband Deutscher Ubootfahrer (association of German submarine crews). In 1980 Schnee published an article in the official VDU periodical defending the German festivities following the funeral of Admiral Dönitz, which had been severely criticized, and in which not only war veterans but also members of German Neo-Nazi associations had taken part. He said that the German song Deutschland, Deutschland über alles (Germany, Germany above everything) had been “spontaneously sung by the crowd, including the first verse” and had been “the most beautiful farewell present for the deceased man.” Schnee died in 1982.

== Awards ==
- Wehrmacht Long Service Award (8 April 1938)
- Iron Cross (1939)
  - 2nd Class (21 October 1939)
  - 1st Class (15 August 1940)
- Sudetenland Medal (20 December 1939)
- U-boat War Badge (1939) (27 November 1939)
- Knight's Cross of the Iron Cross with Oak Leaves
  - Knight's Cross on 30 August 1941 as Oberleutnant zur See and commander of U-201
  - 105th Oak Leaves on 15 July 1942 as Kapitänleutnant and commander of U-201

Military offices
Preceded by Kapitänleutnant Otto Harms	Commanding officer, U-6; 18/31 January 1940 – 10 July 1940	Succeeded by Kapitänleutnant Georg Peters
Preceded by Kapitänleutnant Georg Schewe	Commanding officer, U-60; 19 July 1940 – 5 November 1940	Succeeded by Kapitänleutnant Georg Wallas
Preceded by Kapitänleutnant Otto Harms	Commanding officer, U-121; 6 November 1940 – 27 November 1940	Succeeded by Kapitänleutnant Egon-Reiner Freiherr von Schlippenbach
First	Commanding officer, U-201; 25 January 1941 – 24 August 1942	Succeeded by Kapitänleutnant Günter Rosenberg
First	Commanding officer, U-2511; 29 September 1944 – 8 May 1945	surrendered
