= German submarine U-48 (1939) =

German World War II submarine

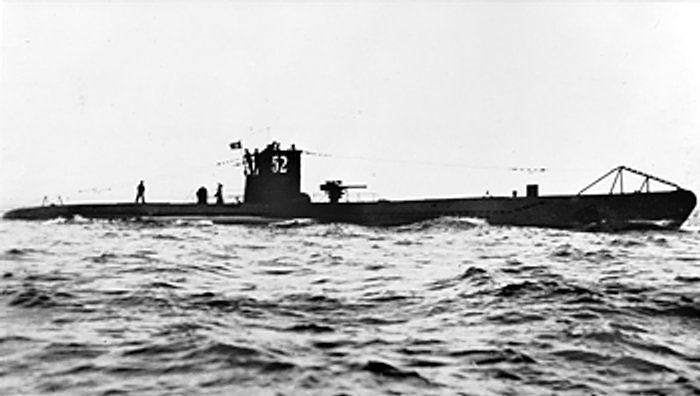
- U-52, a typical Type VIIB boat

History

Nazi Germany
- Name: U-48
- Ordered: 21 November 1936
- Builder: Germaniawerft, Kiel
- Cost: 4,439,000 Reichsmark
- Yard number: 583
- Laid down: 10 March 1937
- Launched: 8 March 1939
- Commissioned: 22 April 1939
- Decommissioned: October 1943
- Fate: Scuttled, 3 May 1945

General characteristics
- Class & type: Type VIIB U-boat
- Displacement: 753 t (741 long tons) surfaced; 857 t (843 long tons) submerged
- Length: 66.50 m (218 ft 2 in) o/a; 48.80 m (160 ft 1 in) pressure hull
- Beam: 6.20 m (20 ft 4 in) o/a; 4.70 m (15 ft 5 in) pressure hull
- Draught: 4.74 m (15 ft 7 in)
- Installed power: 2,800–3,200 PS (2,100–2,400 kW; 2,800–3,200 bhp) (diesels); 750 PS (550 kW; 740 shp) (electric)
- Propulsion: 2 shafts; 2 × diesel engines; 2 × electric motors
- Speed: 17.9 knots (33.2 km/h; 20.6 mph) surfaced; 8 knots (15 km/h; 9.2 mph) submerged
- Range: 8,700 nmi (16,112 km; 10,012 mi) at 10 knots (19 km/h; 12 mph) surfaced; 90 nmi (170 km; 100 mi) at 4 knots (7.4 km/h; 4.6 mph) submerged
- Test depth: 230 m (750 ft). Calculated crush depth: 250–295 m (820–968 ft)
- Complement: 4 officers, 40–56 enlisted
- Sensors & processing systems: Gruppenhorchgerät
- Armament: 5 × 53.3 cm (21 in) torpedo tubes (four bow, one stern); 14 torpedoes or 26 TMA or 39 TMB mines; 1 × 8.8 cm SK C/35 naval gun with 220 rounds; 1 × 2 cm (0.79 in) C/30 anti-aircraft gun

Service record
- Part of: 7th U-boat Flotilla; 22 April 1939 – 30 June 1941; 26th U-boat Flotilla; 1 July 1941 – 31 March 1942; 21st U-boat Flotilla; 1 April 1942 – 31 October 1943
- Identification codes: M 27 354
- Commanders: Oblt.z.S. / Kptlt. Herbert Schultze; 22 April 1939 – 20 May 1940; K.Kapt. Hans-Rudolf Rösing; 21 May – 3 September 1940; Kptlt. Heinrich Bleichrodt; 4 September – 16 December 1940; Kptlt. Herbert Schultze; 17 December – 27 July 1941; Oblt.z.S. Siegfried Atzinger; August 1941 – September 1942; Oblt.z.S. Diether Todenhagen; 26 September – October 1943
- Operations: 12 patrols: 1st patrol: 19 August – 17 September 1939; 2nd patrol: 4 – 25 October 1939; 3rd patrol: 20 November – 20 December 1939; 4th patrol: 24 January – 26 February 1940; 5th patrol: 3 – 20 April 1940; 6th patrol: 26 May – 29 June 1940; 7th patrol: 7 – 28 August 1940; 8th patrol: 8 – 25 September 1940; 9th patrol: 5 – 27 October 1940; 10th patrol: 20 January – 27 February 1941; 11th patrol: 17 March – 8 April 1941; 12th patrol: a. 22 May – 17 June 1941; b. 19 – 21 June 1941
- Victories: 51 merchant ships sunk (306,874 GRT); 1 warship sunk (1,060 tons); 3 merchant ships damaged (20,480 GRT)

German submarine U-48 was a Type VIIB U-boat of Nazi Germany's Kriegsmarine during World War II, and the most successful that was commissioned. During her two years of active service, U-48 sank 52 ships for a total of 306,874 GRT and 1,060 tons; she also damaged three more for a total of 20,480 GRT over twelve war patrols conducted during the opening stages of the Battle of the Atlantic.

U-48 was built at the Germaniawerft in Kiel as yard number 583 during 1938 and 1939, being completed a few months before the outbreak of war in September 1939 and given to Kapitänleutnant (Kptlt.) Herbert Schultze. When war was declared, she was already in position in the North Atlantic, and received the news via radio, allowing her to operate immediately against Allied shipping.

== Design ==
German Type VIIB submarines were preceded by the shorter Type VIIA submarines. U-48 had a displacement of 753 tonnes (741 long tons) when at the surface and 857 tonnes (843 long tons) while submerged. She had a total length of 66.50 m (218 ft 2 in), a pressure hull length of 48.80 m (160 ft 1 in), a beam of 6.20 m (20 ft 4 in), a height of 9.50 m (31 ft 2 in), and a draught of 4.74 m (15 ft 7 in). The submarine was powered by two Germaniawerft F46 four-stroke, six-cylinder supercharged diesel engines producing a total of 2,800 to 3,200 metric horsepower (2,060 to 2,350 kW; 2,760 to 3,160 shp) for use while surfaced, two AEG GU 460/8-276 double-acting electric motors producing a total of 750 metric horsepower (550 kW; 740 shp) for use while submerged. She had two shafts and two 1.23 m (4 ft) propellers. The boat was capable of operating at depths of up to 230 metres (750 ft).

The submarine had a maximum surface speed of 17.9 knots (33.2 km/h; 20.6 mph) and a maximum submerged speed of 8 knots (15 km/h; 9.2 mph). When submerged, the boat could operate for 90 nautical miles (170 km; 100 mi) at 4 knots (7.4 km/h; 4.6 mph); when surfaced, she could travel 8,700 nautical miles (16,100 km; 10,000 mi) at 10 knots (19 km/h; 12 mph). U-48 was fitted with five 53.3 cm (21 in) torpedo tubes (four fitted at the bow and one at the stern), fourteen torpedoes, one 8.8 cm (3.46 in) SK C/35 naval gun, 220 rounds, and one 2 cm (0.79 in) C/30 anti-aircraft gun. The boat had a complement of between forty-four and sixty.

== Service history ==
U-48 was a member of two wolfpacks. Seven former members of the boat's crew earned the Knight's Cross of the Iron Cross during their military career: these were the commanders Herbert Schultze, Hans-Rudolf Rösing and Heinrich Bleichrodt, the first watch officer Reinhard Suhren, the second watch Otto Ites, the chief engineer Erich Zürn and the coxswain Horst Hofmann.

U-48 survived most of the war and was scuttled by her own crew on 3 May 1945 off Neustadt in order to keep the submarine out of the hands of the advancing allies.

=== First patrol (19 August – 17 September 1939) ===
U-48 left her home port of Kiel on 19 August 1939, before World War II began, for a period of 30 days. The submarine travelled north of the British Isles, into the North Atlantic and eventually into the Bay of Biscay. She then proceeded to cruise to the west of the Western Approaches, two days after Britain and France declared war on Germany. It was here that she spotted her first target, the 4,853 GRT SS Royal Sceptre. U-48 attacked the merchant ship with her deck gun on 5 September 1939. All of the crew took to the lifeboats except the Radio Officer who remained transmitting "SOS". He was taken prisoner by U-48, but then released to the lifeboats as Schultze praised his courage. He verified that the lifeboats were provisioned with food and water. U-48 then stopped the SS Browning. The crew abandoned their vessel, but Schultze told them to return to their ship and pick up the crew of Royal Sceptre. However Browning was en route to Brazil, so it was not immediately realised that they had survived. Winston Churchill, then First Lord of The Admiralty, assumed the worst, that the crew and sixty passengers were lost. He declared the sinking to be

an odious act of bestial piracy on the high seas

U-48 stopped, searched and released several neutral ships before encountering and sinking Winkleigh on 8 September 1939 after her crew had taken to the lifeboats. On 11 September U-48 sank Firby. Some of the crew required medical attention following the sinking. U-48 provisioned the lifeboats, gave medical assistance and radioed:

Transmit to Mr Churchill. I have sunk the British steamer Firby. Posit 59°40'N 13°50'W. Save the crew if you please. German submarine

Churchill, wrongly, told the House of Commons that the U-boat captain who had sent the message had been captured. After 30 days at sea, U-48 returned to Kiel on 17 September 1939. During her first war patrol, she sank three ships for a total of 14,777 GRT.

=== Second patrol (4–25 October 1939) ===
U-48's second patrol was even more successful. Having left Kiel on 4 October, she proceeded to follow the same course as her previous voyage. During her second patrol, U-48 sank a total of five enemy ships, including the large French tanker SS Emile Miguet on 12 October, Heronspool and Louisiane on 13 October, Sneaton on 14 October and Clan Chisholm on 17 October. Following the sinking of Clan Chisholm, U-48 attacked the British steamer Rockpool with fire from her deck gun on 19 October at 1:32 pm. However, the steamer returned fire. In order to avoid being hit, U-48 crash-dived. She subsequently re-surfaced and attempted to sink the steamer again when an Allied destroyer came upon the engagement. U-48 then broke off the fight with Rockpool and submerged once more to leave the area. Following the sinking of five enemy merchant ships for a total of 37,153 GRT as well as the engagement with Rockpool, U-48 returned to the safety of Kiel on 25 October 1939 after spending 22 days at sea.

=== Third patrol (20 November – 20 December 1939) ===
U-48 left Kiel for her third patrol on 20 November 1939. During this voyage, she sank a total of four vessels including two merchant ships from neutral nations. The first ship to fall victim to the U-boat was the 6,336 GRT neutral Swedish motor tanker MT Gustaf E. Reuter. She was attacked by U-48 on 27 November 14 nmi (26 km; 16 mi) west-northwest of Fair Isle. The wreck was later sunk by an escort vessel. One person died, 33 of her crew survived. The tug HMS St. Mellons attempted to salvage her, however Gustaf E. Reuter eventually had to be sent to the bottom by HMS Kingston Beryl on 28 November. Following the sinking of Gustaf E. Reuter, U-48 sank the British freighter Brandon on 8 December off the southern coast of Ireland. The next day, she sunk the British tanker San Alberto. Finally on 15 December 1939 U-48 stopped the neutral Greek freighter Germaine which had been chartered by Ireland and was also neutral, to carry maize to Cork. Schultze maintained that she was going to England, so he sank her. U-48 returned to Kiel on 20 December 1939 after sinking a total of 25,618 GRT and spent a total of 31 days at sea.

=== Fourth patrol (24 January – 26 February 1940) ===
After a break over the Christmas period, the boat put to sea again, sinking the British Blue Star Line liner SS Sultan Star in the Western Approaches. The vessel was only carrying freight. She laid a string of mines off St Abb's Head which failed to have any effect, but two neutral Dutch ships were added to her tally shortly afterwards, as well as a Finnish ship, all of them operating in the North Atlantic in cooperation with the Allied convoy system.

=== Fifth and sixth patrols (April 1940 and June 1940) ===
Her fifth patrol, in June 1940 was one of her most successful, making full use of the situation in Europe following the Fall of France. U-48 was commanded by Hans Rudolf Rösing, as Herbert Schultze was hospitalised with a kidney and stomach complaint. She attacked three ships off the County Donegal coast; Stancor carrying fish from Iceland, Eros carrying 200 tons of small arms from America and Frances Massey with iron ore. 34 sailors lost their lives on Frances Massey. The cargo on Eros was particularly important following the losses at Dunkirk. The badly damaged Eros was taken in tow by HMS Berkeley, assisted by HMS Bandit and Volunteer and headed to the Irish coast, where Muirchú and Fort Rannoch were waiting for them. Eros was beached on Errarooey strand. While she was being repaired, Irish troops guarded the site.

Germany learned that a troop convoy, including RMS Queen Mary and Mauretania were bringing 25,000 Australian soldiers to Britain. U-48 was ordered to Cape Finisterre where a U-boat 'wolfpack' was being assembled to intercept the convoy. However, the U-boats attacked other ships in the vicinity, alerting the convoy to their presence, so they altered direction, avoiding the 'wolfpack'. On 19 June 1940, Convoy HG 34 was attacked. U-48 sank SS Baron Loudoun (three died), SS British Monarch (all 40 on board died) and MV Tudor (one death). Convoy HX 49 dispersed; U-48 sank Moordrecht, which had been in that convoy; 25 died. Ireland had chartered neutral Greek ships; U-48 sank Violando N. Goulandris (six died) while U-28 sank Adamandios Georgandis (one death). Ireland sought an explanation from Germany "... steamships, the entire cargoes of which comprised grain for exclusive consumption in Éire were sunk by unidentified submarines ..."

U-48 was enjoying an extended patrol, thanks to the newly established refuelling facilities available at Trondheim in Norway. In all, she claimed eight ships from the convoys in the Eastern Atlantic on this cruise and bagged five more on her sixth patrol in August, which finished with her stationed at Lorient on the French Atlantic coast, greatly extending her raiding abilities.

=== Seventh and eighth patrols (August 1940 and September 1940) ===
The U-boat's seventh patrol was also successful, sinking five ships, including two from Convoy HX 65, and damaging a fifth (also from HX 65) which had to be scuttled. The operating zone for both this patrol and the next was far to the north of her previous areas, being south of Greenland.

In September, on her eighth patrol she shocked the world by sinking SS City of Benares, one of eight ships in six days from Convoys SC 3 and OB 213. On board the liner were 119 children, 90 of whom were being evacuated to Canada under the Children's Overseas Reception Board initiative. Heinrich Bleichrodt, the captain of U-48, was accused of war crimes in the sinking of City of Benares but was ultimately acquitted.

The sinking ship took on an immediate list, thus causing problems launching all but two of the lifeboats. As hundreds of survivors struggled in the water, the U-boat's powerful searchlight swept once over the chaotic scene before she left the area. The survivors in the boats were not rescued for nearly 24 hours. In that time dozens of children and adults died from exposure or drowned, leaving only 148 survivors (19 children, 21 women, and 108 men) out of 408 on board (119 children, 56 women, and 233 men). One boat was not recovered for a further eight days. In total, 260 people, including 100 children, 35 women, and 125 men, died in the disaster, which effectively ended the overseas evacuation programme.

The controversy of City of Benares disaster has been debated ever since. It has been suggested that had the British openly declared that the ship was carrying evacuees, then the Germans would have taken pains not to sink it, recognising the potential for a propaganda crisis, which indeed occurred. However, the ship was not only travelling unlit at night in an Allied convoy, but it was also the flagship of Rear-Admiral Edmund Mackinnon, the convoy commander. Other historians have argued that the Germans would have attacked any large liners at the time, no matter what cargo was being carried or who was on the passenger list. However, the Benares was painted like a troop ship, and the U-boat, believing that it was only carrying soldiers and crew, sank the ship. Among the other sinkings was the British sloop HMS Dundee.

=== Ninth to twelfth patrols (October 1940, February 1941, March 1941 and June 1941) ===
On her ninth and tenth patrols, U-48 claimed two and five victims respectively, but she was clearly becoming obsolete in the face of improving technology on both sides, despite a winter refit. Her range and torpedo capacity were too small for the widening nature of the sea war, and she would be a risk to her crew and other U-boats if she continued much longer in the main battlefield of the North Atlantic. On her final patrol she sank five more ships; the boat was boosted by the award of the Knight's Cross of the Iron Cross to Erich Zürn, the boat's executive officer, for his success and judgement during the ship's career.

=== Retirement and fate ===
U-48 returned to Kiel on 22 June 1941, where her crew disembarked and she was transferred to a training flotilla operating exclusively in the Baltic Sea. Unlike many of her contemporaries, U-48 never sailed on patrols against Soviet targets following Operation Barbarossa the following month. In 1943 she was deemed unfit even for this reduced service, being laid up at Neustadt in Holstein with only a skeleton crew performing minor maintenance. It was there that she remained for the next two years, until the maintenance crew, realising that the war was ending and the boat would be captured, scuttled her in the Bay of Lübeck on 3 May 1945, where she remains.

Locations of the 55 ships sunk and damaged by U-48 during her career

=== Wolfpacks ===
U-48 took part in two wolfpacks, namely:

- Rösing (12 – 15 June 1940)
- West (2 – 8 June 1941)

== Summary of raiding history ==
Date	Ship	Nationality	Tonnage (Note: Merchant ship tonnages are in gross register tons. Military vessels are listed by tons displacement.)	Fate	Location
5 September 1939	Royal Sceptre	United Kingdom	4,853	Sunk	46°23′N 14°59′W
8 September 1939	Winkleigh	United Kingdom	5,055	Sunk	48°06′N 18°12′W
11 September 1939	Firby	Canada	4,869	Sunk	59°40′N 13°50′W
12 October 1939	Emile Miguet	France	14,115	Sunk	50°15′N 14°50′W
12 October 1939	Heronspool	United Kingdom	5,202	Sunk	50°13′N 14°48′W
13 October 1939	Louisiane	France	6,903	Sunk	50°14′N 15°20′W
14 October 1939	Sneaton	United Kingdom	3,677	Sunk	49°05′N 13°05′W
17 October 1939	Clan Chisholm	United Kingdom	7,256	Sunk	44°57′N 13°40′W
26 November 1939	Gustaf E. Reuter	Sweden	6,336	Sunk	59°38′N 02°03′W
8 December 1939	Brandon	United Kingdom	6,668	Sunk	50°28′N 08°28′W
9 December 1939	San Alberto	United Kingdom	7,397	Sunk	49°20′N 09°45′W
15 December 1939	Germaine	Greece	5,217	Sunk	51°00′N 12°18′W
10 February 1940	Burgerdijk	Netherlands	6,853	Sunk	49°45′N 06°30′W
14 February 1940	Sultan Star	United Kingdom	12,306	Sunk	48°54′N 10°03′W
15 February 1940	Den Haag	Netherlands	8,971	Sunk	48°02′N 08°26′W
17 February 1940	Wilja	Finland	3,396	Sunk	49°00′N 06°33′W
6 June 1940	Stancor	United Kingdom	798	Sunk	58°48′N 08°45′W
6 June 1940	Frances Massey	United Kingdom	4,212	Sunk	55°33′N 08°26′W
7 June 1940	Eros	United Kingdom	5,888	Damaged	55°33′N 08°26′W
11 June 1940	Violando N Goulandris	Greece	3,598	Sunk	44°04′N 12°30′W
19 June 1940	Tudor	Norway	6,607	Sunk	45°10′N 11°50′W
19 June 1940	Baron Loudoun	United Kingdom	3,164	Sunk	45°00′N 11°21′W
19 June 1940	British Monarch	United Kingdom	5,661	Sunk	45°00′N 11°21′W
20 June 1940	Moordrecht	Netherlands	7,493	Sunk	43°34′N 14°20′W
16 August 1940	Hedrun	Sweden	2,325	Sunk	57°10′N 16°37′W
19 August 1940	Ville de Gand	Belgium	7,590	Sunk	55°28′N 15°10′W
24 August 1940	La Brea	United Kingdom	6,665	Sunk	57°24′N 11°21′W
25 August 1940	Empire Merlin	United Kingdom	5,763	Sunk	58°30′N 10°15′W
25 August 1940	Athelcrest	United Kingdom	6,825	Sunk	58°24′N 11°25′W
15 September 1940	Alexandros	Greece	4,343	Sunk	56°30′N 16°30′W
15 September 1940	HMS Dundee	Royal Navy	1,060	Sunk	56°45′N 14°14′W
15 September 1940	Empire Volunteer	United Kingdom	5,319	Sunk	56°43′N 15°17′W
17 / 18 September 1940	City of Benares	United Kingdom	11,081	Sunk	56°43′N 21°15′W
17 / 18 September 1940	Marina	United Kingdom	5,088	Sunk	56°46′N 21°15′W
18 September 1940	Magdalena	United Kingdom	3,118	Sunk	57°20′N 20°16′W
21 September 1940	Blairangus	United Kingdom	4,409	Sunk	55°18′N 22°21′W
21 September 1940	Broompark	United Kingdom	5,136	Damaged	49°02′N 40°26′W
11 October 1940	Brandanger	Norway	4,624	Sunk	57°10′N 17°42′W
11 October 1940	Port Gisborne	United Kingdom	8,390	Sunk	56°38′N 16°40′W
12 October 1940	Davanger	Norway	7,102	Sunk	57°00′N 19°10′W
17 October 1940	Languedoc	United Kingdom	9,512	Sunk	59°14′N 17°51′W
17 October 1940	Scoresby	United Kingdom	3,843	Sunk	59°14′N 17°51′W
18 October 1940	Sandend	United Kingdom	3,612	Sunk	58°12′N 21°29′W
20 October 1940	Shirak	United Kingdom	6,023	Sunk	57°00′N 16°53′W
1 February 1941	Nicolaos Angelos	Greece	4,351	Sunk	59°00′N 17°00′W
24 February 1941	Nailsea Lass	United Kingdom	4,289	Sunk	50°06′N 10°23′W
29 March 1941	Germanic	United Kingdom	5,352	Sunk	61°18′N 22°05′W
29 March 1941	Limbourg	Belgium	2,483	Sunk	61°18′N 22°05′W
29 March 1941	Hylton	United Kingdom	5,197	Sunk	60°20′N 18°10′W
2 April 1941	Beaverdale	United Kingdom	9,957	Sunk	60°50′N 29°19′W
3 June 1941	Inversuir	United Kingdom	9,456	Damaged	48°30′N 28°30′W
5 June 1941	Wellfield	United Kingdom	6,054	Sunk	48°34′N 31°34′W
6 June 1941	Tregarthen	United Kingdom	5,201	Sunk	46°17′N 36°20′W
8 June 1941	Pendrecht	Netherlands	10,746	Sunk	45°18′N 36°40′W
12 June 1941	Empire Dew	United Kingdom	7,005	Sunk	51°09′N 30°16′W

== See also ==
- Battle of the Atlantic

== Bibliography ==
- Blair, Clay (1996). Hitler's U-Boat War. London: Weidenfeld & Nicolson. ISBN 0-297-84076-2.
- Bridgland, Tony (2002). Waves of Hate. Barnsley: Leo Cooper. ISBN 0-85052-822-4.
- Busch, Rainer; Röll, Hans-Joachim (1999). German U-boat commanders of World War II : a biographical dictionary. Translated by Brooks, Geoffrey. London, Annapolis, Md: Greenhill Books, Naval Institute Press. ISBN 1-55750-186-6.
- Duggan, John P (2003). Herr Hempel. Sallins: Irish Academic Press. ISBN 0-7165-2757-X.
- Gröner, Erich; Jung, Dieter; Maass, Martin (1991). German Warships 1815–1945, U-boats and Mine Warfare Vessels. Vol. 2. Translated by Thomas, Keith; Magowan, Rachel. London: Conway Maritime Press. ISBN 0-85177-593-4.
- Sharpe, Peter (1998). U-Boat Fact File. Leicester: Midland Publishing. ISBN 1-85780-072-9.
- Nagorski, Tom (2006). Miracles on the Water: The Heroic Survivors of a World War II U-Boat Attack. New York: Hyperion Books. ISBN 978-1-4013-0150-7.
