= SS Germaine =

History
- Name: (United Kingdom) SS Glenetive (1911-1921); (United Kingdom) SS Ocean Prince (1921-1935); (Greece) SS Germaine (1935-1939)
- Owner: Castanos S. & Sons
- Port of registry: Piraeus, Greece
- Builder: Charles Connell & Co. Ltd.
- Yard number: 339
- Launched: 22 August 1911
- Completed: 1911
- Maiden voyage: 1911
- In service: 1911
- Identification: SVEE
- Fate: Torpedoed and sunk 15 December 1939

General characteristics
- Type: Cargo ship
- Tonnage: 5,217 GRT
- Length: 125.1 metres (410 ft 5 in)
- Beam: 15.9 metres (52 ft 2 in)
- Depth: 8.5 metres (27 ft 11 in)
- Installed power: Triple expansion steam engine
- Propulsion: Screw propeller
- Speed: 10.5 knots

SS Germaine was a Greek cargo ship that was torpedoed by U-48 in the Atlantic Ocean (51°00′N 12°18′W), while she was travelling from Albany, New York, United States to Cork, Ireland.

== Construction ==
Germaine was constructed in 1911 at the Charles Connell & Co. Ltd. shipyard in Scotstoun, United Kingdom. She was completed in 1911 and she was named Germaine and served from 1911 until her demise in 1939. The ship was 125.1 metres (410 ft 5 in) long, with a beam of 15.9 metres (52 ft 2 in) and a depth of 8.5 metres (27 ft 11 in). The ship was assessed at 5,217 GRT. She had a Triple expansion steam engine driving a single screw propeller and the engine was rated at 536 nhp.

== Sinking ==
On 15 December 1939, Germaine was torpedoed and sunk by U-48 in the Atlantic Ocean, while she was travelling from Albany, New York, United States to Cork, Ireland with a cargo of Maize. There were no casualties, the survivors were saved by the Norwegian steamer SS Vlieland.

== Wreck ==
The wreck lies at (51°00′N 12°18′W), but the wreck's current condition is unknown.
