= U-boat Front Clasp =

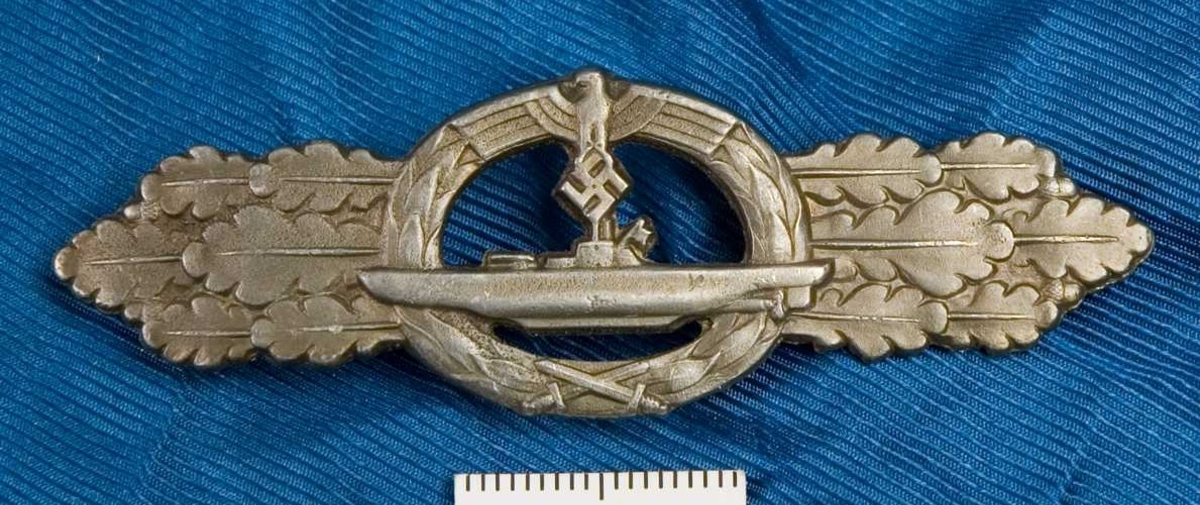
- U-boat Front Clasp designed by Wilhelm Ernst Peekhaus
- Type: Badge
- Awarded for: awarded to recognize continued combat service and valor
- Presented by: Nazi Germany
- Eligibility: Military personnel
- Campaign: World War II
- Status: Obsolete
- Established: 15 May 1944

Precedence
- Next (lower): U-boat War Badge

The U-boat Front Clasp (German: U-Boot-Frontspange) or U-boat Combat Clasp, was a World War II German Kriegsmarine military decoration awarded to holders of the U-boat War Badge to recognize continued combat service and valor.

== History ==
The award was instituted on 15 May 1944 to bring the U-boat force in line with other branches of the German armed forces, all of which had a similar award to recognize valor. There were no specified merits for earning the award; decoration was based on the recommendations of the U-boat commander and subject to approval by Karl Dönitz. Awards were often due to the number of patrols completed or demonstrations of valor in combat. The clasp was worn on the upper left breast.

== Design ==
Wilhelm Ernst Peekhaus of Berlin submitted the design of the badge, which consisted of a central laurel wreath with a stylized submarine and wings of oak leaves. The wings on either side consisted of six staggered oak leaves (for a total of twelve). Two crossed swords decorated the bottom of the central wreath; the submarine in the middle mimicked the design of the U-Boat War Badge. The wreath integrated an eagle with turned down wings holding a swastika. After the war ended, sailors in Germany could only wear the medal if it did not include National Socialist emblems – in keeping with the German Ordensgesetz. An alternative design with a complete laurel wreath (without eagle and swastika) with a centered submarine emblem exist for this purpose.

== Classes ==
The award was bestowed in two classes. The classes of the badge were manufactured in bronze, or silver.

- Bronze – the lower grade and awarded based on the number of war patrols, the degree of risks involved in the mission and for personal bravery
- Silver – on 24 November 1944, the silver class was introduced to further recognize bronze holders with continued merits, increased risk and acts of valor
