= Bernhard Rösing =

- Born: 29 October 1869; New York City, United States
- Died: 10 January 1947 (aged 77); Kiel, Germany
- Relatives: Hans-Rudolf Rösing (son)
- Military career
- Allegiance: German Empire
- Branch: Imperial German Navy
- Rank: Vizeadmiral (vice admiral)
- Commands: SMS Scharnhorst; SMS Kronprinz
- Conflicts: World War I

Bernhard Gustav Rösing (29 October 1869, New York City – 10 January 1947, Kiel) was a Vizeadmiral (vice admiral) of the Kaiserliche Marine during the World War I. Rösing commanded SMS Scharnhorst from November 1911 to December 1912 and SMS Kronprinz from November 1916 to November 1918.

== Career ==
Rösing was born on 29 October 1869 in New York. He was the third of eight children of the lawyer and diplomat Dr Johannes Rösing (1833-1907) and his wife Clara, née von Ammon (1843-1931. After receiving his Abitur in Berlin, he joined the Kaiserliche Marine (Imperial Navy) in 1888. Following his attendance of the Naval Academy in Kiel he progressed in rank from midshipmen, to the lieutenant ranks, to captain, and admiral. From 1908, he worked in the Naval Office (Reichsmarineamt) in Berlin. The marriage with the architect's daughter and the Naval officer Rudolf von Eickstedt's stepdaughter Elfriede Wünsche (1882–1961) produced one daughter (Elfriede) and four sons (Haro, Bernhard, Kurt-Wolf, Friedrich Wilhelm), three of which were killed in action in World War II. After the war, he was commissioned to dissolve the imperial shipyard in Danzig.
