= Günter Kuhnke =

German submarine commander

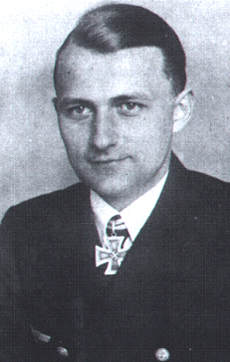
- Born: 7 September 1912; Elbing, West Prussia
- Died: 11 October 1990 (aged 78); Schortens
- Military career
- Allegiance: Weimar Republic (to 1933); Nazi Germany (to 1945); West Germany
- Branch: Reichsmarine; Kriegsmarine; German Navy
- Service years: 1931–45; 1955–72
- Rank: Korvettenkapitän (Kriegsmarine); Konteradmiral (Bundesmarine)
- Commands: U-28; U-125; U-853; 10th U-boat Flotilla; 33rd U-boat Flotilla destroyer Z-2 (D171)
- Conflicts: World War II: Battle of the Atlantic
- Awards: Knight's Cross of the Iron Cross; Stern zum Großen Verdienstkreuz des Verdienstordens der Bundesrepublik Deutschland

Günter Kuhnke (7 September 1912 – 11 October 1990) was a German submarine commander during World War II and later a Konteradmiral with the Bundesmarine, West Germany's navy. He was a recipient of the Knight's Cross of the Iron Cross of Nazi Germany.

== Career ==
Kuhnke commanded the U-28, U-125 and U-853, sinking eleven ships on nine patrols, for a total of 42,252 gross register tons (GRT) of Allied shipping plus the special service vessel HMS Prunella. He commanded 10th U-boat Flotilla from January 1942 until October 1944, then 33rd U-boat Flotilla until May 1945.

Kuhnke joined Bundesmarine in 1955. commanded the destroyer Z-2 (D171) (formerly USS Ringgold (DD-500)) from 14 July 1959 until 15 November 1960. In 1966, he was promoted to Konteradmiral (rear admiral) in 1966. Kuhnke retired from service in September 1972.

== Awards ==
- Wehrmacht Long Service Award, 4th class (2 October 1936)
- Iron Cross (1939)
  - 2nd Class (29 September 1939)
  - 1st Class (1 October 1939)
- War Merit Cross 2nd Class with Swords (30 January 1944)
- Knight's Cross of the Iron Cross on 19 September 1940 as Kapitänleutnant and commander of U-28
- Grand Cross of Merit of the Federal Republic of Germany (26 June 1969)
- Grand Merit Cross with Star of the Federal Republic of Germany (30 September 1972)

Military offices
Preceded by Korvettenkapitän Georg Schewe	Commander of the 33rd U-boat Flotilla; September – October 1944	Succeeded by —
Preceded by —	Commander of German destroyer Z-2 (formerly USS Ringgold); July 1959 – November 1960	Succeeded by Fregattenkapitän Otto Ites
Preceded by Kapitän zur See Hans Dominik	Commander of Kommando der Zerstörer (Destroyer Commando); 16 October 1960 – 1 October 1964	Succeeded by Kapitän zur See Theodor von Mutius
Preceded by Konteradmiral Albrecht Obermaier	Chief of the Navy Office; 1 April 1966 – 30 September 1972	Succeeded by Konteradmiral Günter Luther
