= Château de Pignerolle =

Castle in Maine-et-Loire, France

Coordinates: 47°28′12″N 0°28′26″W

The Chateau de Pignerolle is located to the east of Angers in the commune of Saint-Barthélemy-d'Anjou in the department of Maine-et-Loire in France.

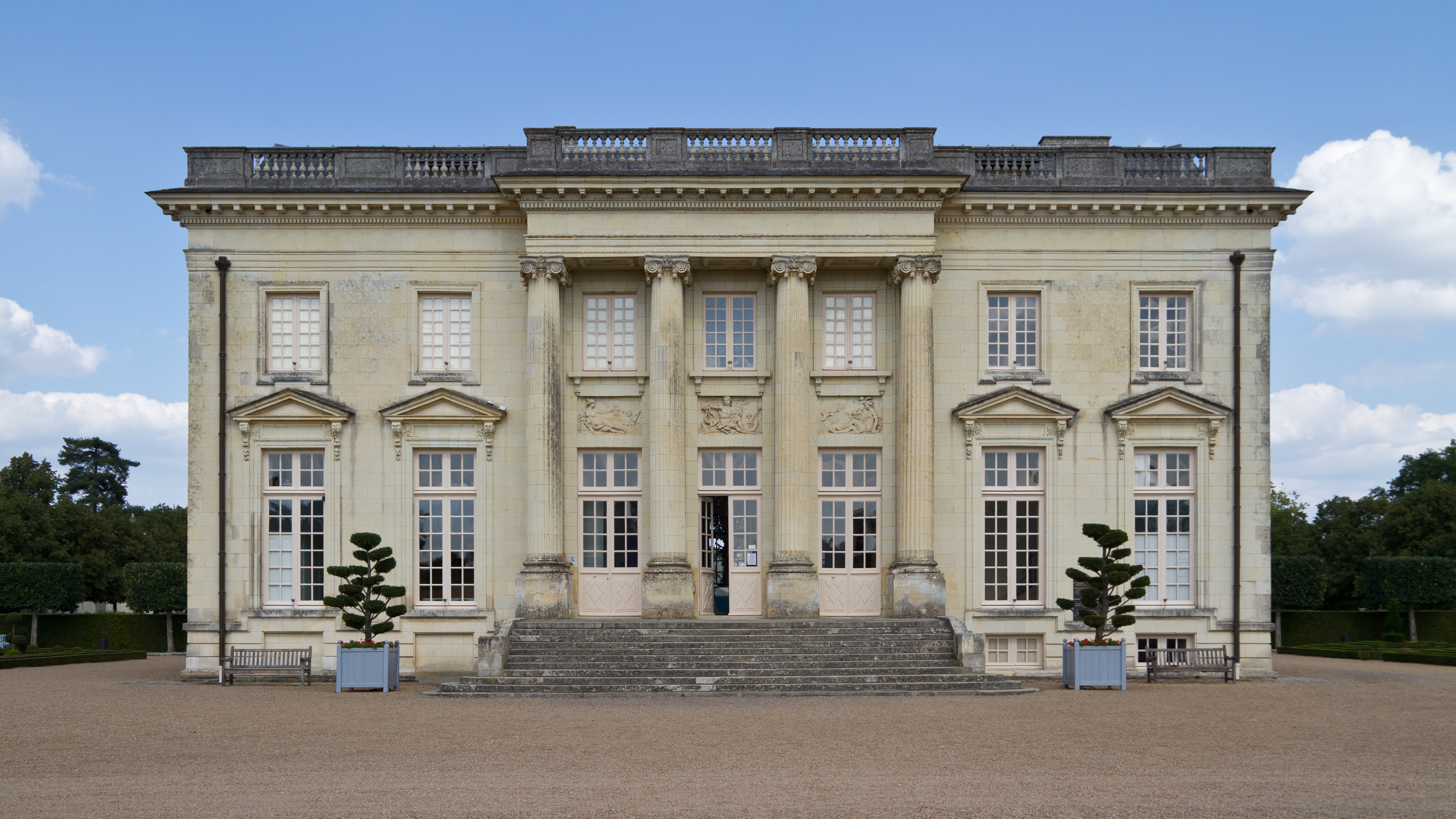
Château de Pignerolle

== Construction ==
Constructed in 1776 for the director of the equestrian academy in Angers, Marcel Avril de Pignerolle. Built in a neo-classic style with a four column frontage, it is 25m by 17m and lies in a park of 80 hectares.

== History ==
=== 1939–1940 ===
On 1 September 1939 Germany invaded Poland. On 2 September, the 125th Polish Infantry Regiment was formed at Pignerolle before going to fight on the Moselle. The Chateau was requisitioned by the Polish government-in-exile. The Polish General Staff settled into the Chateau. Władysław Raczkiewicz became Polish President in Exile on 30 September 1939 and lived at the Chateau of Pignerolles from 2 December 1939.

Shortly after the outbreak of war, the Polish cryptologists, including Marian Rejewski were evacuated to France, where they continued breaking Enigma-enciphered messages working with the French and British code breakers. The Polish Government in Exile were located in nearby Angers.

The battle for France which began on 10 May 1940 with the invasion of the low countries concluded on 22 June 1940. At the time there were numerous Polish military units in France by June 1940, with Polish personnel in the country totaling 80,000 men. The staff from Pignerolle were amongst the 24,352 Polish personnel evacuated as part of Operation Aerial to Great Britain before the Chateau was captured on 19 June and was requisitioned by the Wehrmacht on 8 July. The Polish cryptologists and their support staff resumed work undercover a few months later in Vichy France until the end of 1942.

=== 1942–1944 ===
Following the St Nazaire Raid on 28 March 1942, the commander of the Kriegsmarine, Erich Raeder, decided the risk to certain units of seaborne attack was high and decided to relocate the western command centre for U-boats to Pignerolle.

The Chateau was chosen as it was far enough from the sea to be safe, whilst the radio communications in the area were good as the land was very flat.

Construction began on a command bunker, the same plans were used for the late 1943 bunker Koralle located in Germany 30 km from Berlin, it is three contiguous bunkers, with its 3m thick roof it covers 1,500 sq m, being 34m by 56m in size. With ten other concrete constructions and thirty wooden barracks being completed by 600 Organisation Todt workers starting in April 1942 and finishing in May 1943.

The part buried main command bunker had teletype communications as well as 16 aerial masts on its roof to transmit and receive enigma coded messages with submarines in the Atlantic.

In Jul 1942 Hans-Rudolf Rösing was appointed as FdU West (Führer der Unterseeboote West) Pignerolle became his headquarters. He was responsible for the eight flotillas of boats committed to the Battle of the Atlantic, and thus a great majority of the entire U-boat fleet until autumn 1944. In February 1943 he was promoted to Fregattenkapitän, and one month later to Kapitän zur See.

On 30 January 1943 Doenitz was appointed Oberbefehlshaber der Kriegsmarine in place of Grossadmiral Raeder. He visited the Chateau on a number of occasions including August 1943.

All communications with U-Boats in the Atlantic were routed from Berlin through the Pignerolle command and communications centre.

The park was used by up to 1,000 German submariners for rest, relaxation and training purposes. In case of an air raid, the men could shelter in bunkers that were designed as two story above ground air raid shelters. A 133m tunnel was constructed from the Chateau to the command bunker. The bunkers around the Chateau do not conform to the standardized Regelbau system. The Chateau received submariner visitors from Italy and Japan during 1944.

The Germans departed on 9 August 1944, setting fire to the equipment in the main bunker.

There is little evidence of aerial attacks on Pigerolle, possible because of the importance of intercepting enigma coded messages to submarines that could be decoded. On average 31 boats operated in any one month and of those, 16–17 disappeared per month, in total, 371 U-Boats were lost in the Battle of the Atlantic almost all whilst commanded from Pignerolle.

== 1945-date ==
The barracks were used firstly by US troops then as a repatriation center until in January 1946 it housed 1,000 displaced people whose homes had been destroyed during the war, they continued in use until 1964. Listed as a national monument in 1961.

The command bunker was taken over by the French government as a reserve nuclear fallout center for President Charles de Gaulle during the Cold War era, moving to the ownership of the French Government in 1964. It is still not accessible to the public although several of the other bunkers have been opened to public viewing on occasions.

Acquired by Angers in 1971, the park, gardens and Chateau were restored over the next 20 years.

From 1992 until it closed in 2015 the Chateau was a museum dedicated to European communications from prehistoric times until the 20th century.

The gardens remain open to the public and occasional events are held in the park.

== Bibliography ==
- Kozaczuk, Władysław (1984). Kasparek, Christopher (ed.). Enigma: How the German Machine Cipher Was Broken, and How It Was Read by the Allies in World War Two. Frederick, MD: University Publications of America. ISBN 978-0-89093-547-7.

== See also ==
- Calameo.com: Les Loups de Pignerolle—(in French)
