= HMS Dundee (L84) =

Sloop of the Royal Navy

Coordinates: 56°45′N 14°14′W

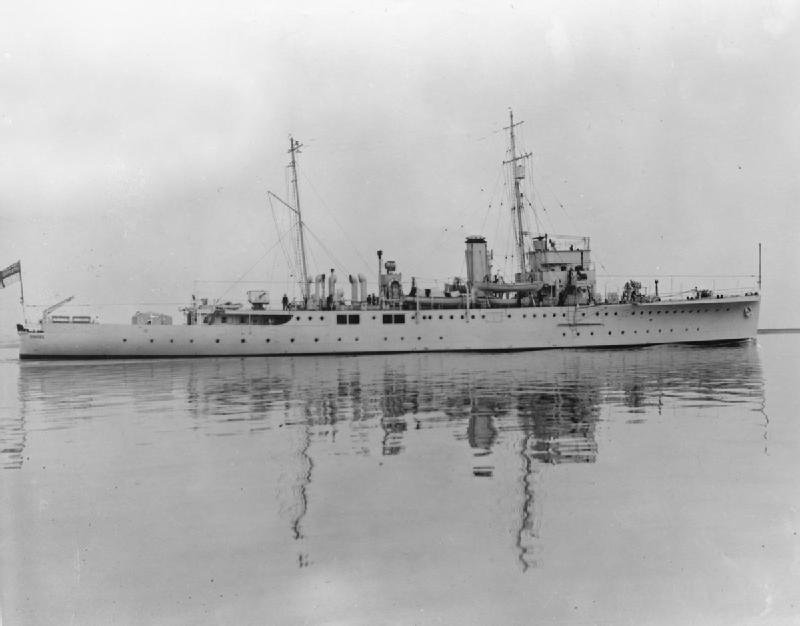
- HMS Dundee (L84)

History

United Kingdom
- Name: HMS Dundee
- Builder: Chatham Dockyard
- Laid down: 11 December 1931
- Launched: 20 September 1932
- Commissioned: 31 March 1933
- Identification: Pennant number: L84
- Fate: Sunk on 15 September 1940

General characteristics
- Displacement: 1,105 long tons (1,123 t)
- Length: 281 ft (86 m)
- Beam: 35 ft (11 m)
- Draught: 8 ft 3 in (2.51 m)
- Propulsion: Geared turbines, 2 shafts, 2,000 shp (1,491 kW)
- Speed: 16 knots (18 mph; 30 km/h)
- Complement: 95
- Armament: 2 × QF 4 in (100 mm) Mk V guns (2×1); 4 × .5 inch anti-aircraft machine guns (1×4)

HMS Dundee was a Shoreham-class sloop (Note: Officially classified as being a member of the "repeat Shoreham-class", although sometimes described as the Falmouth-class) of the Royal Navy. The ship was built at Chatham Dockyard, entering service in 1933.

The ship saw service primarily as a convoy escort in the Atlantic. She was sunk by a German submarine while escorting one of these convoys in September 1940.

== Construction and design ==
The British Admiralty ordered four sloops as part of the 1930 construction programme, with three ordered from Devonport and one from Chatham dockyard. Classified as repeat Shoreham or Falmouth-class ships, they, like the four Shoreham-class sloops ordered under the 1929 construction programme, were a lengthened and improved version of the Hastings class of the 1928 programme, which were themselves a modification of the Bridgewater class. They were intended for a dual role of patrol service in overseas stations in peacetime and minesweeping during war.

Dundee was 281 feet 4 inches (85.75 m) long overall, with a beam of 35 feet (10.67 m) and a draught of 10 feet 2 inches (3.10 m) at full load. Displacement was 1,060 long tons (1,080 t) standard and 1,515 long tons (1,539 t) deep load. Two Admiralty 3-drum water-tube boilers fed two geared steam turbines which drove two propeller shafts. The machinery was rated at 2,000 shaft horsepower (1,500 kW), giving a speed of 16.5 knots (30.6 km/h; 19.0 mph).

The ship's main gun armament consisted of two 4-inch (102 mm) QF Mk V guns mounted fore-and-aft on the ship's centreline, with the forward gun on a High-Angle (HA) anti-aircraft mounting and the aft gun on a Low-Angle (LA) mounting, suitable only for use against surface targets. Four 3-pounder saluting guns completed the ship's gun armament. The initial anti-submarine armament consisted of four depth charges. The ship had a crew of 100 officers and other ranks.

Dundee was laid down at Chatham Dockyard on 11 December 1931. She was launched on 20 September 1932 and completed on 31 March 1933, with the pennant number L84.

== Service history ==
Following commissioning, Dundee was assigned to the America and West Indies Station, based at the Royal Naval Dockyard in the Imperial fortress colony of Bermuda, replacing the old sloop Heliotrope. On 11 June 1936, she attempted to salvage the cargo ship Basil, which had run aground off the coast of Brazil on 1 June. In October 1935 she recommissioned at Portsmouth before rejoining the America and West Indies Station at Bermuda.

Dundee served as an escort for convoys during the Battle of the Atlantic. She was sunk at 00.25 hours on 15 September 1940 by the most successful German submarine of the war, U-48, commanded at that time by Kapitänleutnant Heinrich Bleichrodt.

U-48 attacked a convoy, SC 3, of which Dundee was the only escort. U-48 missed the British merchant ship Empire Soldier, but later torpedoed and sank Dundee, commanded by Capt. O.M.F. Stokes, RN, in position 56º45'N, 14º14'W, off Northern Ireland.

The Imperial War Museum has a recording from its sound archives of W J H Mills, a Canadian serving with the Royal Navy on Dundee, describing the sinking. In the recording he recounts "The blast was so severe that it tore the lockers away from the bulkhead mess – we knew we'd been hit – there was no mistaking it."
