= MT Gustaf E. Reuter =

History

Sweden
- Name: Gustaf E. Reuter
- Owner: Rederi AB Reut, Kungsbacka, Halland, Sweden
- Builder: Eriksbergs M.V., Gothenburg, Sweden
- Launched: 14 February 1928
- Fate: Torpedoed and sunk, 27 November 1939

General characteristics
- Type: Oil tanker
- Tonnage: 6,336 GRT
- Length: 418 ft 9 in (127.64 m)
- Beam: 55 ft 11 in (17.04 m)
- Depth: 32 ft 1 in (9.78 m)
- Propulsion: 543 nhp (405 kW) diesel engine
- Crew: 34

MT Gustaf E. Reuter was a 6,336-ton Swedish motor tanker belonging to the company Rederi AB Reut. She was built in 1928 by the Eriksbergs Mekaniska Verkstad shipyard in Gothenburg.

On a voyage from Haugesund to Curaçao she was torpedoed and sunk by the U-boat U-48 at 00:30 on 27 November 1939 at the position 59°38′N 02°03′W, 14 miles (23 km) west northwest from Fair Isle, in Shetland, Scotland, and broke in two. The wreck was sunk by an escort vessel the next day. One person died while 33 survived.
