= Herbert Schultze =

German submarine commander

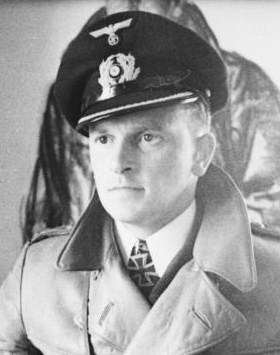
- Herbert Schultze in 1941
- Born: 24 July 1909; Kiel, Schleswig-Holstein, German Empire
- Died: 3 June 1987 (aged 77); London, England, United Kingdom
- Military career
- Allegiance: Weimar Republic (to 1933); Nazi Germany (to 1945); West Germany
- Branch: Reichsmarine; Kriegsmarine; German Navy
- Service years: 1930–1945; 1956–1968
- Rank: Korvettenkapitän (Kriegsmarine); Kapitän zur See (Bundesmarine)
- Commands: U-2,31 January 1938 – 16 March 1939 (Training); U-48, 22 April 1939 – 20 May 1940 (five patrols); U-48, 17 December 1940 – 27 July 1941 (three patrols); 3rd U-boat Flotilla; Department II, Marineschule Mürwik
- Conflicts: Second Battle of the Atlantic
- Awards: Knight's Cross of the Iron Cross with Oak Leaves

Herbert Emil Schultze (24 July 1909 – 3 June 1987) was a German U-boat (submarine) commander of the Kriegsmarine (the German navy in World War II). He commanded U-48 for eight patrols during the early part of the war, sinking 169,709 gross register tons (GRT) of shipping. Schultze was a recipient of the Knight's Cross of the Iron Cross with Oak Leaves. It was Germany's highest military decoration at the time of its presentation to Schultze. (Note: Until late September 1941, the Knight's Cross of the Iron Cross with Oak Leaves was second only to the Grand Cross of the Iron Cross (Großkreuz des Eisernen Kreuzes), which was awarded only to senior commanders for winning a major battle or campaign, in the military order of Nazi Germany. The Knight's Cross of the Iron Cross with Oak Leaves as highest military order was surpassed on 28 September 1941 by the Knight's Cross of the Iron Cross with Oak Leaves and Swords (Ritterkreuz des Eisernen Kreuzes mit Eichenlaub und Schwertern).)

== Early life and career ==
Schultze was born in Kiel. He joined the Reichsmarine on 1 April 1930 as a member of "Crew 30" (the incoming class of 1930). He underwent basic military training in the 2nd department of the standing ship division of the Baltic Sea in Stralsund (1 April 1930 – 30 June 1930). (Note: 2nd department —II. Abteilung) (Note: standing ship division —Schiffsstammdivision) Schultze was then transferred to the training ship Niobe (1 July 1930 – 9 October 1930), attaining the rank of Seekadett (midshipman) on 9 October 1930. Following a 14-month stay on board the cruiser Emden (10 October 1930 – 4 January 1932), he advanced in rank to Fähnrich zur See (officer cadet) on 1 January 1932.

Schultze then underwent a number of officer training courses at the Naval Academy at Mürwik before transferring to the light cruiser Leipzig (2 October 1933 – 7 October 1934). During this assignment, he was promoted to Oberfähnrich zur See (senior midshipman) on 1 April 1934 and to Leutnant zur See (acting sub-lieutenant) on 1 October 1934. He also served aboard the cruiser Karlsruhe with other future U-boat aces, including Heinrich Lehmann-Willenbrock.

In May 1937, now an Oberleutnant zur See, Schultze transferred to the U-boat force, taking command of the Type IIA U-boat U-2 on 31 January 1938. U-2 was assigned to the U-Bootschulflottille (U-boat school flotilla); he spent the next year and a half training with the submarine.

On 22 April 1939 Schultze commissioned U-48, a Type VIIB U-boat. U-48 was later to become the most successful submarine of the war. She was assigned to the 7th U-boat Flotilla, and spent the next four months in training. On 1 June 1939 Schultze was promoted to Kapitänleutnant.

== World War II ==
On 19 August 1939, on the eve of World War II, Schultze took U-48 out on her first patrol. On this patrol, which took U-48 to the North Atlantic, southwest of Ireland and to the Rockall Bank before returning to Kiel on 17 September, Leutnant zur See Reinhard Suhren served as 1st watch officer. U-48's 2nd watch officer on this patrol was Leutnant zur See Otto Ites.

He was at sea when the war started on 1 September 1939. On 11 September 1939 he sank the British 4,869-gross register ton (GRT) freighter Firby. After the sinking he sent the plain language radio message "cq - cq- cq - transmit to Mr. Churchill. I have sunk the British steamer "Firby". Posit 59.40 North and 13.50 West. Save the crew, if you please. German submarine." This message was addressed to the First Lord of the Admiralty Winston Churchill directly. Schultze and his crew had already sunk British steamships Royal Sceptre on 5 September and Winkleigh three days later for a combined total of 9,908 GRT.

Schultze intercepted the freighter Browning some time later and ordered it to pick up survivors from Royal Sceptre. Schultze's cease-fire action was on the provision that the British crew did not use their radios to report him. After returning to base, Schultze gave an interview to William L. Shirer, an American reporter, on 29 September 1939. The patrol yielded 14,777 GRT of shipping.

The second patrol began on 4 October and ended 21 days later. During the sortie he sank 37,153 GRT in 22 days. From 12 to 17 October 1939, Schultze sank five ships. Tanker Emile Miguet (14,115 GRT), Heronspool 15,202 GRT Louisiane 6,903 GRT, Sneaton 3,677 GRT and 7,256 GRT Clan Chisholm. Schultze abided by prize law in all but the sinking of Clan Chisholm which sailed in convoy HG 3. Nine men were killed aboard Schultze's first eight victims. During the attack he ordered the stern torpedo fired at a destroyer—probably HMS Escort—with no result. The crew photographed a number of the ships during their sinking.

Schultze's third patrol lasted from 20 November to 20 December. The boat sank 25,618 GRT. Over 8 and 9 December Schultze intercepted Brandon (6,668 GRT) and San Alberto (7,397 GRT). On 15 December he intercepted the Germaine (5,217 GRT). The patrol lasted only seven days. Upon Schultze's departure from the Atlantic Ocean on 19 December there were no U-boats in the sea for five days.

=== Knight's Cross ===
In January 1940 B-Dienst intercepted British naval signals suggesting Ark Royal was en route through the English Channel. Schultze was ordered to take up position at the Western end with two other boats—U-26 and U-37—and sink her. They were ordered to take up their stations on 12 February. Schultze, believing the other boats were joining him to attack a convoy he was shadowing, decided to stay with the convoy and ignored the orders of Befehlshaber der U-Boote (BdU). He proceeded to expend all but one torpedo and missed the carrier which docked in Portsmouth unmolested. Schultze received a mild reprimand by Dönitz. Schultze's fourth patrol yielded four more ships from 10 to 17 February 1940. Two Dutch ships and one Finnish ship accompanied the 12,306 GRT Sultan Star, sunk on 14 February 1940. Schultze was awarded the Knight's Cross of the Iron Cross for his successes on 2 March. He had sunk 109,074 GRT of shipping.

On 9 April 1940 the Kriegsmarine executed Operation Weserübung. In support of the invasions of Norway and Denmark U-48 carried out combat operations against warships. On 14 April Schultze attacked the battleship Warspite but the torpedoes failed. U-25 made attacks against the battleship in Vestfjorden without success, and probably due to torpedo failure. In a third attack, U-47 commanded by Günther Prien attempted to sink the battleship but failed for the same reason. The widespread mechanical failures of torpedoes at this stage of the war threatened morale. Detailed reports were made to Dönitz. On 20 May 1940 Schultze handed command of U-48 over to Hans Rudolf Rösing due to illness stemming from a stomach and kidney disorder. Schultze was sent to a naval hospital to recuperate. From October 1940 Schultze became part of the naval staff of the 7th U-boat Flotilla, at St Nazaire, in France.

On 17 December 1940 Schultze resumed command of U-48, relieving Heinrich Bleichrodt. His resumption of combat operations coincided with the period known as the "First Happy Time." In the midst of his next patrol—6 February 1941—Hitler issued Directive 23. The order singled out the British sea lanes as a priority target for the navy and Luftwaffe.

On 20 January 1941 Schultze began his sixth patrol which ended on 17 February. Nicolas Angelos, a 4,351 GRT ship, was sunk from convoy OB 279 on 1 February and Nailsea Lass, 4,289 GRT followed from convoy SLS 64 23 days later. The convoy was attacked by Admiral Hipper and several other U-boats. A seventh patrol from 17 March–8 April 1941 resulted in four sinkings. Schultze intercepted HX 115 on 29 March and sank three ships. The Hylton 5,197 GRT, Germanic, 5,352 GRT, and Limbourg, 2,483 GRT. The detached Beaverdale was sunk on 2 April which increased the tally by 9,957 GRT. In Schultze's eighth and penultimate patrol from 22 May–17 June 1941, he sank five ships. On 3 June Inversuir 9,456 GRT from convoy OB 327, on the 5th Wellfield 6,054 GRT from convoy OB 328, and on the 6th and 8th Tregarthen 5,201 GRT and then Pendrecht 10,746 GRT from convoy OB 329. Empire Dew 7,005 GRT from convoy OG 64 was Schultze's final victim.

=== Ashore ===
Schultze was thus awarded the Oak Leaves to his Knight's Cross on 12 June 1941. The presentation was made on 30 June 1941 by Hitler at the Führer Headquarter Wolfsschanze (Wolf's Lair) in Rastenburg (now Kętrzyn in Poland). (Note: Also present at the award ceremony were the U-boat commanders Kapitänleutnant Engelbert Endraß and Kapitänleutnant Heinrich Liebe who were also awarded the Oak Leaves to the Knight's Cross.)

On 27 July 1941 Schultze left U-48 to take command of the 3rd U-boat Flotilla operating from La Rochelle, also in France. He served in this capacity until March 1942, when he was assigned to the staff of Marinegruppe Nord as Admiral Staff Officer for U-boats. He was assigned to the staff of Admiral Karl Dönitz in December 1942. On 1 April 1943 he was promoted to Korvettenkapitän. In March 1944 he was assigned as commander of Department II, Marineschule Mürwik, where he served to the end of the war.

== Post-war ==
In August 1945 he was employed by the Allies as commander of the Naval Academy at Mürwik near Flensburg and the Heinz Krey-bearing. In November 1945, now a civilian, he took the job of manager of the naval facilities in Flensburg-Mürwik until October 1946.

On 2 July 1956, Schultze joined the Bundesmarine of West Germany and served in a string of staff positions. His first disposition was commander of the 3rd Ship Home Department. (Note: 3rd Ship Home Department—3. Schiffsstammabteilung) He served in this capacity from 2 July 1956 to 15 February 1959. He then served as Staff Officer Personnel (A1) on the command staff of the naval base, was commander of convoy ships, teaching group leaders at the Naval Academy and head of the volunteer adoption headquarters of the Navy until his retirement on 30 September 1968 with the rank of Kapitän zur See. Schultze died on 3 June 1987 in London.

== Summary of military career ==
As commander of U-48, Schultze is credited with sinking 26 ships totalling 169,709 gross register tons (GRT), damaging three ships of 169,709 GRT and damaging one ship of 9,456 GRT.

=== Awards ===
- Wehrmacht Long Service Award 4th Class (2 October 1936)
- Olympic Games Decoration (20 April 1937)
- Iron Cross (1939)
  - 2nd Class (25 September 1939)
  - 1st Class (27 October 1939)
- Knight's Cross of the Iron Cross with Oak Leaves
  - Knight's Cross on 1 March 1940 as Kapitänleutnant and commander of U-48
  - 15th Oak Leaves on 12 June 1941 as Kapitänleutnant and commander of U-48
- Croce di Guerra with Swords (14 October 1941)
- U-boat War Badge (1939) (25 October 1939)
  - with Diamonds (15 July 1941)

=== Promotions ===
Reichsmarine

- Offiziersanwärter (officer cadet) – 1 April 1930
- Seekadett (naval cadet) – 9 October 1930
- Fähnrich zur See (midshipman) – 1 January 1932
- Oberfähnrich zur See (senior midshipman) – 1 April 1934
- Leutnant zur See (acting sub-lieutenant) – 1 October 1934

Kriegsmarine

- Oberleutnant zur See (sub-lieutenant) – 1 June 1936
- Kapitänleutnant (captain lieutenant/lieutenant) – 1 June 1939
- Korvettenkapitän (corvette captain/lieutenant commander) – 18 March 1943, effective as of 1 April 1943

Bundesmarine

- Fregattenkapitän (frigate captain/commander) - 1 November 1956, effective as of 2 July 1956
- Kapitän zur See (captain at sea/captain) - 1 July 1966

== Notes ==
Military offices
Preceded by Kapitänleutnant Hans-Rudolf Rösing	Commander of 3rd U-boat Flotilla; July 1941 – March 1942	Succeeded by Kapitänleutnant Heinz von Reiche
