= German submarine U-105 (1940) =

German World War II submarine

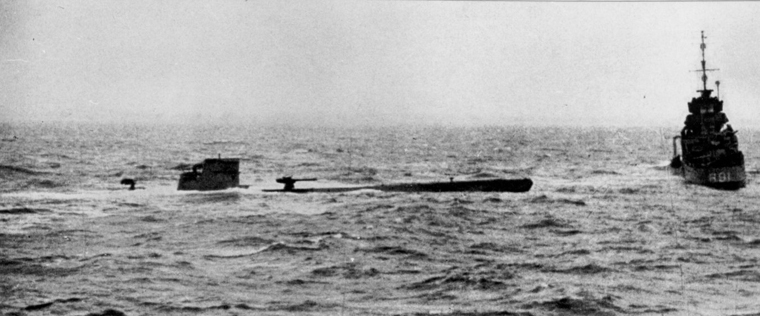
- U-110, a U-boat of the same type as U-105

History

Nazi Germany
- Name: U-105
- Ordered: 24 May 1938
- Builder: DeSchiMAG AG Weser, Bremen
- Yard number: 968
- Laid down: 16 November 1939
- Launched: 15 June 1940
- Commissioned: 10 September 1940
- Home port: Lorient, France
- Fate: Sunk on 2 June 1943

General characteristics
- Class & type: Type IXB submarine
- Displacement: 1,051 t (1,034 long tons) surfaced; 1,178 t (1,159 long tons) submerged
- Length: 76.50 m (251 ft) o/a; 58.75 m (192 ft 9 in) pressure hull
- Beam: 6.76 m (22 ft 2 in) o/a; 4.40 m (14 ft 5 in) pressure hull
- Draught: 4.70 m (15 ft 5 in)
- Speed: 18.2 knots (33.7 km/h; 20.9 mph) surfaced; 7.3 knots (13.5 km/h; 8.4 mph) submerged
- Range: 12,000 nmi (22,000 km; 14,000 mi) at 10 knots (19 km/h; 12 mph) surfaced; 64 nmi (119 km; 74 mi) at 4 knots (7.4 km/h; 4.6 mph) submerged
- Armament: 6 × 53.3 cm (21 in) torpedo tubes (four bow, two stern); 22 × torpedoes or 44 TMA mines; 1 × 10.5 cm (4.1 in) SK C/32 deck gun (180 rounds); 1 × 3.7 cm (1.5 in) SK C/30 AA gun; 1 × twin 2 cm FlaK 30 AA guns

Service record
- Part of: 2nd U-boat Flotilla; 10 September 1940 – 2 June 1943
- Identification codes: M 22 946
- Commanders: Kptlt. Georg Schewe; 10 September 1940 – 6 January 1942; K.Kapt. Heinrich Schuch; 7 January – 30 September 1942; Oblt.z.S. Hans-Adolf Schweichel; 1 – 29 October 1942; Kptlt. Jürgen Nissen; 29 October 1942 – 2 June 1943
- Operations: 9 patrols: 1st patrol: 24 December 1940 – 31 January 1941; 2nd patrol: 22 February – 13 June 1941; 3rd patrol: 3 August – 20 September 1941; 4th patrol: 8 November – 13 December 1941; 5th patrol: 25 January – 8 February 1942; 6th patrol: 25 February – 15 April 1942; 7th patrol: a. 7 – 12 June 1942; b. 28 – 30 June 1942; 8th patrol: 23 November 1942 – 14 February 1943; 9th patrol: 16 March – 2 June 1943
- Victories: 22 merchant ships sunk (123,924 GRT); 1 warship sunk (1,546 tons)

German submarine U-105 was a Type IXB U-boat of Nazi Germany's Kriegsmarine. She was ordered on 24 May 1938 as part of Germany's naval rearmament program. Her keel was laid down in Bremen on 16 November 1938. After roughly seven months of construction, she was launched on 15 June 1940 and formally commissioned into the Kriegsmarine on 10 September 1940.

During her three-year career, U-105 sank 23 vessels for a total loss of 123,924 gross register tons (GRT) and 1,546 tons before being sunk by the Free French Forces off the coast of Dakar (Senegal) on 2 June 1943.

== Construction and design ==
=== Construction ===
U-105 was ordered by Nazi Germany's Kriegsmarine on 24 May 1938; her keel was laid down on 16 November 1938 by DeSchiMAG AG Weser in Bremen as yard number 968. She was launched on 15 June 1940 and commissioned on 10 September under the command of Kapitänleutnant Georg Schewe.

=== Design ===
Type IXB submarines were slightly larger than the original Type IX submarines, later designated IXA. U-105 had a displacement of 1,051 tonnes (1,034 long tons) when at the surface and 1,178 tonnes (1,159 long tons) while submerged. The U-boat had a total length of 76.50 m (251 ft), a pressure hull length of 58.75 m (192 ft 9 in), a beam of 6.76 m (22 ft 2 in), a height of 9.60 m (31 ft 6 in), and a draught of 4.70 m (15 ft 5 in). The submarine was powered by two MAN M 9 V 40/46 supercharged four-stroke, nine-cylinder diesel engines producing a total of 4,400 metric horsepower (3,240 kW; 4,340 shp) for use while surfaced, two Siemens-Schuckert 2 GU 345/34 double-acting electric motors producing a total of 1,000 metric horsepower (740 kW; 990 shp) for use while submerged. She had two shafts and two 1.92 m (6 ft) propellers. The boat was capable of operating at depths of up to 230 metres (750 ft).

The submarine had a maximum surface speed of 18.2 knots (33.7 km/h; 20.9 mph) and a maximum submerged speed of 7.3 knots (13.5 km/h; 8.4 mph). When submerged, the boat could operate for 64 nautical miles (119 km; 74 mi) at 4 knots (7.4 km/h; 4.6 mph); when surfaced, she could travel 12,000 nautical miles (22,000 km; 14,000 mi) at 10 knots (19 km/h; 12 mph). U-105 was fitted with six 53.3 cm (21 in) torpedo tubes (four fitted at the bow and two at the stern), 22 torpedoes, one 10.5 cm (4.13 in) SK C/32 naval gun, 180 rounds, and a 3.7 cm (1.5 in) SK C/30 as well as a 2 cm (0.79 in) C/30 anti-aircraft gun. The boat had a complement of forty-eight.

== Service history ==
Under the command of Kapitänleutnant Georg Schewe, U-105 left Kiel on 24 December 1940. She spent 39 days in the North Sea. During this patrol, she sank the British ship Bassano on 9 January 1941, and Lurigethan, part of Convoy SL-61, on 26 January 1941, totalling 8,407 GRT. Five days later, on 31 January, U-105 arrived at the German-occupied port of Lorient, France, which would remain her home port for the rest of her career.

=== 1941 ===
U-105 left Lorient on her second patrol on 22 February 1941 and underwent a 112-day voyage in the Atlantic Ocean. Along with U-124, she was directed by the Oberkommando der Marine (Supreme naval headquarters), to attack Convoy SL-67. During this attack, U-105 sank the merchant ship Harmodius, on 8 March. Collectively, the two U-boats sank a total of 28,148 tons. U105 then stalked Convoy SL-68, sinking Medjerda on 18 March, Mandalika on 19 March and Clan Ogilvy, Benwyvis and Jhelum, all on the 21st. U-105 went on to score Nazi Germany's first kill off the coast of South America when she sank Ena de Larrinaga on 5 April 1941. Later during the patrol she sank Oakdene, part of Convoy OG 59. On 6 May, Benvrackie, part of Convoy OB 312; on the 13th, Benvenue part of Convoy OB 314 and on the 15th, Rodney Star on 16 May and Scottish Monarch on 1 June as part of Convoy OB 319. This was the second most successful U-boat patrol of the entire Second World War, with 12 ships sunk for a total of 71,450 GRT. On 5 May 1941, the 105mm deck gun exploded, wounding six crew members. U-105 returned to Lorient on 13 June, and remained there until 3 August, when she departed on her third war patrol.

On 5 August she was assigned to wolfpack 'Hammer' and remained with it until it was disbanded on 12 August, when she was reassigned to wolfpack 'Grönland', with which she remained until its disbanding on 27 August. She was then assigned to wolfpack 'Margrave', and sank the Panamanian merchant ship Montana, part of Convoy SC 42, on 11 September. She returned to Lorient nine days later. U-105 left Lorient on her fourth patrol on 8 November 1941 and spent 36 days in the North Atlantic. On 14 November she was assigned to wolfpack 'Steuben' and remained with it until 2 December. Having sunk no ships during the patrol, she returned to Lorient on 13 December 1941. Georg Schewe left the boat shortly after this patrol, and was replaced as commander by Heinrich Schuch.

=== 1942 ===
On 25 January 1942 U-105 left Lorient on her fifth patrol. On 31 January she sank the British warship HMS Culver, part of Convoy SL 98, south-west of Ireland, and, on 5 February 1942, she rescued seven men from a crashed German Dornier Do 24 350 miles off the coast of France. U-105 returned to Lorient on 8 February. Seventeen days later, on 25 February, U-105 left Lorient. Between 25 and 27 March, she sank the British merchant ship Narragansett and the Norwegian merchant ship Svenør off the east coast of the United States. U-105 returned to Lorient on 15 April after spending 50 days in the North Atlantic, and left on another patrol on 7 June. While crossing the Bay of Biscay, she was attacked by an Australian Short Sunderland aircraft from No. 10 Squadron RAAF. U-105 sought shelter in Ferrol, Spain and did not leave until 28 June, when she departed for Lorient, which she reached on the 30th. The attack apparently caused serious damage, as she did not sail again until 23 November. During this period, Oberleutnant zur See Hans-Adolf Schweichel was put in command of the boat, but did not undertake any patrols and was replaced by Oberleutnant zur See Jürgen Nissen, under whose command U-105 left Lorient.

While patrolling the North Atlantic she succeeded in sinking three British merchant ships; Orfor on 14 December 1942, C.S. Flight on 12 January 1943, and British Vigilance, part of Convoy TM 1, on 24 January, as well as the American freighter Cape Decision on the 27th. U-105 returned to Lorient on 14 February, and remained there until 16 March. During this patrol, (on 1 April), the boat's commander, Jürgen Nissen, was promoted to Kapitänleutnant. On 15 May 1943 U-105 sank the Greek merchant ship Maroussio Logothetis 250 miles southwest of Freetown. On 2 June 1943, while passing close to Dakar, U-105 was attacked and sunk by the one and only Potez-CAMS 141 flying boat "Antarés" from Free French Squadron 141. All 53 crew members were killed.

== Summary of raiding history ==
Date	Ship	Nationality	Tonnage (Note: Merchant ship tonnages are in gross register tons. Military vessels are listed by tons displacement.)	Fate
9 January 1941	Bassano	United Kingdom	4,843	Sunk
26 January 1941	Lurigethan	United Kingdom	3,564	Sunk
8 March 1941	Harmodius	United Kingdom	5,229	Sunk
18 March 1941	Medjerda	United Kingdom	4,380	Sunk
19 March 1941	Mandalika	Netherlands	7,750	Sunk
21 March 1941	Benwyvis	United Kingdom	5,920	Sunk
21 March 1941	Clan Ogilvy	United Kingdom	5,802	Sunk
21 March 1941	Jhelum	United Kingdom	4,038	Sunk
5 April 1941	Ena de Larringa	United Kingdom	5,200	Sunk
6 May 1941	Oakdene	United Kingdom	4,255	Sunk
13 May 1941	Benyrackie	United Kingdom	6,434	Sunk
15 May 1941	Benvenue	United Kingdom	5,920	Sunk
16 May 1941	Rodney Star	United Kingdom	11,803	Sunk
1 June 1941	Scottish Monarch	United Kingdom	4,719	Sunk
11 September 1941	Montana	Panama	1,549	Sunk
31 January 1942	HMS Culver	Royal Navy	1,546	Sunk
25 March 1942	Narrangansett	United Kingdom	10,389	Sunk
27 March 1942	Svenør	Norway	7,616	Sunk
14 December 1942	Orfor	United Kingdom	6,578	Sunk
12 January 1943	C.S. Flight	United Kingdom	67	Sunk
24 January 1943	British Vigilance	United Kingdom	8,093	Sunk
27 January 1943	Cape Decision	United States	5,106	Sunk
15 May 1943	Marusso Logothetis	Greece	4,669	Sunk

== Bibliography ==
- Blair, Clay (1998). Hitler's U-boat War: The Hunted, 1942-1945. Random House. ISBN 978-0-679-45742-8.
- Busch, Rainer; Röll, Hans-Joachim (1999). German U-boat commanders of World War II : a biographical dictionary. Translated by Brooks, Geoffrey. London, Annapolis, Md: Greenhill Books, Naval Institute Press. ISBN 1-55750-186-6.
- Carey, Alan (2004). Galloping Ghosts of the Brazilian Coast: United States Naval Air Operations in the South Atlantic During World War II. iUniverse. ISBN 978-0-595-31527-7.
- Dickson, Keith (2008). World War Two almanac. Facts on File. ISBN 978-0-8160-6297-3.
- Garzke, William; Dulin, Robert (1985). Battleships: Axis and Neutral Battleships in World War II. Naval Institute Press. ISBN 0-87021-101-3.
- Gröner, Erich; Jung, Dieter; Maass, Martin (1991). German Warships 1815–1945, U-boats and Mine Warfare Vessels. Vol. 2. Translated by Thomas, Keith; Magowan, Rachel. London: Conway Maritime Press. ISBN 0-85177-593-4.
- Jordan, Roger (2006). The World's Merchant Fleets, 1939: The Particulars And Wartime Fates of 6,000 Ships. Naval Institute Press. ISBN 1-59114-959-2.
- Kemp, Paul (1999). U-Boats Destroyed - German Submarine Losses in the World Wars. London: Arms & Armour. ISBN 1-85409-515-3.
- Lake, Jon (2000). Sunderland Squadrons of World War 2. Osprey Publishing. ISBN 1-84176-024-2.
- Mason, Geoffrey B. "HMS CULVER (Y 87) - ex-US Coast Guard Cutter". Service histories of Royal Navy warships in World War 2. Naval-history.net.
- Rohwer, Jürgen (1999). Axis submarine successes of World War Two: German, Italian, and Japanese submarine successes, 1939-1945. Naval Institute Press. ISBN 1-85367-340-4.
- Williamson, Gordon; Palmer, Ian (2002). Kriegsmarine U-boats, 1939-45 (2). Osprey Publishing. ISBN 1-84176-364-0.
- Williamson, Gordon (2005). Wolf Pack: The Story of the U-Boat in World War II. Osprey Publishing. ISBN 1-84176-872-3.
