= German submarine U-60 (1939) =

German World War II submarine

History

Nazi Germany
- Name: U-60
- Ordered: 21 July 1937
- Builder: Deutsche Werke, Kiel
- Yard number: 259
- Laid down: 1 October 1938
- Launched: 1 June 1939
- Commissioned: 22 July 1939
- Fate: Scuttled at Wilhelmshaven, 5 May 1945

General characteristics
- Class & type: Type IIC coastal submarine
- Displacement: 291 t (286 long tons) surfaced; 341 t (336 long tons) submerged
- Length: 43.90 m (144 ft 0 in) o/a; 29.60 m (97 ft 1 in) pressure hull
- Beam: 4.08 m (13 ft 5 in) (o/a); 4.00 m (13 ft 1 in) (pressure hull)
- Height: 8.40 m (27 ft 7 in)
- Draught: 3.82 m (12 ft 6 in)
- Installed power: 700 PS (510 kW; 690 bhp) (diesels); 410 PS (300 kW; 400 shp) (electric)
- Propulsion: 2 shafts; 2 × diesel engines; 2 × electric motors
- Speed: 12 knots (22 km/h; 14 mph) surfaced; 7 knots (13 km/h; 8.1 mph) submerged
- Range: 1,900 nmi (3,500 km; 2,200 mi) at 12 knots (22 km/h; 14 mph) surfaced; 35–42 nmi (65–78 km; 40–48 mi) at 4 knots (7.4 km/h; 4.6 mph) submerged
- Test depth: 80 m (260 ft)
- Complement: 3 officers, 22 men
- Armament: 3 × 53.3 cm (21 in) torpedo tubes; 5 × torpedoes or up to 12 TMA or 18 TMB mines; 1 × 2 cm (0.79 in) C/30 anti-aircraft gun

Service record
- Part of: 5th U-boat Flotilla; 22 July – 31 December 1939; 1st U-boat Flotilla; 1 January – 18 November 1940; 21st U-boat Flotilla; 19 November 1940 – 28 February 1945
- Identification codes: M 11 306
- Commanders: Oblt.z.S. / Kptlt. Georg Schewe; 22 July 1939 – 19 July 1940; Oblt.z.S. Adalbert Schnee; 19 July – 5 November 1940; Oblt.z.S. Georg Wallas; 6 November 1940 – 30 September 1941; Kurt Pressel; 1 October 1941 – May 1942; Oblt.z.S. Hans-Dieter Mohs; May – 6 December 1942; Lt.z.S. Otto Hübschen (acting); September – December 1942; Lt.z.S. / Oblt.z.S. Ludo Kreglin; 7 December 1942 – 15 February 1944; Oblt.z.S. Herbert Giesewetter; 16 February 1944 – 28 February 1945
- Operations: 9 patrols: 1st patrol: a. 4 – 21 November 1939; b. 4 December 1939; 2nd patrol: 12 – 19 December 1939; 3rd patrol: 9 – 21 January 1940; 4th patrol: 14 – 29 February 1940; 5th patrol: 4 – 27 April 1940; 6th patrol: 18 May – 11 June 1940; 7th patrol: 30 July – 18 August 1940; 8th patrol: 21 August – 6 September 1940; 9th patrol: a. 16 September – 2 October 1940; b. 5 – 8 October 1940
- Victories: 3 merchant ships sunk (7,561 GRT); 1 merchant ship damaged (15,434 GRT)

German submarine U-60 was a Type IIC U-boat of Nazi Germany's Kriegsmarine that served in the Second World War. She was built by Deutsche Werke AG, Kiel. Ordered on 21 July 1937, she was laid down on 1 October that year as yard number 259. She was launched on 1 June 1939 and commissioned on 22 July under the command of Oberleutnant zur See Georg Schewe.

U-60 was initially sent to the 5th U-boat Flotilla for training, until 1 October 1939, when she was reassigned to the 1st flotilla for a front-line combat role. U-60 carried out nine war patrols, sinking three ships for a total of 7,561 gross register tons (GRT) and damaging one other of 15,434 GRT. She then became a 'school' or training boat with the 21st flotilla for the rest of her career.

She was scuttled on 5 May 1945 at Wilhelmshaven.

== Design ==
German Type IIC submarines were enlarged versions of the original Type IIs. U-60 had a displacement of 291 tonnes (286 long tons) when at the surface and 341 tonnes (336 long tons) while submerged. Officially, the standard tonnage was 250 long tons (254 t), however. The U-boat had a total length of 43.90 m (144 ft 0 in), a pressure hull length of 29.60 m (97 ft 1 in), a beam of 4.08 m (13 ft 5 in), a height of 8.40 m (27 ft 7 in), and a draught of 3.82 m (12 ft 6 in). The submarine was powered by two MWM RS 127 S four-stroke, six-cylinder diesel engines of 700 metric horsepower (510 kW; 690 shp) for cruising, two Siemens-Schuckert PG VV 322/36 double-acting electric motors producing a total of 410 metric horsepower (300 kW; 400 shp) for use while submerged. She had two shafts and two 0.85 m (3 ft) propellers. The boat was capable of operating at depths of up to 80–150 metres (260–490 ft).

The submarine had a maximum surface speed of 12 knots (22 km/h; 14 mph) and a maximum submerged speed of 7 knots (13 km/h; 8.1 mph). When submerged, the boat could operate for 35–42 nautical miles (65–78 km; 40–48 mi) at 4 knots (7.4 km/h; 4.6 mph); when surfaced, she could travel 3,800 nautical miles (7,000 km; 4,400 mi) at 8 knots (15 km/h; 9.2 mph). U-60 was fitted with three 53.3 cm (21 in) torpedo tubes at the bow, five torpedoes or up to twelve Type A torpedo mines, and a 2 cm (0.79 in) anti-aircraft gun. The boat had a complement of 25.

== Service history ==
=== First, second and third patrols ===
U-60's first patrol meant that she left and returned to Kiel in November 1939, it involved the boat keeping close to the Norwegian coast.

She moved from Kiel to Wilhelmshaven on 4 December 1939.

The boat began her second patrol on 12 December 1939 and laid mines off Great Yarmouth on the 15th. One of them was struck by the City of Kobe on the 19th. The ship sank, one crew member was lost.

The submarine's third sortie involved patrolling the southern North Sea. It was uneventful.

=== fourth, fifth and sixth patrols ===
U-60's next three outings took her as far north as the eastern Scottish coast, as far east as the Norwegian coast and as far south as Belgium in the North Sea, all to no avail.

=== Seventh, eighth and ninth patrols ===
Nor did her run of bad luck end there. On 1 August 1940 she was attacked by the Dutch submarine O 21. That same day Junkers Ju 88s of KG 30 also attacked the boat. No damage from either assault was sustained. Things changed when she sank the Nils Gorthan 25 nautical miles (46 km; 29 mi) north northeast of Malin Head (the northernmost tip of the island of Ireland), on the 13th. After the patrol, she docked at Lorient in occupied France, on 18 August.

The boat's eighth patrol included an attack on the Volendam about 200 nautical miles (370 km; 230 mi) west of the Bloody Foreland (northwest Ireland) on 31 August 1940. The ship survived a hit from a torpedo, but while she was being docked prior to repairs being carried out, a second, unexploded torpedo was discovered lodged in the vessel's hull. U-60 was more successful with the Ulva, sinking her on 3 September 180 nautical miles (330 km; 210 mi) north northwest of Inishtrahull (the most northerly island of Ireland).

U-60 departed her French Atlantic base (Lorient) on 16 September 1940, heading for Bergen in Norway. Her route took her west of Ireland and through the gap between the Faroe and the Shetland Islands. The boat arrived in the Nordic port on 2 October.

She then moved from Bergen back to Kiel over October.

== Summary of raiding History ==
Date	Ship	Nationality	Tonnage (GRT)	Fate
19 December 1939	City of Kobe	United Kingdom	4,373	Sunk (Mine)
13 August 1940	Nils Gorthon	Sweden	1,787	Sunk
31 August 1940	Volendam	Netherlands	15,434	Damaged
3 September 1940	Ulva	United Kingdom	1,401	Sunk

== Bibliography ==
- Busch, Rainer; Röll, Hans-Joachim (1999). German U-boat commanders of World War II : a biographical dictionary. Translated by Brooks, Geoffrey. London, Annapolis, Md: Greenhill Books, Naval Institute Press. ISBN 1-55750-186-6.
- Busch, Rainer; Röll, Hans-Joachim (1999). Der U-Boot-Krieg, 1939-1945: Deutsche U-Boot-Verluste von September 1939 bis Mai 1945 [German U-boat losses from September 1939 to May 1945] (in German). Vol. IV. Hamburg, Berlin, Bonn: Mittler. ISBN 3-8132-0514-2.
- Gröner, Eric; Jung, Dieter; Maass, Martin (1991). German Warships 1815-1945: U-boats and Mine Warfare Vessels. Vol. 2. Translated by Thomas, Keith; Magowan, Rachel. London: Conway Maritime Press. ISBN 0-85177-593-4.
