= German submarine U-146 (1940) =

German World War II submarine

History

Nazi Germany
- Name: U-146
- Ordered: 25 September 1939
- Builder: Deutsche Werke, Kiel
- Yard number: 275
- Laid down: 30 March 1940
- Launched: 21 September 1940
- Commissioned: 30 October 1940
- Fate: Scuttled on 5 May 1945 at Wilhelmshaven

General characteristics
- Class & type: Type IID coastal submarine
- Displacement: 314 t (309 long tons) surfaced; 364 t (358 long tons) submerged
- Length: 43.97 m (144 ft 3 in) o/a; 29.80 m (97 ft 9 in) pressure hull
- Beam: 4.92 m (16 ft 2 in) o/a; 4.00 m (13 ft 1 in) pressure hull
- Height: 8.40 m (27 ft 7 in)
- Draught: 3.93 m (12 ft 11 in)
- Installed power: 700 PS (510 kW; 690 bhp) (diesels); 410 PS (300 kW; 400 shp) (electric)
- Propulsion: 2 shafts; 2 × diesel engines; 2 × electric motors
- Speed: 12.7 knots (23.5 km/h; 14.6 mph) surfaced; 7.4 knots (13.7 km/h; 8.5 mph) submerged
- Range: 3,450 nmi (6,390 km; 3,970 mi) at 12 knots (22 km/h; 14 mph) surfaced; 56 nmi (104 km; 64 mi) at 4 knots (7.4 km/h; 4.6 mph) submerged
- Test depth: 80 m (260 ft)
- Complement: 3 officers, 22 men
- Armament: 3 × 53.3 cm (21 in) torpedo tubes; 5 × torpedoes or up to 12 TMA or 18 TMB mines; 1 × 2 cm (0.79 in) C/30 anti-aircraft gun

Service record
- Part of: 1st U-boat Flotilla; 30 October - 31 December 1940; 22nd U-boat Flotilla; 1 January - 21 June 1941; 3rd U-boat Flotilla; 22 June - 31 August 1941; 22nd U-boat Flotilla; 1 September 1941 – 5 May 1945
- Identification codes: M 28 136
- Commanders: Oblt.z.S. / Kptlt. Eberhart Hoffmann; 30 October 1940 – 6 April 1941; Oblt.z.S. Otto Ites; 7 April - 26 August 1941; Lt.z.S. Ewald Hüstenbeck; 27 August - October 1941; Lt.z.S. / Oblt.z.S. Wihelm Grimme; October 1941 - June 1942; Oblt.z.S. Gerth Gemeiner; June 1942 - August 1942; Oblt.z.S. Jürgen Nissen; 8 September - October 1942; Oblt.z.S. Erich Hilsenitz; 2 November 1942 – 11 July 1943; Lt.z.S. / Oblt.z.S. Herbert Waldschmidt; 31 May 1943 – 30 December 1944; Oblt.z.S. Helmuth Wüst; 22 December 1944 – 9 March 1945; Oblt.z.S. Carl Schauroth; 10 March - 5 May 1945
- Operations: 2 patrols: 1st patrol: a. 17 June - 10 July 1941; b. 11–14 July 1941; 2nd patrol: 26 July - 11 August 1941
- Victories: 1 merchant ship sunk (3,496 GRT)

German submarine U-146 was a Type IID U-boat of Nazi Germany's Kriegsmarineduring World War II. Her keel was laid down on 30 March 1940 by Deutsche Werke in Kiel as yard number 275. She was launched on 21 September 1940 and commissioned on 30 October with Eberhart Hoffmann in command.

U-146 began her service life with the 1st U-boat Flotilla. She was then assigned to the 22nd flotilla and subsequently to the 3rd flotilla where she conducted two patrols, sinking one ship, in 1941. She spent the rest of the war as a training vessel, moving back to the 22nd flotilla.

She was scuttled on 5 May 1945.

== Design ==
German Type IID submarines were enlarged versions of the original Type IIs. U-146 had a displacement of 314 tonnes (309 long tons) when at the surface and 364 tonnes (358 long tons) while submerged. Officially, the standard tonnage was 250 long tons (254 t), however. The U-boat had a total length of 43.97 m (144 ft 3 in), a pressure hull length of 29.80 m (97 ft 9 in), a beam of 4.92 m (16 ft 2 in), a height of 8.40 m (27 ft 7 in), and a draught of 3.93 m (12 ft 11 in). The submarine was powered by two MWM RS 127 S four-stroke, six-cylinder diesel engines of 700 metric horsepower (510 kW; 690 shp) for cruising, two Siemens-Schuckert PG VV 322/36 double-acting electric motors producing a total of 410 metric horsepower (300 kW; 400 shp) for use while submerged. She had two shafts and two 0.85 m (3 ft) propellers. The boat was capable of operating at depths of up to 80–150 metres (260–490 ft).

The submarine had a maximum surface speed of 12.7 knots (23.5 km/h; 14.6 mph) and a maximum submerged speed of 7.4 knots (13.7 km/h; 8.5 mph). When submerged, the boat could operate for 35–42 nautical miles (65–78 km; 40–48 mi) at 4 knots (7.4 km/h; 4.6 mph); when surfaced, she could travel 3,800 nautical miles (7,000 km; 4,400 mi) at 8 knots (15 km/h; 9.2 mph). U-146 was fitted with three 53.3 cm (21 in) torpedo tubes at the bow, five torpedoes or up to twelve Type A torpedo mines, and a 2 cm (0.79 in) anti-aircraft gun. The boat had a complement of 25.

== Operational career ==
=== First patrol ===
The submarine's first patrol commenced with her departure from Kiel on 17 June 1941. She crossed the North Sea and negotiated the gap between the Faroe and Shetland Islands. She sank Pluto 100 nmi (190 km; 120 mi) north north-west of the Butt of Lewis (in the Outer Hebrides, Scotland). She then sailed to a point south-west of Ireland.

=== Second patrol ===
For her second patrol, she left Kiel on 26 July 1941. Her return was on 11 August. No further details are available.

=== Fate ===
The boat was scuttled in the Raederschleuse (lock) at Wilhelmshaven on 5 May 1945. The wreck was broken up on an unknown date.

== Summary of raiding history ==
Date	Ship	Nationality	Tonnage (GRT)	Fate
28 June 1941	Pluto	Finland	3,496	Sunk

== Bibliography ==
- Busch, Rainer; Röll, Hans-Joachim (1999). German U-boat commanders of World War II : a biographical dictionary. Translated by Brooks, Geoffrey. London, Annapolis, Md: Greenhill Books, Naval Institute Press. ISBN 1-55750-186-6.
- Gröner, Erich; Jung, Dieter; Maass, Martin (1991). U-boats and Mine Warfare Vessels. German Warships 1815–1945. Vol. 2. Translated by Thomas, Keith; Magowan, Rachel. London: Conway Maritime Press. ISBN 0-85177-593-4.
