= Heinrich Bleichrodt =

German U-boat commander

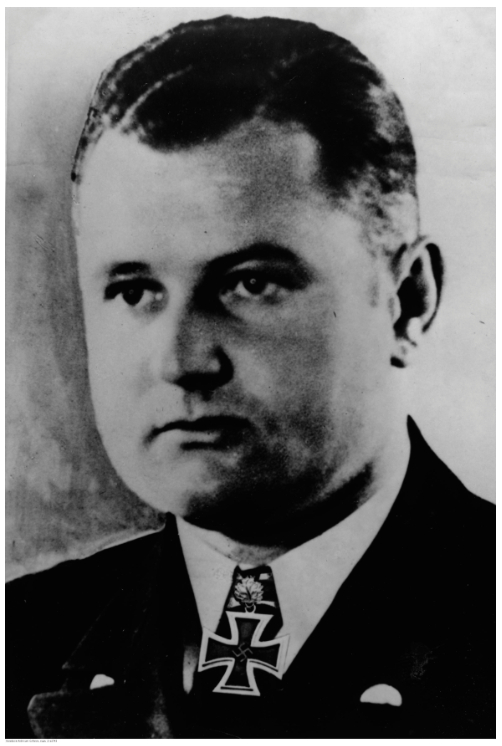
- Heinrich Bleichrodt
- Born: 21 October 1909; Berga, Kyffhäuser, German Empire
- Died: 9 January 1977 (aged 67); Munich, West Germany
- Military career
- Allegiance: Nazi Germany
- Branch: Kriegsmarine
- Service years: 1933–45
- Rank: Korvettenkapitän
- Nickname: Ajax
- Units: 7th U-boat Flotilla; 2nd U-boat Flotilla; 27th U-boat Flotilla; 22nd U-boat Flotilla
- Commands: U-48; U-67; U-109
- Awards: Knight's Cross of the Iron Cross with Oak Leaves

Heinrich Bleichrodt (21 October 1909 – 9 January 1977) was a German U-boat commander during the Second World War. From October 1939 until retiring from front line service in December 1943, he was credited with sinking 25 ships for a total of 152,320 gross register tons (GRT). He was awarded the Knight's Cross of the Iron Cross with Oak Leaves of Nazi Germany. Bleichrodt was tried and acquitted for war crimes in connection with the sinking of the SS City of Benares, which was carrying evacuated children. He earned the nickname "Ajax" during his time with the U-boats.

== Career ==
Bleichrodt was born in Berga, Kyffhäuser on 21 October 1909. In 1926 he was already at sea, aboard the Pamir and Peking, He entered the navy in 1933 and spent his initial training on the cadet ship Gorch Fock, followed by a period on the heavy cruiser Admiral Hipper. He was commissioned an ensign on 1 April 1935, promoted to sub-lieutenant on 1 January 1937 and to Lieutenant on 1 October 1939.

=== Submarine service ===
After training, Bleichrodt spent a period aboard the small training boat U-8 followed by a single patrol with later Knight's Cross winner Kapitänleutnant Wilhelm Rollmann aboard U-34 during June and July 1940. This was a highly successful cruise, sinking eight ships for a total of 22,434 GRT, with Bleichrodt receiving the Iron Cross 2nd Class on 25 July. He was then given command of his own U-boat, U-48 on 4 September 1940. He began his first war patrol aboard her on 8 September, going on to sink eight ships for a total of 36,189 tons.

On 15 September he sank HMS Dundee. He went on to torpedo and sink SS City of Benares on 18 September before returning to port on 25 September. Unknown to Bleichrodt, there were 90 children on board the liner being evacuated to Canada under the Children's Overseas Reception Board's initiative in order to escape the effects of the Blitz. 258 people, including 77 of the evacuees, died in the disaster. The sinking was controversial, but the ship was not marked as being an evacuation transport, and it is unlikely that Bleichrodt would have been aware that children were amongst the passengers. He was also limited in what aid he could have provided even if he had been aware. He had been awarded the U-boat War Badge 1939 on 24 September, and on his arrival in port on 25 September he received the Iron Cross 1st Class.

He put to sea again on 5 October and undertook another highly successful patrol, sinking eight ships, including three merchantmen from the ill-fated convoys SC 7 and HX 79. He returned to Kiel on 27 October having sunk 43,106 tons of shipping. Three days before returning, U-48 was radioed and Bleichrodt was informed that he was to be awarded the Knight's Cross. Bleichrodt refused to wear it until his IWO Oberleutnant zur See Reinhard 'Teddy' Suhren was also awarded one. Bleichrodt pointed out that Suhren had overseen all surface shooting on previous missions and was also entitled. Suhren duly received the Knight's Cross in November that year.

Bleichrodt left U-48 on 16 December 1940 and briefly took command of U-67 on 22 January 1941 until 4 June 1941. He did not carry out any war cruises before being moved to take command of U-109 on 5 June 1941. He carried out six patrols with her, not achieving the same degree of success he had had with U-48, but still sinking 13 ships for a total of some 80,000 tons. He received the Oak Leaves to his Knight's Cross on 23 September 1942, followed by the U-boat War Badge with Diamonds in October. He was promoted to Korvettenkapitän on 1 November 1943.

=== Retirement ===
During his sixth patrol with the U-109, Bleichrodt appears to have suffered a breakdown during an attack on a lone ship on 26 December 1942. He radioed U-boat headquarters to request an immediate return to port, but this was initially denied. On 30 December the U-109 radioed that Bleichrodt was no longer capable of commanding the U-boat, but U-boat headquarters insisted to continue the patrol, even if the IWO ( first watch officer ) had to take over. In the end, the IWO brought U-109 back to Saint Nazaire and Bleichrodt went to hospital.

He was transferred to a training job with the 27th U-boat Flotilla, spending five months there followed by a year in the 2nd ULD (U-boat training division) as tactical instructor for the officers. He received a final promotion to Korvettenkapitän (corvette captain) on 1 November 1943, and in July 1944 he was appointed as Chief of the 22nd U-boat Flotilla, a post he held until the end of the war.

== Later life ==
After the war, Bleichrodt was held by the Allies on war crimes charges pertaining to the sinking of the SS City of Benares. Bleichrodt was accused of sinking the ship with the full knowledge that it had been transporting evacuees. He reaffirmed the German position that there was no way that he or the crew of the submarine could have known who was on board. It was upheld and he was acquitted. Bleichrodt refused to apologise to the survivors, despite several crew members of U-48, including the radio operator, expressing their shock and regret once the facts became known.

Bleichrodt died in 1977.

== Awards ==
- Iron Cross (1939)
  - 2nd Class (25 July 1940)
  - 1st Class (25 September 1940)
- U-boat War Badge with Diamonds (1939)
  - U-boat War Badge (24 September 1940)
  - U-boat War Badge with Diamonds (September 1942)
- Knight's Cross of the Iron Cross with Oak Leaves
  - Knight's Cross on 24 October 1940 as Kapitänleutnant and commander of U-48
  - 125th Oak Leaves on 23 September 1942 as Kapitänleutnant and commander of U-109
- Croce di Guerra Italiana al Valore Militare (1 November 1941)
- War Merit Cross 2nd Class with Swords (1 January 1945)

Military offices
Preceded by Korvettenkapitän Wolfgang Lüth	Commander of 22nd U-boat Flotilla; July 1944 – May 1945	Succeeded by disbanded
