= List of World War II U-boat commanders =

This is a list of World War II U-boat commanders. Only sunk merchant ships are counted in the totals; warships and damaged ships are not.

Submariners suffered the highest casualty rate in the German military: 75%. Commanders killed in action are indicated by a † after their name.

| Name | Patrols | Ships sunk | Tonnage sunk (tons) | Notes | Picture |
|---|---|---|---|---|---|
| Ernst Bauer | 5 | 25 | 118,560 | Bauer (1914–1988) was given command of U-126 in March 1941. In October 1944, he became commander of the training unit 27th U-boat Flotilla, and during the last month of war he was transferred to the 26th U-boat Flotilla. Bauer rejoined the Bundesmarine in 1956 and held several staff positions before retiring in 1972. | |
| Heinrich Bleichrodt | 8 | 24 | 151,260 | Bleichrodt (1909–1977) was given command of U-48 in 1940, sailing on two patrols and sinking 15 ships totalling 79,295 GRT, including the SS City of Benares – an unmarked evacuation transport. After briefly commanding U-67, in June 1941 Bleichrodt took command of U-109. He carried out six patrols, sinking 13 ships for a total of some 80,000 tons. Bleichrodt then served in a training post with the 27th U-boat Flotilla and in the 2nd ULD ("2nd U-boat Training Division") as tactical instructor. In July 1944 he was appointed commander of the 22nd U-boat Flotilla. | |
| Carl Emmermann | 5 | 26 | 152,080 | Emmermann (1915–1990) took command of U-172 in November 1941. He became the commander of the 6th U-boat Flotilla in November 1943, and in August 1944 became the chief of the Erprobungsgruppe Typ XXIII ("Type XXIII Testing Group"). In March–April 1945, Emmermann was commander of U-3037, and in April–May 1945 he commanded the 31st U-boat Flotilla in Hamburg. In the final days of the war, he took part in infantry duty around Hamburg as commander of Marine-Battalion Emmermann. | |
| Engelbert Endrass † | 10 | 22 | 118,528 | Endrass (1911–1941) was 1WO (1st Watch Officer [1. Wachoffizier], second-in-command of a U-boat) of U-47 when Günther Prien took her into Scapa Flow and sank HMS Royal Oak. In May 1940, he took command of U-46, and in eight patrols sank 21 ships, before taking over U-567 in October 1941. He sank only one more ship. He was killed on 21 December 1941, when U-567 was sunk with all hands by depth charges from the British sloop HMS Deptford and corvette HMS Samphire, northeast of the Azores. | |
| Ulrich Folkers † | 5 | 17 | 82,873 | Folkers (1915–1943) first served as 1WO on U-37 under Nicolai Clausen. In November 1941, he took command of U-125. Folkers was killed along with his crew when U-125 was sunk on 6 May 1943 by British destroyers. | |
| Fritz Frauenheim | 9 | 18 | 78,248 | Frauenheim (1912–1969) served for more than a year as 1WO of U-25, before taking command of U-21 in October 1939. He went on five patrols and sank five ships. In November, he badly damaged the cruiser HMS Belfast after laying mines in the Firth of Forth. In March 1940, he commissioned U-101 and in four patrols sank 12 more ships, bringing his total to 19 ships sunk and two damaged. In December 1940, he became an instructor in the 2nd Training Division, then in September 1941 took command of the 23rd U-boat Flotilla in the Mediterranean. He commanded the 29th U-boat Flotilla from May 1942, then from February 1944 served on the staff of the Admiral der Kleinkampfverbände ("Admiral of Small Combat Units"). | |
| Harald Gelhaus | 10 | 19 | 100,373 | Gelhaus (1915–1997) commanded U-143 and U-107, sailing in ten patrols between March 1941 and June 1943. He then joined the staff of the OKM, the Naval High Command. From February 1944, he was a training officer in the 22nd and 27th U-boat Flotillas. He spent the final months of the war in staff positions, the last one being in Naval High Command North. | |
| Robert Gysae | 8 | 25 | 146,815 | Gysae (1911–1989) commanded U-98 and U-177. In January 1944, he became commander of training unit 25th U-boat Flotilla. In April 1945, during the last month of the war, Gysae commanded the Marinepanzerjagd-Regiment 1, a naval anti-tank regiment. After the war, he served in the Deutscher Minenräumdienst ("German Mine Sweeping Administration") for more than two years. In 1956, he rejoined the Bundesmarine, retiring in 1970 with the rank of Flottillenadmiral. | |
| Reinhard Hardegen | 5 | 22 | 115,656 | Hardegen (1913–2018) took command of U-147 in 1940 for a single patrol, then U-123 for another four patrols in 1941. In mid-1942, he became an instructor in the 27th U-boat Flotilla, and from March 1943 served as chief of the torpedo school at Mürwik. Hardegen served for few months in the Torpedowaffenamt ("Torpedo Weapon Department") before becoming Battalion Commander in Marine Infanterie Regiment 6 from February 1945, taking part in the fighting around Bremen. He was the last surviving "Ace of the Deep", dying on 9 June 2018 at the age of 105. | |
| Werner Hartenstein † | 5 | 19 | 97,489 | Hartenstein (1908–1943) commissioned U-156 in September 1941. On his second patrol, he attacked the refinery at Aruba with gunfire. On the fourth patrol, he was involved in the Laconia Incident. On his fifth patrol, on 8 March 1943, Hartenstein and his crew were killed when U-156 was sunk by depth charges dropped from a United States Navy PBY Catalina, east of the island of Barbados. | |
| Werner Hartmann | 4 | 26 | 115,337 | Hartmann (1902–1963) was commander of both U-37 and the 2nd U-boat Flotilla from January–May 1940, but this proved inefficient, and BdU decided to direct the U-boats from land. After three patrols, Hartmann moved to the BdU staff. In November 1940, he became commander of 2. Unterseeboots-Lehr-Division ("2nd U-boat Training Division"), and a year later took command of the 27th U-boat Flotilla. In November 1942, he took command of U-198 for a patrol to the Indian Ocean lasting 200 days, the third-longest patrol ever undertaken, and sank seven ships totalling 36,778 GRT. In 1944, Hartmann became FdU Mittelmeer ("Commander of U-boats in the Mediterranean"). After the war, he served several years in the Bundesmarine. | |
| Werner Henke | 7 | 24 | 155,714 | Henke (1909–1944) took command of U-515 in February 1942. U-515 was sunk by United States Navy aircraft and destroyers north of Madeira. Henke was taken to a secret interrogation centre known only as P. O. Box 1142 in Fort Hunt, Virginia, where his interrogator threatened to send him to England to face war crime charges if he did not cooperate. On 15 June 1944, Henke ran to the fence surrounding the interrogation centre and began to climb over. He ignored a guard's order to stop, and was shot and killed. | Werner Henke |
| Günter Hessler | 3 | 21 | 118,822 | Hessler (1909–1968) commissioned U-107 in 1940, and on his first patrol sank four ships for a total of 18,514 tons. He became famous for his second patrol – the most successful of the entire war – sinking 14 ships for a total of 86,699 tons. His third patrol accounted for another three ships for a total of 13,641 tons. Hessler then transferred to the BdU to serve on the staff of his father-in-law Karl Dönitz. After the war, he testified at the Nuremberg trials. In 1947, Hessler was commissioned by the British Royal Navy to write The U-Boat War in the Atlantic. Assisted by Alfred Hoschatt, former BdU staff officer and commander of U-378, he completed the three-volume work in 1951. | |
| Ulrich Heyse | 5 | 12 | 83,639 | (1906–1970) sailed on a single patrol on U-37 as Kommandantenschüler ("Commander-in-training"), before he commissioned U-128 in December 1941. He was an instructor from 1943, before taking command of the 32nd U-boat Flotilla in March 1945. | |
| Hans Jenisch | 6 | 17 | 110,139 | Jenisch (1913–1982) took command of U-32 in early 1940. He sank 17 ships, including the 42,348 ton RMS Empress of Britain, the largest ship sunk by a U-boat. Jenisch was taken prisoner in October 1940 when U-32 was sunk north-west of Ireland by two British destroyers. In 1956, he joined the Bundesmarine, holding mainly staff positions, but also commanding the frigate Hipper for a few months. | |
| Ernst Kals | 5 | 20 | 145,656 | Kals (1905–1979) took command of U-130 in June 1941. On 12 November 1942, during the Naval Battle of Casablanca he attacked the heavily guarded transport ships in Fedala Roads in Morocco, sinking three large troop ships for a total of 34,507 tons in five minutes. From January 1943 to the end of the war, he commanded the 2nd U-boat Flotilla. | |
| Günther Krech | 10 | 19 | 100,771 | Krech (1914–2000) commissioned U-558 in February 1941, and sailed on ten patrols, mostly in the Atlantic and the Caribbean. U-558 was sunk by US aircraft on 20 July 1943 in the Bay of Biscay. Only five men – Krech, the engineering officer, and three men of the gun crew – survived. | |
| Otto Kretschmer | 16 | 46 | 273,043 | Kretschmer (1912–1998) was the most successful of the World War II Aces of the Deep. As commander of U-35, U-23 and U-99 he sank 47 merchant ships in a remarkably short period of time, before being captured in March 1941 and spending the rest of the war in the Bowmanville POW camp, Canada. After the war, he rejoined the Bundesmarine, and became the Chief of Staff of the NATO Command COMNAVBALTAP in May 1965. He retired in September 1970 with a rank of Flottillenadmiral. During his time as a U-boat commander, he was given the nickname "The Tonnage King" because of his high GRT record. | Otto Kretschmer |
| Herbert Kuppisch † | 14 | 16 | 82,108 | Kuppisch (1909–1943) first commanded U-58, sailing on eight patrols between September 1939 and June 1940, and sinking four ships, including the British boom defence vessel HMS Astronomer. From August 1940, in command of U-94, he sailed on a further five patrols, and sank another 12 ships. From August 1941, he served on the staff of the BdU, before spending six months at the OKM. He finally returned to U-boats in July 1943, taking command of U-847. On 27 August 1943, only 30 days into her first patrol U-847 was sunk by aircraft from USS Card. There were no survivors. | Herbert Kuppisch |
| Georg Lassen | 4 | 26 | 156,082 | Lassen (1915–2012) took command of U-160 and sailed on four combat patrols in 1942–43, sinking a remarkable average of 39,020 GRT per patrol. In June 1943 Lassen was appointed tactical instructor and commander of the "Offiziers-kompanie" in 1. U-boot-Lehr-Division, a training unit for future U-boat commanders. | |
| Heinrich Lehmann-Willenbrock | 10 | 25 | 179,125 | Lehmann-Willenbrock (1911–1986) commanded the U-8, U-5 and U-96. In May 1942, he took command of the 9th U-boat Flotilla, transferring to the 11th U-boat Flotilla in December 1944. After spending a year in captivity after the German surrender, he served as captain on merchant ships, and from 1964 commanded the German nuclear-powered freighter Otto Hahn. Willenbrock acted as advisor to the film Das Boot, based on an account of one of his own war patrols in U-96. | Heinrich Lehmann-Willenbrock |
| Fritz-Julius Lemp † | 10 | 20 | 96,639 | Lemp (1913–1941) commanded U-30 and U-110. His first attack, on 3 September 1939, only two days after the British declaration of war, was the most controversial. Lemp sank what he thought was an armed merchant cruiser, but was in fact the passenger liner SS Athenia; 112 of her passengers died. The sinking resulted in bad publicity throughout the English-speaking world, while the German High Command systematically attempted to cover up this error. Not until January 1946, during the Nuremberg Trials, did Admiral Dönitz finally admit that Athenia had been torpedoed by U-30. Lemp was killed in May 1941 when U-110, on her second patrol, was captured east of Cape Farewell, Greenland, by the British destroyers HMS Bulldog and HMS Broadway. | Fritz-Julius Lemp |
| Heinrich Liebe | 9 | 34 | 187,267 | Liebe (1908–1997) commanded U-38 between 1938 and 1941, sinking 34 ships for a total of 187,267 GRT. In 1941 Liebe was assigned to the staff of Oberkommando der Marine, and from August 1944 was on the staff of the BdU. After the war, Liebe returned to his hometown in the Soviet sector. As he refused to train Soviet submariners, he was allowed only a series of menial occupations. | |
| Wolfgang Lüth | 16 | 46 | 225,204 | Lüth (1913–1945) was given command of U-9 in December 1939, going on to command U-13, U-138, U-43 and U-181, and sinking 46 merchant ships for a total 225,204 tons in 15 patrols, including one of 205 days, the second longest of the war. In January 1944 Lüth took command of the 22nd U-boat Flotilla, before being appointed commander of the Naval Academy Mürwik in July. Lüth was mistakenly shot and killed by a German sentry on 13 May 1945. | |
| Karl-Friedrich Merten | 5 | 27 | 170,151 | Merten (1905–1993) commanded U-68 on five patrols in 1941–42. He commanded the 26th U-boat Flotilla in early 1943, and this and other training appointments curtailed his operational career. | |
| Karl-Heinz Moehle | 10 | 21 | 92,086 | Moehle (1910-1996) commissioned U-20 in October 1937, and in six wartime patrols, sank eight ships. In May 1940, he commissioned U-123 and in four patrols, sank another 16. From June 1941 Moehle commanded both the 5th U-boat Flotilla and the U-boat base at Kiel. In June 1945, he was arrested and later tried for passing on the Laconia Order. Sentenced to five years imprisonment, he was released in November 1949. | |
| Johann Mohr † | 6 | 27 | 129,976 | Mohr (1916–1943) assumed command of U-124 in September 1941, sinking four ships of Convoy ONS 92 on the night of 12 May 1942, totalling 21,784 tons. Mohr was killed when U-124 was sunk with all hands on 2 April 1943 west of Porto, Portugal, by the British corvette HMS Stonecrop and the sloop HMS Black Swan. | |
| Rolf Mützelburg | 8 | 19 | 81,961 | Mützelburg (1913–1942) served aboard U-100 under Joachim Schepke before commissioning U-203 in February 1941. In eight patrols, he sank 19 ships and damaged three more. On 11 September 1942, during his eighth patrol, Mützelburg was killed in a freak accident; diving off the conning tower into the sea southwest of the Azores, he struck the hull when the U-boat suddenly lurched in the swell. | |
| Victor Oehrn | 4 | 23 | 103,760 | Oehrn (1907–1997) became commander of U-14 in January 1936, patrolling during the Civil War in July–September 1936. In August 1939, he joined the staff of BdU. In May 1940, Oehrn took command of U-37 in order to restore trust in the G7e/T2 torpedo, which had performed abysmally, often detonating prematurely or not at all. In four patrols he sank 23 ships for a total of 103,760 GRT before returning to the staff in August. From November 1941, Oehrn served on the Mediterranean U-boat staff, but during a mission to North Africa in July 1942, he was severely wounded and captured by the British. He was released in a prisoner exchange in October 1943 and returned to Germany. Oehrn spent the remainder of the war serving in several staff positions. | |
| Jürgen Oesten | 13 | 19 | 101,744 | Oesten (1913–2010) commanded U-61, sinking five ships on nine patrols, before commanding U-106 on three patrols and sinking another ten ships. In October 1941, he became commander of the 9th U-boat Flotilla, based in Brest, France. In March 1942, Oesten joined the staff of FdU Nordmeer, directing the U-boat war in Arctic waters, but returned to U-boat duty in September 1943, sailing U-861 to Penang to join the Monsun Gruppe, and sinking another four ships. U-861 left Soerabaya, Dutch East Indies, in January 1945 and reached Trondheim, Norway, in April, just before the German surrender. Oesten was the technical advisor for the 2005 submarine simulator Silent Hunter III. | |
| Adolf Piening | 9 | 25 | 126,664 | Piening (1910–1984) took command of U-155 in June 1941. From March 1944 Piening was the commander of the 7th U-boat Flotilla. Piening's last patrol was in April 1945, laying mines off Saint-Nazaire in U-255. In 1956, he rejoined the Bundesmarine, serving for 13 years. | |
| Fritz Poske | 4 | 16 | 85,299 | Poske (1904–1984) commissioned U-504 in July 1941, despite not having been either a 1WO ("second-in-command") or a Kommandantenschüler ("commander-in-training"). In January 1943, he became the commander of the 1st ULD (1. Unterseeboots-Lehr-Division), and in the last months of the war was chief of the Special Staff for Marine Infantry. In 1951, he rejoined the Seegrenzschutz, which later became the Bundesmarine, retiring in 1963 with the rank of Kapitän zur See. | |
| Günther Prien † | 10 | 30 | 162,769 | Prien (1908–1941) was given command of U-47 in December 1938. His most famous exploit was infiltrating the British Home Fleet's base at Scapa Flow in October 1939 and sinking the battleship HMS Royal Oak, which won him the Knight's Cross of the Iron Cross, the first U-boat commander so honored. Prien was lost when U-47 went missing on 7 March 1941 during an attack on Convoy OB 293 south of Iceland. He was given the nickname "The Ace of Aces". | Günther Prien |
| Wilhelm Rollmann † | 8 | 22 | 101,519 | Rollmann (1907–1943) took command of U-34 in October 1938. After seven successful patrols, Rollmann became an instructor in 2. Unterseeboots-Lehr-Division ("2nd U-boat Training Division"). He commissioned U-848 in February 1943, sailing on one patrol on 1 August 1943 and sinking one ship of 4,573 tons. Rollmann and his crew were killed on 5 November 1943 when U-848 was sunk by US aircraft south-west of Ascension in the mid-Atlantic. | |
| Jürgen von Rosenstiel † | 4 | 14 | 78,843 | Rosenstiel (1912–1942) commanded U-502. On his fourth patrol, on 5 July 1942 U-502 was sunk by a British Wellington bomber in the Bay of Biscay. All of the crew were killed. | |
| Erwin Rostin † | 2 | 17 | 101,321 | Rostin (1907–1942) sailed on his first war patrol as commander of U-158 in February 1942, and sank four ships for a total of 29,234 tons off the US east coast. His second patrol began in May 1942 and was one of the most successful patrols of the war, with 12 ships sunk for a total of 62,536 tons. Rostin and his crew were killed on 30 June 1942 when U-158 was sunk by a United States Navy Mariner bomber. | |
| Joachim Schepke † | 14 | 36 | 153,677 | Schepke (1912–1941) took command of U-3 in 1938, sailed on five combat patrols, and sank two ships. From January to April 1940 he commanded U-19, sinking another nine ships. After a brief spell serving in a staff position, Schepke took command of U-100 in which he sank another 25 ships. On 17 March 1941, while attacking Convoy HX 112 U-100 was forced to the surface by depth charges from HMS Walker and HMS Vanoc, detected on radar, and consequently rammed by Vanoc. Schepke and 37 crewmen were killed; only six were rescued. | |
| Georg Schewe | 10 | 16 | 85,779 | Schewe (1909–1990) commanded U-60 from July 1939, but in six patrols sank only one ship. He did better in U-105, which he commissioned in August 1940, and in four patrols sank a further 15 ships, 12 of them in a single patrol. In February 1942, he joined the staff of FdU Mittelmeer ("Commander-in-Chief of U-boats in the Mediterranean"), remaining there until briefly taking command of 33rd U-boat Flotilla in September 1944. He served on the OKM ("Naval High Command") from October 1944. | |
| Adalbert Schnee | 12 | 23 | 95,889 | Schnee (1913–1982) commanded U-6, U-60, U-201 in 11 patrols, sinking 21 merchant ships totalling 90,189 tons, and damaging three others. He also sank two British auxiliary warships, Springbank and Laertes. After serving on the BdU staff from October 1942, Schnee took command of the Type XXI U-2511, in September 1944, sailing on only a single short patrol between 3 and 6 May 1945 before surrendering. | |
| Klaus Scholtz | 8 | 25 | 128,190 | Scholtz (1908–1987) commanded U-108 from October 1940. In October 1942, he formed and took command of the 12th U-boat Flotilla at Bordeaux. In August 1944, he attempted to lead his men back to Germany on foot, but they were captured by American forces, and he spent the next 18 months in captivity. Scholtz served in the Bundesgrenzschutz-See ("Federal Border Guard") from 1953 to 1956, then transferred to the Bundesmarine, serving as commander of several naval bases, including Kiel, Cuxhaven, and Wilhelmshaven. | |
| Herbert Schultze | 9 | 26 | 169,709 | Schultze (1909–1987) commissioned U-48 in 1939. He took command of the 3rd U-boat Flotilla in July 1941, then joined the staff of Marinegruppe Nord in March 1942. In December 1942 he was assigned to the staff of Admiral Karl Dönitz. In March 1944 he was assigned to Naval Academy Mürwik, where he remained until the end of the war. In 1956 Schultze joined the Bundesmarine and served in a series of staff positions until 1968. | Herbert Schultze |
| Georg-Wilhelm Schulz | 8 | 19 | 89,886 | Schulz (1906–1986) commanded U-10 from January 1939, sailing on two short combat patrols in late 1939. On his first patrol commanding U-64 in April 1940, his submarine was sunk off Norway. He had more luck with U-124, sailing on five patrols and sinking 19 ships and damaging one. He then commanded the 6th U-boat Flotilla. From October 1943, he served on the staff of the FdU Ausbildungsflottillen ("Commander of Training Flotillas"), and as leader of the Erprobungsgruppe U-Boote ("U-boat Testing Group"). In April–May 1945, he was briefly the commander of 25th U-boat Flotilla. | |
| Viktor Schütze | 7 | 35 | 180,073 | Schütze (1906–1950) commanded U-25 and U-103, sinking 35 merchant ships totalling 180,073 tons, before being appointed commander of the 2nd U-boat Flotilla in August 1941. He became the FdU Ausbildungsflottillen ("Commander of the Training Flotillas") in the Baltic Sea in March 1943. | |
| Reinhard Suhren | 6 | 18 | 95,544 | Suhren (1916-1984) spent a year as I. WO on U-48 under Herbert Schultze, Hans-Rudolf Rösing and Heinrich Bleichrodt, firing torpedoes during surfaced attacks, accounting for 200,000 tons of shipping. He then took command of U-564 in April 1941. In six patrols he sank 18 ships for a total of 95,544 GRT, damaged four, and sank the British corvette HMS Zinnia. In October 1942, he became an instructor in the 2nd U-boat Training Division, and later served in the 27th U-boat Flotilla. Suhren then served as FdU Nordwegen ("Commander-in-Chief of U-boats in Norwegian waters") and from September 1944 the FdU Nordmeer ("C-in-C of U-boats North Sea"). | |
| Erich Topp | 13 | 35 | 197,460 | Topp (1914–2005) commanded U-57 and U-552 in 1940–41. He commanded the tactical training unit 27th U-boat Flotilla from late 1942, and served briefly as commander of the Type XXI Elektroboote U-3010 and U-2513 just before the end of the war. He rejoined the Bundesmarine in 1956, reaching the rank of Konteradmiral before retiring in 1969. | Erich Topp |
| Jürgen Wattenberg | 3 | 14 | 82,027 | Wattenberg (1900–1995) served aboard the pocket battleship Admiral Graf Spee during the Battle of the River Plate, but escaped from internment in Uruguay and returned to Germany in May 1940. He joined the U-boat branch in October 1940, and was one of the oldest U-boat commanders when he commissioned U-162 in September 1941. U-162 was sunk during its third patrol, and Wattenberg was held as a POW in the United States until finally released in early 1946. | |
| Werner Winter | 6 | 15 | 79,302 | Winter (1912–1972) served on U-22 for several months, finally taking command in October 1937, and in late 1939 made two brief and unsuccessful combat patrols. From November 1939, he was attached to the BdU Operations staff, but in July 1941 took command of U-103 from Viktor Schütze. From July 1942, he commanded the 1st U-boat Flotilla, based at Brest, France. He was captured by Allied forces in August 1944. After the war, he served in the Bundesmarine, retiring in March 1970. | |
| Hans Witt | 3 | 19 | 100,773 | Witt (1909–1980) took command of U-161 in 1941 as part of a training flotilla, before transferring to command of U-129 in 1942. Witt sailed on three successful patrols in the western Atlantic and the Caribbean in 1942–43, sinking 19 ships for a total of 100,773 GRT. After a year on the BdU staff, he returned to active duty in 1945 in U-3524, one of the new Type XXI Elektroboote, but sailed on no combat patrols. | |
| Helmut Witte | 4 | 23 | 119,554 | Witte (1915–2005) commissioned U-159 in October 1941. From June 1943, he served in several staff positions. | |
| Robert-Richard Zapp | 5 | 16 | 106,200 | Zapp (1904–1964) served on one patrol in U-46 under Engelbert Endrass, before taking command of U-66 in January 1941. He became commander of the 3rd U-boat Flotilla in June 1942. The flotilla was disbanded in October 1944, and he then commanded Marine Regiment Zapp, defending the U-boat base, until May 1945. | |
