= Emmermann =

Emmermann may refer to:

- Carl Emmermann (1915–1990), German U-boat commander
- 15513 Emmermann, a main-belt asteroid named after Belgian amateur astronomer Axel Emmermann (born 1953)

== See also ==
- Emmelmann, a German surname
