= Naval history of World War II =

At the start of World War II, the Royal Navy was the strongest navy in the world, with the largest number of warships built and with naval bases across the globe. It had over 15 battleships and battlecruisers, 7 aircraft carriers, 66 cruisers, 164 destroyers and 66 submarines. With a massive merchant navy, a third of the world total, the British also dominated shipping. The Royal Navy fought in every theatre from the Atlantic, Mediterranean, freezing Northern routes to Russia and the Pacific Ocean.

Over the course of the war the United States Navy grew tremendously as the United States was faced with a two-front war on the seas. By the end of World War II the U.S. Navy was by far the largest and most powerful navy in the world with 6,768 ships, including 28 aircraft carriers, 23 battleships, 71 escort carriers, 72 cruisers, 232 submarines, 377 destroyers, and thousands of amphibious, supply and auxiliary ships.

== Main navies ==
Naval production during WWII
Country	Aircraft carriers (Note: Figure in parentheses indicates escort carriers built on merchant vessel hulls.)	Battleships (Note: Not including ships built prior to the war)	Cruisers	Destroyers	Convoy escorts	Submarines	Merchant tonnage	Notes
United States	28 (71)	10	72	377	420	232	33,993,230	
British Empire and Commonwealth of Nations	19 (46)	5	57	335	875	264	21,000,000 (1939) - 22,000,000	Canada - includes 434 commissioned vessels including cruisers, destroyers, frigates, corvettes and auxiliaries
Soviet Union		3	7	59	150	218		
Japan	30+12 seaplane tenders including 1-400class submarines	12	52	209	189	213	4,152,361	
Germany	1 Not completed	4	12	17	22	1,140		
Italy	1	3	6	6		28	1,469,606	
Romania		0	0	5	9	8	516,000	
Poland				4		5		

=== United States ===
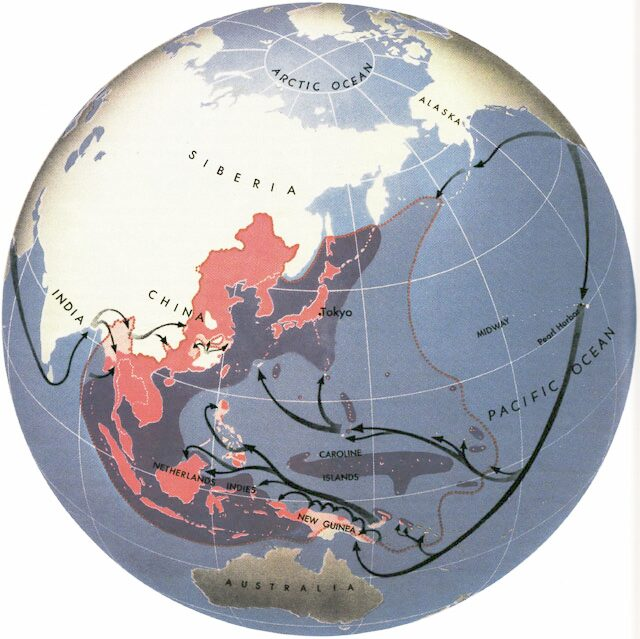
Allied attack routes against Japan

The United States Navy grew rapidly during World War II from 1941 to 1945, and played a central role in the Pacific theatre in the war against Japan. It also played a major supporting role, alongside the Royal Navy, in the European war against Germany.

The Imperial Japanese Navy (IJN) sought naval superiority in the Pacific by sinking the main American battle fleet at Pearl Harbor, which was built around its battleships. The December 1941 surprise attack on Pearl Harbor did knock out the battle fleet, but it did not touch the aircraft carriers, which became the mainstay of the rebuilt fleet.

Naval doctrine had to be changed overnight. The United States Navy (like the IJN) had followed Alfred Thayer Mahan's emphasis on concentrated groups of battleships as the main offensive naval weapons. The loss of the battleships at Pearl Harbor forced Admiral Ernest J. King, the head of the Navy, to place primary emphasis on the small number of aircraft carriers.

The U.S. Navy grew tremendously as it faced a two-front war on the seas. It achieved notable acclaim in the Pacific War, where it was instrumental to the Allies' successful "island hopping" campaign. The U.S. Navy fought five great battles with the Imperial Japanese Navy (IJN): the Battle of the Coral Sea, the Battle of Midway, the Battle of the Philippine Sea, the Battle of Leyte Gulf, and the Battle of Okinawa.

By war's end in 1945, the United States Navy had added thousands of new ships, including 18 aircraft carriers and 8 battleships, and had over 70% of the world's total numbers and total tonnage of naval vessels of 1,000 tons or greater. At its peak, the U.S. Navy was operating 6,768 ships on V-J Day in August 1945, including 28 aircraft carriers, 23 battleships, 71 escort carriers, 72 cruisers, over 232 submarines, 377 destroyers, and thousands of amphibious, supply and auxiliary ships.

==== 1941–1942 ====
The American war plan was Rainbow 5 and was completed on 14 May 1941. It assumed that the United States was allied with Britain and France and provided for offensive operations by American forces in Europe, Africa, or both. The assumptions and plans for Rainbow 5 were discussed extensively in the Plan Dog memo, which concluded ultimately that the United States would adhere to a Europe-first strategy, making the war against Germany a higher priority than the war against Japan. However President Roosevelt did not approve the plan—he wanted to play it by ear. The Navy wanted to make Japan the top target, and in 1941–1943 the U.S. in effect was mostly fighting a naval war against Japan, in addition to its support for Army landings in North Africa, Sicily and Italy in 1942–1943.

U.S. strategy in 1941 was to deter Japan from further advances toward British, Dutch, French and American territories to the south. When the Allies cut off sales of oil to Japan, it lost 90% of its fuel supply for airplanes and warships. It had stocks that would last a year or two. It had to compromise or fight to capture British and Dutch wells to the south. in November 1941, U.S. Army Chief of Staff George Marshall explained the American air war strategy to the press—it was top secret and not for publication:

We are preparing for an offensive war against Japan, whereas the Japs believe we are preparing only to defend the Philippines. ...We have 35 Flying Fortresses already there—the largest concentration anywhere in the world. Twenty more will be added next month, and 60 more in January....If war with the Japanese does come, we'll fight mercilessly. Flying Fortresses will be dispatched immediately to set the paper cities of Japan on fire. There won't be any hesitation about bombing civilians—it will be all-out.

Marshall was talking about long-range B-17 bombers based in the Philippines, which were within range of Tokyo. After Japan captured the Philippines in early 1942, American strategy refocused on a naval war focusing on the capture of islands close enough for the intensive bombing campaign Marshall spoke about. In 1944, the Navy captured Saipan and the Mariana Islands, which were within range of the new B-29 bombers.

After its Pearl Harbor victory in early December, the Imperial Japanese Navy (IJN) seemed unstoppable because it outnumbered and outgunned the disorganized Allies—US, Britain, Netherlands, Australia, and China. London and Washington both believed in Mahanian doctrine, which stressed the need for a unified fleet. However, in contrast to the cooperation achieved by the armies, the Allied navies failed to combine or even coordinate their activities until mid-1942. Tokyo also believed in Mahan, who said command of the seas—achieved by great fleet battles—was the key to sea power. Therefore, the IJN kept its main strike force together under Admiral Yamamoto and won a series of stunning victories over the Americans and British in the 90 days after Pearl Harbor.

Outgunned at sea, with its big guns lying at the bottom of Pearl Harbor, the American strategy for victory required a slow retreat or holding action against the IJN until the much greater industrial potential of the US could be mobilized to launch a fleet capable of projecting Allied power to the enemy heartland.

==== Midway ====
The Battle of Midway, together with the subsequent Guadalcanal campaign, marked the turning point in the Pacific. Between 4–7 June 1942, the U.S. Navy decisively defeated a Japanese naval force that had sought to lure the U.S. carrier fleet into a trap at Midway Atoll. The Japanese fleet lost four aircraft carriers and a heavy cruiser compared to the U.S. Navy's one carrier and a destroyer. After Midway, and the exhausting attrition of the Solomon Islands campaign, Japan's shipbuilding and pilot training programs were unable to keep pace in replacing their losses while the U.S. steadily increased its output in both areas. Military historian John Keegan called the Battle of Midway "the most stunning and decisive blow in the history of naval warfare."

==== Guadalcanal ====
Guadalcanal, fought from August 1942 to February 1943, was the first major Allied offensive of the war in the Pacific Theater. This campaign saw American air, naval and ground forces (later augmented by Australians and New Zealanders) in a six-month campaign slowly overwhelm determined Japanese resistance. Guadalcanal was the key to control the Solomon Islands, which both sides saw as strategically essential. Both sides won some battles but both sides were overextended in terms of supply lines.

The rival navies fought seven battles, with the two sides dividing the victories. They were: Battle of Savo Island, Battle of the Eastern Solomons, Battle of Cape Esperance, Battle of the Santa Cruz Islands, Naval Battle of Guadalcanal, Battle of Tassafaronga and Battle of Rennell Island. Both sides pulled out their aircraft carriers, as they were too vulnerable to land-based aviation.

==== 1943 ====
In preparation of the recapture of the Philippines, the Navy started the Gilbert and Marshall Islands campaign to retake the Gilbert and Marshall Islands from the Japanese in summer 1943. Enormous effort went into recruiting and training sailors and Marines, and building warships, warplanes and support ships in preparation for a thrust across the Pacific, and to support Army operations in the Southwest Pacific, as well as in Europe and North Africa.

In the New Georgia Campaign and the Bougainville Campaign the United States retook the Solomon Islands to the west of Guadalcanal.

==== 1944 ====
The Navy continued its long movement west across the Pacific, seizing one island base after another. Not every Japanese stronghold had to be captured; some, like the big bases at Truk, Rabaul and Formosa, were neutralized by air attack and then simply leapfrogged. The ultimate goal was to get close to Japan itself, then launch massive strategic air attacks and finally an invasion. The US Navy did not seek out the Japanese fleet for a decisive battle, as Mahanian doctrine would suggest; the enemy had to attack to stop the inexorable advance.

The climax of the carrier war came at the Battle of the Philippine Sea. Taking control of islands that could support airfields within B-29 range of Tokyo was the objective. 535 ships began landing 128,000 Army and Marine invaders on 15 June 1944, in the Mariana and Palau Islands. The Japanese launched an ill-coordinated attack on the larger American fleet; its planes operated at extreme ranges and could not keep together, allowing them to be easily shot down in what Americans jokingly called the "Great Marianas Turkey Shoot." Japan had now lost most of its offensive capabilities, and the U.S. had air bases on Guam, Saipan and Tinian for B-29 bombers that targeted Japan's home islands.

The final act of 1944 was the Battle of Leyte Gulf, the last naval battle in history in which the battle line of one navy "crossed the T" of the battle line of its enemy, enabling the crossing line to fire the full broadsides of its main batteries as against only the forward guns of only the enemy's lead ship. The Japanese plan was to lure the main body of the U.S. fleet away from the action at Leyte Gulf by decoying it with a dummy carrier fleet far to the north, and then to close in on the U.S. Army and Marines landing at Leyte with a pincer movement of two squadrons of battleships, and annihilate them. The movements of these Japanese fleet components were terribly uncoordinated, resulting in piecemeal slaughter of Japanese fleet units in the Sibuyan Sea and the Surigao Strait (where "the T was crossed"), but, although the ruse to lure the main body of the U.S. fleet away had worked to perfection, the Japanese were unaware of this, with the result that an overwhelmingly superior remaining force of Japanese battleships and cruisers that massively outnumbered and outgunned the few U.S. fleet units left behind at Leyte, thinking it was sailing into the jaws of the more powerful U.S. main body, disengaged and retreated without exploiting its hard-won advantage. After this battle, Japan lost all its offensive naval capability.

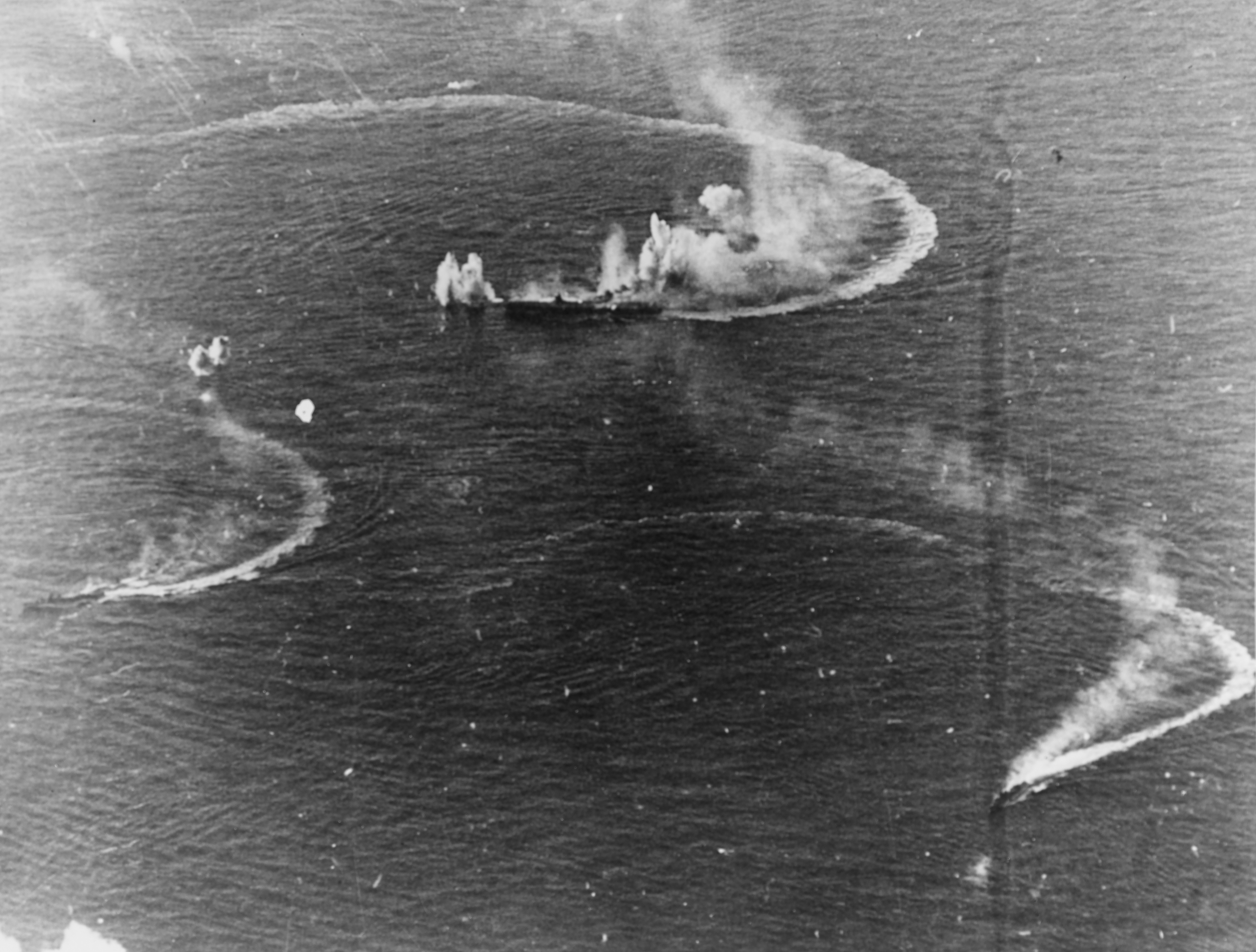
The carrier Zuikaku (center) and two destroyers under attack 20 June 1944

==== Okinawa 1945 ====
Okinawa was the last great battle of the entire war. The goal was to make the island into a staging area for the invasion of Japan scheduled for fall 1945. It was just 350 miles (550 km) south of the Japanese home islands. Marines and soldiers landed on 1 April 1945, to begin an 82-day campaign which became the largest land-sea-air battle in history and was noted for the ferocity of the fighting and the high civilian casualties with over 150,000 Okinawans losing their lives. Japanese kamikaze pilots exacted the largest loss of ships in U.S. naval history with the sinking of 38 and the damaging of another 368. Total U.S. casualties were over 12,500 dead and 38,000 wounded, while the Japanese lost over 110,000 men. The fierce combat and high American losses led the Navy to oppose an invasion of the main islands. An alternative strategy was chosen: using the atomic bomb to induce surrender.

==== Naval technology: US vs Japan ====
Technology and industrial power proved decisive. Japan failed to exploit its early successes before the immense potential power of the Allies could be brought to bear. In 1941 the Japanese Zero fighter had a longer range and better performance than rival American warplanes, and the pilots had more experience in the air. But Japan never improved the Zero and by 1944 the Allied navies were far ahead of Japan in both quantity and quality, and ahead of Germany in quantity and in putting advanced technology to practical use. High tech innovations arrived with dizzying rapidity. Entirely new weapons systems were invented—like the landing ships, such as the 3,000-ton LST ("Landing Ship, Tank") that carried 25 tanks thousands of miles and landed them right on the assault beaches - invented by the British and delivered by industrial capacity of the US. Furthermore, older weapons systems were constantly upgraded and improved. Obsolescent airplanes, for example, received more powerful engines and more sensitive radar sets. One impediment to progress was that admirals who had grown up with great battleships and fast cruisers had a hard time adjusting their war-fighting doctrines to incorporate the capability and flexibility of the rapidly evolving new weapons systems.

The proximity fuze reduced by a factor of 5 to 10 the amount of anti-aircraft shells needed to shoot down a plane. Proximity fuzes were also very effective against troops on the ground.

Radar proved to be an essential technology against ships and aircraft, for detection of the presence of the enemy as well as for fire control.

==== Ships ====
The ships of the American and Japanese forces were closely matched at the beginning of the war. By 1943 the American qualitative edge was winning battles; by 1944 the American quantitative advantage made the Japanese position hopeless. The German navy, distrusting its Japanese ally, ignored Hitler's orders to cooperate and failed to share its expertise in radar and radio. Thus the Imperial Navy was further handicapped in the technological race with the Allies (who did cooperate with each other). The United States economic base was ten times larger than Japan's, and its technological capabilities also significantly greater, and it mobilized engineering skills much more effectively than Japan, so that technological advances came faster and were applied more effectively to weapons. Above all, American admirals adjusted their doctrines of naval warfare to exploit the advantages. The quality and performance of the warships of Japan were initially comparable to those of the US.

The Americans were supremely, and perhaps overly, confident in 1941. Pacific commander Admiral Chester W. Nimitz boasted he could beat a bigger fleet because of "...our superior personnel in resourcefulness and initiative, and the undoubted superiority of much of our equipment." As Willmott notes, it was a dangerous and ill-founded assumption. Nimitz would later make good on his boast by defeating a larger Japanese force in the Battle of Midway and turning the tide in the Pacific War.

==== Battleships ====
The American battleships before Pearl Harbor could fire salvos of nine 2,100-pound armor-piercing shells every minute to a range of 35,000 yards (19 miles). No ship except another battleship had the thick armor that could withstand that kind of firepower. When intelligence reported that Japan had secretly built even more powerful battleships, Washington responded with four Iowa-class battleships. The "big-gun" admirals on both sides dreamed of a great shootout at twenty-mile (32 km) range, in which carrier planes would be used only for spotting the mighty guns. Their doctrine was utterly out of date. A plane like the Grumman TBF Avenger could drop a 2,000-pound bomb on a battleship at a range of hundreds of miles. An aircraft carrier cost less, required about the same number of personnel, was just as fast, and could easily sink a battleship. During the war the battleships found new missions: they were platforms holding all together dozens of anti-aircraft guns and eight or nine 14-inch or 16-inch long-range guns used to blast land targets before amphibious landings. Their smaller 5-inch guns, and the 4,800 3-inch to 8-inch guns on cruisers and destroyers also proved effective at bombarding landing zones. After a short bombardment of Tarawa island in November 1943, Marines discovered that the Japanese defenders were surviving in underground shelters. It then became routine doctrine to thoroughly work over beaches with thousands of high-explosive and armor-piercing shells. The bombardment would destroy some fixed emplacements and kill some troops. More important, it severed communication lines, stunned and demoralized the defenders, and gave the landing parties fresh confidence. After the landing, naval gunfire directed by ground observers would target any enemy pillboxes that were still operational. The sinking of the battleships at Pearl Harbor proved a blessing in deep disguise, for after they were resurrected and assigned their new mission they performed well. (Absent Pearl Harbor, big-gun admirals like Raymond Spruance might have followed prewar doctrine and sought a surface battle in which the Japanese would have been very hard to defeat.)

==== Naval aviation ====
In World War I the US Navy explored aviation, both land-based and carrier based. However, the Navy nearly abolished aviation in 1919 when Admiral William S. Benson, the reactionary Chief of Naval Operations, could not "conceive of any use the fleet will ever have for aviation", and he secretly tried to abolish the Navy's Aviation Division. Assistant Secretary of the Navy Franklin D. Roosevelt reversed the decision because he believed aviation might someday be "the principal factor" at sea with missions to bomb enemy warships, scout enemy fleets, map minefields, and escort convoys. Grudgingly allowing it a minor mission, the Navy slowly built up its aviation. In 1929 it had one carrier (USS Langley), 500 pilots and 900 planes; by 1937 it had 5 carriers (the Lexington, Saratoga, Ranger, Yorktown and Enterprise), 2000 pilots and 1000 much better planes. With Roosevelt now in the White House, the tempo soon quickened. One of the main relief agencies, the Public Works Administration, made building warships a priority. In 1941 the U.S. Navy with 8 carriers, 4,500 pilots and 3,400 planes had more air power than the Japanese Navy.

=== Nazi Germany ===
==== Submarines ====
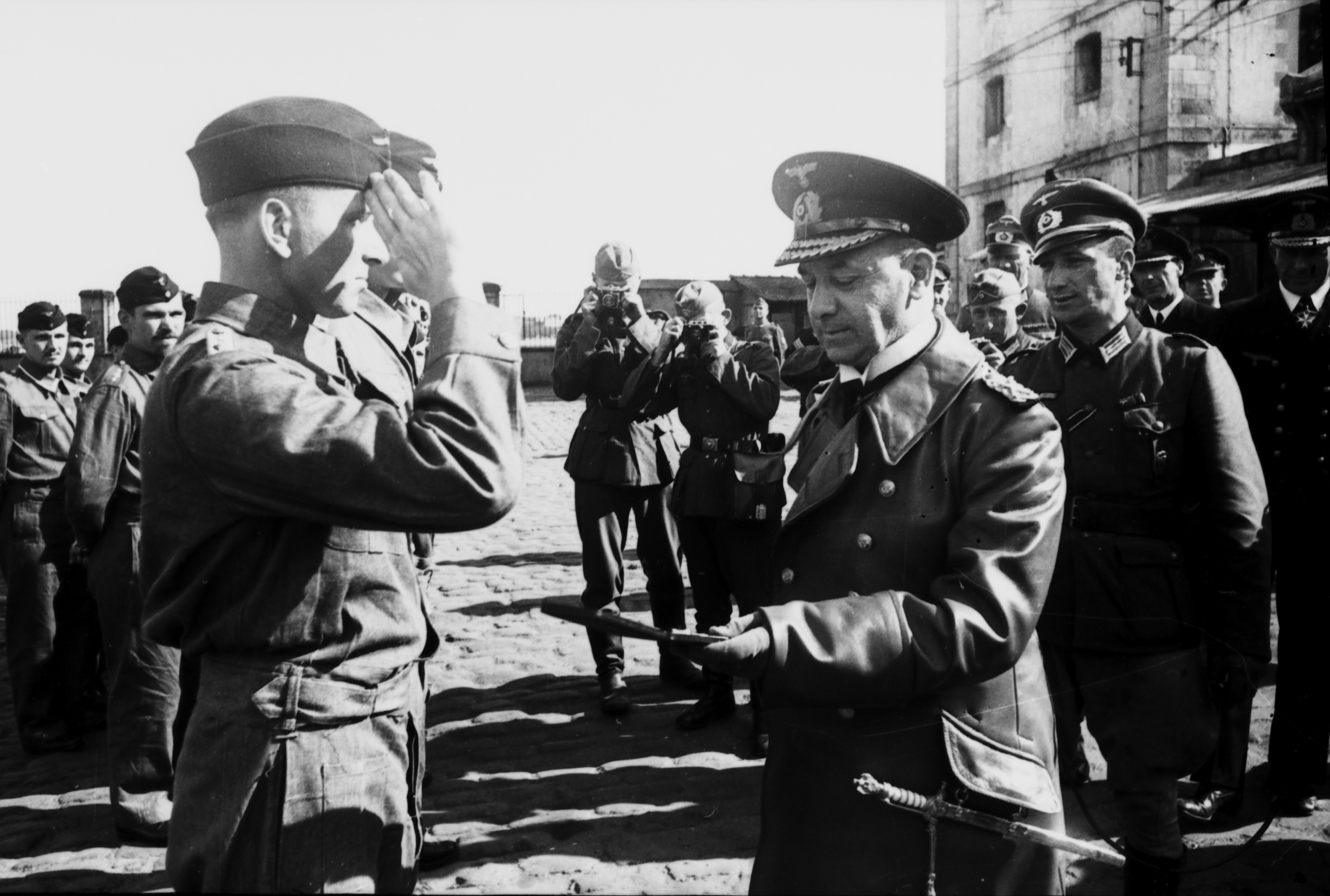
Otto Kretschmer (left) was the most successful German U-boat commander in the World War II

Germany's main naval weapon was the U-boat; its main mission was to cut off the flow of supplies and munitions reaching Britain by sea. Submarine attacks on Britain's vital maritime supply routes in the "Battle of the Atlantic" started immediately at the outbreak of war. Although they were hampered initially by the lack of well-placed ports from which to operate, that changed when France fell in 1940 and Germany took control of all the ports in France and the Low Countries. The U-boats had such a high success rate at first that the period to early 1941 was known as the First Happy Time. The Kriegsmarine was responsible for coastal artillery protecting major ports and possible invasion points, and also handled anti-aircraft batteries protecting major ports.

In 1939–1945 German shipyards launched 1,162 U-boats, of which 785 were destroyed during the war (632 at sea) along with the loss of 30,000 crew. The British anti-submarine ships and aircraft accounted for over 500 kills. At the end of the war, 156 U-boats surrendered to the Allies, while the crews scuttled 221 others, chiefly in German ports. In terms of effectiveness, German and other Axis submarines sank 2828 merchant ships totaling 14.7 million tons (11.7 million British); many more were damaged. The use of convoys dramatically reduced the number of sinkings, but convoys made for slow movement and long delays at both ends, and thus reduced the flow of Allied goods. German submarines also sank 175 Allied warships, mostly British, with 52,000 Royal Navy sailors killed.

==== Surface fleet ====
The German fleet was involved in many operations, starting with the Invasion of Poland. Also in 1939, it sank the British aircraft carrier HMS Courageous and the battleship HMS Royal Oak, while losing the Admiral Graf Spee at the Battle of the River Plate.

In April 1940, the German navy was heavily involved in the invasion of Norway, where it lost the heavy cruiser Blücher, two light cruisers, and ten destroyers. In return it sank the British aircraft carrier HMS Glorious and some smaller ships.

=== United Kingdom ===
At the start of the war, the Royal Navy was the largest navy in the world. In the critical years 1939–43 it was under the command of First Sea Lord Admiral Sir Dudley Pound (1877–1943). As a result of the earlier changes the Royal Navy entered the Second World War as a heterogeneous force of World War I veterans, inter-war ships limited by close adherence to treaty restrictions and later unrestricted designs. Though smaller and relatively older than it was during World War I, it remained the major naval power up until 1944-45 when it was overtaken by the American navy.

At the start of World War II, Britain's global commitments were reflected in the Navy's deployment. Its first task remained the protection of trade, since Britain was heavily dependent upon imports of food and raw materials, and the global empire was also interdependent. The navy's assets were allocated between various fleets and stations.

Station / fleet	Area of responsibility
Home Fleet	Home waters, i.e., North-East Atlantic, Irish Sea, North Sea, English Channel (sub-divided into commands and sub-commands)
Mediterranean Fleet	Mediterranean Sea
South Atlantic Station and Cape of Good Hope Station	South Atlantic and South African region
America and West Indies Station	Western North Atlantic, Caribbean Sea, Eastern Pacific
East Indies Station / Eastern Fleet	Indian Ocean (excluding South Atlantic and Africa Station, Australian waters and waters adjacent to Dutch East Indies)
China Station / Eastern Fleet	North-west Pacific and waters around Dutch East Indies

There are sharply divided opinions of Pound's leadership. His greatest achievement was his successful campaign against German U-boat activity and the winning of the Battle of the Atlantic. Winston Churchill, the civilian head of the Navy (1939–40) and of all the forces as Prime Minister (1940–45), worked with him closely on naval strategies; he was dubbed "Churchill's anchor". He blocked Churchill's scheme of sending a battle fleet into the Baltic early in the war. However his judgment has been challenged regarding his micromanagement, the failed Norwegian Campaign in 1940, his dismissal of Admiral Dudley North in 1940, Japan's sinking of the Repulse and the Prince of Wales by air attack off Malaya in late 1941, and the failure in July 1942 to disperse Convoy PQ 17 under German attack.

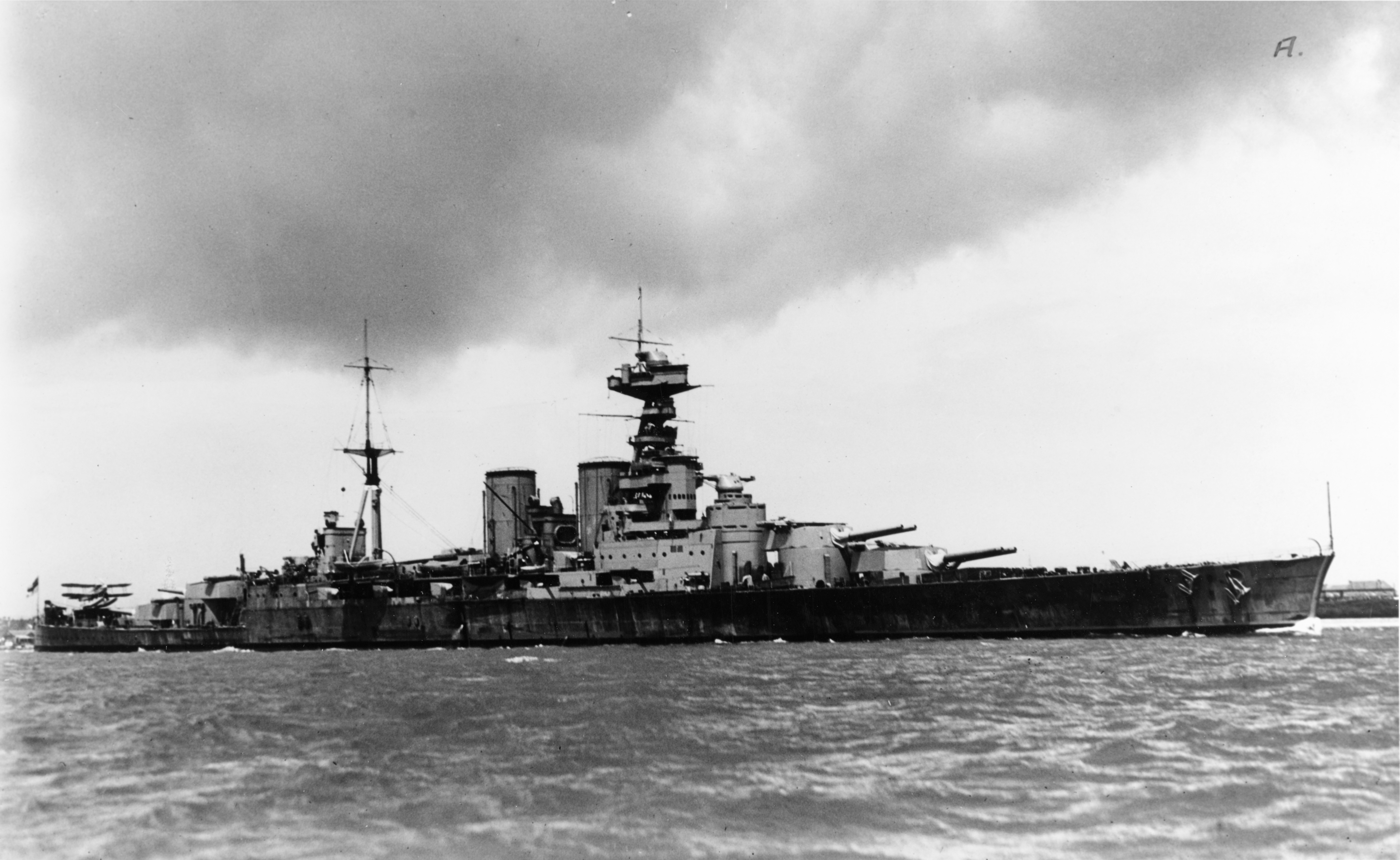
British battlecruiser HMS Hood

During the early phases of World War II, the Royal Navy provided critical cover during British evacuations from Norway (where an aircraft carrier and 6 destroyers were lost but 338,000 men were evacuated), from Dunkirk (where 7,000 RN men were killed) and at the Battle of Crete. In the latter operation Admiral Cunningham ran great risks to extract the Army, and saved many men to fight another day. The prestige of the Navy suffered a severe blow when the battlecruiser Hood was sunk by the German battleship Bismarck in May 1941. Although the Bismarck was sunk a few days later, public pride in the Royal Navy was severely damaged as a result of the loss of the "mighty Hood". The RN carried out a bombardment of Oran in Algeria against the French Mediterranean Fleet. In the attack on Taranto, torpedo bombers sank three Italian battleships in their naval base at Taranto, and in March 1941 it sank three cruisers and two destroyers at Cape Matapan. The RN carried out an evacuation of troops from Greece to Crete and then from that island. In this the navy lost three cruisers and six destroyers but rescued 30,000 men.

The RN was vital in interdicting Axis supplies to North Africa and in the resupply of its base in Malta. The losses in Operation Pedestal were high but the convoy got through.

The Royal Navy was also vital in guarding the sea lanes that enabled British forces to fight in remote parts of the world such as North Africa, the Mediterranean and the Far East. Convoys were used from the start of the war and anti-submarine hunting patrols used. From 1942, responsibility for the protection of Atlantic convoys was divided between the various allied navies: the Royal Navy being responsible for much of the North Atlantic and Arctic oceans. Suppression of the U-boat threat was an essential requirement for the invasion of northern Europe: the necessary armies could not otherwise be transported and resupplied. During this period the Royal Navy acquired many relatively cheap and quickly built escort vessels.

The defence of the ports and harbours and keeping sea-lanes around the coast open was the responsibility of Coastal Forces and the Royal Naval Patrol Service.

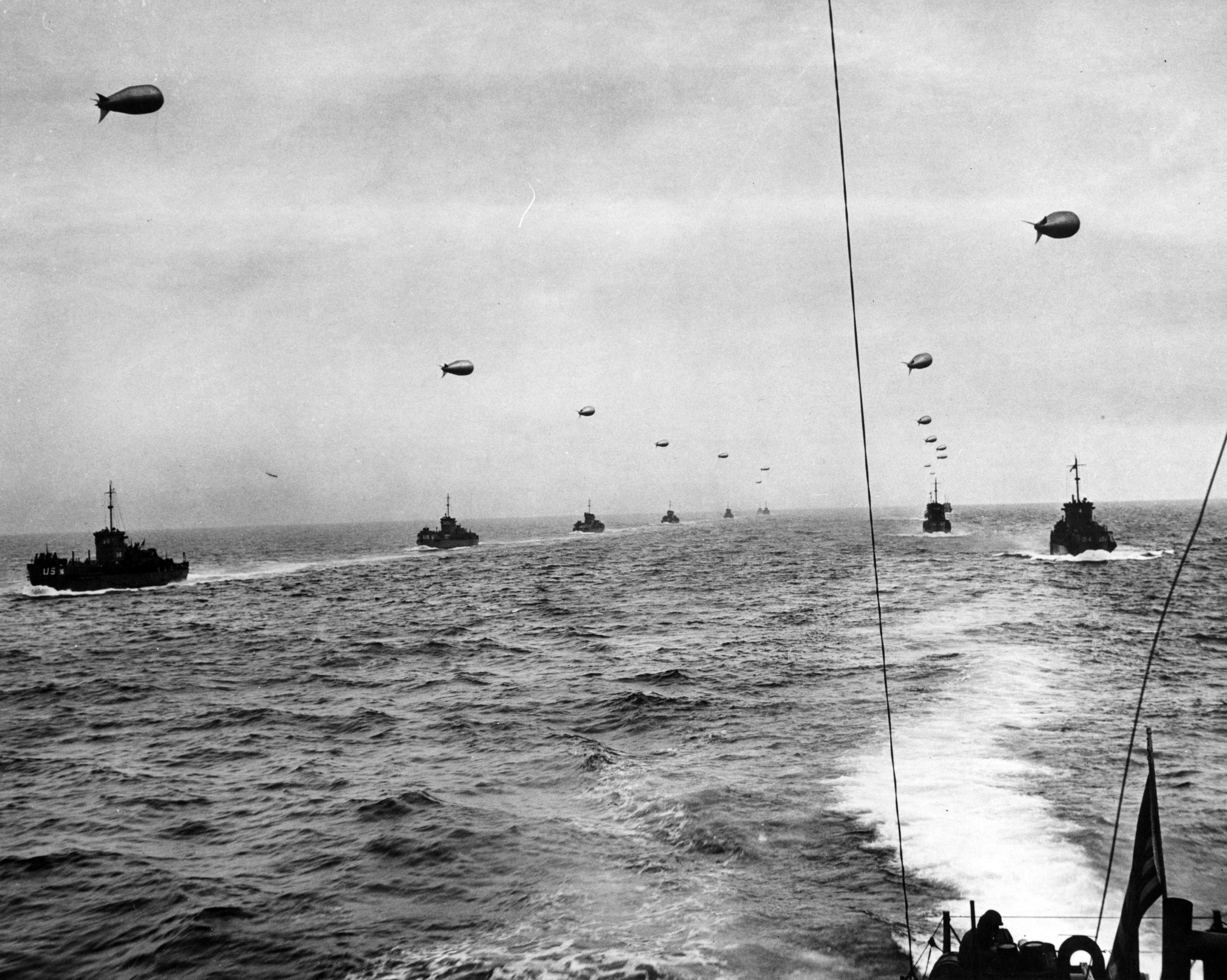
Landing craft convoy crossing the English Channel in 1944

Naval supremacy was vital to the amphibious operations carried out, such as the invasions of Northwest Africa (Operation Torch), Sicily, Italy, and Normandy (Operation Overlord). For Operation Neptune the RN and RCN supplied 958 of the 1213 warships and three quarters of the 4000 landing craft. The use of the Mulberry harbours allowed the invasion forces to be kept resupplied. There were also landings in the south of France in August.

During the war however, it became clear that aircraft carriers were the new capital ship of naval warfare, and that Britain's former naval superiority in terms of battleships had become irrelevant. Britain was an early innovator in aircraft carrier design, introducing armoured flight decks, in place of the now obsolete and vulnerable battleship. The Royal Navy was now dwarfed by its ally, the United States Navy. The successful invasion of Europe reduced the European role of the navy to escorting convoys and providing fire support for troops near the coast as at Walcheren, during the battle of the Scheldt.

The British Eastern Fleet had been withdrawn to East Africa because of Japanese incursions into the Indian Ocean. Despite opposition from the U.S. naval chief, Admiral Ernest King, the Royal Navy sent a large task force to the Pacific (British Pacific Fleet). This required the use of wholly different techniques, requiring a substantial fleet support train, resupply at sea and an emphasis on naval air power and defence. In 1945 84 warships and support vessels were sent to the Pacific. It remains the largest foreign deployment of the Royal Navy. Their largest attack was on the oil refineries in Sumatra to deny Japanese access to supplies. However it also gave cover to the US landings on Okinawa and carried out air attacks and bombardment of the Japanese mainland.

At the start of the Second World War the RN had 15 battleships and battlecruisers with five more battleships under construction, and 66 cruisers with another 23 under construction. To 184 destroyers with 52 more under construction a further 50 old destroyers (and other smaller craft) were obtained from the US in exchange for US access to bases in British territories (Destroyers for Bases Agreement). There were 60 submarines and seven aircraft carriers with more of both under construction. At the end the RN had 16 battleships, 52 carriers—though most of these were small escort or merchant carriers—62 cruisers, 257 destroyers, 131 submarines and 9,000 other ships. During the war the Royal Navy lost 278 major warships and more than 1,000 small ones. There were 200,000 men (including reserves and marines) in the navy at the start of the war, which rose to 939,000 by the end. 51,000 RN sailors were killed and a further 30,000 from the merchant services. The WRNS was reactivated in 1938 and their numbers rose to a peak of 74,000 in 1944. The Royal Marines reached a maximum of 78,000 in 1945, having taken part in all the major landings.

==== Norway campaign, 1940 ====
Finland's defensive war against the Soviet invasion, lasting November 1939 to March 1940, came at a time when there was a lack of large scale military action on the continent called the "Phony War". Attention turned to the Nordic theater. After months of planning at the highest civilian, military and diplomatic levels in London and Paris, in spring, 1940, a series of decisions were made that would involve uninvited invasions of Norway, Sweden, Iceland, and Denmark's Faroe Islands, with the goals of damaging the German war economy and assisting Finland in its war with the Soviet Union. An allied war against the Soviet Union was part of the plan. The main naval launching point would be Royal Navy's base at Scapa Flow in the Orkney Islands. The Soviet invasion of Finland excited widespread outrage at popular and elite levels in support of Finland not only in wartime Britain and France but also in neutral United States. The League of Nations declared the USSR was the aggressor and expelled it. "American opinion makers treated the attack on Finland as dastardly aggression worthy of daily headlines, which thereafter exacerbated attitudes toward Russia." The real Allied goal was economic warfare: cutting off shipments of Swedish iron ore to Germany, which they calculated would seriously weaken German war industry. The British Ministry of Economic Warfare stated that the project against Norway would be likely to cause "An extremely serious repercussion on German industrial output...[and the Swedish component] might well bring German industry to a standstill and would in any case have a profound effect on the duration of the war." The idea was to shift forces away from doing little on the static Western Front into an active role on a new front. The British military leadership by December became enthusiastic supporters when they realized that their first choice, an attack on German oil supplies, would not get approval. Winston Churchill, now head of the Admiralty, pushed hard for an invasion of Norway and Sweden to help the Finns and cut the iron supplies. Likewise the political and military leaders in Paris strongly supported the plan, because it would put their troops in action. The poor performance of the Soviet army against the Finns strengthened the confidence of the Allies that the invasion, and the resulting war with Russia, would be worthwhile. However the civilian leadership of Neville Chamberlain's government in London drew back and postponed invasion plans. Neutral Norway and Sweden refused to cooperate. Finland hoped for Allied intervention but its position became increasingly hopeless; its agreement to an armistice on 13 March signalled defeat. On 20 March, a more aggressive Paul Reynaud became Prime Minister of France and demanded an immediate invasion; Chamberlain and the British cabinet finally agreed and orders were given. However Germany invaded first, quickly conquering Denmark and southern Norway in Operation Weserübung. The Germans successfully repelled the Allied invasion. With the British failure in Norway, London decided it immediately needed to set up naval and air bases in Iceland. Despite Iceland's plea for neutrality, its occupation was seen as a military necessity by London. The Faroe Islands were occupied on 13 April, and the decision made to occupy Iceland on 6 May.

==== German invasion threat 1940 ====
Operation Sea Lion was Germany's threatened invasion across the English channel in 1940. The Germans had the soldiers and the small boats in place, and had far more in the way of tanks and artillery than the British had after their retreat from Dunkirk. However, the Royal Navy and the Royal Air Force were fully prepared, and historians believe that an attempted invasion would be a disaster for the Germans. British naval power, based in Scotland, was very well-equipped with heavily armored battleships; Germany had none available. At no point did Germany have the necessary air superiority. And even if they had achieved air superiority, it would have been meaningless on bad weather days, which would ground warplanes but not hinder the Royal Navy from demolishing the transports and blasting the landing fields. The German general Alfred Jodl realized that as long as the British navy was a factor, an invasion would be to send "my troops into a mincing machine."

==== Collaboration ====
With a wide range of nations collaborating with the Allies, the British needed a way to coordinate the work. The Royal Navy dealt smoothly with the navies-in-exile of Poland, Norway, Netherlands, Belgium, France, Yugoslavia, and Greece using a liaison system between senior naval officers. The system produced the effective integration of Allied navies into Royal Navy commands.

=== France ===
When France fell in June 1940, Germany made French soldiers into POWs but allowed Vichy France to keep its powerful fleet, the fourth largest in the world. France sent its warships to its colonial ports or to ports controlled by Britain. The British fought one of the main squadrons in the attack on Mers-el-Kébir, Algeria (near Oran), on 3 July 1940. The attack killed 1300 men and sank or badly damaged three of the four battleships at anchor. The Vichy government was angry indeed but did not retaliate and maintained a state of armed neutrality in the war. The British seized warships in British harbors, and they eventually became part of the Free French Naval Forces. When Germany occupied all of France in November 1942, Vichy France had assembled at Toulon about a third of the warships it had started with, amounting to 200,000 tons. Germany tried to seize them; the French officers then scuttled their own fleet.

=== Italy ===
The Italian navy ("Regia Marina") had the mission of keeping open the trans Mediterranean to North Africa and the Balkans; it was challenged by the British Royal Navy. It was well behind the British in the latest technology, such as radar, which was essential for night gunnery at long range. The principal units of the Regia Marina upon Italian entry into the war on 10 June 1940 included:

- 6 battleships
- 19 cruisers
- 59 destroyers
- 67 torpedo boats
- 116 submarines

Two aircraft carriers were under construction; they were never launched. The nation was too poor to launch a major shipbuilding campaign, which made the senior commanders cautious for fear of losing assets that could not be replaced. In the Battle of the Mediterranean the British had broken the Italian naval code and knew the times of departure, routing, time of arrival and make up of convoys. The Italians neglected to capture Malta, which became the main staging and logistical base for the British.

=== Japan ===
==== Strength ====
On 7 December 1941, the principal units of the Japanese Navy included:

- 10 battleships (11 by the end of the year)
- 6 fleet carriers
- 4 light fleet carriers
- 18 heavy cruisers
- 18 light cruisers
- 113 destroyers
- 63 submarines

The front-line strength of the Naval Air Forces was 1753 warplanes, including 660 fighters, 330 torpedo bombers, and 240 shore-based bombers. There were also 520 flying boats used for reconnaissance.

==== 1942 IJN Operation ====
In the six months following Pearl Harbor, Admiral Yamamoto's carrier-based fleet engaged in multiple operations ranging from raids on Ceylon in the Indian Ocean to an attempted conquest of Midway Island, west of Hawaii. His actions were largely successful in defeating American, British and Dutch naval forces, although The American fleet held at the battle of Coral Sea, and inflicted a decisive defeat on Yamamoto at Midway. Guam fell in mid-December, and the Philippines were invaded at several points. Wake Island fell on 23 December. January, 1942 saw the IJN handle invasions of the Dutch East Indies, Western New Guinea, and the Solomon Islands. IJN built major forward bases at Truk and Rabaul. The Japanese army captured Manila, Kuala Lumpur and Singapore. Bali and Timor also fell in February. The rapid collapse of Allied resistance had left the American-British-Dutch-Australian Command split in two. At the Battle of the Java Sea, in late February and early March, the IJN inflicted a resounding defeat on the main ABDA naval force, under the Dutch. The Netherlands East Indies campaign subsequently ended with the surrender of Allied forces on Java.

=== Netherlands ===
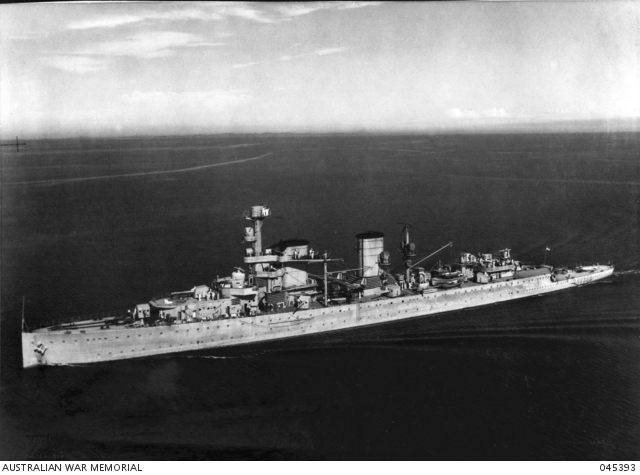
The HNLMS Java in 1941

The small but modern Dutch fleet had as its primary mission the defence of the oil-rich Dutch East Indies. The Netherlands, Britain and the United States tried to defend the colony from the Japanese as it moved south in late 1941 in search of Dutch oil. The Dutch had five cruisers, eight destroyers, 24 submarines, and smaller vessels, along with 50 obsolete aircraft. Most of the forces were lost to Japanese air or sea attacks, with the survivors merged into the British Eastern Fleet. The Dutch navy had suffered from years of underfunding and came ill-prepared to face an enemy with far more and far heavier ships with better weapons, including the Long Lance-torpedo, with which the cruiser Haguro sank the light cruiser HNLMS De Ruyter.

As Germany invaded in April 1940, the government moved into exile in Britain and a few ships along with the headquarters of the Royal Netherlands Navy continued the fight. It maintained units in the Dutch East Indies and, after it was conquered, in Sri Lanka and Western Australia. It was decisively defeated defending the Dutch East Indies in the Battle of the Java Sea. The battle consisted of a series of attempts over a seven-hour period by Admiral Karel Doorman's Combined Striking Force to attack the Japanese invasion convoy; each was rebuffed by the escort force. Doorman went down with his ships together with 1000 of his crew. During the relentless Japanese offensive of February through April 1942 in the Dutch East Indies, the Dutch navy in the Far East was virtually annihilated, and it sustained losses of a total of 20 ships (including its only two light cruisers) and 2500 sailors killed.

A small force of Dutch submarines based in Western Australia sank more Japanese ships in the first weeks of the war than the entire British and American navies together, an exploit which earned Admiral Helfrich the nickname "Ship-a-day Helfrich".

Around the world Dutch naval units were responsible for transporting troops; for example, during Operation Dynamo in Dunkirk and on D-Day, they escorted convoys and attacked enemy targets.

=== USSR ===
Building a Soviet fleet was a national priority, but many senior officers were killed in purges in the late 1930s. The naval share of the national munitions budget fell from 11.5% in 1941 to 6.6% in 1944.

When Germany invaded in 1941 and captured millions of soldiers, many sailors and naval guns were detached to reinforce the Red Army; these reassigned naval forces participated with every major action on the Eastern Front. Soviet naval personnel had especially significant roles on land in the battles for Odessa, Sevastopol, Stalingrad, Novorossiysk, Tuapse (see Battle of the Caucasus), and Leningrad. The Baltic fleet was blockaded in Leningrad and Kronstadt by minefields, but the submarines escaped. The surface fleet fought with the anti-aircraft defence of the city and bombarded German positions. In the Black Sea, many ships were damaged by minefields and Axis aviation, but they helped defend naval bases and supply them while besieged, as well as later evacuating them.

The U.S. and Britain through Lend Lease gave the USSR ships with a total displacement of 810,000 tons.

Although Soviet leaders were reluctant to risk larger vessels after the heavy losses suffered by the Soviet Navy in 1941–2, the Soviet destroyer force was used throughout the war in escort, fire-support and transport roles. Soviet warships, and especially the destroyers, saw action throughout the war in Arctic waters and in the Black Sea. In Arctic waters Soviet destroyers participated in the defense of Allied convoys.

=== Romania ===
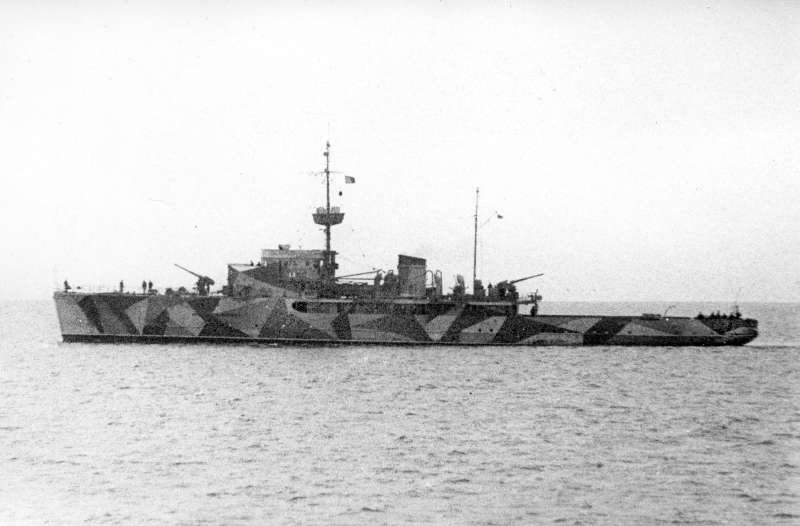
NMS Amiral Murgescu, the most effective Romanian Navy warship of the Second World War

The Romanian Navy was the largest Axis naval force during the naval war in the Black Sea. When the country joined the war in mid-1941, its main force comprised 5 destroyers (two Regele Ferdinand-class and two Mărăști-class plus the sea-going torpedo boat Sborul), 1 submarine (Delfinul), 1 minelaying frigate (Amiral Murgescu), five sea-going monitors (four Mihail Kogălniceanu-class and one Sava-class), three coastguard cruisers (all Bistrița-class), six escort corvettes (four of the French-built Sublocotenent Ghiculescu-class plus the converted torpedo boats Năluca and Smeul). Two more submarines, Marsuinul and Rechinul, were launched a short while prior to Romania's entry into the war, but they were commissioned only in May 1943. Also acquired in 1943 were five Italian CB-class midget submarines. By May 1944, two Romanian motor torpedo boats (Viscolul and Vedenia) were fitted for escort service.

The Romanian Navy was the only navy to fight for over three years without losing a single unit of its main force of destroyers and submarines. At the same time, it caused the sinking of one destroyer and over a dozen submarines, all Soviet.

== Battles and campaigns ==
- Blockade of Germany (1939–1945)

=== Atlantic ===
- Baltic Sea campaigns (1939–45)
- Battle of the Atlantic
- Commerce raiding
- Merchant raiders
- Operation Sea Lion
- Battle of the Mediterranean
- Black Sea Campaigns (1941–44)
  - Romanian Navy during World War II

=== Mediterranean ===
While the Royal Navy spent a great deal of energy dealing with German surface and submarine attacks on its merchant marine, it also launched its own attack on Axis shipping, especially in the Mediterranean. The British sank 3082 Axis merchantmen in the Mediterranean, amounting to over 4 million tons. The loss of supplies proved fatal to the Axis armies in North Africa.

=== Pacific ===
==== Submarine war in Pacific ====
Allied submarines, operating from bases in Australia, Hawaii, and Ceylon, played a major role in defeating Japan. Japanese submarines, however, played a minimal role, although they had the best torpedoes of any nation in World War II, and quite good submarines. The difference in results is due to the very different doctrines of the sides.

===== Allied doctrine and equipment =====
Allied submarines concentrated on destroying Japanese logistics, for which the island nation depended on shipping. Within hours of Pearl Harbor, Roosevelt ordered a new doctrine into effect: unrestricted submarine warfare against Japan. This meant sinking any warship, commercial vessel, or passenger ship in Axis controlled waters, without warning and without help to survivors. U.S. torpedoes, the standard issue Mark XIV torpedo and its Mark VI exploder were both defective, problems not corrected until September 1943. Worst of all, before the war, an uninformed Customs officer had seized a copy of the Japanese merchant marine code (called the "maru code" in the USN), not knowing U.S. communications intelligence had broken it; Japan promptly changed it, and it was not recovered until 1943.

Thus it was not until 1944 the U.S. Navy learned to use its 150 submarines to maximum effect: effective shipboard radar installed, commanders seen to be lacking in aggression replaced, and faults in torpedoes fixed.

===== Japanese doctrine and equipment =====
For the Imperial Japanese Navy, however, submarines, as part of the Japanese warrior tradition of bushido, preferred to attack warships rather than transports. Faced with a convoy, an Allied submarine would try to sink the merchant vessels, while their Japanese counterparts would give first priority to the escorts. This was important in 1942, before Allied warship production came up to capacity. So, while the U.S. had an unusually long supply line between its west coast and frontline areas that was vulnerable to submarine attack, Japan's submarines were instead used for long range reconnaissance and to supply food for the scores of thousands of soldiers stranded on strongholds which had been cut off, especially Truk and Rabaul.

Supply runs were a lesser drain on Allied resources. The need to supply MacArthur's forces trapped in the Philippines led to diversion of boats to "guerrilla submarine" missions. As well, basing in Australia placed boats under Japanese aerial threat while en route to patrol areas, inhibiting effectiveness, and Nimitz relied on submarines for close surveillance of enemy bases. A small number of oversized submarines handled much of the resupply, submarines that were less agile than their sisters attacking escorted convoys.

Requirements of the Japanese Army to supply cut-off garrisons by submarine further reduced the effectiveness of Japanese anti-shipping warfare. In addition, Japan honored its neutrality treaty with the Soviet Union, and ignored U.S. freighters shipping millions of tons of war supplies from San Francisco over northern routes to Vladivostok.

A small number of Allied submarines—less than 2 percent of the fleet tonnage—strangled Japan by sinking its merchant fleet, intercepting many troop transports, and cutting off nearly all the oil imports that were essential to warfare. By early 1945 the oil tanks were dry.

===== Results =====
The Japanese commercial fleet was 6.4 million tons in December 1941; during the war 3.9 million tons of new shipping was built. Japanese merchant losses came to 8.9 million tons, leaving 1.5 million tons afloat at the end of the war. Although estimates differ, U.S. submarines alone probably accounted for 56% of the Japanese merchantmen sunk; most of the rest were hit by planes at the end of the war, or were destroyed by mines. U.S. submariners also claimed 28% of Japanese warships destroyed. Furthermore, they played important reconnaissance roles, as at the battles of the Philippine Sea and Leyte Gulf, when they gave accurate and timely warning of the approach of the Japanese fleet. Submarines operated from secure bases in Fremantle, Australia; Pearl Harbor; Trincomalee, Ceylon; and later Guam. These had to be protected by surface fleets and aircraft.

Japanese anti-submarine practices were careless and badly managed. Japanese convoys were poorly organized and defended compared to Allied ones, a product of flawed IJN doctrine and training. The number of U.S. submarines on patrol at any one time increased from 13 in 1942, to 18 in 1943, to 43 in late 1944. Half of their kills came in 1944, when over 200 subs were operating. By 1945, patrols had decreased because so few targets dared to move on the high seas. In all, Allied submarines destroyed 1,200 merchant ships. Most were small cargo carriers, but 124 were tankers bringing desperately needed oil from the East Indies. Another 320 were passenger ships and troop transports. At critical stages of the Guadalcanal, Saipan, and Leyte campaigns, thousands of Japanese troops were killed before they could be landed. Over 200 warships were sunk, ranging from many auxiliaries and destroyers to eight carriers and one battleship.

Underwater warfare was especially dangerous for the submarine crews. The U.S. submarine service included only 1.6% of Navy personnel or 50,000 men. Most were shore based. Of the 16,000 who went out on patrol, 3,500 (22%) never returned, the highest casualty rate of any American force in World War II. The Japanese losses were even worse.

== Fleets overview ==
=== Allied Powers and Co-belligerents ===
Royal Navy

United States Navy

Royal Canadian Navy

Royal Indian Navy

Royal Australian Navy

Royal New Zealand Navy

South African Naval Service (later renamed Seaward Defence Force (SDF))

Royal Netherlands Navy

Free French Naval Forces

Soviet Navy

Royal Hellenic Navy

Polish Navy

Brazilian Navy

Chilean Navy

Turkish Naval Forces

=== Axis Powers and Co-belligerents ===
Kriegsmarine

Regia Marina

Imperial Japanese Navy

Imperial Japanese Army (distinct from the navy)

Finnish Navy

Romanian Navy during World War II

Royal Thai Navy

Bulgarian Navy

=== Neutral Powers ===
Swedish Navy

Spanish Navy

== See also ==
- Air warfare of World War II
- Naval warfare of World War I

== Bibliography ==
- Bertke, Donald A. et al. World War II Sea War (5 vol. 2011–13 in progress) excerpt and text search vol 5; 500pp each; includes warships and civilian ships from Allied, Axis, and neutral nations. Data is organized by month, then by geographical area, then by date.
- Dear, Ian and M.R.D. Foot, eds. The Oxford companion to world war II (1995), comprehensive encyclopedia
- Rohwer, Jürgen, and Gerhard Hümmelchen. Chronology of the War at Sea, 1939–1945: The Naval History of World War Two (Naval Institute Press, 2005)
- Tucker, Spencer C. (2011). World War II at Sea: An Encyclopedia. ABC-CLIO. ISBN 9781598844580., comprehensive naval encyclopedia
- Symonds, Craig L. World War II at Sea: A Global History (2018), 770pp

=== Pacific ===
- Adams, John A. If Mahan Ran the Great Pacific War: An Analysis of World War II Naval Strategy (Indiana UP, 2008)
- Blair Jr., Clay. Silent Victory. Philadelphia: Lippincott, 1975 (submarine war).
- Boyd, Andrew. The Royal Navy in Eastern Waters: Linchpin of Victory 1935–1942 (Seaforth Publishing, 2017) complete text dissertation version, 2 vol., 2015.
- Boyd, Carl, and Akihiko Yoshida. The Japanese Submarine Force and World War II (1995)
- Carpenter, Ronald H. "Admiral Mahan, 'narrative fidelity,' and the Japanese attack on Pearl Harbor." Quarterly Journal of Speech (1986) 72#3 pp: 290–305.
- Dull, Paul S. Battle History of the Imperial Japanese Navy, 1941–45 (1978).
- Dunnigan, James F., and Albert A. Nofi. The Pacific War Encyclopedia. Facts on File, 1998. 2 vols. 772p.
- Evans, David C; Peattie, Mark R (1997). Kaigun: strategy, tactics, and technology in the Imperial Japanese Navy, 1887–1941. Naval Institute Press. ISBN 0-87021-192-7.
- Evans, David C., ed. The Japanese Navy in World War II (2017); 17 essays by Japanese scholars.
- Ford, Douglas. The elusive enemy: US naval intelligence and the imperial Japanese fleet. (Naval Institute Press, 2011).
- Gailey, Harry A. The War in the Pacific: From Pearl Harbor to Tokyo Bay (1995) online
- Hopkins, William B. The Pacific War: The Strategy, Politics, and Players that Won the War (2010)
- Inoguchi, Rikihei, Tadashi Nakajima, and Robert Pineau. The Divine Wind. Ballantine, 1958. Kamikaze.
- Kirby, S. Woodburn The War Against Japan. 4 vols. London: H.M.S.O., 1957–1965. Official Royal Navy history.
- L, Klemen (2000). "Forgotten Campaign: The Dutch East Indies Campaign 1941–1942". Archived from the original on 26 July 2011.
- Marder, Arthur. Old Friends, New Enemies: The Royal Navy and the Imperial Japanese Navy, vol. 2: The Pacific War, 1942–1945 (1990)
- Miller, Edward S. (2007). War Plan Orange: The U.S. Strategy to Defeat Japan, 1897–1945. US Naval Institute Press. ISBN 978-1-59114-500-4.
- Morison, Samuel Eliot, History of United States Naval Operations in World War II. Vol. 3, The Rising Sun in the Pacific. Boston: Little, Brown, 1961; Vol. 4, Coral Sea, Midway and Submarine Actions. 1949; Vol. 5, The Struggle for Guadalcanal. 1949; Vol. 6, Breaking the Bismarcks Barrier. 1950; Vol. 7, Aleutians, Gilberts, and Marshalls. 1951; Vol. 8, New Guinea and the Marianas. 1962; Vol. 12, Leyte. 1958; vol. 13, The Liberation of the Philippines: Luzon, Mindanao, the Visayas. 1959; Vol. 14, Victory in the Pacific. 1961.
  - Morison, Samuel Eliot. The Two-Ocean War: A Short History of the United States Navy in the Second World War (2007)
- Okumiya, Masatake, and Mitso Fuchida. Midway: The Battle That Doomed Japan. Naval Institute Press, 1955.
- Prange, Gordon W., Donald Goldstein, and Katherine Dillon. At Dawn We Slept. Penguin, 1982. Pearl Harbor
- Prange, Gordon W., Donald Goldstein, and Katherine Dillon. Miracle at Midway. Penguin, 1982.
- Prange, Gordon W., Donald Goldstein, and Katherine Dillon. Pearl Harbor: The Verdict of History.
- Smith, J. Douglas, and Richard Jensen. World War II on the Web: A Guide to the Very Best Sites. (2002)
- Spector, Ronald. Eagle Against the Sun: The American War with Japan Free Press, 1985.
- Thomas, David Arthur. The battle of the Java sea (Deutsch, 1968)
- Toland, John, The Rising Sun. 2 vols. Random House, 1970. Japan's war.
- Toll, Ian W. Pacific Crucible: War at Sea in the Pacific, 1941–1942 (2011)
- Van der Vat, Dan. The Pacific Campaign: The Second World War: the US-Japanese Naval War (1941–1945) (1992).
- Willmott, H. P. Empires in the Balance. Annapolis: United States Naval Institute Press, 1982.
- Willmott, H. P. The Barrier and the Javelin. (Naval Institute Press, 1983).
- Willmott, H. P. The Last Century of Sea Power, vol. 2: From Washington to Tokyo, 1922–1945. (Indiana University Press, 2010). 679 pp.
- Wood, James B. Japanese Military Strategy in the Pacific War: Was Defeat Inevitable? (Rowman & Littlefield, 2007)
- Y'Blood, William. Red Sun Setting: The Battle of the Philippine Sea. Annapolis, Maryland: Naval Institute Press, 1980.

==== Historiography ====
- Barlow, Jeffrey G. "American and Allied Strategy and Campaigns in the Pacific War, 1941–1945." in Loyd Lee, ed. World War II in Asia and the Pacific and the War's Aftermath, with General Themes: A Handbook of Literature and Research (1998): pp 72–89 historiography.
- Peattie, Mark R. "Japanese Strategy and Campaigns in the Pacific War, 1941–1945." in Loyd Lee, ed. World War II In Asia and the Pacific and the War's Aftermath, with General Themes: A Handbook of Literature and Research (1998): pp56–71; historiography.

=== Atlantic and Mediterranean ===
- Barnett, Corelli. Engage the Enemy More Closely: The Royal Navy in the Second World War (1991)
- Bennett, George Henry, and Ralph Bennett. Survivors: British Merchant Seamen in the Second World War (Hambledon Press, 1999)
- Blair, Clay Jr. (1996), Hitler's U-Boat War: The Hunters 1939–1942, Cassell & Co.
- Blair, Clay Jr. (1996), Hitler's U-Boat War: The Hunted 1942–1945, Cassell & Co.
- Costello, John; Hughes, Terry (1977), The Battle of the Atlantic, London: Collins, OCLC 464381083
- Douglas, William A.B., Roger Sarty and Michael Whitby, No Higher Purpose: The Official Operational History of the Royal Canadian Navy in the Second World War, 1939–1943, (2 vol 2002–2007)
- Gardner, Jock. "The battle of the Atlantic, 1941‐the first turning point?." Journal of Strategic Studies (1994) 17#1 pp: 109–123.
- Greene, Jack, and Alessandro Massignani. The naval war in the Mediterranean, 1940–1943 (1998)
- Ireland, Bernard (2003), Battle of the Atlantic, Barnsley, UK: Pen & Sword Books, ISBN 1-84415-001-1.
- Koburger, Charles W. (1993). Naval Warfare in the Eastern Mediterranean, 1940–1945. Westport, CT: Praeger Publishers. Archived from the original on 10 November 2012 – via Questia.
- Morison, Samuel Eliot. History of United States Naval Operation in World War II in 15 Volumes (1947–62, often reprinted). vol 1 The Battle of the Atlantic, September 1939 – May 1943; vol 2 Operations in North African Waters, October 1942 – June 1943; vol 9. Sicily – Salerno – Anzio, January 1943 – June 1944; vol 10. The Atlantic Battle Won, May 1943 – May 1945; vol 11 The Invasion of France and Germany, 1944–1945
  - Morison, Samuel Eliot. The Two-Ocean War: A Short History of the United States Navy in the Second World War (2007), condensed version
- Offley, Edward. Turning the Tide: How a Small Band of Allied Sailors Defeated the U-boats and Won the Battle of the Atlantic (Basic Books, 2011)
- O'Hara, Vincent P. The German Fleet at War, 1939–1945 (Naval Institute Press, 2004)
- Paterson, Lawrence. U-boats in the Mediterranean, 1941–1944. (Naval Institute Press, 2007)
- Rodger, N. A. M. Command of the Ocean: A Naval History of Britain, Volume 3: 1815–1945 (2009)
- Roskill, S. W. War at Sea 1939–1945, Volume 1: The Defensive London: HMSO, 1954; War at Sea 1939–1945, Volume 2: The Period of Balance, 1956; War at Sea 1939–1945, Volume 3: The Offensive, Part 1, 1960; War at Sea 1939–1945, Volume 3: The Offensive, Part 2, 1961. online part of vol 1; online vol 2
  - Roskill, S. W. The White Ensign: British Navy at War, 1939–1945 (1960). summary
- Runyan, Timothy J., and Jan M. Copes, eds. To die gallantly: the battle of the Atlantic (Westview Press, 1994)
- Sarty, Roger, The Battle of the Atlantic: The Royal Canadian Navy's Greatest Campaign, 1939–1945, (CEF Books, Ottawa, 2001)
- Syrett, David. The Defeat of the German U-Boats: The Battle of the Atlantic (U of South Carolina Press, 1994.)
- Terraine, John, Business in Great Waters, (London 1987) The best single-volume study of the U-Boat Campaigns, 1917–1945
- Tomblin, Barbara Brooks (2004). With Utmost Spirit: Allied Naval Operations in the Mediterranean, 1942–1945. Lexington, KY: University Press of Kentucky. Archived from the original on 20 February 2018 – via Questia.
- Tomblin, Barbara Brooks. "The Naval War in the Mediterranean." in A Companion to World War II (2013): 222+
- Vat, Dan van der. The Atlantic Campaign (1988)

=== Ships and technology ===
- Bath, Alan Harris. Tracking the Axis enemy: The triumph of Anglo-American naval intelligence (University Press of Kansas, 1998)
- Campbell, N. J. M. Naval Weapons of World War Two (2002), covers major navies of the world
- Friedman, Norman. U.S. Naval Weapons: Every Gun, Missile, Mine and Torpedo Used by the U.S. Navy from 1883 to the Present Day (1983)
- Goralski, Robert, and Russell W. Freeburg. Oil and War: How the Deadly Struggle for Fuel in WWII Meant Victory or Defeat (Morrow, 1987)
- Jane's Fighting Ships of World War II (1972); covers major navies of the world
- Levy, James P. "Race for the Decisive Weapon: British, American, and Japanese Carrier Fleets, 1942–1943." Naval War College Review (Winter 2005) v 58
- Newpower, Anthony. Iron Men and Tin Fish: The Race to Build a Better Torpedo During World War II (Greenwood, 2006)
- US Office of the Chief of Naval Operations. ONI-204 German Naval Vessels 13 August 1942 online
- U.S. Office of Naval Intelligence, Publications online

=== Admirals ===
- Agawa, Hiroyuki. The reluctant admiral: Yamamoto and the Imperial Navy (1979)
- Bird, Keith. Erich Raeder Admiral of the Third Reich (2006)
- Brodhurst, Robin. Churchill's Anchor: Admiral of the Fleet Sir Dudley Pound, OM, GCB, GCVO (Pen & Sword Books, 2000)
- Buell, Thomas. The Quiet Warrior: A Biography of Admiral Raymond Spruance. (1974).
- Buell, Thomas B. Master of Sea Power: A Biography of Fleet Admiral Ernest J. King (Naval Institute Press, 1995). ISBN 1-55750-092-4
- Hoyt, Edwin P. Yamamoto: The Man Who Planned the Attack on Pearl Harbor (2001)
- Larrabee, Eric. Commander in Chief: Franklin Delano Roosevelt, His Lieutenants, and Their War (2004), chapters on all the key American war leaders excerpt and text search
- Murfett, Malcolm. The First Sea Lords from Fisher to Mountbatten (1995), British
- Padfield, Peter. Dönitz: The Last Führer (2001)
- Potter, E. B. Bull Halsey (1985).
- Potter, E. B. Nimitz. (1976).
- Potter, John D. Yamamoto (1967).
- Roskill, Stephen. Churchill and the Admirals (1977).
- Simpson, Michael. Life of Admiral of the Fleet Andrew Cunningham (Routledge, 2004)
- Stephen, Martin. The Fighting Admirals: British Admirals of the Second World War (1991).
- Ugaki, Matome, Donald M. Goldstein, and Katherine V. Dillon. Fading Victory: The Diary of Admiral Matome Ugaki, 1941–1945 (University of Pittsburgh Press, 1991), a primary source
- Wukovits, John. Admiral" Bull" Halsey: The Life and Wars of the Navy's Most Controversial Commander (Macmillan, 2010)
