= German submarine U-64 (1939) =

German World War II submarine

Coordinates: 68°32.9′N 17°33′E

History

Nazi Germany
- Name: U-64
- Ordered: 16 July 1937
- Builder: AG Weser, Bremen
- Yard number: 952
- Laid down: 15 December 1938
- Launched: 20 September 1939
- Commissioned: 16 December 1939
- Fate: Sunk in 13 April 1940 in Norway by a British aircraft; eight dead and 38 survivors

General characteristics
- Class & type: Type IXB submarine
- Displacement: 1,051 t (1,034 long tons) surfaced; 1,178 t (1,159 long tons) submerged
- Length: 76.50 m (251 ft) o/a; 58.75 m (192 ft 9 in) pressure hull
- Beam: 6.76 m (22 ft 2 in) o/a; 4.40 m (14 ft 5 in) pressure hull
- Height: 9.60 m (31 ft 6 in)
- Draught: 4.70 m (15 ft 5 in)
- Speed: 18.2 knots (33.7 km/h; 20.9 mph) surfaced; 7.3 knots (13.5 km/h; 8.4 mph) submerged
- Range: 12,000 nmi (22,000 km; 14,000 mi) at 10 knots (19 km/h; 12 mph) surfaced; 64 nmi (119 km; 74 mi) at 4 knots (7.4 km/h; 4.6 mph) submerged
- Armament: 6 × torpedo tubes (4 bow, 2 stern); 22 × 53.3 cm (21 in) torpedoes; 1 × 10.5 cm (4.1 in) SK C/32 deck gun (180 rounds); 1 × 3.7 cm (1.5 in) SK C/30 AA gun; 1 × twin 2 cm FlaK 30 AA guns

Service record
- Part of: 2nd U-boat Flotilla; 16 December 1939 – 13 April 1940
- Identification codes: M 00 412
- Commanders: Kptlt. Georg-Wilhelm Schulz; 16 December 1939 – 13 April 1940
- Operations: 1 patrol: 6 – 13 April 1940
- Victories: None

German submarine U-64 was a Type IXB U-boat of Nazi Germany's Kriegsmarine during World War II. She was ordered by them in July 1937. Her keel was laid down by AG Weser in Bremen in December 1938. Following about nine months of construction, she was launched in September 1939 and formally commissioned into the Kriegsmarine in December.

U-64 had a very short career and sank no enemy vessels. Having left her home port of Wilhelmshaven for her first war patrol on 6 April 1940, she was intercepted by Allied aircraft seven days later off the coast of Norway during the invasion of that country and was sunk by a bomb from a Fairey Swordfish aircraft of HMS Warspite (03). Of her crew of 46, eight men died and 38 escaped from the sinking submarine.

== Construction and design ==
=== Construction ===
U-64 was ordered by the Kriegsmarine on 16 July 1937 as part of Plan Z and in violation of the Treaty of Versailles. Her keel was laid down on 15 December 1938 by AG Weser in Bremen as yard number 952. She was launched on 20 September 1939 and commissioned on 16 December under the command of Kapitänleutnant Georg-Wilhelm Schulz.

=== Design ===
Type IXB submarines were slightly larger than the original Type IX submarines, later designated IXA. U-64 had a displacement of 1,051 tonnes (1,034 long tons) when at the surface and 1,178 tonnes (1,159 long tons) while submerged. The U-boat had a total length of 76.50 m (251 ft), a pressure hull length of 58.75 m (192 ft 9 in), a beam of 6.76 m (22 ft 2 in), a height of 9.60 m (31 ft 6 in), and a draught of 4.70 m (15 ft 5 in). The submarine was powered by two MAN M 9 V 40/46 supercharged four-stroke, nine-cylinder diesel engines producing a total of 4,400 metric horsepower (3,240 kW; 4,340 shp) for use while surfaced, two Siemens-Schuckert 2 GU 345/34 double-acting electric motors producing a total of 1,000 metric horsepower (740 kW; 990 shp) for use while submerged. She had two shafts and two 1.92 m (6 ft) propellers. The boat was capable of operating at depths of up to 230 metres (750 ft).

The submarine had a maximum surface speed of 18.2 knots (33.7 km/h; 20.9 mph) and a maximum submerged speed of 7.3 knots (13.5 km/h; 8.4 mph). When submerged, the boat could operate for 64 nautical miles (119 km; 74 mi) at 4 knots (7.4 km/h; 4.6 mph); when surfaced, she could travel 12,000 nautical miles (22,000 km; 14,000 mi) at 10 knots (19 km/h; 12 mph). U-64 was fitted with six 53.3 cm (21 in) torpedo tubes (four fitted at the bow and two at the stern), 22 torpedoes, one 10.5 cm (4.13 in) SK C/32 naval gun, 180 rounds, and a 3.7 cm (1.5 in) SK C/30 as well as a 2 cm (0.79 in) C/30 anti-aircraft gun. The boat had a complement of forty-eight.

== Service history ==
U-64 went to sea on 6 April 1940. For eight days, she roamed the North Sea in search of Allied convoys heading to Norway in support of the campaign centred around that country. During that time she encountered no enemy vessels. On 13 April, the eighth day of her first patrol, she was hove-to in Herjangsfjord in Norway, around 50 yards from the shore; the crew were repairing a minor problem with the submarine's periscope.

However a strong British force was approaching the area. This consisted of the battleship HMS Warspite (03) and nine destroyers. Their intention was to attack a group of eight German destroyers that were nearby - this action would later be known as the Second Battle of Narvik.

Just before the battle, a Fairey Swordfish float-plane was launched from Warspite, with the crew ordered to reconnoitre for German ships and to bomb any targets of opportunity. The aircraft was carrying two 250-pound (110 kg) high explosive bombs, two 100-pound (45 kg) anti-submarine bombs and eight 40-pound (18 kg) anti-personnel bombs. After spotting and reporting several of the German destroyers, the crew spotted the U-64 and decided to attack. They dived down to 200 feet (60 m) and dropped their anti-submarine bombs. One was a near-miss, but one bomb hit just behind the submarine's conning-tower. Anti-aircraft fire from the U-boat caused minor damage to the aircraft.

The U-boat sank to the bottom of the fjord. Eight crew went down with her but 38 escaped. They were picked up by German mountain troops stationed ashore and would later form the crew of U-124.

The wreck of the U-64 was raised in August 1957 and moved to Sandnessjøen in Norway, where it was scrapped.

== Bibliography ==
- Busch, Rainer; Röll, Hans-Joachim (1999). German U-boat commanders of World War II : a biographical dictionary. Translated by Brooks, Geoffrey. London, Annapolis, Md: Greenhill Books, Naval Institute Press. ISBN 1-55750-186-6.
- Busch, Rainer; Röll, Hans-Joachim (1999). Der U-Boot-Krieg, 1939-1945: Deutsche U-Boot-Verluste von September 1939 bis Mai 1945 [German U-boat losses from September 1939 to May 1945] (in German). Vol. IV. Hamburg, Berlin, Bonn: Mittler. ISBN 3-8132-0514-2.
- Gröner, Eric; Jung, Dieter; Maass, Martin (1991). German Warships 1815-1945: U-boats and Mine Warfare Vessels. Vol. 2. Translated by Thomas, Keith; Magowan, Rachel. London: Conway Maritime Press. ISBN 0-85177-593-4.
- Kemp, Paul (1999). U-Boats Destroyed - German Submarine Losses in the World Wars. London: Arms & Armour. ISBN 1-85409-515-3.
