= 25th U-boat Flotilla =

25. Unterseebootsflottille
- Active: Raised 1941, Dissolved 1945
- Country: Nazi Germany
- Branch: Kriegsmarine
- Type: U-boat flotilla
- Garrison/HQ: Libau, Danzig

Commanders
- Notable commanders: Kapitänleutnant Robert Gysae

25th U-boat Flotilla (German: 25. Unterseebootsflottille) was formed in Danzig in April 1940 as a training flotilla responsible for Firing Training.

It moved bases several times throughout the war. Between June 1941 and September 1941 it moved to Trondheim. Then it was shifted to Memel and subsequently to Libau. At the end of 1944 it was shifted again to Gotenhafen and then finally in 1945 it moved to Travemünde.

The Flotilla was originally called 2. Unterseebootsausbildungsflottille until July 1940 when it was renamed 25. Unterseebootsflottille.

== Flotilla commanders ==
- Korvettenkapitän Ernst Hashagen (Apr 1940-Dec 1941)
- Korvettenkapitän Karl Jasper (Dec 1941-Aug 1943)
- Fregattenkapitän Karl Neitzel (i.V.) (Aug 1943-Dec 1943)
- Korvettenkapitän Robert Gysae (Dec 1943-Apr 1945)
- Korvettenkapitän Georg-Wilhelm Schulz (Apr 1945-8 May 1945)
