= Georg-Wilhelm Schulz =

German World War II U-boat commander (1906–1986)

- Born: 10 March 1906; Cologne, German Empire
- Died: 5 July 1986 (aged 80); Hamburg, West Germany
- Military career
- Allegiance: Nazi Germany
- Branch: Kriegsmarine
- Service years: 1933–1945
- Rank: Korvettenkapitän
- Units: 3rd U-boat Flotilla; 2nd U-boat Flotilla; 6th U-boat Flotilla; FdU Ausbildungsflottillen; 25th U-boat Flotilla
- Commands: U-10, 5 January 1939 – 15 October 1939; U-64, 16 December 1939 – 13 April 1940; U-124, 11 June 1940 – 7 September 1941
- Conflicts: Spanish Civil War; World War II; Norwegian campaign; Battles of Narvik; Battle of the Atlantic; St Nazaire Raid
- Awards: Spanish Cross; Iron Cross 1st Class; U-boat War Badge 1939; Knight's Cross

Georg-Wilhelm Schulz (10 March 1906 – 5 July 1986) was a German U-boat commander of the Second World War. From September 1939 until retiring from front line service in September 1941, he sank 19 ships for a total of 89,885 gross register tons (GRT). For this he received the Knight's Cross, among other commendations.

== Early life ==
Schulz was born on 10 March 1906 in Cologne. He initially entered the merchant marine, eventually spending ten years there, including time spent on sailing ships. He joined the navy in October 1933, initially as HSO, Handelschiffoffizier (merchant ship officer). He moved to the U-boat arm on 27 September 1935 as an Oberfähnrich zur See, spending the next three and half years training on submarines. During this time he appears to have been amongst those sent to help the Spanish Nationalists during the Spanish Civil War as he was awarded the Spanish Cross on 6 June 1939. He received his first command on 5 January 1939 when he took over U-10. He was promoted to Kapitänleutnant on 1 April 1939 and on the outbreak of war he carried out two short patrols later that year, before leaving U-10 on 15 October.

== Wartime career ==
His next command was U-64, which he took over on 16 December 1939. He took her on her first patrol off the Norwegian coast in April 1940. The patrol was only eight days old when U-64 was detected by a British aircraft on 13 April, whilst hove-to 50 yards off-shore in Herjangsfjord near Narvik. The crew were repairing a minor problem with the periscope.

The aircraft was a Fairey Swordfish scouting float-plane that had been launched from the battleship HMS Warspite. The Swordfish dived down to 200 feet (60 m) and dropped two 100-pound (45 kg) anti-submarine bombs. One was a near-miss, but one hit just behind the submarine's conning-tower. Anti-aircraft fire from the U-boat caused minor damage to the aircraft. U-64 was sunk, killing eight of the crew; thirty-eight survivors, including Schulz, managed to escape to be rescued by German mountain troops.

Two months later Schulz took over command of U-124, with the other U-64 survivors forming the bulk of her crew. His greatest success was on his fourth patrol, where he sank 11 ships for a total of 52,379 tons, whilst also having damaged two other merchants. He was awarded the Iron Cross 1st Class on 25 September 1940, and the Knight's Cross on 4 April 1941. He stepped down as commander of U-124 on 7 September 1941, handing over to Johann Mohr. During this time several later successful U-boat captains had served under Schulz, including Mohr, Reinhard Hardegen and Werner Henke.

Schulz then took over as commander of 6th U-boat Flotilla, initially based in Danzig, and later in Saint-Nazaire. He was promoted to Korvettenkapitän on 1 April 1943, and in October 1943 he was attached to the Staff of the 'FdU Ausbildungsflottillen' (Commander Training flotillas) in Gotenhafen. He spent time here as a staff officer, and also as the leader of the 'Erprobungsgruppe U-Boote' (U-boat testing group). He briefly moved on 22 April 1945 to become the last commander of 25th U-boat Flotilla.

== Postwar ==
Little is known about Schulz's postwar activities. He died in Hamburg on 5 July 1986 at the age of 80.

In 1994 the Köhler Mittler Verlag in Hamburg published his autobiographical account Über dem nassen Abgrund: Als Kommandant und Flottillenchef im U-Boot-Krieg (engl. "Above the Abyss"), which has been reissued in several editions. In 1998 an unauthorized Czech translation has later appeared, titled Ponorkové eso (U-boot ace).

== Awards ==
- Wehrmacht Long Service Award 4th Class (15 October 1937)
- Spanish Cross in Bronze (6 June 1939)
- The Return of Sudetenland Commemorative Medal of 1 October 1938 (1 October 1939)
- Iron Cross (1939)
  - 2nd Class (25 September 1940)
  - 1st Class (25 September 1940)
- U-boat War Badge (1939) (23 December 1939)
- War Merit Cross 2nd Class and 1st Class with Swords (30 January 1945)
- Knight's Cross of the Iron Cross on 4 April 1941 as Kapitänleutnant and commander of U-124

Military offices
Preceded by Korvettenkapitän Werner Hartmann	Commander of the 6th U-boat Flotilla; September 1941 – November 1943	Succeeded by Kapitänleutnant Carl Emmermann
Preceded by Korvettenkapitän Robert Gysae	Commander of the 25th U-boat Flotilla; April 1945 – 8 May 1945	Succeeded by disbanded
