= Robert Gysae =

German U-boat commander

- Born: 14 January 1911; Berlin-Charlottenburg, German Empire
- Died: 26 April 1989 (aged 78); Wilhelmshaven, West Germany
- Military career
- Allegiance: Weimar Republic; Nazi Germany; West Germany
- Branch: Reichsmarine; Kriegsmarine; German Navy
- Service years: 1931–45; 1956–70
- Rank: Korvettenkapitän (Kriegsmarine), Flottillenadmiral (Bundesmarine)
- Commands: U-98; U-177
- Conflicts: Battle of the Atlantic
- Awards: Knight's Cross of the Iron Cross with Oak Leaves

Robert Karl Friedrich Gysae (14 January 1911 – 26 April 1989) was a German U-boat commander in the Kriegsmarine during World War II. He was a recipient of the Knight's Cross of the Iron Cross with Oak Leaves of Nazi Germany. Gysae commanded U-98 and U-177, being credited with sinking twenty-five ships on eight patrols, for a total of 146,815 gross register tons (GRT) of Allied shipping.

== Career ==
Gysae joined the Reichsmarine in 1931 and served on torpedo boats before transferring to the U-Bootwaffe ("U-boat force") in April 1940. In October 1940 he was appointed commander of the Type VIIC U-boat U-98, unusually without serving any time as either 1.WO (1. Wachoffizier, "1st Watch Officer") or Kommandantenschüler ("Commander-in-Training") on any other U-boats. After six patrols in the north Atlantic in command of U-98, in March 1942 he transferred to the Type IXD2 U-boat U-177 for another two patrols, this time operating off South Africa and Portuguese East Africa. He sank a total of 25 ships, including the armed merchant cruiser HMS Salopian.

On 28 November 1942 off the coast of Natal Province, Gysae sank the 6,796 ton British troop ship RMS Nova Scotia with three torpedoes. She was carrying 780 Italians; a mixture of prisoners of war and civilian internees. Gysae rescued two survivors to identify the ship, who turned out to be Italian merchant sailors. Mindful of the Laconia Order issued two months previously, Gysae radioed the BdU, who ordered him to continue his patrol. The BdU notified the Portuguese authorities, who sent the frigate NRP Afonso de Albuquerque from Lourenço Marques to help. Of 1,052 people from the Nova Scotia only 194 survived: 192 rescued by the frigate and two others in subsequent days. 858 were killed, including 650 Italians.

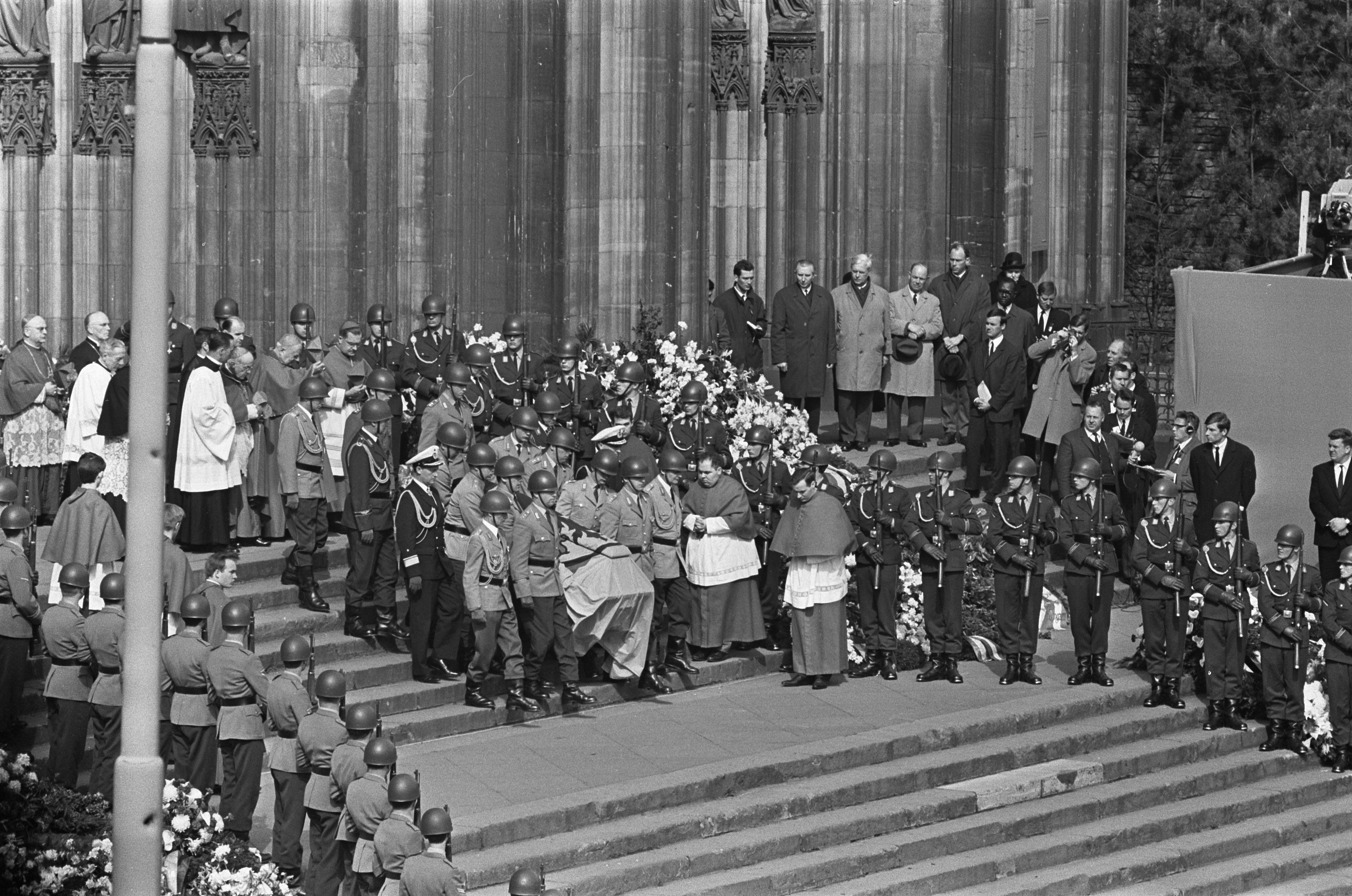
Flottillenadmiral Gysae (wearing a white cap, 2nd person on the left of the coffin) at Konrad Adenauer's funeral.

In January 1944 he became commander of 25th U-boat Flotilla, a training flotilla based at Gotenhafen. In April 1945, during the last month of the war, Gysae commanded the Marinepanzerjagd-Regiment 1, a naval anti-tank regiment. After the war he served in the German Mine Sweeping Administration (Deutscher Minenräumdienst) for more than two years. In 1956 he joined the Bundesmarine, serving for four years as naval attaché in the United States, and then three years as commander of Marinedivision Nordsee with the rank of Flottillenadmiral before retiring in 1970. He died in 1989 aged 78.

== Summary of career ==
During his career Gysae sunk 24 commercial ships for 136,266 GRT, one auxiliary warship of 10,549 GRT, and damaged one ship for 2,588 GRT.

=== Awards ===
- Wehrmacht Long Service Award 4th Class (2 October 1936)
- The Return of Sudetenland Commemorative Medal of 1 October 1938 (20 December 1939)
- Spanish Cross in Bronze with Swords
- Iron Cross (1939)
  - 2nd Class (31 May 1940)
  - 1st Class (15 April 1941)
- Knight's Cross of the Order of the Crown of Italy (11 March 1941)
- U-boat War Badge (1939) (31 May 1941); with Diamonds
- Croce di Guerra with Swords (Italy, 25 May 1943)
- Wound Badge (1939) in Black (25 June 1943)
- War Merit Cross, 2nd Class with Swords (1 September 1944)
- U-boat Front Clasp in Bronze (1 October 1944)
- Knight's Cross of the Iron Cross with Oak Leaves
  - Knight's Cross (31 December 1941) as commander of U-98
  - 250th Oak Leaves (31 May 1943) as commander of U-177
- Legion of Merit (United States of America)
- Officer's Cross, Order of Merit of the Federal Republic of Germany

=== Promotions ===
Kriegsmarine
1 April 1932:	Seekadett (Midshipman)
1 January 1933:	Fähnrich zur See (Officer Cadet)
1 January 1935:	Oberfähnrich zur See (Senior Ensign)
1 April 1935:	Leutnant zur See (Second Lieutenant)
1 January 1937:	Oberleutnant zur See (First Lieutenant)
1 October 1939:	Kapitänleutnant (Captain Lieutenant)
1 July 1943:	Korvettenkapitän (Corvette Captain)
Bundesmarine
7 December 1956	Fregattenkapitän (Frigate Captain)
20 September 1960	Kapitän zur See (Captain at Sea)
13 April 1967	Flottillenadmiral (Flotilla Admiral)

Military offices
Preceded by Fregattenkapitän Karl Neitzel	Commander of the 25th U-boat Flotilla; 5 January 1944 – 21 April 1945	Succeeded by Korvettenkapitän Georg-Wilhelm Schulz
