= 27th U-boat Flotilla =

27. Unterseebootsflottille
- Active: January 1940–March 1945
- Country: Nazi Germany
- Branch: Kriegsmarine
- Type: U-boat flotilla
- Garrison/HQ: Gotenhafen

Commanders
- Notable commanders: FrgKpt. Werner Hartmann; Korvkpt. Erich Topp; Kptlt. Ernst Bauer

27th U-boat Flotilla ("27. Unterseebootsflottille") was a training flotilla ("Ausbildungsflottille") of Nazi Germany's Kriegsmarine during World War II.

The flotilla was founded at Gotenhafen in January 1940 under the command of Korvettenkapitän Ernst Sobe as Taktische Unterseebootsausbildungsflottille ("Tactical U-boat Training Flotilla"), and was redesignated 27. Unterseebootsflottille in June 1940.

This was where new U-boat crews received their tactical training (Taktische Ausbildung Unterseeboote), also taking part in an eight- to fifteen-day tactical exercise (Taktische Übung), a simulated convoy battle in the Baltic Sea. A U-boat might have to take part in more than one exercise, for example U-109 needed two attempts in the spring of 1941, before being declared combat ready. The flotilla was the last training station for new U-boats. It disbanded in March 1945.

== Flotilla commanders ==
- Korvettenkapitän Ernst Sobe (January 1940–December 1941)
- Fregattenkapitan Werner Hartmann (December 1941–October 1942)
- Korvettenkapitän Erich Topp (October 1942–August 1944)
- Kapitänleutnant Ernst Bauer (October 1944–March 1945)

== Assigned U-boats ==
One U-boat was assigned to this flotilla during its service.

- UD-4
