= Emmelmann =

Emmelmann is a German surname. Notable people with the surname include:

- Frank Emmelmann (born 1961), East German sprinter
- Kirsten Emmelmann (born 1961), East German sprinter, wife of Frank

== See also ==
- Emmermann
