= Carl Emmermann =

German U-boat commander

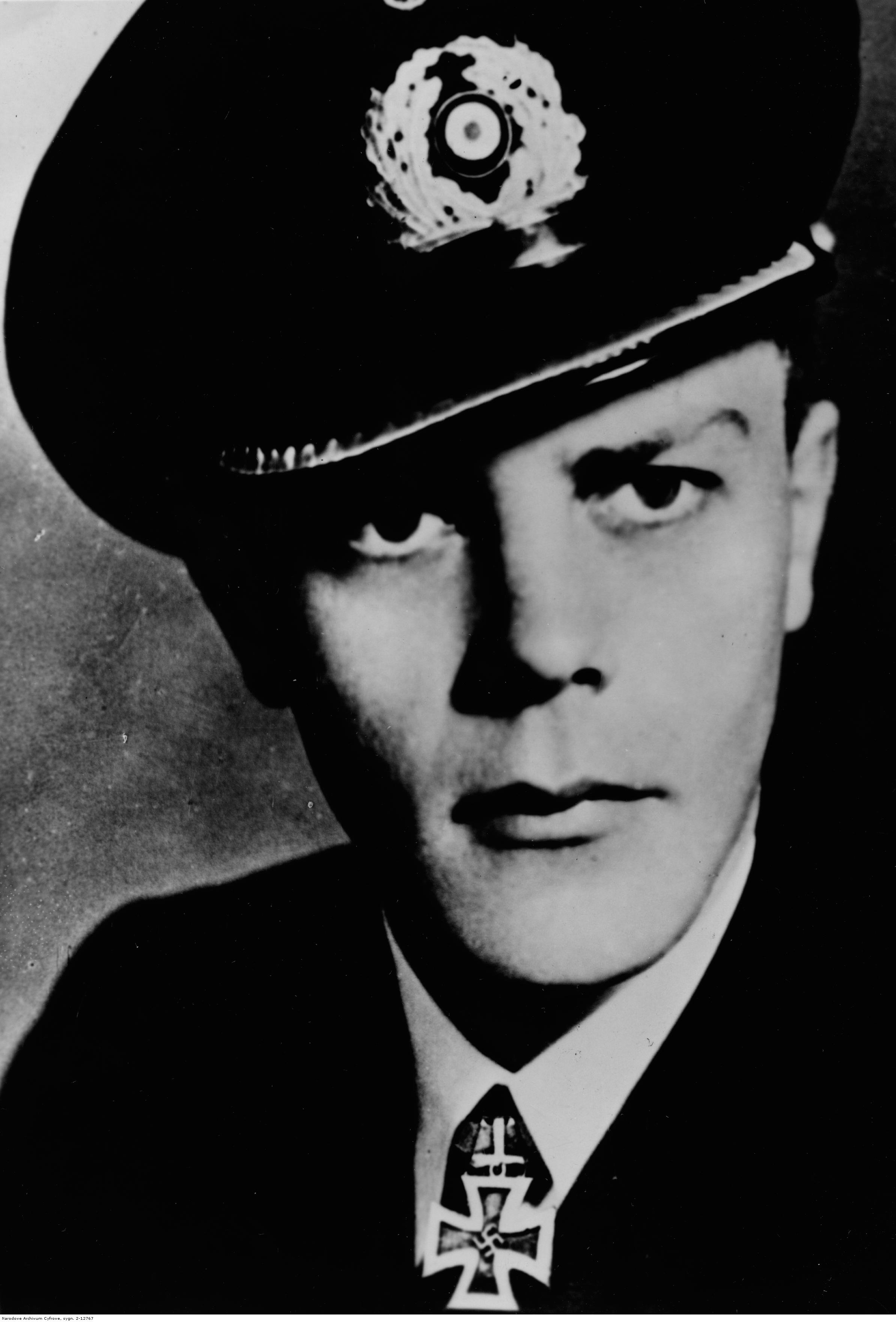
- Carl Emmermann
- Born: 6 March 1915; Hamburg
- Died: 25 March 1990 (aged 75); Celle
- Military career
- Allegiance: Nazi Germany
- Branch: Kriegsmarine
- Service years: 1934–1945
- Rank: Korvettenkapitän
- Units: SSS Gorch Fock light cruiser Karlsruhe; 6th U-boat Flotilla; 10th U-boat Flotilla
- Commands: U-172, 5 November 1941 – 31 October 1943; U-3037, 3 March 1945 – 22 April 1945
- Conflicts: Battle of the Atlantic
- Awards: Knight's Cross of the Iron Cross with Oak Leaves
- Other work: Engineer businessman

Carl Emmermann (6 March 1915 – 25 March 1990) was a German U-boat commander during World War II. In his time as commander, submarines under his command sank 27 ships for a total tonnage of 152,080 gross register tons (GRT).

== Career ==
Emmermann began his naval career in 1934. For some years he was training officer on the Naval Academy Mürwik, where future officers got their training.

In 1939 Emmermann joined the U-boat force and in November 1940 became the first Watch officer on UA under the command of Hans Eckermann. On her first patrol UA only damaged the British steamer SS Empire Attendant.

In November 1941 Emmermann took over his own boat, U-172. He completed five patrols with this boat, in the Caribbean Sea, with the wolf pack Eisbär in South African waters, and in the North and South Atlantic.

His greatest success was the 10 October 1942 sinking of the British liner-troopship SS Orcades. Emmermann sank the SS Benlomond off the coast of Brasil on 23 November 1942. His fifth patrol with U-172 was dramatic, in that the boat brought back half the crew of U-604 which had been so heavily damaged during two air attacks that she had to be scuttled. After that patrol Emmermann became the commander of the 6th U-boat Flotilla in November 1943.

In August 1944 Emmermann became the chief of the Erprobungsgruppe Typ XXIII. There in late 1944 he wrote the battle instructions for the new Type XXIII U-boat.

In March 1945 he was commander of U-3037 for one month, and in the last month of the war he commanded the 31st U-boat Flotilla in Hamburg. Along with some other U-boat men he took part in infantry duty around Hamburg as commander of Marine-Battalion Emmermann.

== Later life ==
Emmermann survived the war and later returned to Germany, studied engineering and prospered in business. He died on 25 March 1990 at the age of 75 in Celle, West Germany.

== Summary of career ==
As commander of U-172, Emmermann is credited with the sinking of 26 merchant ships totaling 152,080 gross register tons (GRT).

=== Awards ===
- Wehrmacht Long Service Award 4th Class (5 April 1938)
- Iron Cross (1939)
  - 2nd Class (19 March 1941)
  - 1st Class (2 August 1941)
- U-boat War Badge (1939) (2 August 1941)
  - with Diamonds (1 October 1943)
- War Merit Cross 2nd Class with Swords (1 September 1944)
- U-boat Front Clasp (1 October 1944)
- Knight's Cross of the Iron Cross with Oak Leaves
  - Knights Cross on 27 November 1942 as Kapitänleutnant and commander of U-172
  - 256th Oak Leaves on 4 July 1943 as Kapitänleutnant and commander of U-172

=== Promotions ===
26 September 1934:	Seekadett (Midshipman)
1 July 1935:	Fähnrich zur See (Officer Cadet)
1 January 1937:	Oberfähnrich zur See (Senior Ensign)
1 April 1937:	Leutnant zur See (Second Lieutenant)
1 April 1939:	Oberleutnant zur See (First Lieutenant)
1 October 1941:	Kapitänleutnant (Captain Lieutenant)
16 July 1943:	Kapitänleutnant (Captain Lieutenant), new rank age dated 1 November 1940
1 December 1944	Korvettenkapitän (Corvette Captain)

Military offices
Preceded by Korvettenkapitän Georg-Wilhelm Schulz	Commander of the 6th U-boat Flotilla; November 1942 – August 1944	Succeeded by disbanded
Preceded by Kapitän zur See Bruno Mahn	Commander of the 31st U-boat Flotilla; April – May 1945	Succeeded by disbanded
