= U18 =

U18 or U-18 may refer to:

- German submarine U-18, various vessels
- Ryan U-18 Navion, an American utility aircraft
- Small nucleolar RNA SNORD18
- Small rhombihexahedron
- U-18 self-propelled gun, a Soviet experimental self-propelled gun
- Under-18 athletics
