= UIS =

UIS may refer to:

- Uis, a village in Erongo Region, Namibia
- Underwater Inspection System, a component of the Underwater Port Security System developed for the United States Coast Guard
- Universal Interactive Studios (now Vivendi Games)
- University of Illinois Springfield, a public four-year university in the United States
- Universidad Industrial de Santander, Colombia
- University of Stavanger, a public research university in Norway
- Union Internationale de Spéléologie, an international umbrella organization for caving and speleology
- Unisys Corporation NYSE stock symbol
- UIs, plural abbreviation of user interface
- Uisai language, ISO 639-3 code
- Umpire Information System, made by QuesTec and used for providing feedback and evaluation of Major League umpires
- UNESCO Institute for Statistics

== See also ==
- UI (disambiguation)
