= German submarine U-142 =

U-142 may refer to one of the following German submarines:

- SM U-142, the lead ship of the Type U 142 submarines; launched in 1918 and that served in the First World War until demilitarized on 11 November 1918; broken up at Oslebshausen in 1919; power plant surrendered to Allies
  - During the First World War, Germany also had this submarine with a similar name:
    - SM UB-142, a Type UB III submarine launched in 1918 and surrendered on 22 November 1918; broken up at Landerneau in July 1921
- German submarine U-142 (1940), a Type IID submarine that served in the Second World War until scuttled on 2 May 1945; wreck broken up at later date
