= U1 =

U1, U.I or U-1 may refer to:

== People ==
- Yuvan Shankar Raja (stage name: U1; born 1979), an Indian musician and film composer

== Character ==
- U-1, a fictional character, the protagonist of the Gitaroo Man video game

== Computing and electronics ==
- U1, a speed class for Secure Digital (SD) cards
- Apple U1, a mobile system-on-a-chip
- Ultima I: The First Age of Darkness, a 1981 video game
- U1 Technology, a video game publisher

== Military ==
- U-1, the USAF and US Military's designation for the De Havilland Canada DHC-3 Otter light transport aircraft
- U-1, Soviet designation for Avro 504 trainer
- Multiple German U-boats named U-1
- Oberursel U.I, an early German aircraft engine
- HDMS U-1, a Danish submarine
- SM U-1, an Austro-Hungarian submarine, lead ship of the U-1 class

== Rail ==
=== Locomotives ===
- LNER Class U1, a 1924 British solitary loco
- SR U1 class, a class of 2-6-0 locos

=== U-Bahn lines ===
- U1 (Berlin U-Bahn)
- U1 (Frankfurt U-Bahn)
- U1 (Hamburg U-Bahn)
- U1 (Munich U-Bahn)
- U1 (Nuremberg U-Bahn)
- U1 (Vienna U-Bahn)

== Other uses ==
- U1, unemployment figure released by Bureau of Labor Statistics
- U(1), in abstract algebra, the unitary group of degree one
- U1 spliceosomal RNA, a small nuclear RNA component of the spliceosome involved in pre-mRNA splicing
- UNIONS 1 (U1), a star cluster of the Milky Way Galaxy
- U1, a definable user mode (like program with preset) on many Nikon DSLRs and MILCs
- London Buses route U1

== See also ==
- UI (disambiguation)
- UL (disambiguation)
- 1U (disambiguation)
- 1 (disambiguation)
- U (disambiguation)
