= U-boat =

German submarine

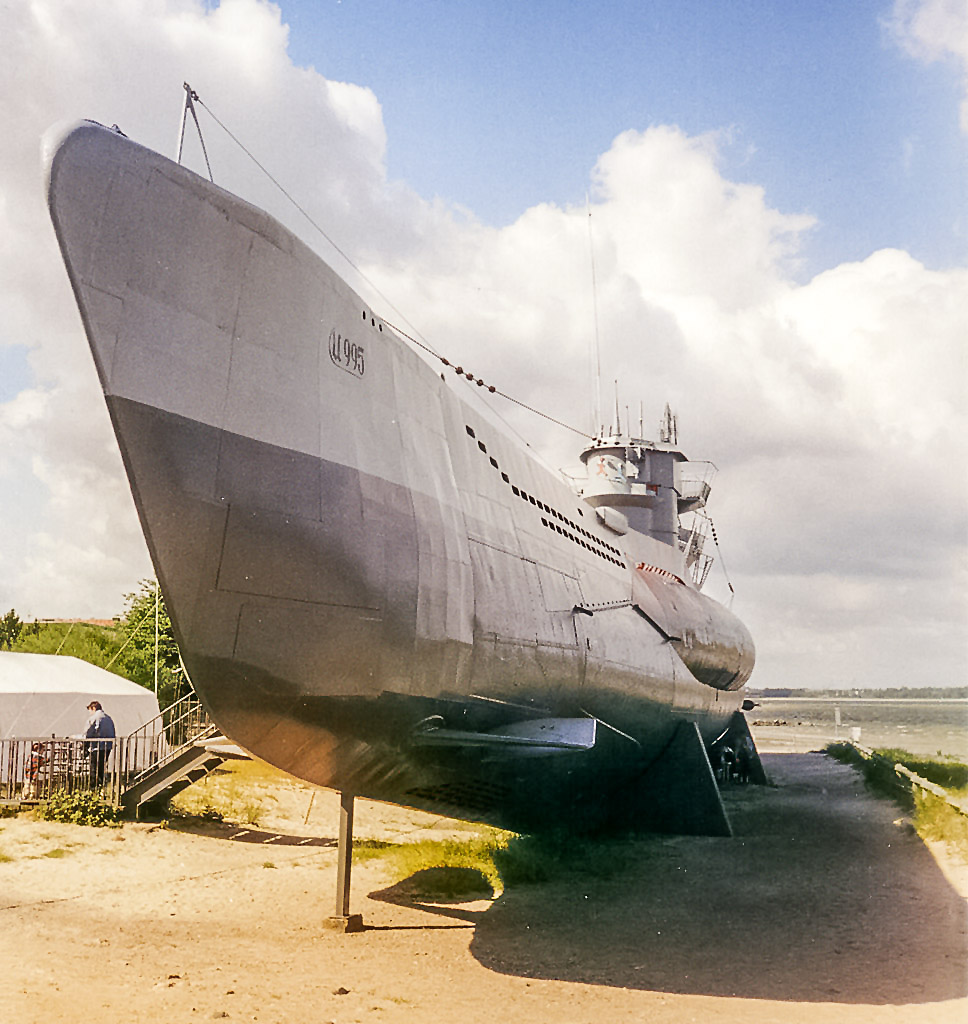
U-995, a typical VIIC/41 U-boat on display at the Laboe Naval Memorial near Kiel, Germany

U-boats are naval submarines operated by Germany, especially during World War I and World War II. The term is an anglicized form of the German word U-Boot [ˈuːboːt], a shortening of Unterseeboot (lit. 'under-sea boat'). Austro-Hungarian Navy submarines were also known as U-boats.

U-boats are especially known for their use in unrestricted submarine warfare in both world wars, attempting to disrupt merchant traffic towards the United Kingdom to force them out of the war. In World War I, Germany intermittently waged unrestricted submarine warfare against the UK: a first campaign in 1915 was abandoned after strong protests from the United States but in February 1917 the Germans, facing deadlock on the continent, saw no other option than to resume the campaign. The renewed campaign failed to achieve its goal mainly because of the introduction of convoys. Instead the campaign ensured final defeat as the campaign was a contributing factor to the entry of the US in World War I.

In World War II, Karl Dönitz, supreme commander of the Kriegsmarine's U-boat arm (Befehlshaber der Unterseeboote), was convinced the UK and its convoys could be defeated by new tactics, and tried to focus on convoy battles. Though U-boat tactics initially saw success in the Battle of the Atlantic, greatly disrupting Allied shipping, improved convoy and anti-submarine tactics such as high-frequency direction finding and the Hedgehog anti-submarine system began to take a toll on the German U-boat force. This ultimately came to a head in May 1943, known as Black May, in which U-boat losses began to outpace their effect on shipping.

== Early U-boats (1850–1914) ==
Construction of submersibles was initiated in Germany in 1848 by the prospect of a conflict with Denmark. German naval officers hoped that the new weapon might give them advantage over the much stronger Danish Navy. The first practical submersile, the three-man Brandtaucher, was designed by Wilhelm Bauer in 1850 and constructed by Schweffel and Howaldt in Kiel. It was lost on 1 February 1851 during a test dive. After the conclusion of the First Schleswig War the interest of the German navy in submersibles quickly petered out. (Note: Brandtaucher ihas been salvaged and is on display at the Bundeswehr Military History Museum, Dresden) Whilst the Russian, French, British, Spanish and American navies were building multiple experimental and operational submarines, and although the various German Navies received 181 submarine projects between 1861 and 1900, only two practical submersiles were built in Germany during that time: In 1867 Otto Vogel built a 5.3 meter submersile which was however lost during trials in the Elbe, and in 1897 a 14 meter submersile was built at the Howaldt Yard in Kiel. These boats had very limited capabilities.

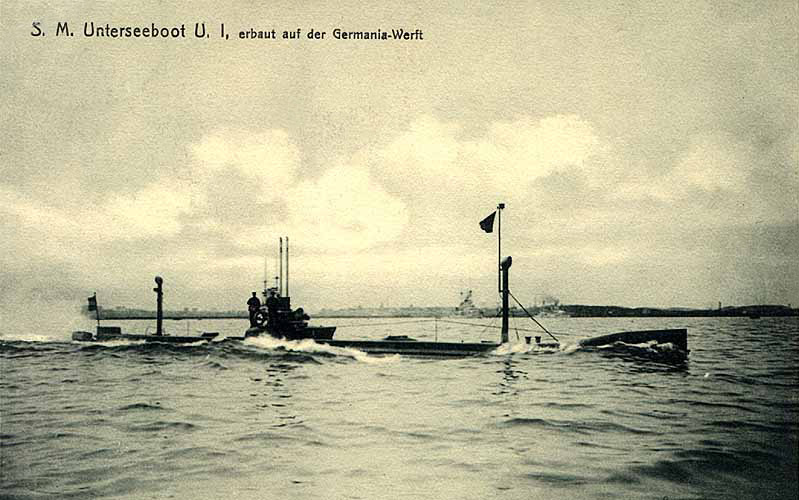
The first German submarine, the SM U-1. Her remains are on display at the Deutsches Museum in Munich.

In 1903, the Friedrich Krupp Germaniawerft dockyard in Kiel completed the first fully functional German-built submarine, Forelle, which Krupp sold to Russia during the Russo-Japanese War in April 1903. At this time, the German commander of the Navy Alfred von Tirpitz was building the High Seas Fleet with which he intended to challenge the supremacy of the UK Royal Navy. He focused on expensive battleships and there was no role for submarines in his fleet. Only when Krupp received an order for three Karp-class U-boats from Russia, did Tirpitz order one submarine. The SM U-1 was a completely redesigned Karp-class and when the Imperial German Navy commissioned it on 14 December 1906, it was the last major navy to adopt submarines. The U-1 had a double hull and a single 45 cm (18 in) torpedo tube. It used an electric motor powered by batteries for submerged propulsion and a Körting kerosene engine for charging the batteries and propulsion on the surface. The 50%-larger SM U-2 was commissioned in 1908, had four 45 cm torpedo tubes and a much larger battery capacity. But the boat was a failure due to problems with both the kerosene and electrical engines. The next two U-boats of the Type U 3-class, ordered on 13 August 1907, were more reliable. In March 1907, the Germaniawerft received an order from the Austro-Hungarian Navy for two 237 t (233 long tons) U-boats and in October Norway ordered a similar U-boat. These foreign U-boats were based on an improved U-1 design.

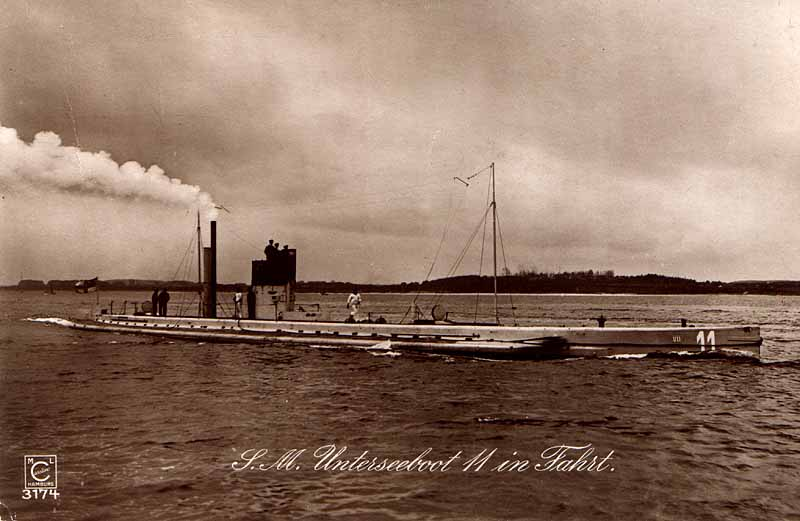
The German submarine U-11, showing the kerosene vapour trail.

Between 1908 and 1910, the German navy ordered fourteen 500 t (490-long-ton) boats with four 45 cm torpedo tubes and two reload torpedoes. These boats used a kerosene engine which was safer than gasoline and more powerful than steam, but the white exhaust of the kerosene betrayed the presence of the U-boats, robbing them of their primary asset, their stealth. Diesel engines did not have that disadvantage, but a powerful and reliable diesel engine was still under development. As some equipment could not be delivered within the specified weight limits, there was some variation in the total weight of each U-boat. Usually this was solved by reducing the number of battery cells, which affected underwater performance. The last two of these U-boats, the Type U 17, was designed to receive diesel engines but due to delays in developing a lightweight diesel engine, these U-boats were equipped with kerosene engines.

Between 1910 and 1912, twenty-three diesel U-boats were ordered when diesel engines finally became available: four 650 t (640-long-ton) Type U 19 U-boats on 20 November 1910 from KWD with MAN engines and four similar Type U 23 U-boats from Germaniawerft with Germaniawerft engines on 18 March 1911. These boats were larger to accommodate the diesel engines, and were equipped with 50 cm (20 in) torpedo tubes. On 12 February 1912 a further four similar Type U 27 were ordered from KWD, and although Germaniawerft experienced problems with its diesel engines, it received an order for eleven Type U 31 U-boats. Due to these problems, delivery of these U-boats was delayed up to eight months and ran into 1915. At the start of World War I in 1914, Germany had 48 submarines of 13 classes in service or under construction.

=== Pre–World War I classes ===
U-boats built by Germany for the German navy
| Type | Nbr built | In service | Displacement surface | Speed surface | Speed submerged | Engines surface | Engines submerged |
|---|---|---|---|---|---|---|---|
| U 1 | 1 | 1906 | 238 t (234 long tons) | 10.8 knots (20.0 km/h; 12.4 mph) | 8.9 knots (16.5 km/h; 10.2 mph) | 2 x 200 hp (150 kW) Korting | 2 x 200 hp (150 kW) |
| U 2 | 1 | 1908 | 341 t (336 long tons) | 13.2 knots (24.4 km/h; 15.2 mph) | 9.0 knots (16.7 km/h; 10.4 mph) | 2 x 300 hp (220 kW) Daimler | 2 x 315 hp (235 kW) |
| Type U 3 | 2 | 1909 | 421 t (414 long tons) | 11.8 knots (21.9 km/h; 13.6 mph) | 9.4 knots (17.4 km/h; 10.8 mph) | 2 x 300 hp (220 kW) Korting | 2 x 515 hp (384 kW) |
| Type U 5 | 4 | 1910-11 | 505 t (497 long tons) | 13.4 knots (24.8 km/h; 15.4 mph) | 10.2 knots (18.9 km/h; 11.7 mph) | 4 x 225 hp (168 kW) Korting | 2 x 520 hp (390 kW) |
| Type U 9 | 4 | 1910-11 | 493 t (485 long tons) | 14.2 knots (26.3 km/h; 16.3 mph) | 8.1 knots (15.0 km/h; 9.3 mph) | 2 x 225 hp (168 kW) Korting + 2 x 300 hp (220 kW) Korting | 2 x 580 hp (430 kW) |
| Type U 13 | 3 | 1912 | 516 t (508 long tons) | 14.8 knots (27.4 km/h; 17.0 mph) | 10.7 knots (19.8 km/h; 12.3 mph) | 2 x 250 hp (190 kW) Korting + 2 x 350 hp (260 kW) Korting | 2 x 600 hp (450 kW) |
| U 16 | 1 | 1911 | 489 t (481 long tons) | 15.6 knots (28.9 km/h; 18.0 mph) | 10.7 knots (19.8 km/h; 12.3 mph) | 2 x 242 hp (180 kW) Korting + 2 x 358 hp (267 kW) Korting | 2 x 600 hp (450 kW) |
| Type U 17 | 2 | 1912 | 564 t (555 long tons) | 14.9 knots (27.6 km/h; 17.1 mph) | 9.5 knots (17.6 km/h; 10.9 mph) | 4 x 350 hp (260 kW) Korting | 2 x 560 hp (420 kW) |
| Type U 19 | 4 | 1913 | 650 t (640 long tons) | 15.4 knots (28.5 km/h; 17.7 mph) | 9.5 knots (17.6 km/h; 10.9 mph) | 2 x 850 hp (630 kW) MAN | 2 x 600 hp (450 kW) |
| Type U 23 | 4 | 1913-14 | 669 t (658 long tons) | 16.7 knots (30.9 km/h; 19.2 mph) | 10.3 knots (19.1 km/h; 11.9 mph) | 2 x 900 hp (670 kW) GW | 2 x 600 hp (450 kW) |
| Type U 27 | 4 | 1914 | 675 t (664 long tons) | 16.7 knots (30.9 km/h; 19.2 mph) | 9.8 knots (18.1 km/h; 11.3 mph) | 2 x 1,000 hp (750 kW) MAN | 2 x 600 hp (450 kW) |
| Type U 31 | 11 | 1914-15 | 685 t (674 long tons) | 16.7 knots (30.9 km/h; 19.2 mph) | 9.8 knots (18.1 km/h; 11.3 mph) | 2 x 925 hp (690 kW) GW | 2 x 600 hp (450 kW) |
| Type U 43 | 8 | 1915-16 | 725 t (714 long tons) | 15.2 knots (28.2 km/h; 17.5 mph) | 9.7 knots (18.0 km/h; 11.2 mph) | 2 x 1,000 hp (750 kW) MAN | 2 x 600 hp (450 kW) |

U-boats built by Germany for foreign navies
| Type | Nbr built | In service | Displacement surface | Speed surface | Speed submerged | Bow tubes | Stern Tubes | Deck gun |
|---|---|---|---|---|---|---|---|---|
| Forelle | 1 | 1904 | 16 t (16 long tons) | 5.5 knots (10.2 km/h; 6.3 mph) | 5.5 knots (10.2 km/h; 6.3 mph) | 2 x 45 cm | -- | -- |
| Karp-class | 3 | 1907 | 210 t (210 long tons) | 10 knots (19 km/h; 12 mph) | 8.5 knots (15.7 km/h; 9.8 mph) | 1 x 45 cm | -- | -- |
| U-3-class | 2 | 1909 | 421 t (414 long tons) | 12 knots (22 km/h; 14 mph) | 8.5 knots (15.7 km/h; 9.8 mph) | 2 x 45 cm | -- | -- |
| Kobben | 1 | 1910-11 | 505 t (497 long tons) | 11.9 knots (22.0 km/h; 13.7 mph) | 8.9 knots (16.5 km/h; 10.2 mph) | 2 x 45 cm | 1 x 45 cm | -- |
| Atropo | 1 | 1912 | 231 t (227 long tons) | 14.7 knots (27.2 km/h; 16.9 mph) | 8 knots (15 km/h; 9.2 mph) | 2 x 45 cm | -- | -- |

== World War I (1914–1918) ==
=== Operations ===
During 1914, the U-boats operated against the British fleet: on 5 September 1914, the light cruiser HMS Pathfinder was sunk by SM U-21, the first ship to be sunk by a submarine using a self-propelled torpedo. On 22 September, U-9 sank the armoured cruisers HMS Aboukir, HMS Cressy, and HMS Hogue. As a result, the British Grand Fleet had to withdraw to safer waters in Northern Ireland. Against merchant ships, U-boats observed the "prize rules" which meant they had to stop and inspect the ship, and take the crew off the ship before they could sink it. On 20 October 1914, SM U-17 sank the first merchant ship, SS Glitra, off Norway. Only ten merchants were sunk in that way before policy was changed on 18 February 1915.

German U-boat losses by cause
| Surface warships | 55 |
| Mines | 48 |
| Submarines | 18 |
| Q-ships | 11 |
| Merchant ships | 7 |
| Aircraft | 1 |
| Accidents | 19 |
| Unknown | 19 |
| Total | 178 |

On the continent German hopes for a quick victory were dashed and a stalemate had settled on the front. The Germans hoped to break the deadlock by starting an unrestricted submarine campaign against shipping in the waters around the British Isles. This was also cited as a retaliation for British minefields and shipping blockades. Under the instructions given to U-boat captains, they could sink merchant ships, even neutral ones, without warning. Only 29 U-boats were available for the campaign, and not more than seven were active around the British Isles at any time. The U-boats failed to enforce a blockade but the sinking of three liners including the RMS Lusitania, (Note: On 7 May 1915 SM U-20 sank RMS Lusitania; on 19 August SM U-24 sank SS Arabic; and on 9 September SM U-20 sank RMS Hesperian.) with loss of American lives, outraged the US so that the Kaiser had to stop the campaign on 19 September 1915. After the stop of the campaign, most of the U-boats were sent to the Mediterranean.

At the beginning of 1916, 54 U-boats were available, and the Kaiser allowed again operations around the British Isles, but with strict rules: no attacks on liners, and outside the war zone around the British Isles attacks were only allowed on armed merchant ships. But on 24 March, after 25 Americans were killed in the torpedoing of the ferry SS Sussex the US threatened to sever diplomatic ties, which persuaded the Germans to fully reapply prize rules.

In September 1916, 120 U-boats were in service, and again some were sent to the Mediterranean. Whilst around British Isles prize rules were observed, in the Mediterranean a new unrestricted campaign was started. The renewed German campaign was effective, sinking 1,400,000 GRT of shipping between October 1916 and January 1917. Despite this, the deadlock situation on the continent frontlines demanded even greater results, and on 1 February 1917, Germany restarted the unrestricted submarine campaign around British Isles. Germany took the gamble that the U-boat campaign would force the UK out of the war before the US could effectively enter. On 3 February, the US severed diplomatic relations with Germany, and on 6 April, the US declared war on Germany. Unrestricted submarine warfare in 1917 was very successful, sinking more than 500,000 GRT a month. With the introduction of convoys in August 1917, shipping losses declined to 300,000 GRT a month on average, which was not sufficient to force the UK out of the war. With deteriorating conditions on the continent, all U-boats were recalled on 31 October 1918. Under the terms of armistice of 11 November 1918, U-boats were to immediately surrender. All U-boats were either scrapped or given to Allied navies.

Of the 373 German U-boats that had been built, 179 were operational or nearly operational at the end of the war. 178 were lost by enemy action. 512 officers and 4894 enlisted men were killed. Of the surviving German submarines, 14 U-boats were scuttled and 122 surrendered. They sank 10 pre-dreadnought battleships, 18 cruisers, and several smaller naval vessels. They further destroyed 5,708 merchant and fishing vessels for a total of 11,108,865 GRT and the loss of about 15,000 sailors. The Pour le Mérite, the highest decoration for gallantry for officers, was awarded to 29 U-boat commanders. The three most successful U-boat commanders were Lothar von Arnauld de la Perière (195 ships with 453,869 GRT), followed by Walter Forstmann (149 ships with 391,607 GRT), and Max Valentiner (144 ships with 299,482 GRT).

=== World War I Classes ===
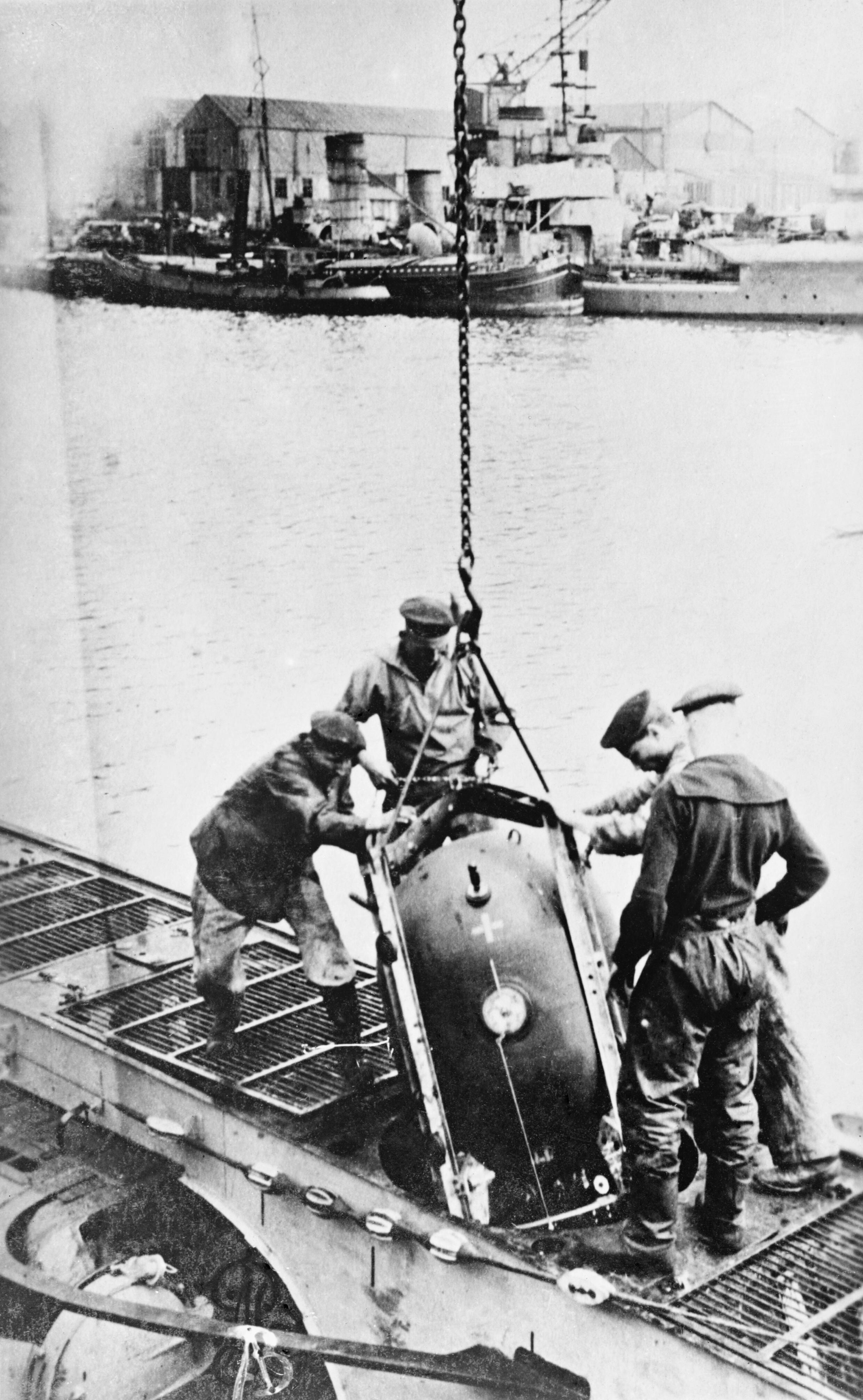
Sea mines are loaded in a UC coastal submarine in the harbour of Zeebrugge

When the German Army captured three ports on the Belgian coast in the opening stages of the war, the German navy ordered coastal submarines to be operated from these ports against the English coast. As the war was then expected to end in a matter of months, only very small 130 t (130 long tons) U-boats could be designed with an expected building time of four months. On 15 October 1914 fifteen Type UB I U-boats were ordered, and based on that design, on 23 November a further fifteen Type UC I coastal minelaying U-boats were ordered. Given the weakness of the Austro-Hungarian Navy and the need to help their Turkish Allies, the German Navy sent some of these U-boats to the Dardanelles and Black Sea.

In the spring of 1915 it became clear that the war would continue well into 1916 and more coastal U-boats were ordered. The Type UB I and UC I had fulfilled the expectations but were underpowered. Thirty U-boats of the succeeding Type UB II were ordered, which were with around 270 t (270 long tons) double in size. As with the cessation of unrestricted U-boat warfare in September 1915, mine warfare became more prominent, a record number of 64 Type UC II minelaying U-boats were ordered, which allowed for the first time for the mass-production of a U-boat. The Type UC II proved to be an ideal combination of mine and torpedo armament: on the same patrol it could lay minefields and attack shipping on the way to its target.

On the resumption of the U-boat campaign in 1916, it was realized that not enough large U-boats could be built in time, and as a compromise it was decided to build an enlargened coastal U-boat capable of patrolling in the Western Approaches. The hull of the Type UC II was taken as a basis, the forward mineshaft room was replaced with a torpedo room, more powerful diesel engines provided better surface speed and larger fuel tanks extended the range. On 2 May 1916 the first twenty-four Type UB III were ordered and as the war prolonged, more than 200 were ordered but only 96 were commissioned before the armistice.

| standard U-boat types | Type U 51, Type U 57, Type U 63, Type U 66, Type U 81, Type U 87, Type U 93 |
| U-cruisers and merchant U-boat types | Type U 139, Type U 142, Type U 151, Type UD 1 |
| UB coastal U-boat types | Type UB I, Type UB II, Type UB III, Type UF, Type UG |
| UC coastal minelaying U-boat types | Type UC I, Type UC II, Type UC III |
| UE ocean minelaying U-boat types | Type UE I, Type UE II |

== Interwar years (1919–1939) ==
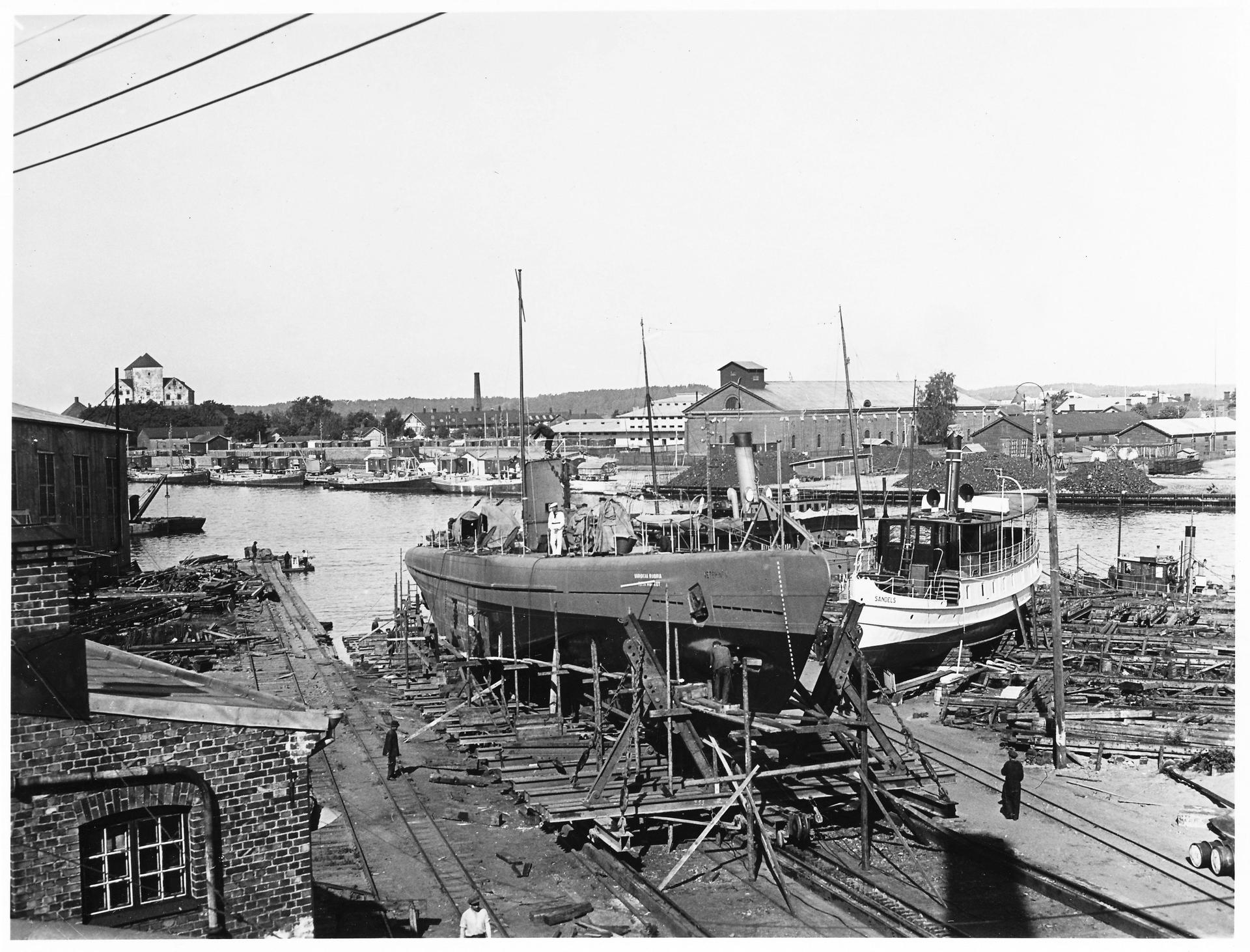
The Finnish submarine Vetehinen in 1930 on the slipways at the Crichton-Vulcan shipyard in Turku, Finland

=== Construction ===
The Treaty of Versailles ending World War I signed at the Paris Peace Conference in 1919 limited the surface navy of Germany's new Weimar Republic to only six battleships, six cruisers, twelve destroyers and twelve torpedo boats. The treaty also restricted the independent tonnage of ships and forbade the construction of submarines. In order to circumvent the restrictions of the treaty, a submarine design office called Ingenieurskantoor voor Scheepsbouw (IVS) was set up in the Netherlands The IVS was run by Krupp and made it possible to maintain a lead in submarine technology by designing and constructing submarines in Holland for other nations. The IVS made designs for small 250-ton U-boats, medium 500-ton U-boats and large 750-ton U-boats.

The IVS constructed three 500-ton medium submarines in Finland between 1927 and 1931, known as the Vetehinen-class. These ships were the prototypes for the subsequent German Type VII U-boat. In 1933 a small 250-ton submarine, the Vesikko was built. This submarine was nearly identical to the subsequent German Type II U-boat. A fifth very small 100-ton submarine, the Saukko was built in 1933 as well. In Spain a large 750-ton boat was built between 1929 and 1930. After the Spanish lost interest in the U-boat, they sold it to Turkey where it entered service as Gür. German sailors assisted in the trials for these submarines. These secret programs were exposed in the Lohmann Affair and as a result the Head of the Reichsmarine, Hans Zenker, had to resign. His successor Erich Raeder continued the policy of secretly breaching the Versailles treaty. On 15 November 1932, a plan was approved for an expansion of the German navy which included U-boats.

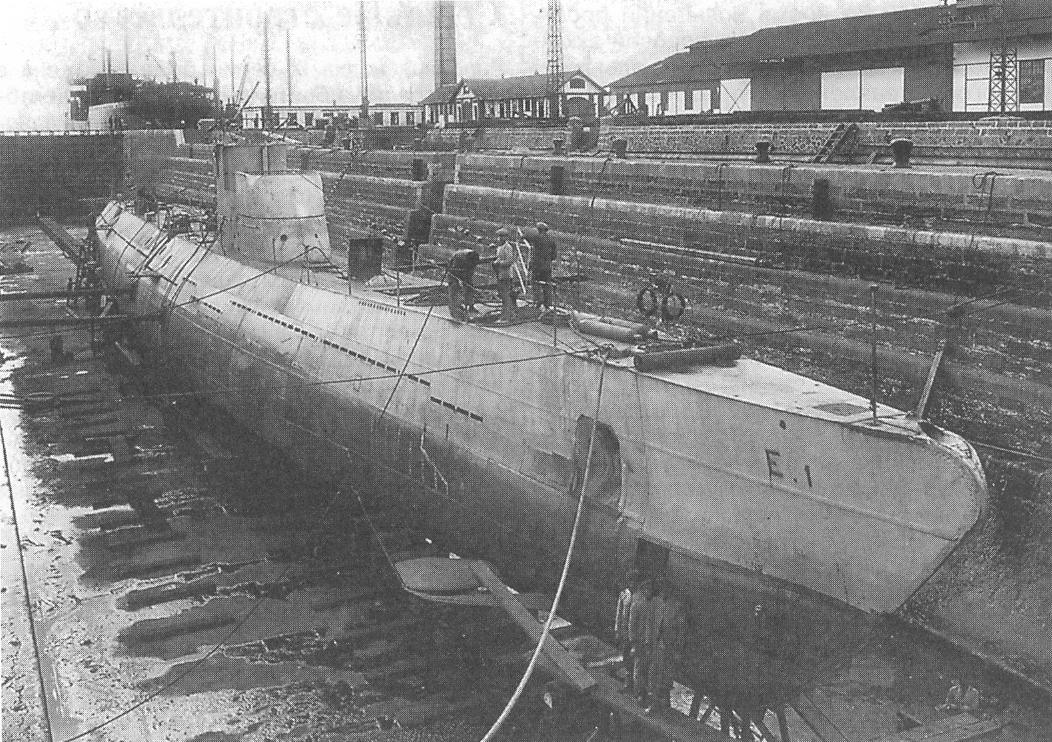
The Spanish submarine E-1 in Cadiz

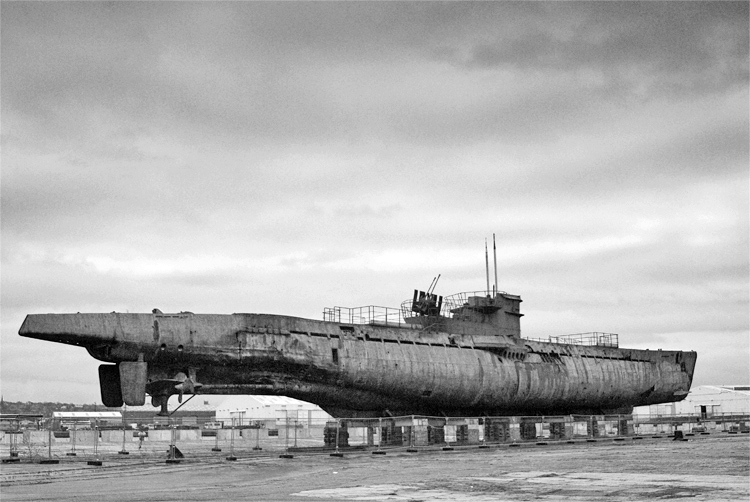
U-534, a type IX U-boat at Birkenhead Docks, Merseyside, England

In 1935, Britain sought to limit Germany's increasingly apparent breaches of the Versailles treaty, negotiating the Anglo-German Naval Agreement. Under the agreement, Germany was relieved of some Treaty of Versailles restrictions and permitted to build ships in a 100:35 tonnage ratio to the British fleet. For submarines the Germans obtained parity in tonnage, but promised a 45 percent limit unless special circumstances arose. This allowed 24,000 tons for U-boat building. Only one week after the agreement was signed, the first of six Type II U-boats, U-1 was commissioned in the German Navy, which changed name from Reichsmarine (Imperial Navy) to Kriegsmarine (War Navy). Within the year, the Germans commissioned a total of 36 U-boats for a total of 12,500 tons:

- Twenty-four small 250-ton Type II U-boats
- Ten medium 500-ton Type VII U-boats
- Two large 750-ton Type I U-boats, based on the design of the Spanish submarine

Karl Dönitz was appointed as head of the submarine section of the Kriegsmarine. He believed firmly that in spite of the Anglo-German Naval agreement and Hitler's policy of avoiding conflict with Britain, the next war would be with Britain. He requested the remaining 11,500 tons be used to build twenty-three medium submarines, which he considered ideal for a commerce war against British convoys. Raeder disagreed, and opted for a more balanced expansion of the submarine fleet:

- Eight small 250-ton improved type II U-boats
- Seven medium 500-ton U-boats. The type VII was designed with a single rudder and this had two drawbacks: as the rudder was not in the wash of the two propellers, the rudder response was not good. The stern torpedo tube had also to be mounted externally as the rudder obstructed the exit of an internal tube. As a consequence, this tube could not be reloaded. Hence the type VII was upgraded to type VIIB with dual rudders to improve maneuverability and to fit an internal stern tube with a reload.
- Eight large 750-ton U-boats. The Type I was found to be unsatisfactory, suffering the same single rudder maneuverability problems of the Type VII and a very poor diving time. The gravity center of the U-boat was too forward, so when surfaced the Type I had its propellers exposed when pitching. Whilst submerged, it suffered problems with depth keeping and stability caused by the wobbling of air bubbles in the fuel tanks. Hence a new Type IX design for a large U-boat was made.

Twenty-one of these twenty-three U-boats were commissioned before World War II. In 1937, Britain announced it would expand its submarine fleet from 52,700 to 70,000 tons. Again, Raeder decided that the extra 7,785 tons would be divided between medium and large U-boats:

- Seven medium 500-ton Type VIIB U-boats
- Five large 750-ton of the improved Type IXB U-boats

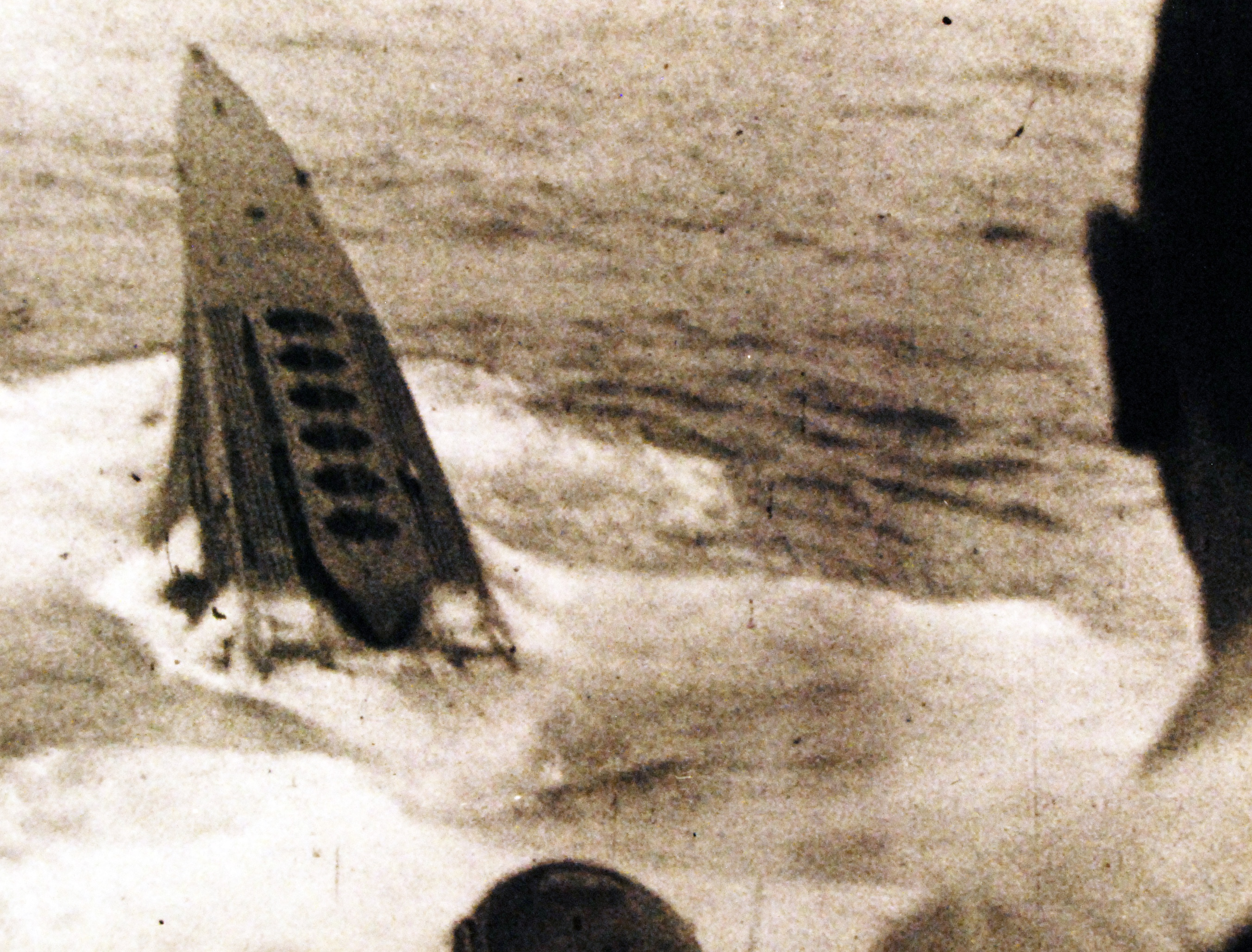
A Type XB submarine sinking in the Atlantic. On the foredeck the vertical mineshafts are visible.

During 1938, Hitler changed his attitude towards Britain. Whilst he still hoped that Britain would not interfere in his foreign policy, he needed a navy that could act as a deterrent. Hitler wanted to invoke the escape clause of the naval agreement and to have 70,000 tons of submarines. Between May 1938 and January 1939, Raeder ordered 52 more U-boats to be completed by 1942:

- Twenty-one medium 500-ton Type VIIB U-boats
- Eleven large 750-ton Type IXB U-boats
- Three very large Type XB minelaying U-boats
- Four huge Type XI U-cruisers

In 1939, the ambitious Plan Z was launched. It called for the construction of a German navy capable of challenging the Royal Navy. The plan included 249 U-boats for a total of 200,000 tons. But when World War II broke out only months after the plan was announced, only a handful of the planned U-boats were under construction. When World War II started, Germany had 56 U-boats commissioned, of which 46 were operational and 22 having sufficient range for Atlantic operations; the other 24 were limited to North Sea operations.

=== Developments ===
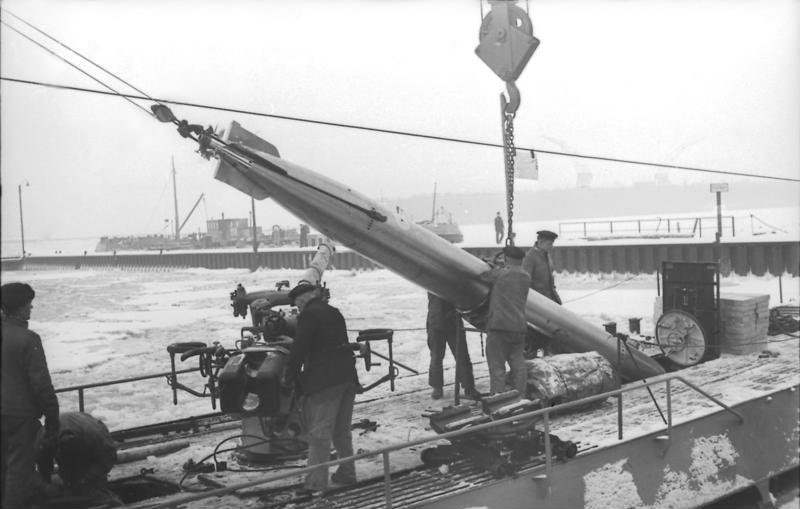
A torpedo is loaded into a U-Boat through a torpedo hatch.

German U-boat designs of World War II were significant improvements over their World War I equivalents. By using new steel alloy and welding instead of riveting, they had stronger hulls and could dive deeper. The diving time was improved to thirty seconds for a medium U-boat. The power of diesel engines rose, allowing higher speeds while surfaced. Range was increased by installing saddle tanks, which were on open to the sea on the bottom in order to balance pressure, with the diesel fuel floating freely atop the seawater. A technique was developed for economical cruising where only one of the two diesel engines would be run and would drive the two propeller shafts through a coupling with the two electro engines.

Another vast improvement was the introduction of new torpedo types for the U-boats: the classic G7a torpedo propelled by compressed air had a much larger warhead than its WWI equivalent, but more important was the introduction of the electric G7e torpedo. Though slow with range limitations, it left no telltale bubble wake, making it ideal for daylight attacks. During WWI, the Germans had briefly experimented with magnetic pistols and these were further developed now as the standard pistol for torpedoes. The classic contact pistol required a torpedo to detonate against the ship's hull, whilst a magnetic torpedo could detonate below a ship, resulting in a much more damaging explosion. Thus, it was hoped that one torpedo would suffice to break the back of a ship, and a U-boat could sink many more ships with its supply of torpedoes. All U-boats were now also equipped with long- and short-wave transmitters, enabling communications with bases ashore and with other U-boats. This allowed for better operational information and guidance.

=== U-Boat design and layout ===
Cross-section of a Type VII U-boat

From bow to stern, A typical U-boat design comprised these sections:

- Bow torpedo room. The torpedo tubes were loaded but torpedoes needed maintenance so there was space to unload the tubes. Below the floor plates four spare torpedoes were stored. Two more spares were stored above the floorplates where they occupied much of the available space. The crew responsible for the torpedo maintenance and launching had their sleeping bunks in this compartment, along with the lowest ratings on board. As long as the two spare torpedoes above the floorplates were not launched, living conditions were very cramped here. Once launched, space for extra bunks became available but, anyway, there were not enough sleeping bunks for all the crew, and these were 'hot bunks' which switched occupants as they went on or off duty.
- Crew quarters for officers and chief petty officers, with a battery compartment below decks. The captain had a curtained bunk which faced two small rooms: the radio room and the hydrophone room.
- Control room. The main large periscope, for general use, was located here. The rudder, diving planes, ballast and trim tanks were operated here with valves and buttons. Below decks, there was space to retract the periscope and to store ammunition for the deck gun. A cylindrical tube with a ladder led to the conning tower.
- Conning tower. This space protruded from the cylindrical hull but was still within the pressure hull. Here, the angle and depth settings for the torpedoes were calculated with an analogue data solver. During submerged attacks the captain was on station here, operating the second, smaller attack periscope, which generated less wake at the surface. Above the conning tower was the bridge.
- Aft crew quarters for petty officers, with another battery compartment below decks. The galley and toilet were also located here.
- Engine (diesel) room. The diesel engines needed air, which was supplied through a pipe outside the pressure hull from the bridge, as high as possible from sea level. There was no exhaust pipe; in order to reduce smoke the exhaust was mixed with sea water. The diesel engine could drive an air compressor in order to feed air tanks needed for venting the ballast tanks.
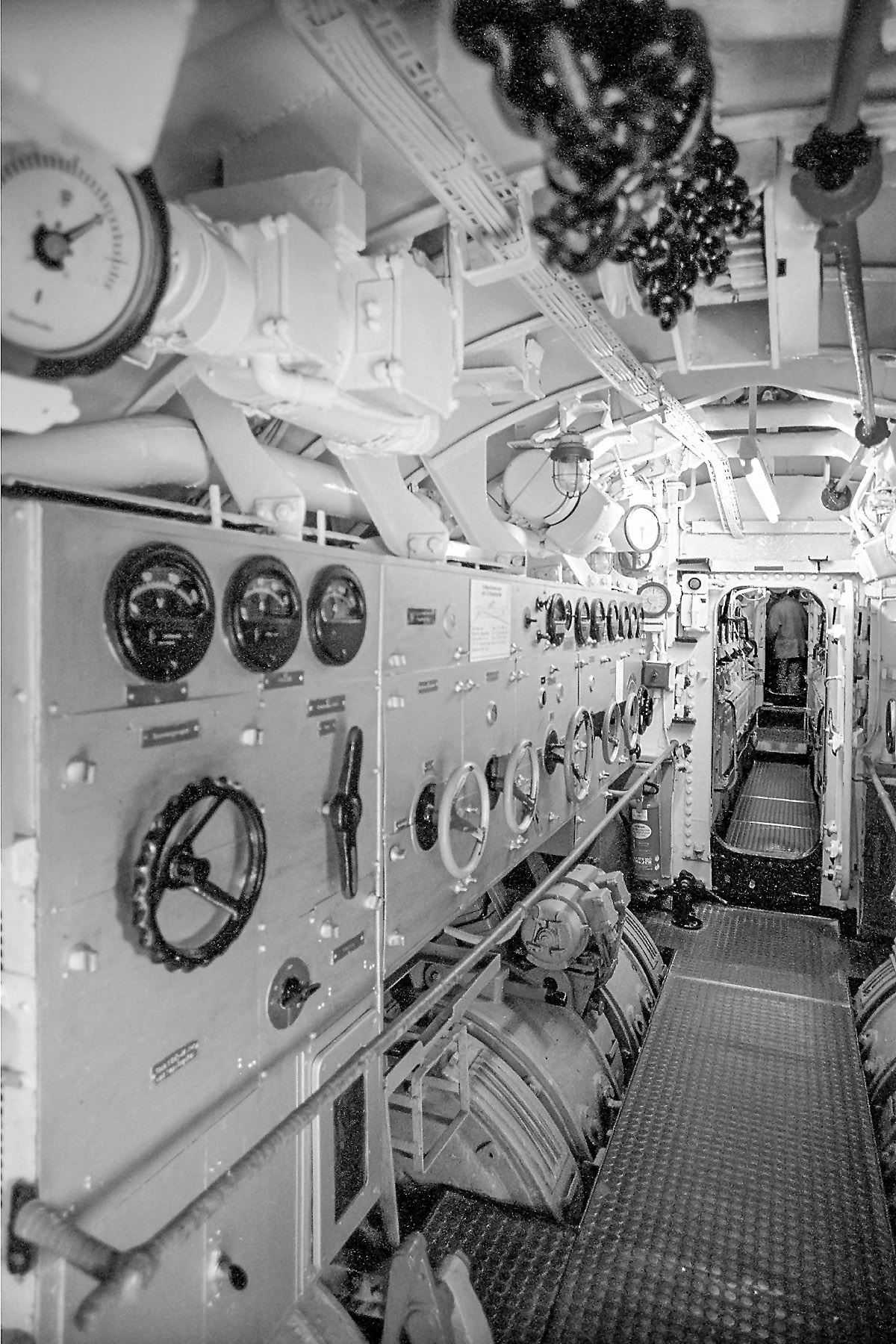
  The electrical room
- Electrical or motor room. The electric motors were driven by the batteries. Alternatively, when driven by the diesel engines, the motors acted as generators for recharging the batteries.
- Aft torpedo room. Only bigger type IX U-boats had such a compartment. Smaller U-boats did not have aft torpedo tubes at all, or had a single torpedo tube installed in the motor room, with a spare torpedo stored below decks between the engines.

== World War II (1939–1945) ==
=== Operations ===
During World War II, U-boat warfare was the major component of the Battle of the Atlantic, which began in 1939 and ended with Germany's surrender in 1945. British prime minister Winston Churchill later wrote "The only thing that really frightened me during the war was the U-boat peril."

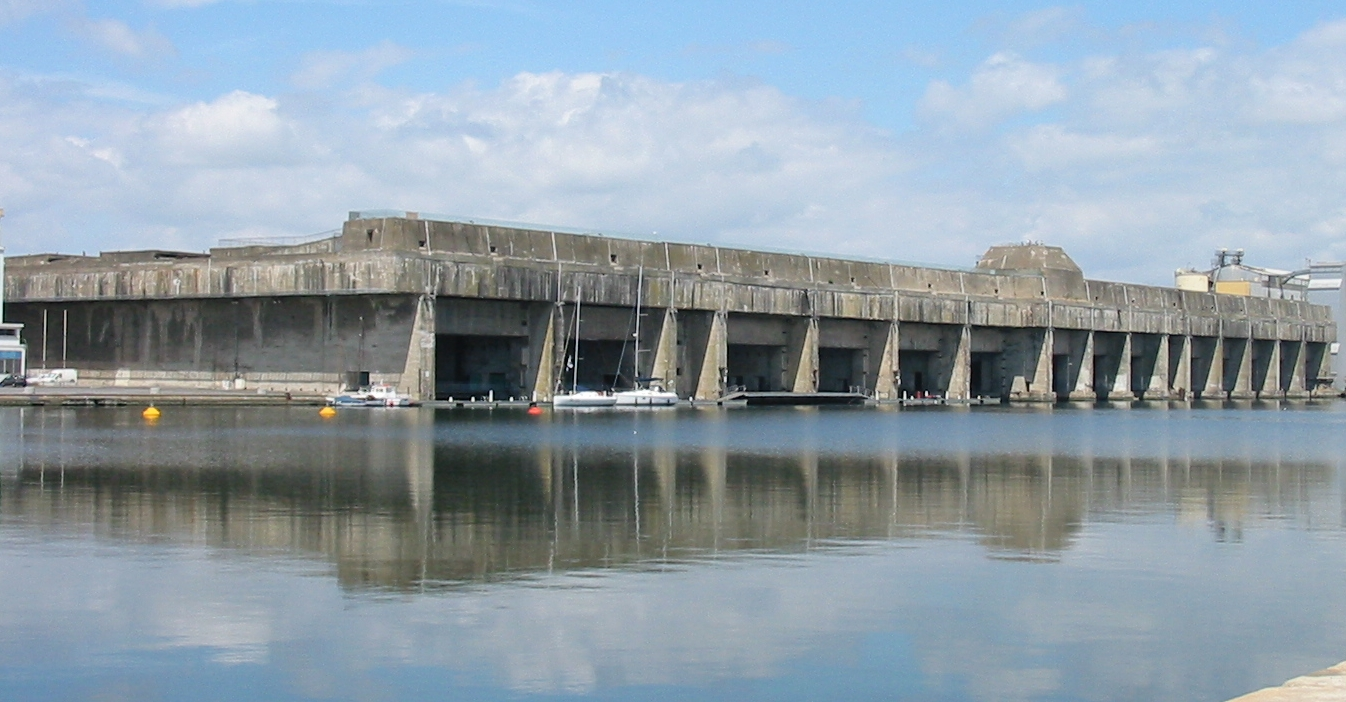
U-boat pens in Saint-Nazaire, France

As convoying had been key in the defeat of German submarines during World War I, the British began organizing convoys at once in September 1939. The most common U-boat attack against convoys during the early years of the war was conducted on the surface and at night. During 1939 the Germans made a few attempts to attack convoys with their new 'wolfpack' tactic, but these were not successful. The invasion of Norway in April 1940 temporarily halted all U-boat operations against merchant shipping. During the invasion many technical problems with the German torpedoes were exposed and only in August 1940 could the campaign against convoys be revived. There were now fewer U-boats operational than at the beginning of the war, but thanks to the new bases in France and Norway U-boats could reach their operation grounds far more easily. During the following months the U-boats put their 'wolfpack' tactic against convoy in practice with spectacular results. This period, before the Allied forces developed truly effective antisubmarine warfare tactics, was referred to by German submariners as the happy time (die glückliche Zeit).

In the beginning of 1941, British countermeasures began to take effect: in March 1941, the three leading U-boat aces were sunk during convoy battles. In May 1941, the British were able to break into German secret naval Enigma communications and could henceforth reroute convoys around U-boat concentrations. When American warships started to escort Atlantic convoys, the U-boats were restricted in their operations as Hitler wanted to avoid conflict with the US. The campaign against merchant shipping received further impediments when Hitler interfered on two occasions: first he insisted that a small force of U-boats be kept on station in the Arctic as a precaution against a possible Allied invasion in Norway, and next, he ordered a substantial force of U-boats to operate in the Mediterranean in order to support the Italians and Rommel's Afrika Korps.

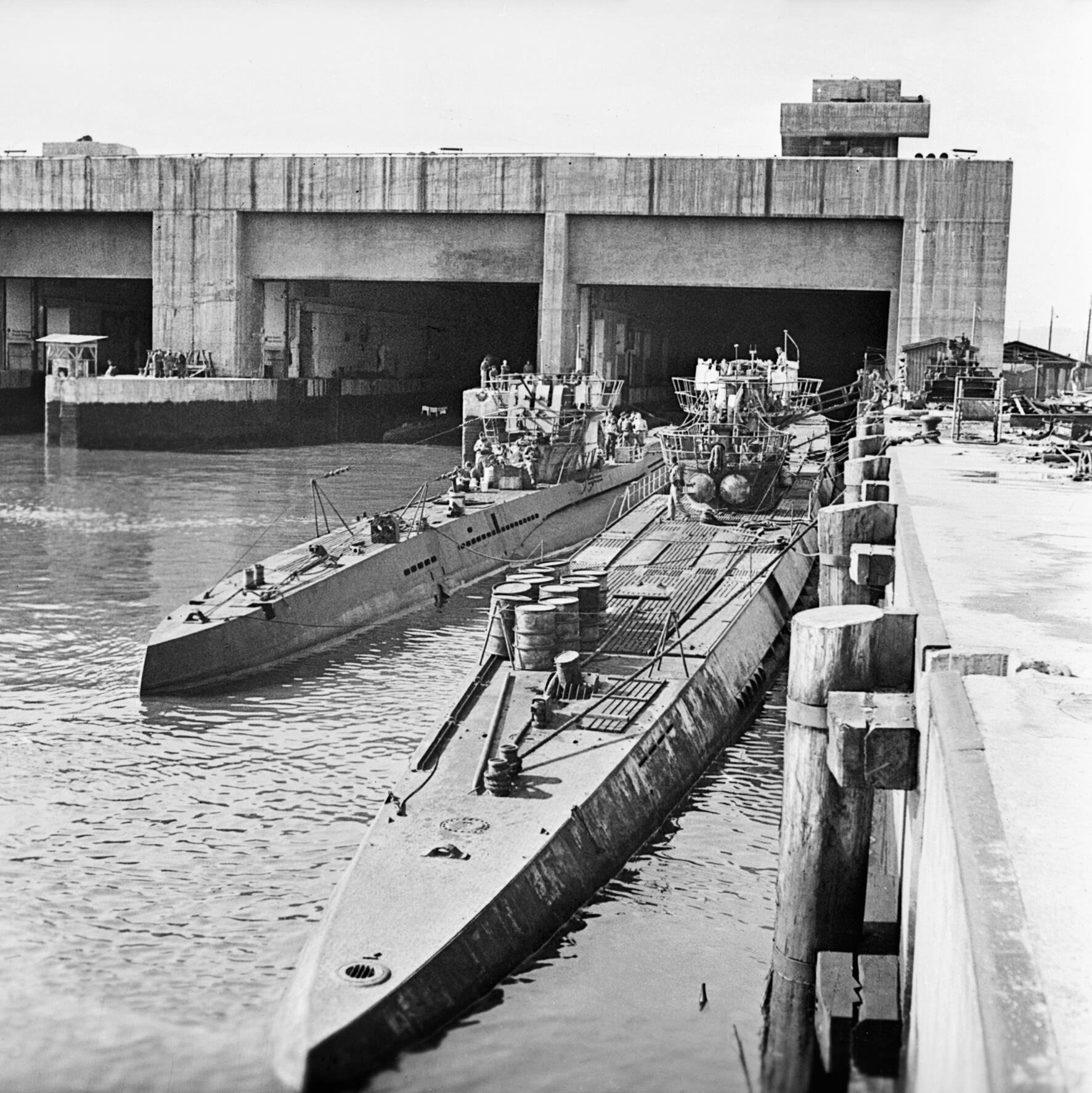
Captured Type VII and Type IX U-boats outside their pen in Trondheim, Norway, 19 May 1945

When the US entered the war, the focus of U-boat operations shifted to the Atlantic coast of the United States and Canada, where no convoys were organized and anti-submarine measures were inadequate. There followed a Second Happy Time when U-boats could extend their successful operation to the Gulf of Mexico and the Caribbean Sea. By mid-1942 an adequate defense was organized in these regions; U-boats returned to their original and crucial hunting grounds on the North Atlantic convoy lanes. The renewed offensive against convoys reached its climax in March 1943, when two-thirds of all ships sunk had been sailing in convoys. The Allies put effective countermeasures into effect, and only two months later on 24 May, Dönitz had to stop the campaign due to heavy losses.

By the end of the war, U-boats had sunk 2,600 merchant ships (out of a total of 2,825 sunk by Axis submarines) and 175 warships. In total, 1181 U-boats entered service before the German surrender, of which 863 executed war patrols, and 785 were lost. 222 U-boats were scuttled by their crews and 174 surrendered to Allied forces. 121 U-boats were scuttled in 1945–46 during Operation Deadlight.

=== U-boat developments ===
==== Schnorkel ====
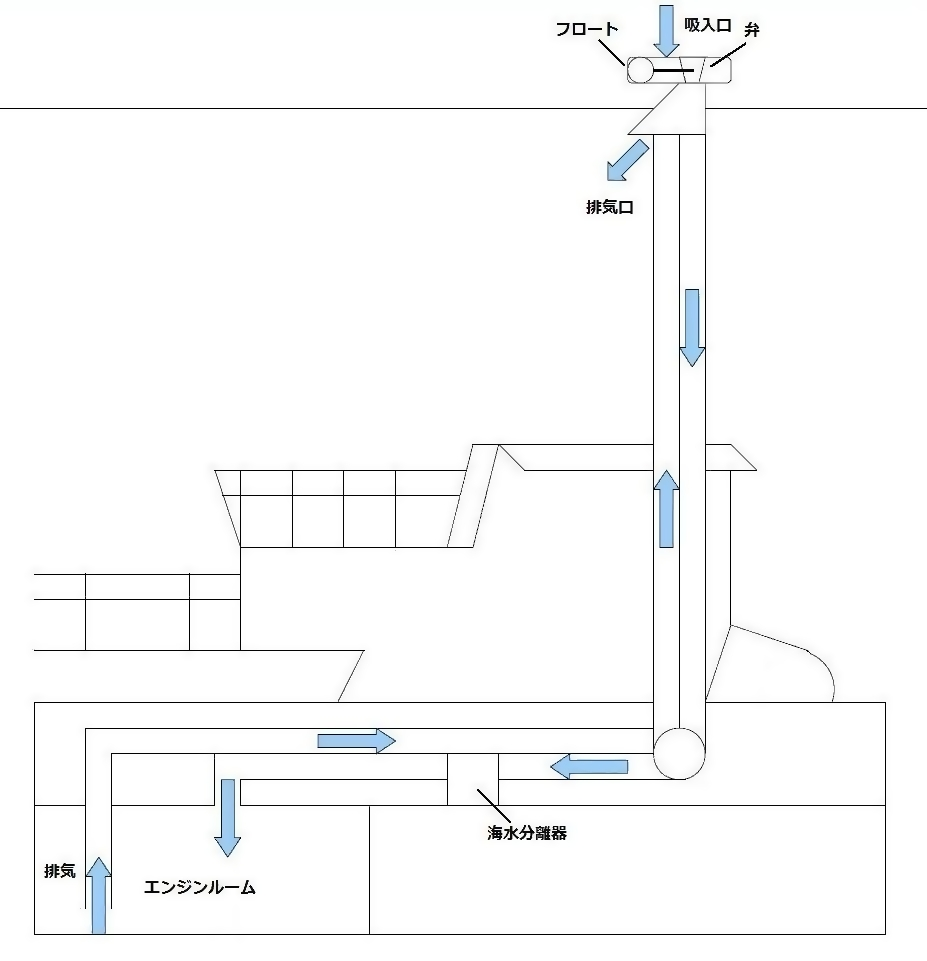
The Schnorkel mast and air flows

After the German invasion of the Netherlands in 1940, the Germans captured some Dutch submarines equipped with a Schnorchel (snorkel) but saw no need for them until 1943. The Schnorchel was a retractable pipe that supplied air to the diesel engines while submerged at periscope depth, allowing the boats to cruise submerged on diesel engines and recharge their batteries. It was far from a perfect solution: problems occurred with the device's valve sticking shut or closing as it dunked in rough weather; since the system used the entire pressure hull as a buffer, the diesels would instantaneously suck huge volumes of air from the boat's compartments, often causing painful ear injuries. Speed was limited to 8 knots (15 km/h), lest the device snap from stress. Whilst running submerged with the Schnorchel, the Gruppenhorchgerät was rendered useless by diesel engine noise. The Schnorchel nonetheless allowed old Type VII and IX U-boats to operate in waters that were previously denied to them.

==== Walter turbine ====
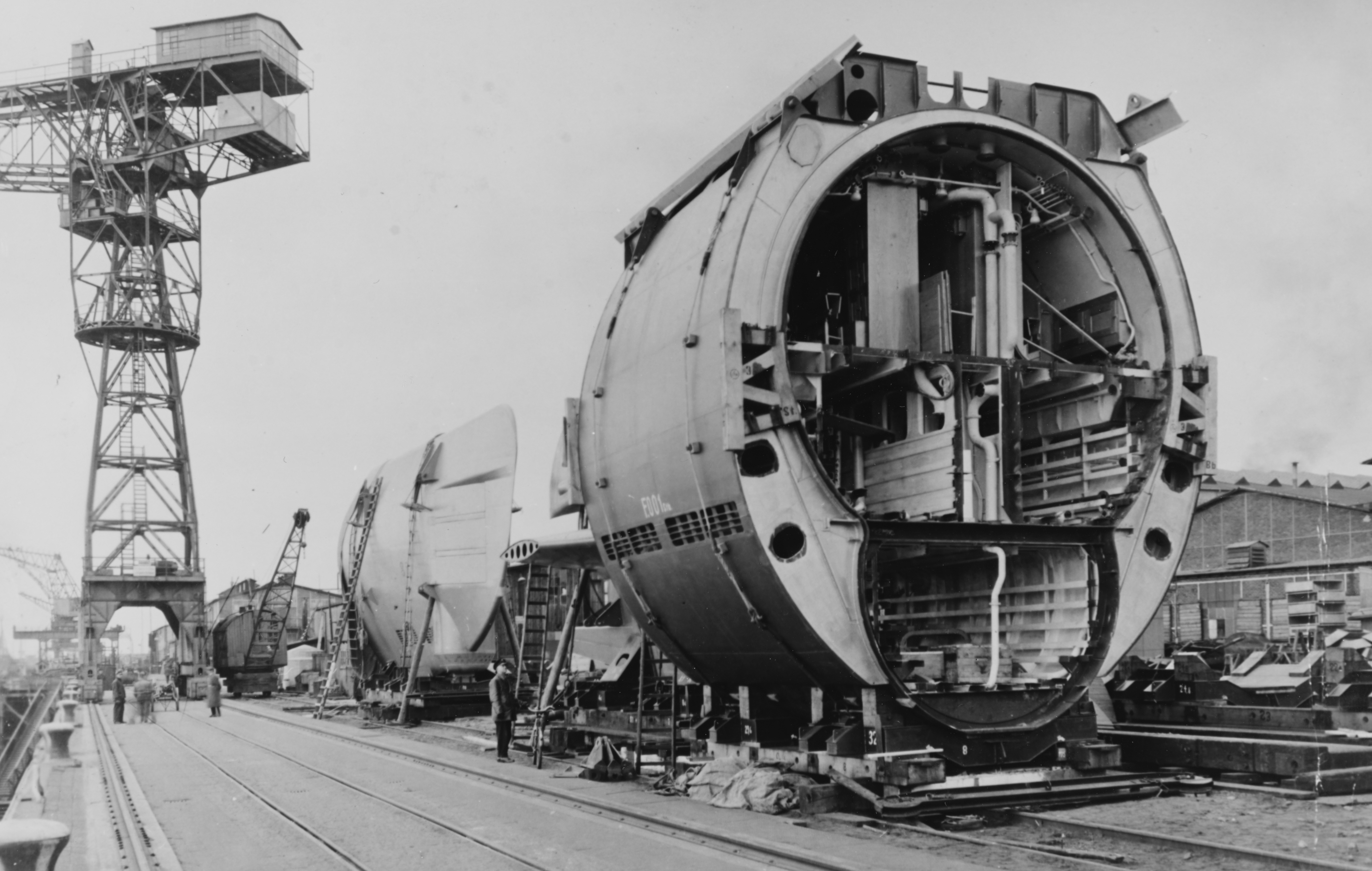
A prefabricated segment of a Type XXI U-boat. The cross-section shows clearly the '8'-shaped hull, where the lower part was used to store large batteries hence the name of 'ElektroBoot'

A World War II-era submarine relied on diesel engines for surface cruising, and on battery-powered electric engines for underwater travel. Submerged speed and range were limited by the battery capacity. For example, the standard ocean-going U-boat Type VII had a surface range of 8,700 nmi (16,100 km; 10,000 mi) at cruising speed of 10 kn (19 km/h; 12 mph), but only a submerged range of 90 nmi (170 km; 100 mi) at a cruising speed of 4 kn (7.4 km/h; 4.6 mph). A top speed of 8 kn (15 km/h; 9.2 mph) could only be maintained for one hour. Because of these limitations, a submarine was in fact rather a surface vessel with the capability to dive for tactical reasons. Once a submarine was detected and submerged, its chances to execute a successful attack were quite low. In 1933 Hellmuth Walter, a German engineer working at Germaniawerft sought to overcome these limitations, and started to experiment with hydrogen peroxide powered engines for high-speed underwater propulsion. In the autumn of 1940 his experimental submarine V-80 achieved an underwater speed of 28.1 knots (52.0 km/h; 32.3 mph) with an air-independent propulsion system consisting of a hydrogen peroxide powered steam turbine.

Four more experimental Type XVIIA U-boats with Walter turbines were built and tested but the design proved to be difficult to implement in a big frontline U-boat: there were many teething problems with the Walter turbine but there was also the problem that unlike a classic U-boat that could recharge its batteries with the diesel engines, once a Walter U-boat had consumed its hydrogen peroxide propellant it could not submerge anymore. The Germans did not possess the resources and plants to produce sufficient hydrogen peroxide to operate a fleet of Walter submarines. Despite these limitations, 24 frontline coastal Type XVIIB submarines and two ocean-going Type XVIII were ordered, but only three Type XVIIB were built and none were operational before the end of the war.

==== Elektroboot ====
Once it became clear these Walter U-boats would not be operational in time, German engineers took up the idea of using the large turbine room and hydrogen peroxide tanks of these Type XVII and Type XVIII U-boats to install larger electric engines and extra battery cells, which would vastly increase underwater speed and range. Based on the design of Type XVIII, the ocean-going Type XXI "Elektroboot" was rushed into production in 1943, and a coastal Type XXIII "Elektroboot" was based on the Type XVIIB. Hundreds of Type XXI were ordered, the Elektroboote were mass-produced, with prefabricated segments constructed at different sites and then assembled at the bigger shipyards. But due to problems with the new mass-building process, design shortcomings, shortages in skilled labour and strategic bombing only 118 Type XXI were commissioned before the end of the war, and of these, many had technical issues that required much aftercare so that in the end only one started a war patrol.

=== Classes ===
- Type I: first design for a large 750-ton U-boat. Only 2 built as the design was not very successful.
- Type II: small coastal submarines used mainly for training purposes. The latest subtype IID had saddle tanks which gave it a range to operate in the Atlantic, which it did until 1941
- Type VII: the "workhorse" of the U-boats with 709 completed in World War II
- Type IX: these long-range U-boats operated as far as the Indian Ocean with the Japanese (Monsun Gruppe), and the South Atlantic
- Type X: long-range minelayers but mainly used to resupply other U-boats
- Type XIV: lightly armed with no torpedo tubes and light AA, used to resupply other U-boats; nicknamed the Milchkuh ("Milk Cow")
- Type XVII: small experimental coastal submarines powered by experimental hydrogen peroxide propulsion systems, not put into service
- Type XXI: known as the Elektroboot. The design was taken into mass production, but only two set out for a war patrol before the end of the war
- Type XXIII: smaller version of the XXI used for coastal operations. operated on a small scale during 1945
- Midget submarines, including Biber, Hai, Molch, and Seehund
- Uncompleted U-boat projects

== Post–World War II and Cold War (after 1945) ==
Type XXIII U-Boat Hecht in 1957.

=== Type 201, 202 and 205 ===
The London and Paris Conferences in 1954 paved the way for West Germany to join NATO, and from 1955 the West German Bundesmarine was allowed to commission submarines up to 350 tons for coastal operations. Two classes were designed: the 350-ton Type 201 and the 100-ton Type 202. Pending the completion of the first of these U-boats, the Bundesmarine needed submarines to test the new equipment and to train crews. No submarines could be purchased from foreign navies, so in 1957, two Type XXIIIs and a Type XXI U-boats sunk in 1945 were raised and repaired. In 1959, twelve Type 201 and three Type 202 U-boats were ordered. As both types were designed to be deployed in the Baltic Sea, they were built in non-magnetic steel to protect against magnetic naval mines and magnetic anomaly detectors. By using non-ejectable, non-reloadable torpedo tubes which needed much less space because of smaller fittings and the absence of compensation trim tanks, it was possible to mount eight tubes in the small Type 201. The Type 202 was even smaller and equipped with two torpedo tubes.

The first three Type 201 U-boats were commissioned in 1962. To continue the U-boat tradition, the new boats received the classic "U" designation starting with U-1. In 1962, a redefinition of the tonnage calculation to include solid ballast meant the Type 201 would displace 395 tons. Consequently, tonnage limits established in the London and Paris Conferences were increased to 450 tons for current submarines and future U-boats limited to 1,000 tons. During construction of the first U-boats, it became apparent that an extra sonar needed to be installed. Since the Type 201 was constructed in sections, it was easy to enlarge the hull with an extra 1.8-meter section to accommodate the sonar. This extra section increased displacement to 420 tons, remaining well-within conference limits. Deemed the Type 205, five of these enlarged vessels would be completed by the end of 1963.

=== Type 206 and 207 ===
In 1962, Norway placed an order for fifteen coastal submarines. In order to train crews, U-3 was loaned to the Norwegian Navy, between 10 July 1962 and 20 June 1964, she was named HNoMS Kobben. The fifteen U-boats built between 1963 and 1967 had a high-tension steel hull for increased diving depth and were classified as Type 207. The Danish Navy bought the licences to build two coastal submarines based on the Type 205 plans in 1965. Due to complications with the installation of Danish equipment in these designs, construction was not completed until 1970.

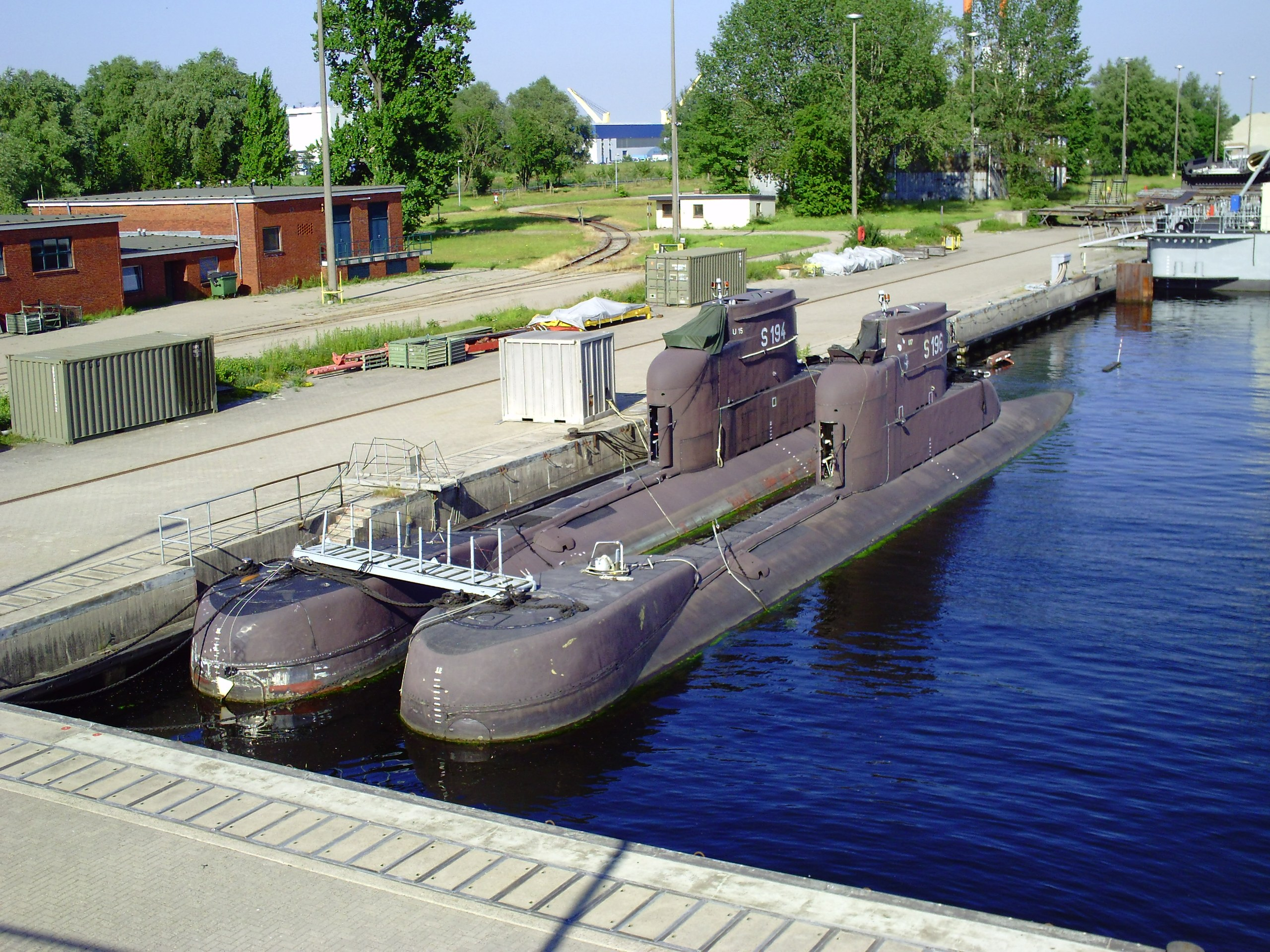
The Type 206 U-15 and U-17.

By 1963, it became obvious that the new non-magnetic steel had corrosion problems when small cracks began to form in the pressure hull. Whilst U-3 continued training and testing in the Norwegian Navy, U-1 and U-2 were laid up. The five U-boats U-4 to U-8 received zinc paint coating to protect the hull, but nevertheless had to undergo regular testing of their maximum diving depth. Eventually, these five U-boats were assigned to the U-boat Training Group. Two new hulls in classic magnetic steel were built, and as much as possible equipment of the old Type 201 U-1 and U-2 was recovered for these new type 205 U-boats, which received the same identification U-1 and U-2. Meanwhile, the German Navy found little use for the two ordered Type 202 U-boats had been completed by 1965; these U-boats did not receive an official U-boat number but were named Hans Techel and Friedrich Schürer. They were only in service with the Test Centre of U-boats until end of 1966. The last four U-boats U-9 to U-12, from the original order of twelve U-boats were constructed with new non-magnetic steel which delayed their delivery to the Navy until 1967–1969.

=== Type 209 and variants ===
In 1968, the German Navy ordered twelve more coastal submarines, named U-13 to U-24. The Type 205 design was again enlarged, accommodating extra batteries to feed the ever-increasing array of electronics. This resulted in the 450-ton Type 206. A further six of these U-boats named U-25 to U-30 were ordered in 1970 to replace the six faulty U-boats U-3 to U-8. The German Navy wanted to order six larger Type 208 submarine-hunter U-boats, and although permission was obtained from the Western European Union for construction up to 1,000 tons, this order was never placed because there were financial burdens with the fiasco of the nonmagnetic U-boats and since a diesel-electric submarine was too slow as a submarine hunter for nuclear propelled submarines.

Having secured the permission to build larger submarines, the Type 209 diesel-electric submarine was designed as a much larger Type 205, with the same characteristics and armament, but with much larger battery capacity, the possibility for torpedo reloads and extra sensors. It was proposed as a very customizable export-sales submarine, available in five variants with a displacement between 1,000 and 1,500 tons. The first customer was the Hellenic Navy, which received four Type 209's in 1971–72. As of 2002, fifty-one boats had been built for thirteen navies, with another twelve still ordered. In 1974, three 540 tons U-boats were built for the Israeli Navy. Based both on the type 206 and as a smaller Type 209, these three U-boats were classified as the Type 540. For political reasons these U-boats were not built in Germany but by Vickers Limited in England. In 1982, the Norwegian Navy ordered six 1,000 tons U-boats, to replace half of the Kobben-class submarines, these were classified as the Type 210. After receiving two Type 209 U-boats in 1974, the Argentine Navy ordered six larger 2,000 tons TR-1700 U-boats in 1977. Two of these were built in Germany and delivered after the Falklands War in 1984–85, the remaining four were to be built in Argentina, but these were never completed. In the early 1990s, Israel ordered three 1,565 tons submarines which were enlarged versions of the Type 209 but resembled more the later Type 212. The first three submarines were delivered in 1999–2000 as the Dolphin-class or Type 800.

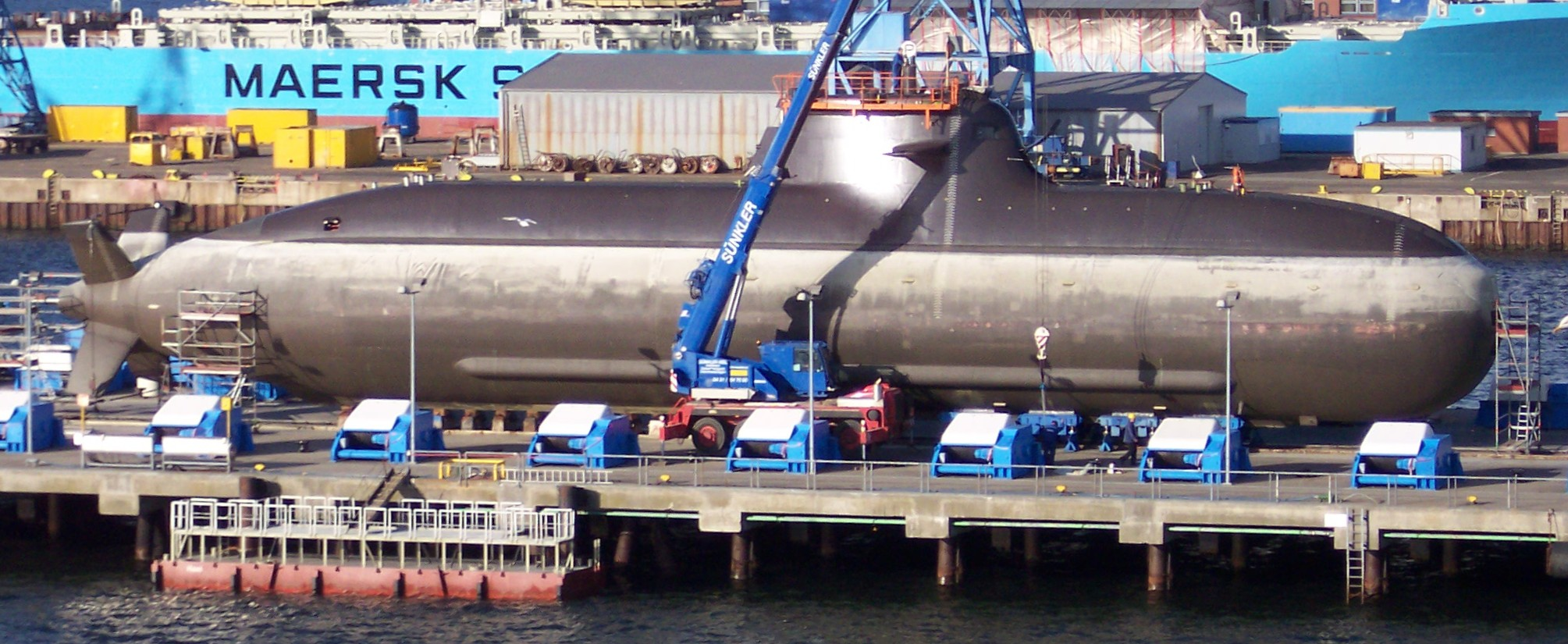
Type 212 submarine with air-independent propulsion of the German Navy in dock at HDW/Kiel

=== Type 212 and variants ===
In 1998, Germany started to construct the first of six Type 212 U-boats. Before the first was launched, two were ordered by Italy, and Greece ordered four enlarged Type 212 U-boats, which were classified as Type 214. Between 2005 and 2007, the four Type 212 U-31, U-32, U-33 and U-34 were commissioned in the German Navy and two in the Italian Navy. In 2015–2016, a further two Type 212 U-35 and U-36 were delivered to the German Navy, and in 2016–2017, the Italian Navy commissioned also two more Type 212. The Type 212 features an air-independent propulsion system using hydrogen fuel cells. While the Type 212 is also being purchased by Norway, the Type 214 has been designed as the follow-on export model. Nine Type 214s have been sold to South Korea and were delivered between 2007 and 2020. Two were delivered to Portugal as Type U 209PN sub-class U-boats in 2010–2011. Six Type 214s were ordered by Turkey in 2011 as the Reis-class for construction at the Gölcük Naval Shipyard. The first was commissioned in 2024.

The Type 216 was a design for a 4,000 tons U-boat with a much larger endurance. It was proposed to but was not bought by Australia. As of 2025, no Type 216s have been ordered. Between 2022 and 2024, Germany built four 2,000 tons Type 218 U-boats for the Republic of Singapore Navy, which are based on the Type 212 and Type 214, with the same propulsion method and 'X' rudder, but armed with eight torpedo tubes.

== See also ==
- List of U-boats never deployed
- List of successful U-boats
- List of U-boats of Germany
- Austro-Hungarian U-boat classes
- I-boat, Japanese equivalent
- List of Knight's Cross recipients of the U-boat service
- Möltenort U-Boat Memorial
- Operation Regenbogen (U-boat)
- Das Boot, 1981 German U-boat film
- Aces of the Deep, 1994 U-boat simulator
  - Silent Hunter II, second of a series
  - Silent Hunter III, third of a series
- Uboat, 2024 U-boat simulator
