= U of I =

U of I may refer to:

in Austria

- University of Innsbruck

in Indonesia

- University of Indonesia

in Nigeria

- University of Ibadan

in the United States of America

- University of Idaho
- University of Illinois Urbana-Champaign
- University of Indianapolis
- University of Iowa

== See also ==
- UI (disambiguation)
