= German submarine U-149 =

U-149 may refer to one of the following German submarines:

- SM U-149, a Type U 142 submarine launched during World War I but unfinished at the end of the war; broken up incomplete 1919–20
  - During the First World War, Germany also had this submarine with a similar name:
    - SM UB-149, a Type UB III submarine launched in 1918; broken up in 1922
- German submarine U-149 (1940), a Type IID submarine that served in the Second World War; taken to Loch Ryan on 30 June 1945; sunk on 21 December 1945 as a part of Operation Deadlight
