= 1U =

1U may refer to:

- ITA Software (IATA code)
- 1U, a rack unit measurement
  - 1U server; see Pizza box form factor
- RS-1U, a type of K-5 (missile)
- J-1U, a model of Auster Workmaster
- SSH 1U (WA); see Washington State Route 503
- An abbreviation for 1 Utama
- An abbreviation for "One Union" or "One Big Union", a concept and slogan used by industrial unionists, including the IWW. #1U is used also as a hashtag on social media by labor activists and organizations.
- basic CubeSat size unit

== See also ==
- U1 (disambiguation)
