= German submarine U-18 =

U-18 may refer to one of the following German submarines:

- SM U-18, was a Type U 17 submarine launched in 1912 and that served in the First World War until sunk on 23 November 1914
  - During the First World War, Germany also had these submarines with similar names:
    - SM UB-18, a Type UB II submarine launched in 1915 and sunk 9 December 1917
    - SM UC-18, a Type UC II submarine launched in 1916 and sunk 19 February 1917
    - SM UC-14, a Type UC I submarine; while in Austro-Hungarian service, she was renamed U-18
- German submarine U-18 (1935), a Type IIB submarine that served in the Second World War and was scuttled on 25 August 1944
- German submarine U-18 (S197), a Type 206 submarine of the Bundesmarine that was launched in 1973 and sold to Colombia after decommissioning in 2011 for spare parts.
