= List of Knight's Cross of the Iron Cross recipients of the U-boat service =

The Knight's Cross of the Iron Cross (German: Ritterkreuz des Eisernen Kreuzes) and its variants were the highest military award in Nazi Germany. Recipients are grouped by grades of the Knight's Cross. During or shortly after World War II, 145 German sailors and officers of the U-boat service as part of the Kriegsmarine received the Knight's Cross of the Iron Cross. Among them, 29 officers received the Knight's Cross of the Iron Cross with Oak Leaves (Ritterkreuz des Eisernen Kreuzes mit Eichenlaub), five the Knight's Cross of the Iron Cross with Oak Leaves and Swords (Ritterkreuz des Eisernen Kreuzes mit Eichenlaub und Schwertern), and two won the Knight's Cross of the Iron Cross with Oak Leaves Swords and Diamonds (Ritterkreuz des Eisernen Kreuzes mit Eichenlaub, Schwertern und Brillanten). Of these, 144 presentations were formally made and one recipient received the award after 11 May 1945, when Großadmiral Karl Dönitz ordered a cease of all promotions and illegalized all subsequent awards. The final recipient is therefore considered to have received the medal without legal authority.

== Background ==
The Knight's Cross of the Iron Cross and its higher grades were based on four separate enactments. The first enactment, Reichsgesetzblatt I S. 1573 of 1 September 1939 instituted the Iron Cross (Eisernes Kreuz), the Knight's Cross of the Iron Cross and the Grand Cross of the Iron Cross (Großkreuz des Eisernen Kreuzes). Article 2 of the enactment mandated that the award of a higher class be preceded by the award of all preceding classes. As the war progressed, some of the recipients of the Knight's Cross distinguished themselves further and a higher grade, the Knight's Cross of the Iron Cross with Oak Leaves (Ritterkreuz des Eisernen Kreuzes mit Eichenlaub), was instituted. The Oak Leaves, as they were commonly referred to, were based on the enactment Reichsgesetzblatt I S. 849 of 3 June 1940. In 1941, two higher grades of the Knight's Cross were instituted. The enactment Reichsgesetzblatt I S. 613 of 28 September 1941 introduced the Knight's Cross of the Iron Cross with Oak Leaves and Swords (Ritterkreuz des Eisernen Kreuzes mit Eichenlaub und Schwertern) and the Knight's Cross of the Iron Cross with Oak Leaves, Swords and Diamonds (Ritterkreuz des Eisernen Kreuzes mit Eichenlaub, Schwertern und Brillanten). At the end of 1944 the final grade, the Knight's Cross of the Iron Cross with Golden Oak Leaves, Swords, and Diamonds (Ritterkreuz des Eisernen Kreuzes mit goldenem Eichenlaub, Schwertern und Brillanten), based on the enactment Reichsgesetzblatt 1945 I S. 11 of 29 December 1944, became the final variant of the Knight's Cross authorized.

== Recipients ==
The Oberkommando der Wehrmacht kept separate Knight's Cross lists, one for each of the three military branches, Heer (Army), Kriegsmarine (Navy), Luftwaffe (Air force) and for the Waffen-SS. Within each of these lists a unique sequential number was assigned to each recipient. The same numbering paradigm was applied to the higher grades of the Knight's Cross, one list per grade.

This along with the * (asterisk), indicates that the Knight's Cross was awarded posthumously.

=== Knight's Cross with Oak Leaves, Swords and Diamonds ===
The Knight's Cross with Oak Leaves, Swords and Diamonds is based on the enactment Reichsgesetzblatt I S. 613 of 28 September 1941 to reward those servicemen who had already been awarded the Oak Leaves with Swords to the Knight's Cross of the Iron Cross. Ultimately, it would be awarded to twenty-seven German soldiers, sailors and airmen, ranging from young fighter pilots to field marshals. Two recipients were members of the U-boat arm.

Number	Name	Rank	Unit	Date of award	Notes
7	Wolfgang Lüth	Fregattenkapitän	Commander of U-181	9 August 1943	killed on active service 13 May 1945
22	Albrecht Brandi	Fregattenkapitän	Commander of U-967	24 November 1944	—

=== Knight's Cross with Oak Leaves and Swords ===
The Knight's Cross with Oak Leaves and Swords is also based on the enactment Reichsgesetzblatt I S. 613 of 28 September 1941 to reward those servicemen who had already been awarded the Oak Leaves to the Knight's Cross of the Iron Cross.

Number	Name	Rank	Unit	Date of award	Notes
5	Otto Kretschmer	Korvettenkapitän	Commander of U-99	26 December 1941	—
17	Erich Topp	Kapitänleutnant	Commander of U-552	17 August 1942	—
18	Reinhard Suhren	Kapitänleutnant	Commander of U-564	1 September 1942	—
29	Wolfgang Lüth	Korvettenkapitän	Commander of U-181	15 April 1943	Awarded 7th Diamonds 9 August 1943
66	Albrecht Brandi	Fregattenkapitän	Commander of U-380	9 May 1944	Awarded 22nd Diamonds 24 November 1944

=== Knight's Cross with Oak Leaves ===
The Knight's Cross with Oak Leaves was based on the enactment Reichsgesetzblatt I S. 849 of 3 June 1940. The last officially announced number for the Oak Leaves was 843. Higher numbers are unofficial and therefore denoted in brackets.

Number	Name	Rank	Unit	Date of award	Notes
5	Günther Prien	Kapitänleutnant	Commander of U-47	20 October 1940	missing in action 7 March 1941
6	Otto Kretschmer	Kapitänleutnant	Commander of U-99	4 November 1940	Awarded 5th Swords 26 December 1941
7	Joachim Schepke	Kapitänleutnant	Commander of U-100	1 December 1940	killed in action 17 March 1941
13	Heinrich Liebe	Kapitänleutnant	Commander of U-38	10 June 1941	At the same time promoted to Korvettenkapitän
14	Engelbert Endrass	Oberleutnant zur See (Note: According to Scherzer as Kapitänleutnant.)	Commander of U-46	10 June 1941	killed in action 21 December 1941
15	Herbert Schultze	Kapitänleutnant	Commander of U-48	12 June 1941	—
23	Viktor Hermann Otto Schütze	Korvettenkapitän	Commander of U-103	14 July 1941	—
51	Heinrich Lehmann-Willenbrock	Kapitänleutnant	Commander of U-96	31 December 1941	—
56	Reinhard Suhren	Oberleutnant zur See	Commander of U-564	31 December 1941	Awarded 18th Swords 1 September 1942
87	Erich Topp	Kapitänleutnant	Commander of U-552	11 April 1942	Awarded 17th Swords 17 August 1942
89	Reinhard Hardegen	Kapitänleutnant	Commander of U-123	23 April 1942	—
104	Rolf Mützelburg	Kapitänleutnant	Commander of U-203	15 July 1942	killed on active service 11 September 1942
105	Adalbert Schnee	Kapitänleutnant	Commander of U-201	15 July 1942	—
123	Klaus Scholtz	Korvettenkapitän	Commander of U-108	10 September 1942	—
125	Heinrich Bleichrodt	Kapitänleutnant	Commander of U-109	23 September 1942	—
142	Wolfgang Lüth	Kapitänleutnant	Commander of U-181	13 November 1942	Awarded 29th Swords 15 April 1943; 7th Diamonds 9 August 1943
147	Karl-Friedrich Merten	Korvettenkapitän	Commander of U-68	16 November 1942	—
171	Friedrich Guggenberger	Kapitänleutnant	Commander of U-81	8 January 1943	—
177	Johann Mohr	Kapitänleutnant	Commander of U-124	13 January 1943	killed in action 3 April 1943
208	Georg Lassen	Kapitänleutnant	Commander of U-160	7 March 1943	—
223	Karl Dönitz	Großadmiral	Oberbefehlshaber der Kriegsmarine and Befehlshaber der U-Boote	6 April 1943	—
224	Albrecht Brandi	Korvettenkapitän	Commander of U-617	11 April 1943	Awarded 66th Swords 9 May 1944; 22nd Diamonds 24 November 1944
234	Otto von Bülow	Kapitänleutnant	Commander of U-404	26 April 1943	—
250	Robert Gysae	Kapitänleutnant	Commander of U-177	31 May 1943	—
256	Carl Emmermann	Kapitänleutnant	Commander of U-172	4 July 1943	—
257	Werner Henke	Kapitänleutnant	Commander of U-515	4 July 1943	killed as prisoner of war on 15 June 1944
645	Werner Hartmann	Kapitän zur See	Leader of the U-Boote in the Mediterranean Sea, before commander of U-198	5 November 1944	—
(852)	Rolf Thomsen	Kapitänleutnant	Commander of U-1202	29 April 1945	—
(853)	Hans-Günther Lange	Kapitänleutnant	Commander of U-711	29 April 1945	—

=== Knight's Cross of the Iron Cross ===
The Knight's Cross of the Iron Cross is based on the enactment Reichsgesetzblatt I S. 1573 of 1 September 1939 Verordnung über die Erneuerung des Eisernen Kreuzes (Regulation of the renewing of the Iron Cross).

Number	Name	Rank	Unit	Date of award	Notes
1	Günther Prien	Kapitänleutnant	Commander of U-47	18 October 1939	Awarded 5th Oak Leaves 20 October 1940
2	Herbert Schultze	Kapitänleutnant	Commander of U-48	1 March 1940	Awarded 15th Oak Leaves 12 June 1941
3	Karl Dönitz	Konteradmiral	Befehlshaber der U-Boote (B.d.U.)	21 April 1940	Awarded 223rd Oak Leaves 6 April 1943
4	Werner Hartmann	Korvettenkapitän	Commander of U-37	9 May 1940	Awarded 645th Oak Leaves 5 November 1944
5	Otto Schuhart	Kapitänleutnant	Commander of U-29	16 May 1940	—
6	Wilhelm Rollmann	Kapitänleutnant	Commander of U-34	31 July 1940	killed in action 5 November 1943
7	Otto Kretschmer	Kapitänleutnant	Commander of U-99	4 August 1940	Awarded 6th Oak Leaves 4 November 1940; 5th Swords 26 December 1941
8	Heinrich Liebe	Kapitänleutnant	Commander of U-38	14 August 1940	Awarded 13th Oak Leaves 10 June 1941
9	Fritz-Julius Lemp	Kapitänleutnant	Commander of U-30	14 August 1940	killed in action 9 May 1941
10	Hans-Rudolf Rösing	Korvettenkapitän	Chief of the 7. Unterseebootsflottille and commander of U-48	29 August 1940	—
11	Fritz Frauenheim	Kapitänleutnant	Commander of U-101	29 August 1940	—
12	Engelbert Endrass	Oberleutnant zur See	Commander of U-46	5 September 1940	Awarded 14th Oak Leaves 10 June 1941
13	Günter Kuhnke	Kapitänleutnant	Commander of U-28	19 September 1940	—
14	Joachim Schepke	Kapitänleutnant	Commander of U-100	24 September 1940	Awarded 7th Oak Leaves 1 December 1940
15	Hans Jenisch	Oberleutnant zur See	Commander of U-32	7 October 1940	—
16	Victor Oehrn	Kapitänleutnant	Commander of U-37	21 October 1940	—
17	Gerd Suhren	Oberleutnant (Ing.)	Chief engineer on U-37	21 October 1940	—
18	Heinrich Bleichrodt	Kapitänleutnant	Commander of U-48	24 October 1940	Awarded 125th Oak Leaves 23 September 1942
19	Wolfgang Lüth	Oberleutnant zur See	Commander of U-138	24 October 1940	Awarded 142nd Oak Leaves 13 November 1942; 29th Swords 15 April 1943; 7th Diamonds 9 August 1943
20	Reinhard Suhren	Oberleutnant zur See	1st watch officer on U-48	3 November 1940	Awarded 56th Oak Leaves 31 December 1941; 18th Swords 1 September 1942
21	Heinrich Petersen	Stabsobersteuermann	Watch officer and coxswain on U-99	5 November 1940	—
22	Viktor Schütze	Korvettenkapitän	Commander of U-103	11 December 1940	Awarded 23rd Oak Leaves 14 July 1941
23	Hans-Gerrit von Stockhausen	Korvettenkapitän	Commander of U-65	14 January 1941	—
24	Karl-Heinz Moehle	Kapitänleutnant	Commander of U-123	26 February 1941	—
25	Heinrich Lehmann-Willenbrock	Kapitänleutnant	Commander of U-96	26 February 1941	Awarded 51st Oak Leaves 31 December 1941
26	Jürgen Oesten	Kapitänleutnant	Commander of U-106	26 March 1941	—
27	Georg-Wilhelm Schulz	Kapitänleutnant	Commander of U-124	4 April 1941	—
28	Erich Zürn	Oberleutnant (Ing.)	Chief engineer on U-48	23 April 1941	—
29	Herbert Kuppisch	Kapitänleutnant	Commander of U-94	14 May 1941	killed in action 27 August 1943
30	Herbert Wohlfarth	Kapitänleutnant	Commander of U-556	15 May 1941	—
31	Georg Schewe	Kapitänleutnant	Commander of U-105	23 May 1941	—
32	Claus Korth	Kapitänleutnant	Commander of U-93	29 May 1941	—
33	Erich Topp	Oberleutnant zur See	Commander of U-552	20 June 1941	Awarded 87th Oak Leaves 11 April 1942; 17th Swords 17 August 1942
34	Günter Hessler	Kapitänleutnant	Commander of U-107	24 June 1941	—
35	Jost Metzler	Kapitänleutnant	Commander of U-69	28 July 1941	—
36	Adalbert Schnee	Oberleutnant zur See	Commander of U-201	30 August 1941	Awarded 105th Oak Leaves 15 July 1942
37	Rolf Mützelburg	Kapitänleutnant	Commander of U-203	17 November 1941	Awarded 104th Oak Leaves 15 July 1942
38	Ernst Mengersen	Kapitänleutnant	Commander of U-101	18 November 1941	—
39	Friedrich Guggenberger	Kapitänleutnant	Commander of U-81	10 December 1941	Awarded 171st Oak Leaves 8 January 1943
40	Klaus Scholtz	Kapitänleutnant	Commander of U-108	26 December 1941	Awarded 123rd Oak Leaves 10 September 1942
41	Gerhard Bigalk	Kapitänleutnant	Commander of U-751	26 December 1941	killed in action 17 July 1942
42	Eitel-Friedrich Kentrat	Kapitänleutnant	Commander of U-74	31 December 1941	—
43	Robert Gysae	Kapitänleutnant	Commander of U-98	31 December 1941	Awarded 250th Oak Leaves 31 May 1943
44	Reinhard Hardegen	Kapitänleutnant	Commander of U-123	23 January 1942	Awarded 89th Oak Leaves 23 April 1942
45	Hans-Diedrich Freiherr von Tiesenhausen	Kapitänleutnant	Commander of U-331	27 January 1942	—
46	Nicolai Clausen	Kapitänleutnant	Commander of U-129	13 March 1942	killed in action 16 May 1943
47	Ernst Bauer	Kapitänleutnant	Commander of U-126	16 March 1942	—
48	Johann Mohr	Kapitänleutnant	Commander of U-124	27 March 1942	Awarded 177th Oak Leaves 13 January 1943
49	Otto Ites	Oberleutnant zur See	Commander of U-94	28 March 1942	—
50	Robert-Richard Zapp	Korvettenkapitän	Commander of U-66	23 April 1942	—
51	Werner Winter	Kapitänleutnant	Commander of U-103	5 June 1942	—
52	Peter-Erich Cremer	Kapitänleutnant	Commander of U-333	5 June 1942	—
53	Karl-Friedrich Merten	Korvettenkapitän	Commander of U-68	13 June 1942	Awarded 147th Oak Leaves 16 November 1942
54	Hans-Werner Kraus	Kapitänleutnant	Commander of U-83	19 June 1942	—
55	Erwin Rostin	Kapitänleutnant	Commander of U-158	28 June 1942	—
56	Heinz-Otto Schultze	Kapitänleutnant	Commander of U-432	9 July 1942	killed in action 25 November 1943
57	Georg Lassen	Oberleutnant zur See	Commander of U-160	10 August 1942	Awarded 208th Oak Leaves 7 March 1943
58	Helmut Rosenbaum	Kapitänleutnant	Commander of U-73	12 August 1942	—
59	Adolf Piening	Kapitänleutnant	Commander of U-155	13 August 1942	—
60	Heinrich Schonder	Kapitänleutnant	Commander of U-77	19 August 1942	killed in action 28 June 1943
61	Karl Thurmann	Korvettenkapitän	Commander of U-553	24 August 1942	missing in action 28 January 1943
62	Ernst Kals	Korvettenkapitän	Commander of U-130	1 September 1942	—
63	Werner Hartenstein	Korvettenkapitän	Commander of U-156	17 September 1942	killed in action 8 March 1943
64	Günther Krech	Kapitänleutnant	Commander of U-558	17 September 1942	—
65	Otto von Bülow	Kapitänleutnant	Commander of U-404	20 October 1942	Awarded 234th Oak Leaves 26 April 1943
66	Helmut Witte	Kapitänleutnant	Commander of U-159	22 October 1942	—
67	Siegfried Strelow	Kapitänleutnant	Commander of U-435	27 October 1942	killed in action 15 July 1943
68	Fritz Poske	Korvettenkapitän	Commander of U-504	6 November 1942	—
69	Carl Emmermann	Kapitänleutnant	Commander of U-172	27 November 1942	Awarded 256th Oak Leaves 4 July 1943
70	Günther Müller-Stöckheim	Kapitänleutnant	Commander of U-67	27 November 1942	killed in action 16 July 1943
71	Wilhelm Dommes	Kapitänleutnant	Commander of U-431	2 December 1942	—
72	Hans Witt	Kapitänleutnant	Commander of U-129	17 December 1942	—
73	Werner Henke	Oberleutnant zur See zur Verwendung (for disposition)	Commander of U-515	17 December 1942	Awarded 257th Oak Leaves 4 July 1943
74	Hermann Rasch	Kapitänleutnant	Commander of U-106	29 December 1942	—
75	Harro Schacht	Korvettenkapitän	Commander of U-507	9 January 1943	killed in action 14 January 1943
76	Albrecht Achilles	Kapitänleutnant	Commander of U-161	16 January 1943	killed in action 27 September 1943
77	Herbert Schneider	Kapitänleutnant	Commander of U-522	16 January 1943	killed in action 24 February 1943
78	Ulrich Heyse	Kapitänleutnant	Commander of U-128	21 January 1943	—
79	Albrecht Brandi	Kapitänleutnant	Commander of U-617	21 January 1943	Awarded 224th Oak Leaves 11 April 1943; 66th Swords 9 May 1944; 22nd Diamonds 24 November 1944
80	Siegfried Freiherr von Forstner	Kapitänleutnant	Commander of U-402	9 February 1943	killed in action 13 October 1943 (Note: Some sources indicating that von Forstner succumbed to his injuries aboard USS Card on 22 October 1943 have been found incorrect.)
81	Gerhard Bielig	Kapitänleutnant (Ing.)	Chief engineer on U-177	10 February 1943	—
82	Erich Würdemann	Kapitänleutnant	Commander of U-506	14 March 1943	killed in action 14 July 1943
83	Reinhart Reche	Kapitänleutnant	Commander of U-255	17 March 1943	—
84	Hans-Hartwig Trojer	Oberleutnant zur See	Commander of U-221	24 March 1943	—
85	Harald Gelhaus	Kapitänleutnant	Commander of U-107	26 March 1943	—
86	Karl Neitzel	Korvettenkapitän	Commander of U-510	27 March 1943	—
87	Günther Seibicke	Kapitänleutnant	Commander of U-436	27 March 1943	killed in action 26 May 1943
88	Ulrich Folkers	Kapitänleutnant	Commander of U-125	27 March 1943	killed in action 6 May 1943
89	Hans Heidtmann	Kapitänleutnant	Commander of U-559	12 April 1943	—
90	Helmut Möhlmann	Kapitänleutnant	Commander of U-571	16 April 1943	—
91	Gunter Jahn	Kapitänleutnant	Commander of U-596	30 April 1943	—
92	Wilhelm Franken	Kapitänleutnant	Commander of U-565	30 April 1943	killed in accident 13 January 1945
93	Klaus Bargsten	Kapitänleutnant	Commander of U-521	30 April 1943	—
94	Günther Heydemann	Kapitänleutnant	Commander of U-575	3 July 1943	—
95	Friedrich Markworth	Kapitänleutnant	Commander of U-66	8 July 1943	—
96	Georg Staats	Kapitänleutnant	Commander of U-508	14 July 1943	killed in action 12 November 1943
97	Gerd Kelbling	Kapitänleutnant	Commander of U-593	18 August 1943	—
98	Herbert Panknin	Kapitänleutnant (Ing.)	Chief engineer on U-106	4 September 1943	
99	Dipl.-Ing. Willi Lechtenbörger*	Oberleutnant (Ing.) of the Reserves	Chief engineer on U-847	4 September 1943	killed in action 27 August 1943
100	Heinz Krey*	Leutnant (Ing.)	Chief engineer on U-752	4 September 1943	killed in action 23 May 1943
101	August Maus	Kapitänleutnant	Commander of U-185	21 September 1943	—
102	Dietrich Schöneboom	Oberleutnant zur See	Commander of U-431	20 October 1943	killed in action 23 October 1943
103	Carl-August Landfermann	Oberleutnant (Ing.) of the Reserve	Chief engineer on U-181	27 October 1943	—
104	Hellmut Rohweder	Kapitänleutnant (Ing.)	Chief engineer on U-69 and U-514	14 November 1943	—
105	Egon-Reiner Freiherr von Schlippenbach	Kapitänleutnant	Commander of U-453	19 November 1943	—
106	Horst-Arno Fenski	Oberleutnant zur See	Commander of U-410	26 November 1943	—
107	Heinz Franke	Kapitänleutnant	Commander of U-262	30 November 1943	—
108	Max-Martin Teichert*	Kapitänleutnant	Commander of U-456	19 December 1943*	killed in action 12 May 1943
109	Siegfried Koitschka	Oberleutnant zur See	Commander of U-616	27 January 1944	—
110	Hans-Jürgen Hellriegel	Kapitänleutnant	Commander of U-543	3 February 1944	killed in action 2 July 1944
111	Siegfried Lüdden	Kapitänleutnant	Commander of U-188	11 February 1944	killed on active service 13 January 1945
112	Johann-Friedrich Wessels	Kapitänleutnant (Ing.)	Chief engineer on U-198	9 March 1944	—
113	Gustav Poel	Kapitänleutnant	Commander of U-413	21 March 1944	—
114	Waldemar Mehl	Kapitänleutnant	Commander of U-371	28 March 1944	—
115	Alfred Eick	Oberleutnant zur See	Commander of U-510	31 March 1944	—
116	Georg Olschewski	Oberleutnant (Ing.)	Chief engineer on U-66	23 April 1944	—
117	Walter Käding	Obersteuermann	3rd watch officer and coxswain on U-123	15 May 1944	—
118	Horst Hofmann	Obersteuermann	Coxswain and watch officer on U-672	20 May 1944	—
119	Karl-Heinz Wiebe	Kapitänleutnant (Ing.)	Chief engineer on U-178	22 May 1944	—
120	Horst von Schroeter	Oberleutnant zur See	Commander of U-123	1 June 1944	—
—	Johann-Otto Krieg	Oberleutnant zur See	Chief of the Kleinkampfmittel-Flottille 361	8 July 1944	—
121	Reinhard König	Oberleutnant (Ing.)	Chief engineer on U-123	8 July 1944	—
122	Heinz Sieder	Oberleutnant zur See	Commander of U-984	8 July 1944	killed in action 20 August 1944
123	Karl Fleige	Oberleutnant zur See	Commander of U-18	18 July 1944	—
124	Karl-Heinz Marbach	Oberleutnant zur See	Commander of U-953	22 July 1944	—
125	Hermann Stuckmann	Oberleutnant zur See	Commander of U-621	11 August 1944	killed in action 23 August 1944
126	Heinrich Dammeier	Stabsobermaschinist	Chief mechanic on U-270	12 August 1944	—
127	Hans-Günther Lange	Kapitänleutnant	Commander of U-711	26 August 1944	Awarded (853rd) Oak Leaves 29 April 1945
128	Heinrich Timm	Korvettenkapitän	Commander of U-862	17 September 1944	—
129	Gerhard Schaar	Oberleutnant zur See	Commander of U-957	1 October 1944	—
130	Hans-Joachim Förster	Oberleutnant zur See	Commander of U-480	18 December 1944	killed in action 24 February 1945
131	Paul Brasack	Kapitänleutnant	Commander of U-737	30 October 1944	—
132	Rudolf Mühlbauer	Oberbootsmannsmaat	Brückenmaat (look out on the bridge) on U-123	10 December 1944	—
133	Günther Pulst	Oberleutnant zur See	Commander of U-978	21 December 1944	—
134	Rolf Thomsen	Kapitänleutnant	Commander of U-1202	4 January 1945	Awarded (852nd) Oak Leaves 29 April 1945
135	Ernst Hechler	Korvettenkapitän	Commander of U-870	21 January 1945	—
136	Dr. jur. Kurt Dobratz	Kapitän zur See	Commander of U-1232	23 January 1945	—
137	Johannes Limbach	Leutnant zur See	1st watch officer on U-181	6 February 1945	—
138	Hans-Georg Hess	Oberleutnant zur See of the Reserves	Commander of U-995	11 February 1945	—
139	Otto Westphalen	Oberleutnant zur See	Commander of U-968	23 March 1945	—
140	Philipp Lichtenberg	Kapitänleutnant (Ing.)	Chief engineer on U-516	31 March 1945	—
141	Hans Johannsen	Oberleutnant (Ing.)	Chief engineer on U-802	31 March 1945	—
142	Heinrich Praßdorf	Obermaschinist	Lead machinist on U-1203	21 April 1945	—
143	Heinrich Schroeteler	Kapitänleutnant	Commander of U-1023	2 May 1945	—
144	Hans Lehmann	Oberleutnant zur See of the Reserves	Commander of U-997	7 May 1945 (Note: Author Clemens Range dates Hans Lehmann's Knight's Cross on 8 June 1945, thus after the effectiveness of the Dönitz-decree. Walther-Peer Fellgiebel, author of Die Träger des Ritterkreuzes des Eisernen Kreuzes 1939-1945, indicates that Lehmann received the Knight's Cross on 11 May 1945, before the Dönitz-decree prohibited the awarding of the Knight's Cross. The sequential number 317 within the Kriegsmarine, 144 within the U-boat service, associated to Lehmann's Knight's Cross is based on author Clemens Range's work Die Ritterkreuzträger der Kriegsmarine and Busch and Röll's book Der U-Boot-Krieg 1939-1945 - Die Ritterkreuzträger der U-Boot-Waffe von September 1939 bis Mai 1945. Historian Veit Scherzer, whose work Die Ritterkreuzträger Die Inhaber des Ritterkreuzes des Eisernen Kreuzes 1939 von Heer, Luftwaffe, Kriegsmarine, Waffen-SS, Volkssturm sowie mit Deutschland verbündeter Streitkräfte nach den Unterlagen des Bundesarchives is based on the primary data from the German Federal Archives, indicates that the 7 May 1945 is the correct date.)	

== Legally disputed Knight's Cross recipients ==
Großadmiral Karl Dönitz ordered a cease of all promotions and awards as of 11 May 1945. Nevertheless, a number of Knight's Crosses were awarded after this date and are considered "illegal" hand-outs. One sailor of the U-boat service is often listed as a recipient of the Knight's Cross but falls outside of the Dönitz-decree. Karl Jäckel received his Knight's Cross confirmation after 11 May 1945 and is therefore a de facto but not de jure recipient.

Number	Name	Rank	Unit	Date of award	Notes
144	Karl Jäckel	Ober-Steuermann	Coxswain on U-29, U-160 and U-907	1 June 1945	
