= Type U 19 submarine =

German pre-World War I submarine class

Class overview
- Builders: Kaiserliche Werft Danzig
- Operators: Imperial German Navy
- Preceded by: Type U 17
- Succeeded by: Type U 23
- Completed: 4
- Lost: 1

General characteristics
- Displacement: 650 t (640 long tons) surfaced; 837 t (824 long tons) submerged
- Length: 64.15 m (210 ft 6 in)
- Beam: 6.10 m (20 ft 0 in)
- Height: 7.30 m (23 ft 11 in)
- Draught: 3.58 m (11 ft 9 in)
- Propulsion: 2 shafts; 2 × MAN 8-cylinder two stroke diesel motors with 1,700 PS (1,677 bhp; 1,250 kW); 2 × AEG double modyn with 1,200 PS (1,184 shp; 883 kW); 320 rpm submerged
- Speed: 15.4 knots (28.5 km/h; 17.7 mph) surfaced; 9.5 knots (17.6 km/h; 10.9 mph) submerged
- Range: 9,700 nmi (18,000 km; 11,200 mi) at 8 kn surfaced; 80 nmi (150 km; 92 mi) at 5 kn submerged
- Test depth: 50 m (164 ft 1 in)
- Complement: 4 officers, 31 men
- Armament: 4 × 50 cm (19.7 in) torpedo tubes (2 each bow and stern) with 6 torpedoes; 1 × 8.8 cm (3.5 in) SK L/30 gun (from 1916 2 ×) or; 1 × 10.5 cm (4.1 in) SK L/45 gun (from 1917)

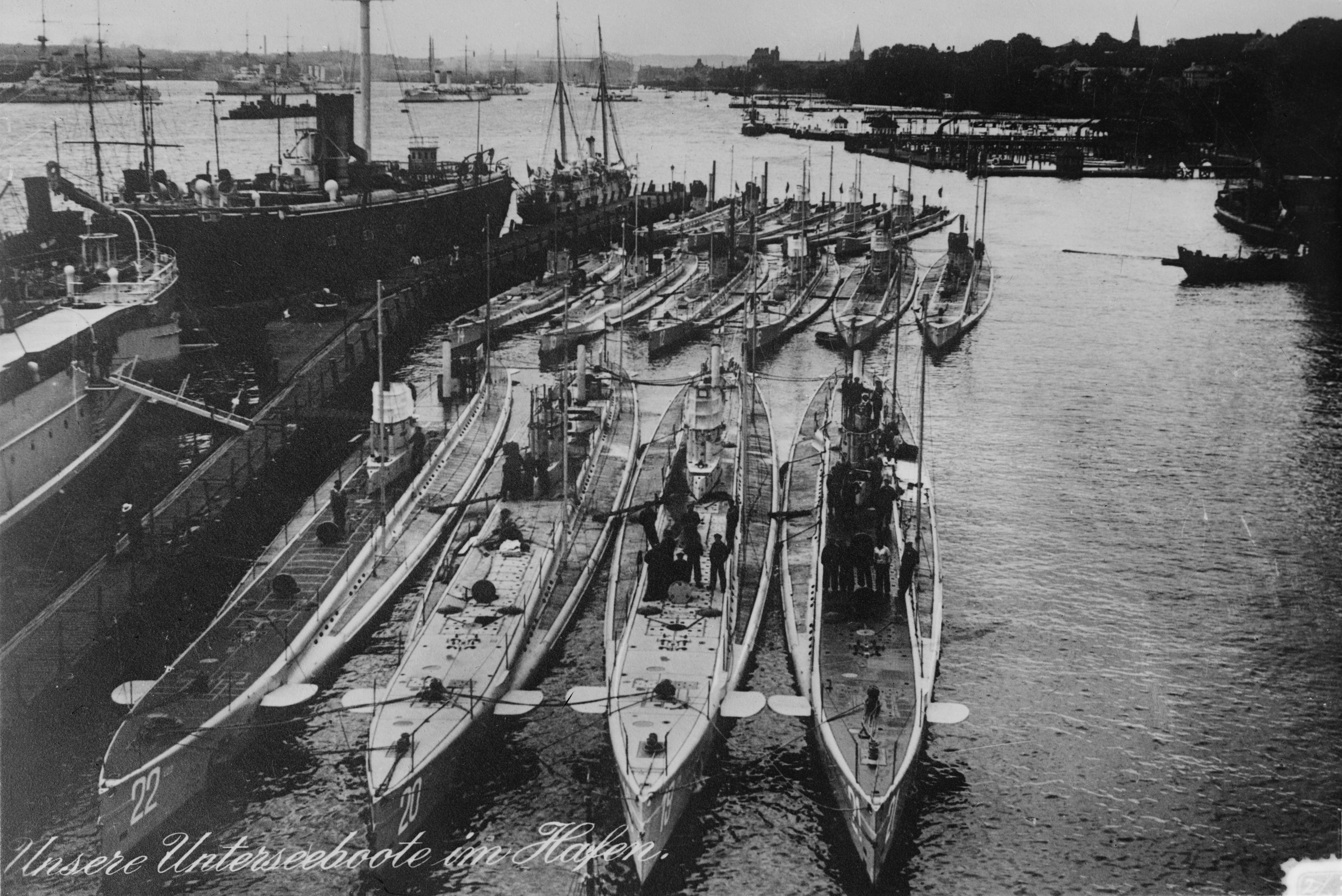
All four Type U 19 submarines (first row)

Type U 19 was a class of U-boats built during World War I by the Kaiserliche Marine. Type U 19 U-boats were the first U-boats with Diesel engines for surface propulsion and charging the batteries for the electrical engines. Originally the preceding Type U 17 submarine was intended to be the first diesel U-boat, but delays in developing these diesel engines meant that these two Type U 17 U-boats received Kerosene engines instead. Other improvements included the change from 45-cm to 50-cm torpedo tubes for launching the G6 torpedo, and the installation of a deck gun.

The four Type 19 U-boats were ordered on 25 November 1910 from the Kaiserliche Werft Danzig shipyard.

== Design ==
Type U 19s had an overall length of 64.15 m (210 ft 6 in) The boats' beam was 6.10 m (20 ft 0 in), the draught was 3.58 m (11 ft 9 in), with a total height of 7.30 m (23 ft 11 in). The boats displaced 650 tonnes (640 long tons) when surfaced and 837 t (824 long tons) when submerged.

Type U 19s were fitted with two MAN 8-cylinder two-stroke diesel engines with a total of 1,700 metric horsepower (1,250 kW; 1,677 bhp) for use on the surface and two AEG double-acting electric motors with a total of 880 kW (1,196 PS; 1,180 shp) for underwater use. These engines powered two shafts, which gave the boats a top surface speed of 15.4 knots (28.5 km/h; 17.7 mph), and 9.5 knots (17.6 km/h; 10.9 mph) when submerged. Cruising range was 9,700 nautical miles (18,000 km; 11,200 mi) at 8 knots (15 km/h; 9.2 mph) on the surface and 80 nautical miles (150 km; 92 mi) at 5 knots (9.3 km/h; 5.8 mph) submerged. Constructional diving depth (Note: Constructional diving depth had a safety factor of 2.5, which meant that crushing depth was 2.5 times construction diving depth.) was 50 m (164 ft 1 in).

The U-boats were armed with four 50 cm (20 in) torpedo tubes, two fitted in the bow and two in the stern, and carried six torpedoes. The boats' complement was 4 officers and 31 enlisted.

== Ships ==
Name	launched	commissioned	merchant ships sunk (nbr / GRT )	warships sunk ( nbr / tons )	Fate
U-19	10 October 1912	6 July 1913	55 / 101.389	none	Surrendered on 24 November 1918. Scrapped in 1919-20 at Blyth
U-20	18 December 1912	5 August 1913	36 / 104.300	none	Stranded on 5 November 1916 at Jutland. Broken up in 1925.
U-21	8 February 1913	22 September 1913	36 / 78.712	4 / 34.440	Sunk 22 February 1919 whilst on her way to internment
U-22	6 March 1913	25 November 1913	44 / 46.365	none	Surrendered on 1 December 1918. Scrapped in 1919-20 at Blyth

== Bibliography ==
- Gröner, Erich (1991). Jung, Dieter; Maass, Martin (eds.). German Warships 1815–1945, U-boats and Mine Warfare Vessels. Vol. 2. London: Conway Maritime Press. ISBN 0-85177-593-4.
- Herzog, Bodo (1993). Deutsche U-Boote : 1906 - 1966 [German U-boats : 1906 - 1966] (in German). Erlangen: Müller. ISBN 9783860700365.
- Möller, Eberhard; Brack, Werner (2004). The Encyclopedia of U-Boats. London: Chatham. ISBN 1-85367-623-3.
- Rössler, Eberhard (1981). The U-boat: The evolution and technical history of German submarines. London: Cassell & Co. ISBN 0-304-36120-8.
