= Small nucleolar RNA SNORD18 =

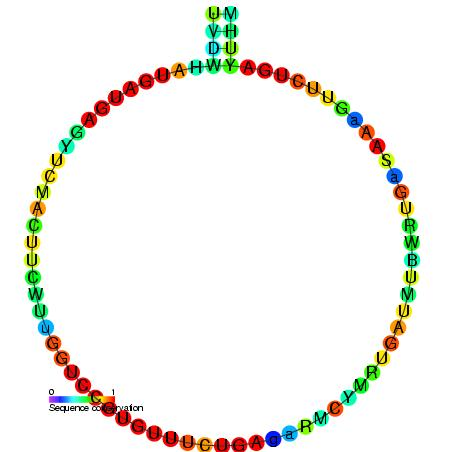
- Predicted secondary structure and sequence conservation of SNORD18

Identifiers
- Symbol: SNORD18
- Alt. Symbols: U18
- Rfam: RF00093

Other data
- RNA type: Gene; snRNA; snoRNA; CD-box
- Domain: Eukaryota
- GO: GO:0006396 GO:0005730
- SO: SO:0000593
- PDB structures: PDBe

In molecular biology, SNORD18 (also known as U18) is a non-coding RNA (ncRNA) molecule which functions in the modification of other small nuclear RNAs (snRNAs). This type of modifying RNA is usually located in the nucleolus of the eukaryotic cell which is a major site of snRNA biogenesis. It is known as a small nucleolar RNA (snoRNA) and also often referred to as a guide RNA.

U18 belongs to the C/D box class of snoRNAs which contain the conserved sequence motifs known as the C box (UGAUGA) and the D box (CUGA). Most of the members of the box C/D family function in directing site-specific 2'-O-methylation of substrate RNAs.

In humans and Xenopus laevis there are three closely related copies of U18 (called U18A, U18B, U18C) which are encoded in introns of ribosomal protein L1. In yeast U18 is located in the introns of Elongation Factor 1 beta (EF1-beta). Related snoRNAs in Arabidopsis thaliana and rice Oryza sativa have been named R63 and Z106 respectively. Factors involved in the processing of the intronic snoRNA have recently been elucidated.
