= Type U 17 submarine =

German pre-World War I submarine class

Class overview
- Builders: Kaiserliche Werft Danzig
- Operators: Imperial German Navy
- Preceded by: U 16
- Succeeded by: Type U 19
- Completed: 2
- Lost: 1

General characteristics
- Displacement: 564 t (555 long tons) surfaced; 691 t (680 long tons) submerged
- Length: 62.35 m (204 ft 7 in)
- Beam: 6 m (19 ft 8 in)
- Height: 7.30 m (23 ft 11 in)
- Draught: 3.40 m (11 ft 2 in)
- Propulsion: 2 shafts; 2 × 2 Körting 8-cylinder two stroke paraffin motors with 1,400 PS (1,000 kW; 1,400 shp); 2 × AEG electric motors with 1,120 PS (820 kW; 1,100 shp); 550 rpm surfaced; 425 rpm submerged
- Speed: 14.9 knots (27.6 km/h; 17.1 mph) surfaced; 9.5 knots (17.6 km/h; 10.9 mph) submerged
- Range: 6,700 nautical miles (12,400 km; 7,700 mi) at 8 knots (15 km/h; 9.2 mph) surfaced; 75 nautical miles (139 km; 86 mi) at 5 knots (9.3 km/h; 5.8 mph) submerged
- Test depth: 50 m (164 ft 1 in)
- Complement: 4 officers, 25 men
- Armament: 4 × 45 cm (17.7 in) torpedo tubes (2 each bow and stern); 6 torpedoes; On U-17 from 1914 : 1 × 3.7 cm (1.5 in) Hotchkiss gun, replaced in 1917 by 1 × 5 cm (2.0 in) SK L/40 gun

Type U 17 was a class of U-boats built during World War I by the Kaiserliche Marine. As from 1908 the Germans were considering U-boats with diesel engines, but pending the development of a sufficient lightweight diesel engine, paraffin engines were used. Type 17 was a design for two diesel engines but when the U-boats were ordered in 1910, the diesel engines were not yet available and instead four paraffin engines were installed.

== Design ==
Type U 17s had an overall length of 62.35 m (204 ft 7 in) The boats' beam was 6.00 m (19 ft 8 in), the draught was 3.40 m (11 ft 2 in), with a total height of 7.30 m (23 ft 11 in). The boats displaced 564 tonnes (555 long tons) when surfaced and 691 t (680 long tons) when submerged.

Type U 17s were fitted with four Körting 8-cylinder two-stroke paraffin engines with a total of 1,400 metric horsepower (1,030 kW; 1,381 bhp) for use on the surface and two AEG double-acting electric motors with a total of 820 kW (1,115 PS; 1,100 shp) for underwater use. These engines powered two shafts, which gave the boats a top surface speed of 14.9 knots (27.6 km/h; 17.1 mph), and 9.5 knots (17.6 km/h; 10.9 mph) when submerged. Electrical engines were usually left open without protection against drip or bilge water to save weight, but Type 17 U-boats were the first U-boats to have fully encased electrical engines. Cruising range was 6,700 nautical miles (12,400 km; 7,700 mi) at 8 knots (15 km/h; 9.2 mph) on the surface and 75 nautical miles (139 km; 86 mi) at 5 knots (9.3 km/h; 5.8 mph) submerged. Constructional diving depth (Note: Constructional diving depth had a safety factor of 2.5, which meant that crushing depth was 2.5 times construction diving depth.) was 50 m (164 ft 1 in).

The U-boats were armed with four 45 cm (18 in) torpedo tubes, two fitted in the bow and two in the stern, and carried six torpedoes. The boats' complement was 4 officers and 25 enlisted.

== Ships ==
| Name | launched | commissioned | merchant ships sunk (nbr / GRT ) | Fate |
|---|---|---|---|---|
| U-17 | 16 April 1912 | 3 November 1912 | 12 / 16.635 | Scrapped in 1919-20. |
| U-18 | 25 April 1912 | 17 November 1912 | none | Sunk on 23 November near the Orkney islands. |

== Bibliography ==
- Gröner, Erich; Jung, Dieter; Maass, Martin (1991). German Warships 1815–1945, U-boats and Mine Warfare Vessels. Vol. 2. Translated by Thomas, Keith; Magowan, Rachel. London: Conway Maritime Press. ISBN 0-85177-593-4.
- Herzog, Bodo (1993). Deutsche U-Boote : 1906 - 1966 [German U-boats : 1906 - 1966] (in German). Erlangen: Müller. ISBN 9783860700365.
- Möller, Eberhard; Brack, Werner (2004). The Encyclopedia of U-Boats. London: Chatham. ISBN 1-85367-623-3.
- Rössler, Eberhard (1981). The U-boat: The evolution and technical history of German submarines. London: Cassell & Co. ISBN 0-304-36120-8.
