= German submarine U-1 =

U-1 may refer to one of the following German submarines:

- SM U-1 (Germany) (1906), Germany's first U-boat, now preserved in the Deutsches Museum in Munich; served in the First World War as a German training submarine for the Kaiserliche Marine; now a museum ship
  - During the First World War, Germany also had these submarines with similar names:
    - SM UB-1, a Type UB I submarine launched in 1915; transferred to Austria-Hungary on 12 July 1915 and renamed U-10; sunk on 9 July 1918
    - SM UC-1, a Type UC I submarine launched in 1915 and sunk in July 1917
- German submarine U-1 (1935), a Type IIA submarine that served in the Second World War and was sunk in April 1940
- German submarine U-1 (1961), a Type 201 submarine of the Bundesmarine, launched in 1961 and scrapped in 1967
- German submarine U-1 (1967), a Type 205 submarine of the Bundesmarine that was launched in 1967 and sold in 1991

U-1 or U-I may also refer to:

- SM U-1 (Austria-Hungary), lead boat of the U-1 class for the Austro-Hungarian Navy
