= UI =

UI, Ui, or ui may refer to:

== Arts and entertainment ==
- Ui (band), an American post-rock band
- UI (film), an Indian Kannada-language film released in 2024
- Upin & Ipin, in which the abbrebiation 'UI' shows in the episode Selamatkan Neo Santara
- Ui Hirasawa, a character from the manga series K-On!
- Ui Miyazaki (born 1981), Japanese voice actress
- Shigure Ui, Japanese illustrator
- Arturo Ui, a fictional character from The Resistible Rise of Arturo Ui by Bertolt Brecht
- Youichi Ui (born 1972), Japanese motorcycle road racer
- Manami Ui (born 1986), Japanese model

== Businesses and organizations ==
=== Universities ===
- University of Ibadan, Nigeria
- University of Iceland
- University of Idaho, US
- University of Illinois, US
- University of Iloilo, Philippines
- University of Indonesia
- University of Innsbruck, Austria
- University of Iowa, US
- Universities Ireland, Northern Ireland
- University of Isfahan, Iran

=== Other businesses and organizations ===
- The United Illuminating Company, a regional electric distribution company in the northeastern US
- Eurocypria Airlines (IATA airline designator UI)
- Ubiquiti, an American technology company
- Unix International, an open-standard association

== Science, technology, and mathematics ==
=== Computing ===
- Unit interval (data transmission), also pulse time or signal duration time
- User interface, between human and machine

=== Other uses in science, technology, and mathematics ===
- Unité internationale, French for International unit, typically used for medication dose
- Unit injector for diesel engines
- Urinary incontinence

== Other uses ==
- Ui (digraph), used in some writing systems
- Unauthorised information; see Glossary of contract bridge terms#unauth
- Unemployment insurance
- United Ireland, a proposed state
- Universitas Indonesia railway station at the University of Indonesia

== See also ==
- U1 (disambiguation)
- μ_{i}, the initial magnetic permeability of a material
