= SM U-142 =

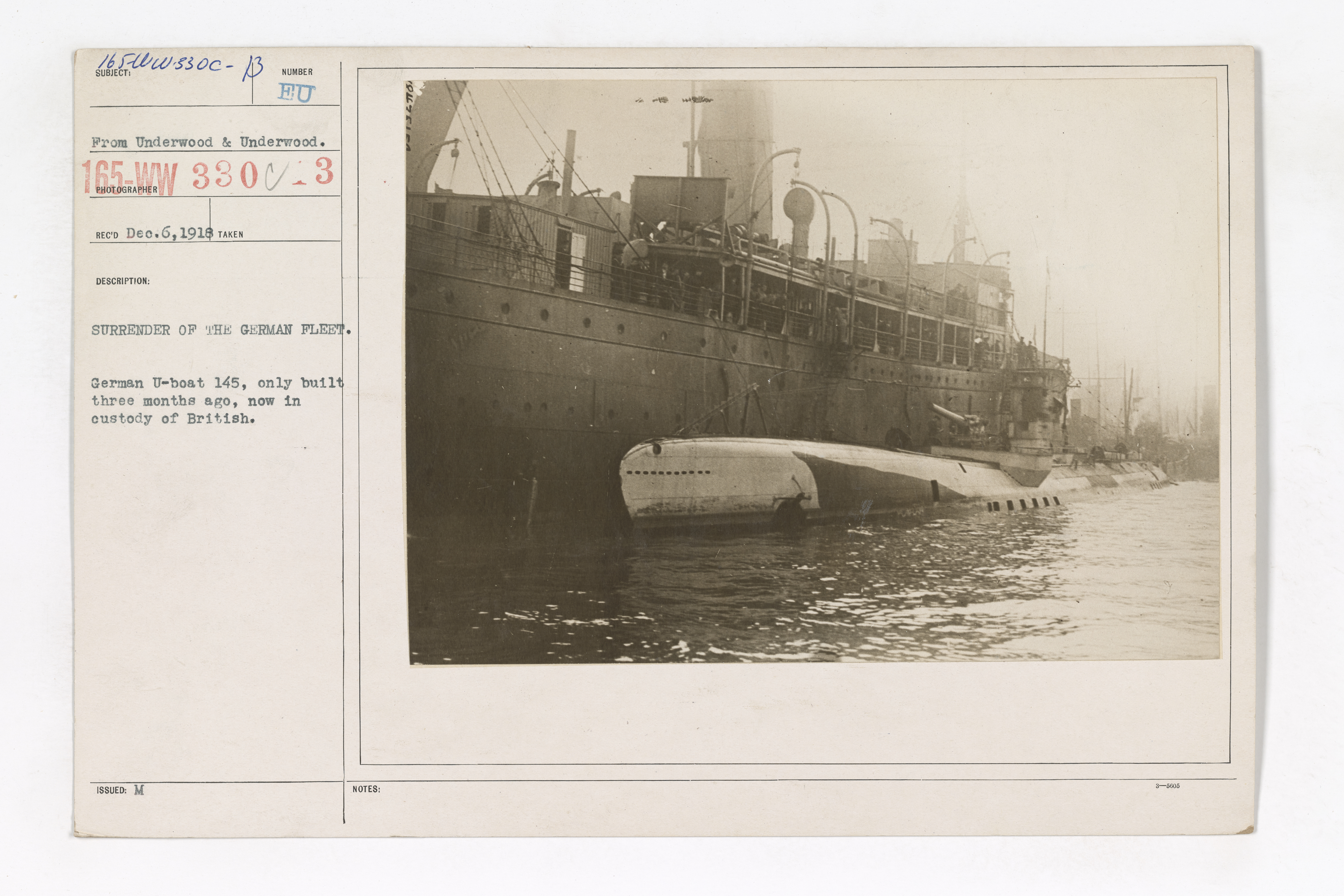
- Sister ship U-145 after surrender

History

German Empire
- Name: U-142
- Ordered: 29 November 1916
- Builder: Germaniawerft, Kiel
- Yard number: 303
- Launched: 4 March 1918
- Commissioned: 10 November 1918
- Fate: 10 November 1918 – Taken right back to the dockyard after being commissioned and demilitarized and finally broken up at Oslebshausen in 1919. Engine plants were surrendered to the allies.

General characteristics
- Class & type: German Type U 139 submarine
- Displacement: 2,158 t (2,124 long tons) surfaced; 2,785 t (2,741 long tons) submerged
- Length: 97.50 m (319 ft 11 in) (o/a); 77 m (252 ft 7 in) (pressure hull)
- Beam: 9.06 m (29 ft 9 in) (o/a); 5.70 m (18 ft 8 in) (pressure hull)
- Height: 5.38 m (17 ft 8 in)
- Draught: 11.20 m (36 ft 9 in)
- Installed power: 2 × 3,000 PS (2,206 kW; 2,959 shp); 1 × 450 PS (331 kW; 444 shp) surfaced; 2 × 1,300 PS (956 kW; 1,282 shp) submerged
- Propulsion: 2 shafts, 2 × 2.10 m (6 ft 11 in) propellers
- Speed: 17.5 knots (32.4 km/h; 20.1 mph) surfaced; 8.5 knots (15.7 km/h; 9.8 mph) submerged
- Range: 20,000 nmi (37,000 km; 23,000 mi) at 6 knots (11 km/h; 6.9 mph) surfaced; 70 nmi (130 km; 81 mi) at 4.5 knots (8.3 km/h; 5.2 mph) submerged
- Test depth: 75 m (246 ft 1 in)
- Complement: 6 (1) officers, 56 (20) enlisted – (prize crew)
- Armament: 6 × 50 cm (19.7 in) torpedo tubes (four bow, two stern); 19-24 torpedoes; 2 × 15 cm (5.9 in) SK L/45 deck guns; 2 × 8.8 cm (3.5 in) SK L/30 deck guns

Service record
- Commanders: KrvKpt. Erich Eckelmann; 10 – 11 November 1918
- Operations: none
- Victories: none

SM U-142 (Note: "SM" stands for "Seiner Majestät" (English: His Majesty's) and combined with the U for Unterseeboot would be translated as His Majesty's Submarine.) was one of the 329 submarines serving in the Imperial German Navy in World War I. U-142 was not engaged in the naval warfare.

It notably served as a template for the Imperial Japanese Navy's "Junsen type submarines".

== Bibliography ==
- Gröner, Erich; Jung, Dieter; Maass, Martin (1991). U-boats and Mine Warfare Vessels. German Warships 1815–1945. Vol. 2. Translated by Thomas, Keith; Magowan, Rachel. London: Conway Maritime Press. ISBN 0-85177-593-4.
