= E and F-class destroyer =

Ship class

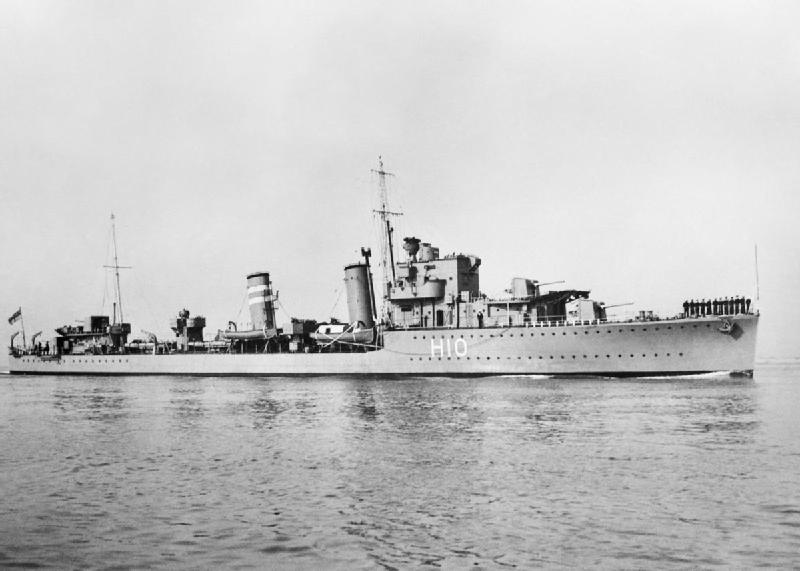
- Encounter moving slowly, July 1938

Class overview
- Operators: Royal Navy; Royal Canadian Navy; Royal Hellenic Navy; Dominican Navy
- Preceded by: C and D class
- Succeeded by: G and H class
- Subclasses: E, F
- Built: 1933–1935
- In commission: 1934–1968
- Completed: 18
- Lost: 10
- Scrapped: 8

General characteristics
- Type: Destroyer
- Displacement: 1,405 long tons (1,428 t) (standard); 1,940 long tons (1,970 t) (deep load)
- Length: 329 ft (100.3 m) (o/a)
- Beam: 33 ft 3 in (10.13 m)
- Draught: 12 ft 6 in (3.81 m) (deep)
- Installed power: 3 × Admiralty 3-drum boilers; 36,000 shp (27,000 kW)
- Propulsion: 2 × shafts; 2 × geared steam turbines
- Speed: 35.5 knots (65.7 km/h; 40.9 mph)
- Range: 6,350 nmi (11,760 km; 7,310 mi) at 15 knots (28 km/h; 17 mph)
- Complement: 145
- Sensors & processing systems: ASDIC
- Armament: 4 × single 4.7 in (120 mm) guns; 2 × quadruple 0.5 in (12.7 mm) machine guns; 2 × quadruple 21 in (533 mm) torpedo tubes; 1 × depth charge rack, 2 × throwers and 20 × depth charges

General characteristics (flotilla leaders, where different)
- Displacement: 1,475–1,495 long tons (1,499–1,519 t) (standard); 2,010–2,050 long tons (2,040–2,080 t) (deep load)
- Length: 343 ft (104.5 m) (o/a)
- Beam: 33 ft 9 in (10.29 m)
- Installed power: 38,000 shp (28,000 kW)
- Speed: 36 kn (67 km/h; 41 mph)
- Complement: 175
- Armament: 5 × single 4.7 in guns

The E- and F-class destroyers were a group of 18 destroyers built for the Royal Navy during the 1930s. The ships were initially assigned to the Home Fleet, although they reinforced the Mediterranean Fleet during the Italian invasion of Abyssinia of 1935–36 and enforced the Non-Intervention Agreement during the Spanish Civil War of 1936–1939. After the beginning of the Second World War in August 1939, the E-class ships were mostly assigned to escort duties under the Western Approaches Command, while the Fs were assigned to escort the ships of the Home Fleet. Between them they sank four German submarines through March 1940 while losing only one ship to a submarine.

Most of the sisters were committed to the Norwegian Campaign in April–June where they helped to sink one German destroyer and a submarine. The two E-class minelayer-destroyers helped to evacuate Allied troops from Dunkirk in May–June. Most of the Fs were sent to Gibraltar around the end of June and formed part of Force H where they participated in the attack on Mers-el-Kébir. Two months later they participated in the Battle of Dakar where they sank three Vichy French submarines. During the rest of 1940, they sank one Italian submarine while losing two ships to mines and torpedoes. Force H covered a number of convoys to Malta in 1941, during which they sank one German submarine and lost one destroyer to bombs. Three E-class ships began escorting convoys to Russia in late 1941 and three others were transferred to the Eastern Fleet.

Two of these latter were sunk by Japanese forces in early 1942 and two Fs were transferred to replace them. Many of the Fs reinforced the Arctic convoy escorts during which they fought several engagements with German destroyers and sank one German submarine. Several were detached to escort Malta convoys, during which one ship was lost. Several ships were converted to escort destroyers in late 1942–early 1943 for duty in the North Atlantic and many others were assigned there for extended periods of time where they sank two German submarines. Three of these ships were later transferred to the Royal Canadian Navy. Four of the Es and Fs were sent to the Mediterranean Fleet in mid-1943 to support the invasion of Sicily and remained there into 1944. One of these was transferred to the Royal Hellenic Navy that same year and remained in Greek service until 1956. The ships that remained in the Atlantic sank two German submarines in 1944 before they were recalled to the UK in May to prepare for the invasion of Normandy. There they sank two submarines, although another F-class ship was lost to a mine. The ships mostly returned to the North Atlantic after Overlord or began long refits in Canada.

The three Canadian ships were used to transport troops back to Canada after the end of the war before being broken up in 1947. Most of the British ships were broken up around the same time, although one ship was sold to the Dominican Navy in 1949 and served until 1968.

== Design and description ==
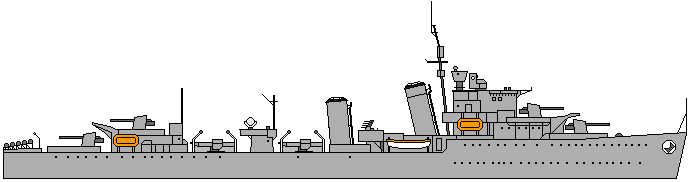
Profile of an E-class destroyer

The E class were ordered as part of the 1931 Naval Construction Programme, the F class following in 1932. These ships were based on the preceding D class with minor changes to the hull and armament. Two of the ships were modified to accommodate 60 mines. The F class were repeats of the E's with some minor differences. All of the destroyers were fitted with ASDIC (sonar) and the ability to use the Two-Speed Destroyer Sweep (TSDS) minesweeping gear.

The E- and F-class destroyers displaced 1,405 long tons (1,428 t) at standard load and 1,940 long tons (1,970 t) at deep load. They had an overall length of 329 feet (100.3 m), a beam of 33 feet 3 inches (10.1 m) and a draught of 12 feet 6 inches (3.8 m). The ships' complement was 145 officers and ratings. They were powered by two Parsons geared steam turbines, each driving one propeller shaft, using steam provided by three Admiralty 3-drum boilers that operated at a pressure of 300 psi (2,068 kPa; 21 kgf/cm^{2}) and a temperature of 620 °F (327 °C). The turbines developed a total of 36,000 shaft horsepower (27,000 kW) and gave a maximum speed of 35.5 knots (65.7 km/h; 40.9 mph). The destroyers carried a maximum of 470–480 long tons (480–490 t) of fuel oil that gave them a range of 6,350 nautical miles (11,760 km; 7,310 mi) at 15 knots (28 km/h; 17 mph).

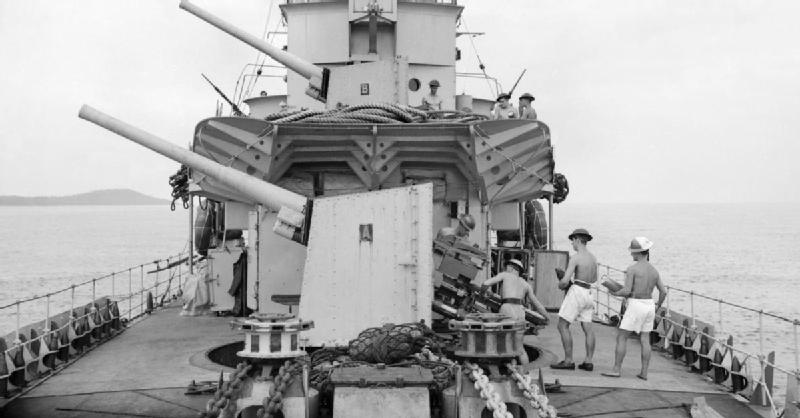
Foxhound's forward guns, August 1943

All of the ships had the same main armament, four quick-firing (QF) 4.7-inch (120 mm) Mark IX guns in single mounts, designated 'A', 'B', 'X', and 'Y' from front to rear. The guns had a maximum elevation of 40° which was achieved by using a lowered section of the deck around the mount, the "well", that allowed the breech of the gun to be lowered below deck height. They fired a 50-pound (22.7 kg) shell at a muzzle velocity of 2,650 ft/s (810 m/s) to a range of 16,970 yards (15,520 m). For anti-aircraft (AA) defence, they had two quadruple mounts for the QF 0.5-inch Vickers Mk III machine gun on platforms between the funnels. The E- and F-class ships were fitted with two quadruple mounts for 21-inch (533 mm) torpedo tubes. The ships, except for the minelayers, were also equipped with two throwers and one rack for 20 depth charges. The stern of the minelayers was fitted with a pair of sponsons that housed part of the mechanical chain-conveyor system and to ensure smooth delivery of her mines. To compensate for the weight of her Mark XIV mines, their rails, two 4.7-inch guns, their ammunition, both sets of torpedo tubes, their whalers and their davits had to be removed.

The main guns were controlled by an Admiralty Fire Control Clock Mk I that used data derived from the manually operated director-control tower and the separate 9-foot (2.7 m) rangefinder situated above the bridge. They had no capability for anti-aircraft fire and the anti-aircraft guns were aimed solely by eye.

=== Wartime modifications ===
Beginning in May 1940, the after bank of torpedo tubes was removed and replaced with a QF 12-pounder 20-cwt anti-aircraft gun, (Note: "Cwt" is the abbreviation for hundredweight, 20 cwt referring to the weight of the gun.) the after mast and funnel being cut down to improve the gun's field of fire. Four to eight QF 20 mm Oerlikon cannons were added to the surviving ships, usually replacing the .50-calibre machine gun mounts between the funnels. One pair of these was added to the bridge wings and the other pair was mounted abreast the searchlight platform. Early in the war, depth charge stowage increased to 38. By 1943, all the surviving ships, except Fury had the 'Y' gun on the quarterdeck removed to allow for additional depth charge stowage and two additional depth charge throwers. The 12-pounder was removed to allow for the installation of a Huff-Duff radio direction finder on a short mainmast and for more depth charges. All of the survivors, except perhaps for Echo, had 'A' or 'B' gun replaced by a Hedgehog anti-submarine spigot mortar, and their director-control tower and rangefinder above the bridge removed in exchange for a Type 271 target-indication radar, Fame had her 'A' gun reinstalled by 1944. A Type 286 short-range, surface-search radar, adapted from the Royal Air Force's ASV radar, was also added. The early models, however, could only scan directly forward and had to be aimed by turning the entire ship. Express's modifications differed somewhat in that 'B' gun was replaced by a twin-gun QF 6-pounder Hotchkiss mount and a split Hedgehog installation. In addition, she retained her 12-pounder gun, but her remaining torpedo tubes were removed.

=== Flotilla leaders ===
For the first time since the A class of the 1927 programme, the flotilla leaders were built to an enlarged design, being lengthened to incorporate an additional QF 4.7-inch gun between the funnels. The lengthened design resulted in a three boiler room layout to enhance water-tight integrity. The leaders were not fitted for minesweeping or minelaying. They displaced 1,475–1,495 long tons (1,499–1,519 t) at standard load and 2,010–2,050 long tons (2,040–2,080 t) at deep load. The ships had an overall length of 343 feet (104.5 m), a beam of 33 feet 9 inches (10.3 m) and a draught of 12 feet 6 inches (3.8 m). The ships carried a total of 175 personnel which included the staff of the Captain (D), commanding officer of the flotilla. Their turbines were 2,000 shp (1,500 kW) more powerful than the private ships, which made them 0.5 knots (0.93 km/h; 0.58 mph) faster; their propulsion machinery was otherwise identical. Exmouth was an early wartime loss and consequently received no modifications, but Faulknor survived the war. Her modifications differed somewhat from those of the private ships. She received a 4-inch (102 mm) AA gun in lieu of her aft torpedo tubes, although they were later reinstalled and the 4-inch gun replaced 'X' 4.7-inch gun. Two Oerlikons were later added on the forward part of her aft superstructure and a quadruple QF two-pounder "pom-pom" mount replaced 'Q' gun between the funnels. Finally her rangefinder was replaced by a high-angle director fitted with a Type 285 gunnery radar.

== Ships ==
=== E class ===
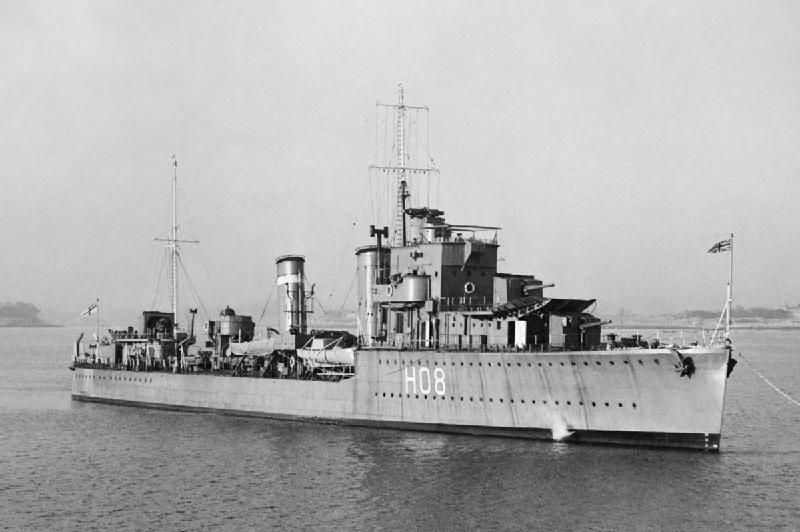
Eclipse at anchor before 1943

Construction data
Ship	Builder	Laid down	Launched	Completed	Fate
Exmouth (flotilla leader)	HM Dockyard, Portsmouth	15 May 1933	7 February 1934	9 November 1934	Sunk by the German submarine U-22, 21 January 1940
Echo	William Denny & Brothers, Dumbarton	20 March 1933	16 February 1934	22 October 1934	Transferred to Greece as Navarinon in 1944; returned to RN in 1956 and scrapped
Eclipse	William Denny & Brothers, Dumbarton	22 March 1933	12 April 1934	29 November 1934	Sunk by a mine, 24 October 1943
Electra	Hawthorn Leslie & Company, Hebburn	15 March 1933	15 February 1934	13 September 1934	Sunk in the Battle of the Java Sea, 27 February 1942
Encounter	Hawthorn Leslie & Company, Hebburn	15 March 1933	29 March 1934	2 November 1934	Sunk in the Second Battle of the Java Sea, 1 March 1942
Escapade	Scotts Shipbuilding & Engineering Company, Greenock	30 March 1933	30 January 1934	30 August 1934	Scrapped 1947
Escort	Scotts Shipbuilding & Engineering Company, Greenock	30 March 1933	29 March 1934	30 October 1934	Torpedoed by the Italian submarine Guglielmo Marconi, 8 July 1940; sank while under tow, 11 July
Esk	Swan Hunter & Wigham Richardson, Wallsend	24 March 1933	19 March 1934	28 September 1934	Sunk by mine, 31 August 1940
Express	Swan Hunter & Wigham Richardson, Wallsend	24 March 1933	29 May 1934	2 November 1934	Transferred to RCN as HMCS Gatineau

=== F class ===
Construction data
Ship	Builder	Laid down	Launched	Completed	Fate
Faulknor (flotilla leader)	Yarrow, Scotstoun	31 July 1933	12 June 1934	24 May 1935	Scrapped, 1946
Fame	Parsons, Wallsend	5 July 1933	28 June 1934	26 April 1935	Sold to Dominican Republic as Generalisimo 1949, scrapped 1968
Fearless	Cammell Laird, Birkenhead	17 March 1933	12 May 1934	22 December 1934	Torpedoed by Italian aircraft and scuttled, 23 July 1941
Firedrake	Parsons, Wallsend	5 July 1933	28 June 1934	30 May 1935	Sunk by the German submarine U-211, 16/17 December 1942
Foresight	Cammell Laird, Birkenhead	21 July 1933	29 June 1934	15 May 1935	Torpedoed by an Italian bomber and scuttled by HMS Tartar, 13 August 1942
Forester	J. Samuel White, Cowes	15 May 1933	28 June 1934	29 March 1935	Scrapped, 1946
Fortune	John Brown, Clydebank	25 July 1933	29 August 1934	27 April 1935	Transferred to RCN as HMCS Saskatchewan, 1943
Foxhound	John Brown, Clydebank	21 August 1933	12 October 1934	6 June 1935	Transferred to RCN as HMCS Qu'Appelle, 1944
Fury	J. Samuel White, Cowes	19 May 1933	10 September 1934	18 May 1935	Scrapped after mine and collision damage, 1944

== Service ==
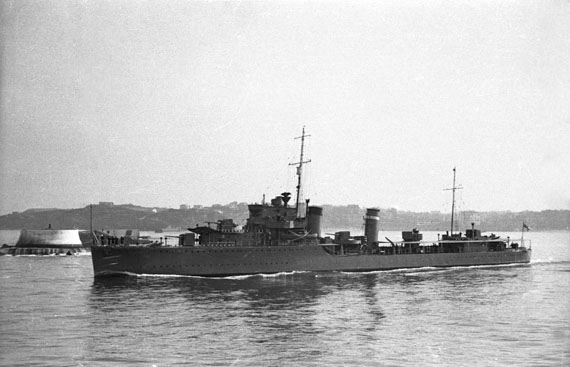
Exmouth leaving Bilbao, 22 October 1936

All of the E class were assigned to the 5th Destroyer Flotilla (DF) of the Home Fleet upon commissioning during 1934. Following the Italian invasion of Abyssinia, the entire flotilla was sent to the Red Sea in August 1935 to monitor Italian warship movements until April 1936. Refitted upon their return, many were deployed to Spanish waters during the Spanish Civil War in 1936–39 to intercept shipping carrying contraband goods to Spain and to protect British-flagged ships. While the F-class ships were assigned to the 6th Destroyer Flotilla of the Home Fleet, they followed much the same pattern as their E-class sisters. In April 1939 the 5th and 6th DFs were renumbered the 7th and 8th Destroyer Flotillas, respectively. In mid-1939, newly commissioned J-class destroyers began to replace the E-class ships and they were reduced to reserve for lack of manpower. Increasing tensions with Nazi Germany in August, caused the British to mobilize the Navy's reserves, which allowed the ships to be manned again and assigned to the 12th Destroyer Flotilla of the Home Fleet.

When the war began on 3 September, the E-class ships, except for the two minelayers, Esk and Express, were assigned to the Western Approaches Command (WAC) for convoy escort and patrolling duties, while the Fs remained with the Home Fleet, performing the same sorts of tasks. On 14 September, Faulknor, Firedrake, and Foxhound, escorting the aircraft carrier Ark Royal, sank U-39, the first German submarine to be lost during the war, after she had unsuccessfully attacked the carrier. Six days later, Fearless, Faulknor, Forester, and Fortune sank U-27. Most of the E class remained with the WAC until April 1940, but several were transferred to Rosyth Command at the end of 1939. Exmouth was one of these and was sunk by U-22 on 21 January 1940 in the Moray Firth. On the other hand, Escapade forced U-63 to the surface on 25 February, which was then scuttled by her crew, and Fortune sank U-44 on 20 March. Esk and Express were assigned to the specialist 20th Destroyer Flotilla shortly after the war began, together with the four I-class destroyer-minelayers, and were busy laying mines in the North Sea and off the English coast through April–May 1940.

The beginning of the Norwegian Campaign in April saw almost all of the E and F class transferred to the Home Fleet for operations in Norwegian waters. For the most part they escorted the ships of the Home Fleet and the various convoys to and from Norway, but Forester and Foxhound were part of the escort for the battleship Warspite during the Second Battle of Narvik on 13 April and the latter helped to sink one German destroyer. While escorting one convoy, Fearless and the destroyer Brazen sank U-49 two days later. Esk and Express were the only two ships committed to the evacuation of Dunkirk in May–June, each rescuing thousands of Allied troops.

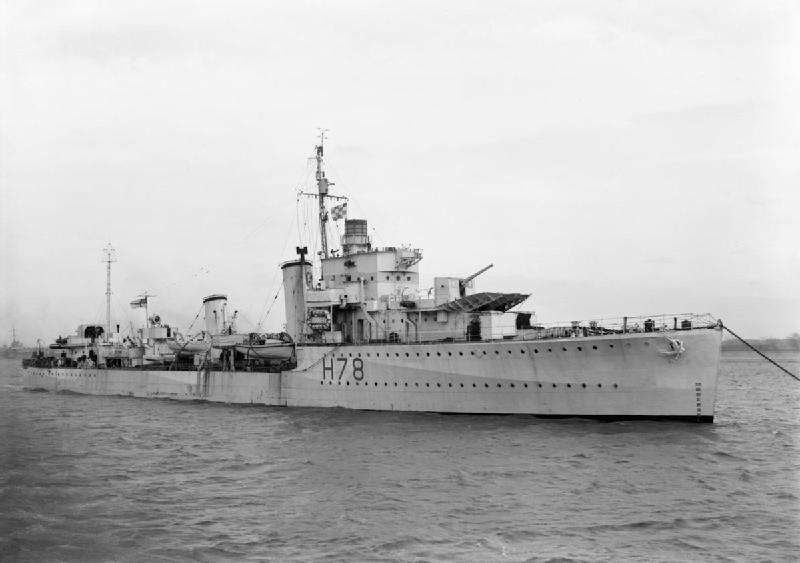
Fame at anchor, 5 September 1942

Fearless, Escapade, Faulknor, and Foxhound of the 8th DF escorted Ark Royal and the battlecruiser Hood to Gibraltar in late June, where they formed Force H. Eight days later, they participated in the attack on Mers-el-Kébir against the Vichy French ships stationed there, together with Forester, Foresight and Escort. The latter ship was sunk by an Italian submarine on 11 July while covering a Malta convoy. Most of Force H returned to the UK for a brief refit in early August, but upon their return at the end of the month, the 8th DF now consisted of Faulknor, Forester, Foresight, Firedrake, Fortune, Fury, and Greyhound. On the night of 31 August/1 September, Esk, Express and three other minelaying destroyers laid a minefield off the Dutch island of Texel. While doing so, the latter ship struck a mine that blew her bow off. While closing to render aid, Esk struck two mines that broke her in half with heavy casualties. Express was towed back to England for repairs that lasted until October 1941. On 13 September, Force H met a convoy that was carrying troops intended to capture Dakar from the Vichy French that was escorted by Inglefield, Eclipse, Echo, Encounter, and Escapade. Ten days later they attacked Dakar where Foresight and Inglefield sank the French submarine Persée, Fortune sank the submarine Ajax a day later and Foresight sank the submarine Bévéziers on the 25th. After the battle, Escapade and Echo returned to the Home Fleet and resumed their regular duties of fleet escort. On 17 October, Fame ran aground and could not be refloated for several months. The following day, Firedrake together with the destroyer Wrestler and two Royal Air Force flying boats sank the Italian submarine Durbo. Fury, Encounter, Faulknor, Firedrake, and Forester participated in the inconclusive Battle of Cape Spartivento on 27 November.

In 1941, the 8th DF escorted Force H as it covered multiple convoys and aircraft carriers flying off aircraft to Malta. While returning from one of the latter missions, Forester, Foresight, Faulknor, Fearless and Foxhound sank U-138 on 18 June. A month later, Fearless was crippled by Italian bombs on 23 July while escorting a convoy to Malta and had to be scuttled by her sister Foresight while Firedrake was badly damaged by near misses and had to return to Gibraltar for repairs. The ships of the 8th DF mostly returned home between August and October for repairs and refits. Encounter was transferred to the Mediterranean Fleet in April and spent several months under repair as she was badly damaged by bombs at Malta. The ship was then transferred to the Eastern Fleet in November and arrived at Singapore the following month. Eclipse, Echo, and Electra were assigned to the 3rd Destroyer Flotilla of the Home Fleet at the beginning of 1941 where they escorted the larger ships of the fleet while they were searching for German commerce raiders and on other missions. Escapade began escorting convoys to Russia in August and continued to do so for most of the following year. Electra did the same for several months until she was detailed to escort the battleship Prince of Wales and the battlecruiser Repulse to Singapore in October, together with Express.

Express and Electra were half of the escorts for Prince of Wales and Repulse as they sailed north on 9 December, but could do little as the Japanese bombers sank the two capital ships other than help to rescue the 3,000-odd survivors. Upon their return to Singapore, they joined Encounter and the other destroyers there escorting ships between Singapore and the Sunda Strait. Electra and Encounter escorted the heavy cruiser Exeter during the Battle of the Java Sea on 27 February 1942. The former ship was sunk by a Japanese destroyer as she covered Exeter's withdrawal. Several days later, Encounter and the American destroyer Pope were escorting the damaged Exeter en route to Ceylon when they encountered four Japanese heavy cruisers and their escorts. Encounter and Exeter were sunk in the subsequent battle on 1 March. Express did not participate in any of these battles because she'd been damaged by a boiler room fire in early February and her repairs did not begin until April. Fortune joined her sister with the Eastern Fleet in February, with Foxhound following two months later.

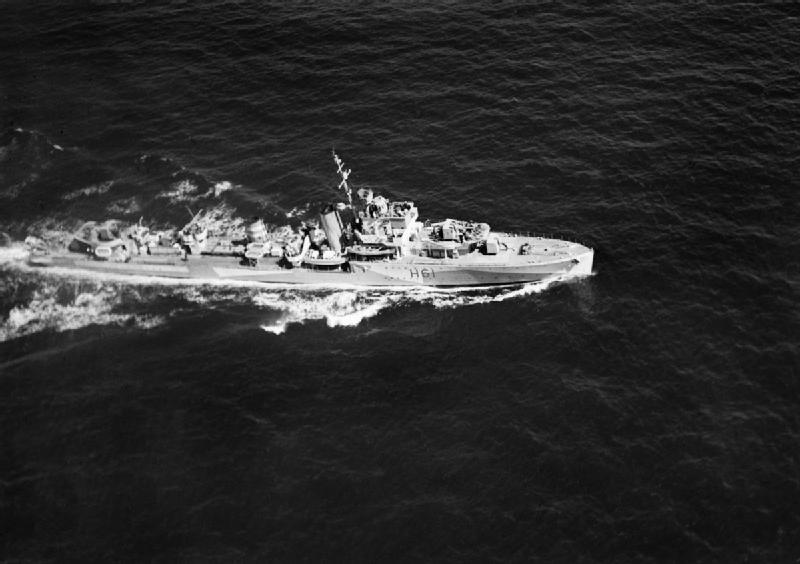
Aerial view of Express in November 1942

On 27 March, Fury, Eclipse and the light cruiser Trinidad were escorting Convoy PQ 13 in the Arctic when they were intercepted by three German destroyers. In the ensuing action, the cruiser was damaged by one of her own torpedoes and Eclipse was hit twice, although the cruiser sank the German destroyer Z26. Foresight, Forester and the light cruiser Edinburgh were the close escort for Convoy QP 11, returning from Murmansk to Iceland, when Edinburgh was torpedoed on 29 April. The two hits disabled her steering and she had to be towed by the two destroyers. Two days later, they were attacked by three German destroyers which badly damaged Foresight and Forester and put another torpedo into Edinburgh, crippling her. The two destroyers took off the survivors and scuttled the cruiser. Temporarily repaired at Murmansk, the sisters were part of Trinidad's escort home when she was set on fire by a German bomber and had to be scuttled on 15 May. Faulknor, Fury, Escapade, Echo, and Eclipse escorted more Arctic convoys in May–September, Faulknor sinking U-88 on 12 September while escorting Convoy PQ 18. Foresight and Fury were briefly detached to escort the fleet during Operation Pedestal in August, during which the former was torpedoed and had to be scuttled. While being repaired, Fame was converted into an escort destroyer and was assigned to the WAC, joining her sister, Fearless, upon its completion in September. A month later, she sank U-353 while protecting Convoy SC 104. Fearless was torpedoed and sunk by U-211 on 16 December.

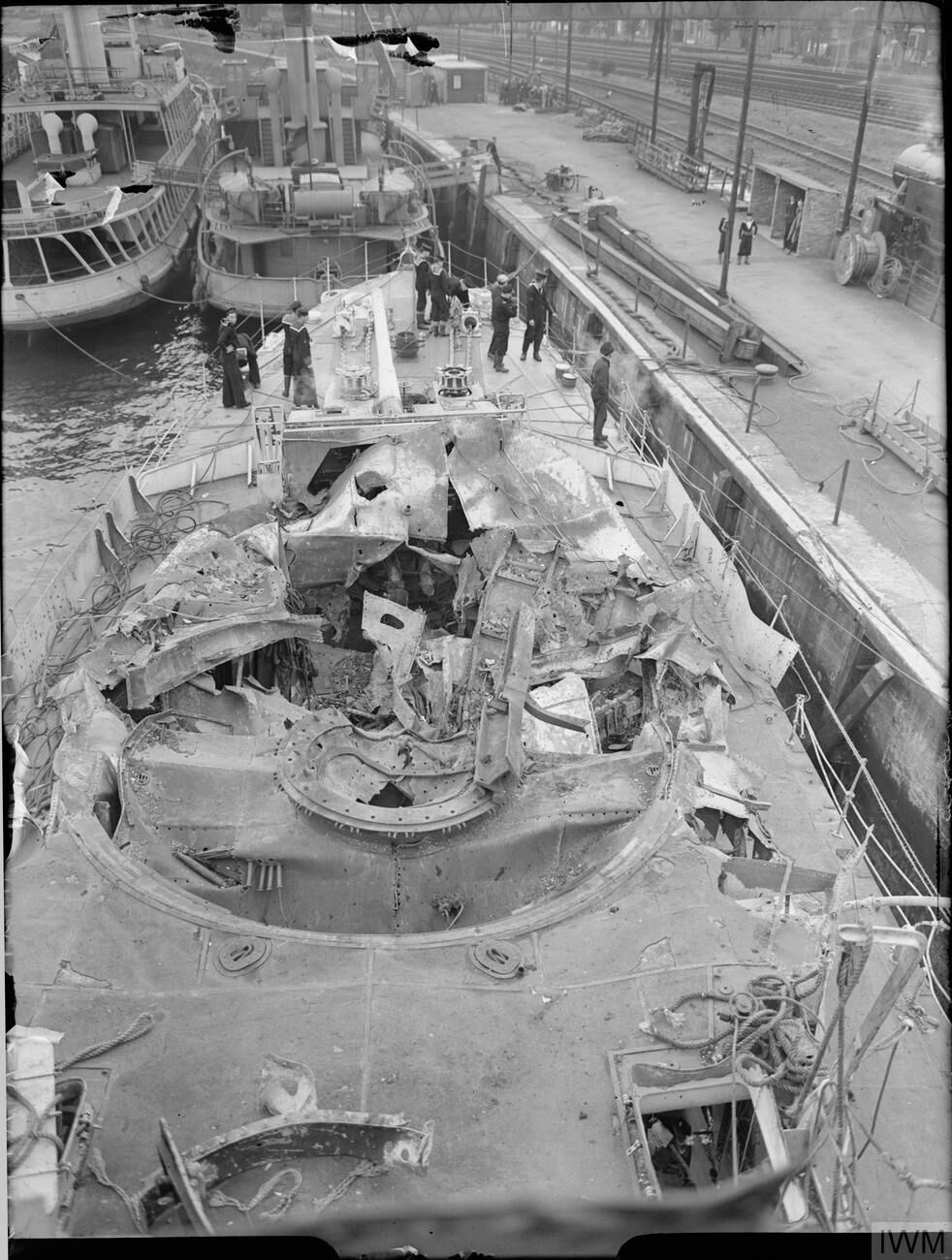
The damage suffered by Escapade after her Hedgehog prematurely detonated on 20 September 1943

When convoys to Russia resumed in December 1942, Fury, Forester, Faulknor, Eclipse, and Echo were assigned as escorts. Fury, and Eclipse were detached to augment the escorts of the WAC in March–May 1943, joining their sisters, Fame and Escapade, when German submarine attacks reached their peak. The former had already sunk U-69 on 17 February while escorting Convoy ONS 165. Express, Fortune and Foxhound was assigned to the Eastern Fleet at the beginning of 1943, but the first two returned to Britain in February to begin refits, during which they were transferred to the Royal Canadian Navy and renamed Gatineau and Saskatchewan in June and May, respectively. Foxhound followed in August and was converted into an escort destroyer before being given to the Canadians in February 1944 and renamed Qu'Appelle. Forester was assigned to Escort Group C1 of the WAC in June. Escapade was badly damaged by a premature detonation of her Hedgehog projectiles in September and was under repair until the end of 1944. Faulknor, Fury, Echo, and Eclipse were transferred to the Mediterranean Fleet to escort the covering force during the invasion of Sicily in July and the subsequent landings in mainland Italy. Faulknor, Fury, and Eclipse participated in the Dodecanese Campaign after the surrender of Italy in September and the latter ship sank after hitting a mine on 24 October.

Echo began a long refit at Malta in December and was loaned to the Royal Hellenic Navy upon its completion in April 1944. Renamed Navarinon, she supported government forces during the Greek Civil War and was retained after the end of the war. Faulknor and Fury later supported operations in Italy before returning to the UK for Operation Overlord in June. While escorting Convoy HX 280, Gatineau helped to sink U-744 on 6 March, four days later Forester participated in the sinking of U-845. Fame, Forester, Gatineau, Saskatchewan, and Qu'Appelle joined their sisters covering the preparations for the invasion of Normandy and the invasion itself. Fame and two others destroyers sank U-767 on 18 June. Fury struck a mine on 21 June and was forced to beach herself to prevent her from sinking. She was written off after she was salvaged and was broken up for scrap beginning in September. Saskatchewan and Gatineau returned to Canada in August for lengthy refits that lasted into 1945 after which they returned to the UK. Qu'Appelle returned to the North Atlantic in October and Forester helped to sink U-413 on 20 August and then was sent back to the North Atlantic. Escapade was fitted with the new Squid anti-submarine mortar when her repairs were finished.

=== Postwar ===
Gatineau, Saskatchewan, and Qu'Appelle were used to ferry Canadian troops back home before they were placed in reserve in 1946 and subsequently sold for scrap, although Gatineau was scuttled in 1948 in British Columbia to serve as a breakwater. Faulknor and Forester were reduced to reserve in 1945 and broken up the following year; Escapade lasted on active duty a year longer as she served in the Anti-Submarine Training Flotilla until 1946, but the ship was scrapped the next year. Unlike most of her sisters, Fame remained on active duty until 1947 when she was placed in reserve. She was sold to the Dominican Republic in 1949 and renamed Generalissimo. The ship was renamed Sanchez in 1962 and finally discarded in 1968. Navarinon later became a training ship before she was returned to the Royal Navy in 1956 and broken up the following year.
