= HMS Fury (H76) =

British F-class destroyer

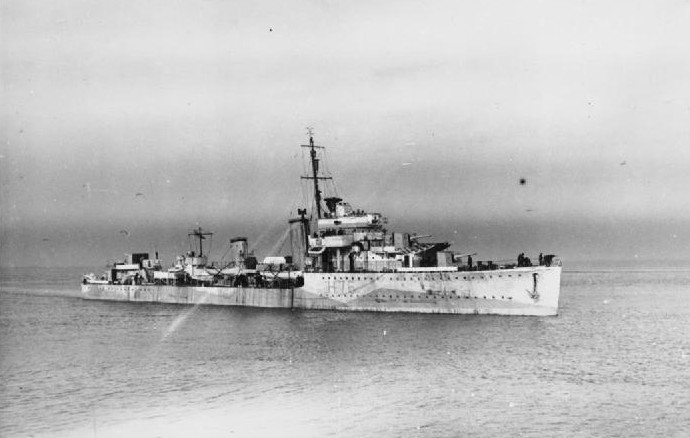
- Fury underway, 1942

History

United Kingdom
- Name: Fury
- Ordered: 17 March 1933
- Builder: J. Samuel White, Cowes, Isle of Wight
- Cost: £248,538
- Laid down: 19 May 1933
- Launched: 10 September 1934
- Commissioned: 18 May 1935
- Fate: Damaged by mine and wrecked, 21 June 1944; Scrapped beginning 18 September 1944

General characteristics (as built)
- Class & type: F-class destroyer
- Displacement: 1,405 long tons (1,428 t) (standard)
- Length: 329 ft (100.3 m) o/a
- Beam: 33 ft 3 in (10.13 m)
- Draught: 12 ft 6 in (3.81 m) (deep)
- Installed power: 3 × Admiralty 3-drum boilers; 36,000 shaft horsepower (27,000 kW)
- Propulsion: 2 × shafts; 2 × geared steam turbines
- Speed: 35.5 knots (65.7 km/h; 40.9 mph)
- Range: 6,350 nmi (11,760 km; 7,310 mi) at 15 knots (28 km/h; 17 mph)
- Complement: 145
- Sensors & processing systems: ASDIC
- Armament: 4 × single 4.7 in (120 mm) guns; 2 × quadruple 0.5 in (12.7 mm) machine guns; 2 × quadruple 21 in (533 mm) torpedo tubes; 20 × depth charges, 1 rack and 2 throwers

HMS Fury was an F-class destroyer built for the Royal Navy in the 1930s. Although assigned to the Home Fleet upon completion, the ship was attached to the Mediterranean Fleet in 1935–1936 during the Abyssinia Crisis. During the Spanish Civil War of 1936–1939, she spent time in Spanish waters, enforcing the arms blockade imposed by Britain and France on both sides of the conflict. The ship escorted the larger ships of the fleet during the early stages of the Second World War and played a minor role in the Norwegian Campaign of 1940. Fury was sent to Gibraltar in mid-1940 and formed part of Force H where she participated in the attack on Mers-el-Kébir and the Battle of Dakar. The ship escorted numerous Malta convoys in 1940–1941 and Arctic convoys during 1942.

Fury was briefly transferred to the Mediterranean in August 1942 to participate in Operation Pedestal but returned to the Home Fleet immediately afterwards to resume her role screening convoys to Russia. She continued in this role until March 1943 when she began escorting Atlantic convoys for several months. The ship was transferred to the Mediterranean Fleet a few months later as the Allies began Italian campaign in mid-1943. Later in the year, she participated in the Dodecanese Campaign in the Aegean where she helped to sink a German troop convoy. Fury returned to the Home Fleet in mid-1944 in preparation for Operation Neptune, the Allied invasion of France. The ship provided naval gunfire support during the landings until she struck a mine during a storm on 21 June and was then blown ashore. She was deemed uneconomical to repair and scrapping began in September.

== Description ==
The F-class ships were repeats of the preceding E class. They displaced 1,405 long tons (1,428 t) at standard load and 1,940 long tons (1,970 t) at deep load. The ships had an overall length of 329 feet (100.3 m), a beam of 33 feet 3 inches (10.1 m) and a draught of 12 feet 6 inches (3.8 m). They were powered by two Parsons geared steam turbines, each driving one propeller shaft, using steam provided by three Admiralty three-drum boilers. The turbines developed a total of 36,000 shaft horsepower (27,000 kW) and gave a maximum speed of 35.5 knots (65.7 km/h; 40.9 mph). Fury carried a maximum of 470 long tons (480 t) of fuel oil that gave her a range of 6,350 nautical miles (11,760 km; 7,310 mi) at 15 knots (28 km/h; 17 mph). The ships' complement was 145 officers and ratings.

The ships mounted four 4.7-inch (120 mm) Mark IX guns in single mounts, 'A', 'B', 'X', and 'Y' in sequence from front to rear. For anti-aircraft (AA) defence, they had two quadruple Mark I mounts for the 0.5 inch Vickers Mark III machine guns. The F class was fitted with two above-water quadruple torpedo tube mounts for 21-inch (533 mm) torpedoes. One depth charge rack and two throwers were fitted; 20 depth charges were originally carried but this increased to 35 shortly after the war began.

=== Wartime modifications ===
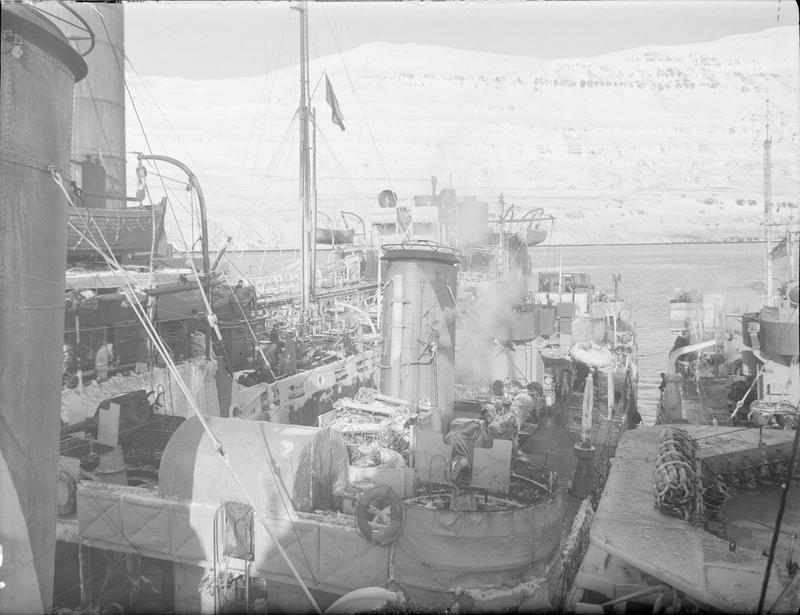
Fury refuelling from an oiler in Iceland, February–March 1943

Between October 1940 and April 1941, Fury had her rear torpedo tube mount replaced by a 12-pounder (76 mm) anti-aircraft gun. During her early 1942 refit, two 20 mm (0.8 in) Oerlikon light AA guns were installed abreast the bridge. By July 1942, a Type 286 short-range surface-search radar was fitted as was a HF/DF radio direction finder mounted on a pole mainmast. By February 1943 photographic evidence shows that a pair of Oerlikons had replaced her Vickers .50 machine guns. During her early 1944 refit, another pair of Oerlikons was added and her 12-pounder gun was removed. Photos taken of the ship in July 1944 show her with a Type 271 radar mounted on her searchlight platform that was probably installed during her last refit.

== Construction and career ==
Fury was built by J. Samuel White at its Cowes shipyard under the 1932 Naval Programme. The ship was laid down on 19 May 1933, launched on 10 September 1934, as the eleventh ship to carry the name and completed on 18 April 1935. The ship cost £248,538 (pounds) excluding Admiralty-supplied equipment such as armaments and communications equipment. Fury was initially assigned to the 6th Destroyer Flotilla (DF) of the Home Fleet, but was sent to reinforce the Mediterranean Fleet, together with most of her sister ships, during the Abyssinian crisis in June. On 11 December 1936, the day after his abdication broadcast, Fury embarked The Duke of Windsor for passage to Boulogne-sur-Mer. After returning home, she remained there aside from deployments to Spanish waters to enforce the arms embargo imposed on both sides in the Spanish Civil War by the Non-Intervention Committee. The flotilla was renumbered the 8th Destroyer Flotilla in April 1939, five months before the start of the Second World War. Fury remained assigned to it until June 1940, escorting the larger ships of the fleet and conducting anti-submarine patrols.

On 15 September, Fury was one of the destroyers that relieved her sisters escorting the aircraft carrier Ark Royal after they had sunk German submarine U-39 after it attacked the carrier. Two months later, she was escorting the battleship Nelson when the latter struck a magnetic mine as they were entering Loch Ewe on 4 December. Fury remained there for a time in case any further mining attempts were made. In February 1940, she was one of the escorts for Convoy TC 3 carrying troops from Canada to Britain. On 17 April, Fury screened the damaged heavy cruiser Suffolk as she returned to Scapa Flow after bombarding the airbase at Stavanger, Norway.

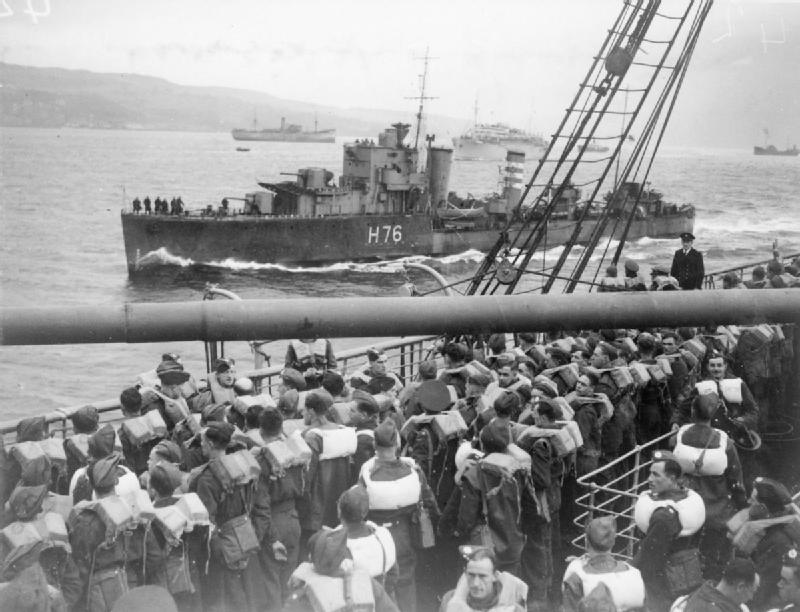
Fury passing troops at their stations during a boat drill on board Oronsay heading for the Norwegian campaign in 1940. She is lying off Gourock at the mouth of the River Clyde.

Beginning on 23 April, the ship was one of the escorts for the aircraft carriers Ark Royal and Glorious as they conducted air operations off the coast of Norway in support of Allied land operations. Glorious was detached to refuel at Scapa Flow on 27 April and was escorted by Fury and seven other destroyers. Three days later, she screened the battleship Valiant as the latter rendezvoused with Ark Royal. On 9 May, Fury, her sister Foresight and three other destroyers were detached from the escort of the battlecruiser Repulse to intercept a German force of E-boats that was expected. Other forces searching for German minelayers nearby also failed to locate their quarry. During this time, the destroyers Kelly and Kandahar were detached from the screen of the light cruiser Birmingham to pursue a possible submarine contact and Kelly was torpedoed by S-31 in the darkness later that night. The destroyer Bulldog came up to assist and towed Kelly most of the way to Hebburn, escorted by Fury, Kandahar and the destroyer Gallant. On 18 May, Fury and her sisters Foresight and Fortune were transferred to the Humber to counter the threat of E-boats and minelayers in the North Sea.

=== Force H, 1940–1941 ===
On 29 June, Fury sailed from Scapa to Gibraltar to join her sisters of the 8th Destroyer Flotilla as the escorts for Force H. On 3 July she took part in Operation Catapult the Attack on Mers-el-Kébir against the French Fleet. In late August the ship escorted Valiant and the new carrier Illustrious from Britain to Gibraltar. The next day, Fury and Force H covered the passage of Valiant and Illustrious through the Western Mediterranean to rendezvous with the Mediterranean Fleet (Operation Hats). On 13 September, Force H rendezvoused with a convoy that was carrying troops intended to capture Dakar from the Vichy French. Ten days later, they attacked Dakar, but were driven off by the Vichy French defences. During the battle on 24 September, Fury, the destroyer Greyhound, and the heavy cruiser HMAS Australia engaged the Vichy French destroyer L'Audacieux which was set on fire and forced to beach. In early October, Fury escorted a troop convoy from Freetown, Sierra Leone, to French Cameroon.

She returned to Gibraltar on 19 October, together with her sisters Faulknor and Forester. The ship escorted the carriers Argus and Ark Royal during Operation Coat and Operation White in November. Fury escorted Force F to Malta during Operation Collar later in the month and participated in the inconclusive Battle of Cape Spartivento on 27 November, where she was part of the screen for the battlecruiser Renown and the battleship Ramillies. In January 1941, the ship screened Force H during Operation Excess. At the end of the month, Force H departed Gibraltar to carry out Operation Picket, an unsuccessful night torpedo attack by eight of Ark Royal's Swordfish on the Tirso Dam in Sardinia. The British ships returned to Gibraltar on 4 February and began preparing for Operation Grog, a naval bombardment of Genoa, that was carried out five days later. The following month Fury underwent a brief refit at Malta. At the end of March, together with the light cruiser HMS Sheffield and three other destroyers, the ship attempted to intercept a Vichy French convoy that included the freighter SS Bangkok, supposedly laden with 3,000 tonnes (3,000 long tons; 3,300 short tons) of rubber, which had already been unloaded. Her sister Fearless was ordered to board and capture Bangkok but she was thwarted by gunfire from Coastal artillery off the port of Nemours, Algeria. A few days later, Fury and four other destroyers escorted Sheffield, Renown and Ark Royal in Operation Winch, which delivered a dozen Hurricane fighters to Malta. Beginning on 24 April, Fury and Force H covered Argus flying off more Hurricanes as well as the destroyers of the 5th Destroyer Flotilla sailing to Malta.

In early May she was part of a destroyer screen with five other destroyers for the battleship Queen Elizabeth and the light cruisers Naiad, Fiji and Gloucester which were joining the Mediterranean Fleet. This was part of Operation Tiger which included a supply convoy taking tanks to the Middle East and the transfer of warships. Fury and her sisters had their Two-Speed Destroyer Sweep (TSDS) minesweeping gear rigged to allow them to serve as fast minesweepers en route to Malta. Despite this, one merchant ship was sunk by mines and another damaged. Later that month, she participated in Operation Splice, another mission in which the carriers Ark Royal and Furious flew off fighters for Malta. Force H was ordered to join the escort of Convoy WS 8B in the North Atlantic on 24 May, after the Battle of the Denmark Strait on 23 May but they were directed to search for German battleship Bismarck and the heavy cruiser Prinz Eugen on 25 May. Heavy seas increased fuel consumption for all of the escorts and Forester was forced to return to Gibraltar to refuel later that day, before rejoining the capital ships of Force H on 29 May, after Bismarck had been sunk. In early June the destroyer participated in two more aircraft delivery missions to Malta (Operations Rocket and Tracer). On 22 June, the 8th Destroyer Flotilla was sent to intercept a German supply ship spotted heading towards the French coast. The next day they intercepted MV Alstertor which was scuttled by her crew upon the approach of the British ships that rescued the crew and 78 British POWs taken from ships sunk by German raiders. In late June, Fury screened Ark Royal and Furious as they flew off more fighters for Malta in Operation Railway.

Another Malta convoy (Operation Substance) was conducted in mid-July, escorted by Force H and elements of the Home Fleet and another in early August (Operation Style), albeit with only Force H covering the convoy. Several weeks later, Fury participated in Operation Mincemeat, during which Force H escorted a minelayer to Livorno to lay its mines while Ark Royal's aircraft attacked Northern Sardinia as a diversion. In late September, the destroyer escorted another convoy to Malta in Operation Halberd.

=== Arctic Waters 1942–1943 ===
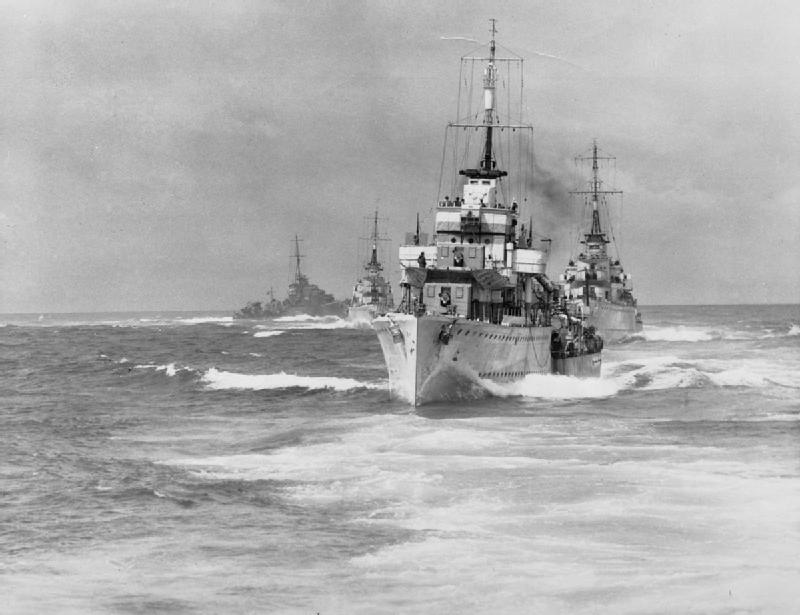
A flotilla of destroyers led by Fury at Scapa Flow, 1942

Fury was transferred home in October and briefly joined the Greenock Special Escort Division. By December she had rejoined the 8th Destroyer FLotilla of the Home Fleet and began a refit in a Humber shipyard. On 15 February 1942 she rejoined the 8th Destroyer Flotilla at Scapa Flow for service with the Arctic convoys. In March Fury escorted the covering force for Convoy QP 6 and Convoy PQ 12. On 11–14 March, together with seven other destroyers, she attempted to intercept the German battleship Tirpitz as the latter sailed from Narvik to Trondheim. The Germans spotted the destroyer force and delayed Tirpitz's sailing date to avoid them. Fury and the destroyer Eclipse escorted Convoy PQ 13 beginning on 23 March, later reinforced by the light cruiser Trinidad. A severe storm from 25 to 27 March scattered the convoy and the escorts were detailed to find the stragglers and reassemble the convoy.

Fury had to find and refuel the converted whaler HMT Sumba and found the merchantman SS Harpalion en route as she rejoined the convoy the next day. On the morning of 29 March, Trinidad and Fury encountered the German destroyers Z24, Z25, and Z26 as they attempted to rendezvous with another part of the scattered convoy. The leading destroyer, Z26, was badly damaged by Trinidad and attempted to break contact, but was tracked by the cruiser's radar and re-engaged at a range of 2,900 yards (2,700 m). Trinidad fired one torpedo at Z26, but it circled around and struck the cruiser. The detonation caused her speed to drop to 8 knots (15 km/h; 9.2 mph) and allowed the German ship to disengage. Fury pursued her until they encountered the convoy and Fury turned back to screen Trinidad after firing two salvoes by mistake at Eclipse. Fury then escorted Trinidad into the Kola Inlet where they arrived the following morning.

Fury remained in Murmansk until 10 March, when she screened Convoy QP 10 through to Iceland. She escorted the distant cover force of the Home Fleet as Trinidad attempted to sail home from Murmansk in mid-May, but the cruiser was sunk en route by German bombers. Fury then was a part of the Home Fleet as it provided distant cover for Convoy PQ 16 and Convoy QP 12 later in the month. The ship was assigned as part of the close escort for Convoy QP 17 at the end of June. En route she made an unsuccessful attack on U-456 with the destroyer Wilton and corvette Lotus on 2 July, before the convoy was ordered to disperse under the threat of German surface attack.

Fury returned to the Mediterranean in early August and was one of the close escorts of Force X for Operation Pedestal in mid-August. As the convoy passed through the Sicilian Narrows between Tunisia and Sicily, the ship used her TSDS gear to sweep for mines. During the early morning of 13 August, she attempted to engage MS 31 as the latter was firing two torpedoes that sank the freighter SS Glenorchy. Fury then escorted the damaged Nelson back to Britain for repairs.

On 9 September 1942 she joined the escort for Convoy PQ 18 but was detached on 17 September to the returning Convoy QP 14. The ship was given a brief refit on the Humber in November before resuming convoys to Russia. The following month, Fury escorted the Convoy JW 51A and Convoy RA 51 to and from Murmansk then Convoy RA 53 in February 1943.

=== 1943–1944 ===
In mid-March, successes by U-boats caused the Admiralty to transfer destroyers from the Home Fleet to escort duties in the North Atlantic. Fury was assigned to the 4th Escort Group. In April the group escorted Convoy HX 231, Convoy HX 234 and Convoy ONS 5 (where they drove off U-boat wolfpacks). In May she escorted Convoy ON 184 before beginning a brief refit on the Humber.

On 17 June, Fury escorted Home Fleet units to reinforce the Mediterranean Fleet for the Sicily landings. On 10 July she formed part of the covering force for the landings. On 1 September she screened the battleships Warspite and Valiant and the light cruisers Orion and Mauritius as they bombarded Reggio Calabria in support of Operation Baytown, the occupation of southernmost mainland Italy. A week later, she was part of the covering force for the Allied invasion of Italy at Salerno. After the surrender of Italy, Fury was one of the ships that escorted units of the Italian Fleet into Malta for their surrender and then to Alexandria, Egypt, arriving on 17 September.

A few days later, the ship was assigned to support Allied forces in the Dodecanese Campaign. On 20–21 September, she loaded 53 long tons (54 t) of supplies and 340 men of the Queen's Own Royal West Kent Regiment at Haifa, Palestine, to reinforce the British garrison on Leros. Fury, Faulknor and Eclipse were diverted from the campaign on 1 October to escort the battleships King George V and Howe from Alexandria to Malta. Six days later, the three destroyers screened the light cruisers Penelope and Sirius as they patrolled the Dodecanese searching for German shipping, although Eclipse had to return to Alexandria early for repairs to her steering. On the morning of 7 October, they encountered a small convoy south of Levitha. The cruisers sank the escorting trawler Uj 2111 while the destroyers sank the 5,216 GRT freighter SS Olympos; all of the ships engaged the barges at very short range and sank six of the seven. As the ships withdrew, they were repeatedly attacked by German aircraft that damaged Penelope. On the night of 15/16 November she bombarded Leros with the destroyers Exmoor and ORP Krakowiak On 29 November, Fury helped to escort the torpedoed Birmingham to Alexandria.

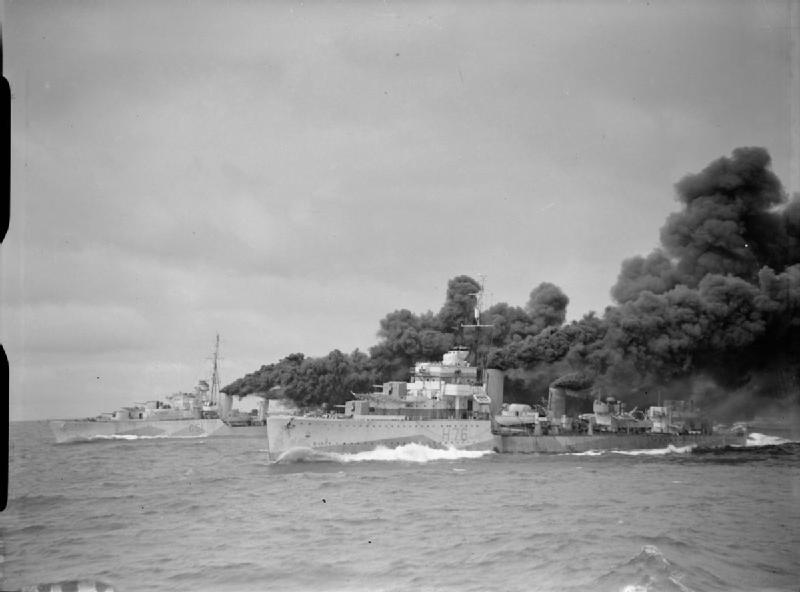
Fury (in the foreground) and Ashanti laying a smoke screen during manoeuvres in preparation for the Second Front. Photograph taken from Faulknor.

In December she was converted at Gibraltar for use as a convoy escort in a refit that lasted until February 1944. Upon its completion, the ship rejoined the 8th Destroyer Flotilla in the Mediterranean for several months before rejoining the Home Fleet where they arrived on 11 May. After several weeks of training in preparation for her role as a shore bombardment ship during the Normandy landings, Fury sailed from Scapa to HMNB Portsmouth on 26 May. The ship was assigned to Bombardment Force E, supporting Juno Beach and the 3rd Canadian Infantry Division and No. 48 (Royal Marine) Commando assaulting the beach.

Fury and Faulknor left the Solent on 5 June as the escort for the minesweepers of Convoy J-1. She arrived at the beachhead and took up her bombardment position on 6 June where, along with Faulknor and the destroyers Venus, Stevenstone and the Free French La Combattante, she carried out a preliminary bombardment of the area west of Courseulles and then gunfire support as requested. The ship returned to Portsmouth periodically for supplies as needed.

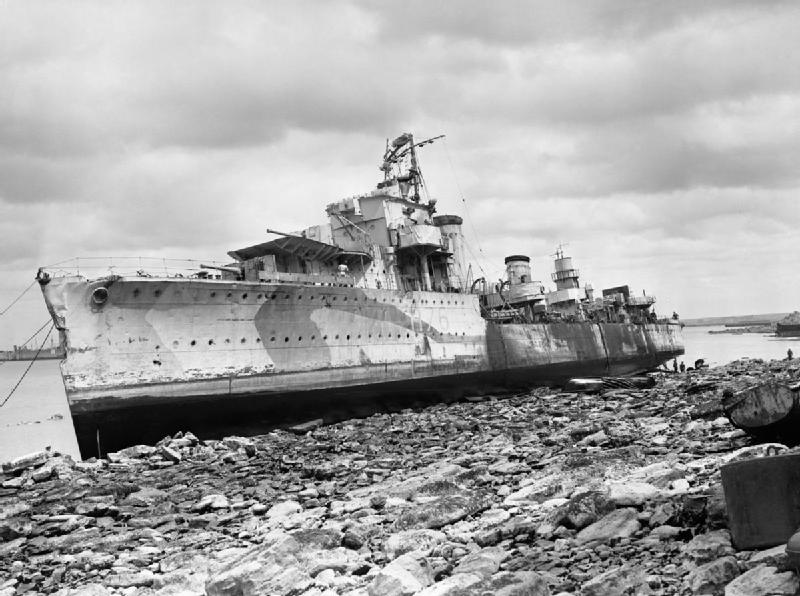
Fury high and dry on the beach at Arromanches after she had been mined and driven ashore in a gale on 21 June

At 10:38 on the morning of 21 June, Fury detonated a ground mine off Juno Beach during a gale and the navy decided to tow her into the British Mulberry harbour at Arromanches where her damage could be evaluated. While waiting for a tugboat, she took on a 6° list to starboard from flooding. The Dutch tug Thames began towing the ship at 13:25; at 21:14, Fury accidentally collided with the stern of a freighter anchored outside the Mulberry, damaging her port side above the waterline, and the towline snapped at 21:49 when she struck another ship several times. She let go her anchor after drifting clear, but it almost immediately started dragging under the pressure of the wind and waves and the salvage ship Lincoln Salvor was secured alongside to steady Fury. Another tug made a towline fast at 22:18, but it immediately snapped when the tug began to pull forward. Lincoln Salvor had to cast off as her wooden hull was being damaged by bumping into Fury's hull and six other tugboats attempted to tow the destroyer clear of the shipping in the Mulberry but failed. Fury struck at least three other ships, including petrol and ammunition ships before she was driven ashore at 01:30. Her crew was able to walk to Arromanches at about 05:30 once the tide went out. She was refloated on 5 July and towed back to England. A survey declared her a constructive total loss, and the ship was sold to Thos. W. Ward by BISCO. Fury was towed to Briton Ferry to be scrapped, arriving there on 18 September 1944.

== Bibliography ==
- Admiralty Historical Section (2007). The Royal Navy and the Arctic Convoys. Naval Staff Histories. Abingdon, UK: Whitehall History in association with Routledge. ISBN 978-0-7146-5284-9.
- Admiralty Historical Section (2003). Naval Operations of the Campaign in Norway: April–June 1940. London: Frank Cass. ISBN 0-7146-5119-2.
- The Royal Navy and the Mediterranean: November 1940 – December 1941. Whitehall histories, Naval Staff histories. Vol. II. London: Whitehall History in association with Frank Cass. 2002. ISBN 0-7146-5205-9.
- Colledge, J. J.; Warlow, Ben (2006) [1969]. Ships of the Royal Navy: The Complete Record of All Fighting Ships of the Royal Navy from the 15th Century to the Present (3rd Rev ed.). London: Chatham Publishing. ISBN 978-1-86176-281-8. OCLC 67375475.
- Crabb, Brian James (2014). Operation Pedestal: The story of Convoy WS21S in August 1942. England: Shaun Tyas. ISBN 978-1-907730-19-1.
- English, John (1993). Amazon to Ivanhoe: British Standard Destroyers of the 1930s. Kendal, England: World Ship Society. ISBN 0-905617-64-9.
- Evans, Arthur S. (2010). Destroyer Down: An Account of HM Destroyer Losses 1939–1945. Barnsley, South Yorkshire, UK: Pen & Sword Maritime. ISBN 978-1-84884-270-0.
- Friedman, Norman (2009). British Destroyers From Earliest Days to the Second World War. Annapolis, Maryland: Naval Institute Press. ISBN 978-1-59114-081-8.
- Haarr, Geirr H. (2010). The Battle for Norway: April–June 1940. Barnsley: Seaforth Publishing. ISBN 978-1-84832-057-4.
- Langtree, Charles (2002). The Kelly's: British J, K, and N Class Destroyers of World War II. Annapolis, Maryland: Naval Institute Press. ISBN 1-55750-422-9.
- Lenton, H. T. (1998). British & Empire Warships of the Second World War. Annapolis, Maryland: Naval Institute Press. ISBN 1-55750-048-7.
- O'Hara, Vincent P. (2012). In Passage Perilous : Malta and the Convoy Battles of June 1942. Bloomington, Indiana: Indiana University Press. ISBN 978-0-253-00603-5.
- Pigott, Peter (2005). Royal Transport: An Inside Look at the History of Royal Travel. Toronto: Dundurn Press. ISBN 978-1-55002-572-9.
- Rohwer, Jürgen (2005). Chronology of the War at Sea 1939–1945: The Naval History of World War Two (Third Revised ed.). Annapolis, Maryland: Naval Institute Press. ISBN 1-59114-119-2.
- Smith, Peter C. (2004). Destroyer Leader: The Story of HMS Faulnor 1935–46 (3rd revised and expanded ed.). Barnsley, South Yorkshire, UK: Pen & Sword Maritime. ISBN 1-84415-121-2.
- Whitley, M. J. (1988). Destroyers of World War Two: An International Encyclopedia. Annapolis, Maryland: Naval Institute Press. ISBN 0-87021-326-1.
