= Japara (disambiguation) =

Japara could be:

- SS Japara, various ships
- Japara Healthcare, an Australian aged care provider, now part of Calvary Health Care
- A waxed cotton fabric
