= MV Alstertor =

History
- Name: Rose (1938–1939); Alstertor (1940–1941)
- Owner: Anders Jahres Rederi A/S, Sandefjord 1938–1939; Rob. M. Sloman 1939–1941
- Port of registry: Sandefjord (1938–1939); Hamburg (1939–1941)
- Builder: Öresundsvarvet, Landskrona, Sweden
- Yard number: 48
- Launched: 22 January 1938
- Completed: 6 June 1938
- Identification: Call sign LJWX (1938–1939); Call sign DKAW (1939–41)
- Fate: Scuttled on 23 June 1941

General characteristics
- Type: Refrigerated cargo ship
- Tonnage: 3,039 GRT, 4,650 DWT (1938–1940)
- Length: 336 ft 3 in (102.49 m)
- Beam: 45 ft 7 in (13.89 m)
- Depth: 25 ft 11 in (7.90 m)
- Installed power: 3,200 bhp (2,400 kW)
- Propulsion: 9-cylinder diesel, by Burmeister & Wain, Copenhagen
- Speed: 16 knots (30 km/h)

MV Alstertor was a refrigerated cargo ship built in 1938 for Anders Jahres Rederi A/S of Sandefjord, Norway by Oresundsvarvet, Landskrona, Sweden as MV Rose. In 1939 a German ship-owning firm, Rob. M. Sloman, bought her to transport fruit between Santos, Brazil and Hamburg. In 1940 the Kriegsmarine requisitioned her and converted her into a support ship for naval operations in the Atlantic.

== Description ==
The ship was 336 ft 3 in (102.49 m) long, with a beam of 45 ft 7 in (13.89 m). She had a depth of 25 ft 11 in (7.90 m). She was assessed as 3,039 GRT, 4,650 DWT.

The ship was powered by a Burmeister & Wain 9-50VF-90 two-stroke Single Cycle, Single Action diesel engine, which had nine cylinders of 19 11/16 inches (50.0 cm) diameter by 35 7/16 inches (90.0 cm) stroke driving a single screw propeller. Rated at 606 nhp, it could propel her at 15.5 knots (28.7 km/h).

== Early history ==
Öresundsvarvet built Rose as yard number 38 at Landskrona, Sweden for Anders Jahre Reederi, Sandefjord, Norway. She was launched on 22 January 1938, and completed on 6 June. She was registered at Sandefjord and her call sign was LJWX. In 1939 Rob. M. Sloman bought her and renamed her Alstertor. She was re-registered in Hamburg and her call sign was changed to DKAW.

== Fruit transport ==
On the 4 July 1939 Alstertor left Hamburg to collect oranges and bananas from Santos.

== World War II ==
=== Crew ===
The crew of the Alstertor consisted of 98 officers and crew drawn from Kriegsmarine and German merchant marine. There were four Kriegsmarine and ten merchant service officers, eight Kriegsmarine petty officers (German: Obermaat or Maat) and 46 Kriegsmarine crew and 30 merchant service crew.

A further 62 naval ratings of various rank were embarked for the last cruise. These were meant to be supplied to other ships that didn't have a full complement.

=== First wartime cruise ===
At the start of World War II, Alstertor was moored in Hamburg. She was requisitioned by the Kriegsmarine and quickly refitted as a troop and supply ship in preparation for Operation Weserübung, the German invasion of Norway. Once loaded with munitions, she sailed for Stavanger on the 19 April 1940, where she unloaded her cargo of a 10.5 cm FlaK 38 shore defence artillery piece on 28 April 1940 and returned in May.

In June 1940 the ship again sailed for Norway with a cargo of munitions that were offloaded in Trondheim. In Trondheim, Alstertor sailed with a contingent of Austrian Alpine troops, known as the Gebirgsjäger, that were debarked at Narvik on about 16 June 1940. Alstertor remained in Narvik for two days, while she embarked a contingent of wounded soldiers that were to be taken back to Trondheim for treatment. While in Trondheim, Alstertor was attacked from the air, but was unharmed.

Alstertor repeated the journey between Narvik and Trondheim three times. Each time, troops were taken to Narvik and wounded troops were brought back on the return journey. In September 1940, Alstertor embarked police and members of the German Labour Front, whom were taken to Hammerfest to be put to work, building roads. On the return journey, Alstertor had to put into Trondjhem, due to a failure of her engine. At the end of November, Alstertor travelled back to Hamburg.

=== Outfitting and supplies ===
Upon arrival in Hamburg, extensive modifications to expand the available space for supplies were made to Alstertor. The forward holds were converted into prison cells for between 300 and 350 prisoners. To increase Alstertor defensive capability, four 2cm anti-aircraft guns were fitted on deck. Extra tanks containing either oil or water were fitted on deck. Containers measuring 6 square yards (5.0 m^{2}) were also placed on the main deck to store large calibre ammunition and torpedo parts.

For the next cruise and last cruise that Alstertor made, the following supplies were taken on:

- 1,500 15 cm (5.9 in) shells.
- A large number of smaller calibre shells.
- 10 torpedoes
- 20 leather hoses, approximately 22 yards (20 m) long. These were to be used to supply oil from another ship.
- 2 Arado Ar 196 seaplanes.
- 300 2nd class, 158 1st class and 1 Knight Insignia Iron Crosses. These awards were for the men and officers of Raider 33, known as German auxiliary cruiser Pinguin.
- A large number of provisions e.g. tinned goods and sacks of potatoes.
- 50 scuttling charges.

=== Last cruise ===
On 15 January 1941, Alstertor sailed from Hamburg, through the English Channel by night and arrived in Brest three days later, where it embarked additional naval personnel. Alstertor remained in Brest for a full week, while minor repairs were completed and ship refuelled. Alstertor sailed on 25 January 1941 and was escorted during the first day by two E-boats.

On or about 8 February 1941, Alstertor made contact with ship of 8000 tons to receive secret orders. At the end of February Alstertor met a 10,000 ton tanker. It shipped oil to Alstertor and in turn supplied provisions and munitions to the tanker.

At the beginning of March, Alstertor made contact with the German auxiliary cruiser Pinguin (known as "Raider F", or "schiff 33") and German auxiliary cruiser Kormoran ("Raider G", schiff 41) in the Indian Ocean. Alstertor accompanied Pinguin and Kormoran to the Kerguelen Islands, where the transfer of supplies took place in a sheltered bay. Kormoran was refuelled, with 750 15cm shells and 20mm ammunition. On the 14 March 1941, Alstertor rendezvoused with the German auxiliary cruiser Komet, in the same bay and was supplied with munitions. Pinguin moored for 11 days in Gazelle Bay, while receiving supplies that included 600 15cm shells and 20mm ammunition, an aircraft in a crate, as well as four torpedoes and embarking between 40 and 50 naval ratings. In return, Pinguin transferred 500 cases of eggs to Alstertor, that had been seized from Duquesa that was captured by the Admiral Scheer in the South Atlantic in December, 1941. Admiral Scheer had passed Duquesa to Pinguin, to be stripped of supplies. Duquesa remained alongside Pinguin for four weeks before being scuttled.

On the 25 March 1941, Alstertor left to meet Raider 36, the German auxiliary cruiser Orion in the Indian Ocean,. rendezvousing on the 10 April 1940. Orion had originally planned to debark prisoners to Alstertor but these were transferred to another ship. Alstertor also replenished Raider 16, the German auxiliary cruiser Atlantis.

==== Prison ship ====
At this point in the cruise, Alstertor changed her function from one of supply into a prison ship. Alstertor cruised off the coast of South Africa for two weeks until the 24 April 1941 when the crew were ordered, in a transmission from the Norddeich Short Wave Station, to return to port. After four days sailing, the orders were countermanded by a new order to rendezvous with Pinguin in the Indian Ocean and embark prisoners. However, after ten days sailing, the crew were informed that the auxiliary cruiser, Pinguin had been sunk. Alstertor was ordered to sail to a position in the Atlantic and embark prisoners from Babitonga. On the 15 June 1941, Alstertor met Babitonga that was disguised as the US ship Japara at position 13° N. 45° W. Alstertor embarked 79 people that combined, made up the crews of two ships, Rabaul and Trafalgar that were sunk by the auxiliary cruiser Atlantis. The prisoners had been transferred to Babitonga from Atlantis on 30 May 1941. A quantity of baggage was also loaded aboard Alstertor, that was taken from the Egyptian liner Zamzam, that Atlantis had sunk on the 17 April 1941.

=== Scuttling ===
After the transfer was completed Alstertor changed course to head back to port, while Babitonga set course south. At 9:44 on 22 June 1941 Alstertor was sighted by ocean boarding vessel HMS Marsdale. A later signal sent by Marsdale reported that the vessel had disappeared at position 35° 52' N., 18° 42' W travelling at 17 knots. The vessel was reported to resemble Alstertor.

On the 14:30 on 22 June 1941, the 8th Destroyer Flotilla consisting of the Faulknor, Fearless, Foxhound, Fury and Forester was ordered to patrol in the vicinity of 42° 00'N., 12° 00'W, in a search for Alstertor. At the same time, Dudley North, Vice-Admiral Commanding, North Atlantic ordered two Consolidated Catalina flying boats to patrol the area where Alstertor was suspected to be. At 19:45, Catalina W8410 reported she was engaging the enemy at position 37° 17' N., 16° 20' W on a course 045° at 12 knots. At 21:00, Alstertor was bombed but no damage was taken. Her position at that point was then 37° 30' N., 16° 04'W., with her course and speed as before. At 2245 the second Catalina (W8415), bombed Alstertor without effective damage. On the 23 June 1941, at 00:30 hour, the aircraft lost touch with the ship.

During this period, the crew of Alstertor were in the utmost confusion. They had assumed that the journey home would have been event free, but when the aircraft appeared, a senior naval officer, Oberleutnant zur See Block, had taken command. When Block saw the Catalina's drop marker flares to disclose Alstertor's position, Block assumed the aircraft were signalling approaching warships and ordered all Alstertor codebooks to be burned. This left Alstertor's radio operator unable to decipher incoming messages from German Naval Command, that would have provided instructions on how to get home to port safely.

At 14:42, 23 June 1941, Alstertor was again sighted, at a position off Cape Finisterre, by the destroyer flotilla, which had been operating on a modified conforming curve of search.

By 16:09, Alstertor had stopped and was abandoning ship. At 16:35 she was scuttled. The survivors, consisting of the entire crew and the 79 prisoners who had been on board, were picked up by Faulknor, Fearless and Fury.
