= Convoy SC 104 =

Convoy during naval battles of the Second World War

- Part of World War II
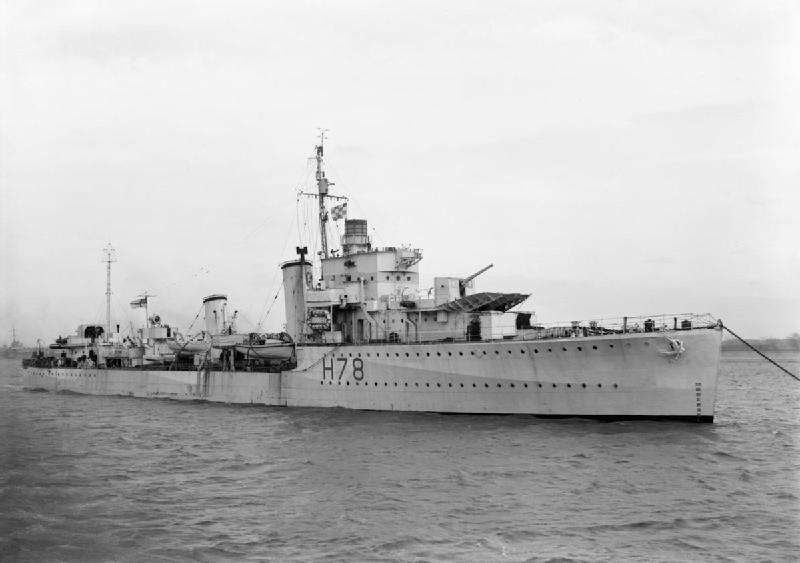
- HMS Fame in September 1942
Date	12–16 October 1942
Location	North Atlantic
Result	German victory

Belligerents
(Nazi Germany) Germany	United Kingdom

Commanders and leaders
CinC:Admiral Karl Dönitz	Commodore: CAPT F H Taylor RN; Escort: CDR R Heathcote

Strength
8 U-boats	48 freighters 2 destroyers 4 corvettes

Casualties and losses
2 U-boats sunk 2 U-boats damaged 50 dead	8 freighters sunk 2 destroyers damaged 216 dead

Convoy SC 104 was the 104th of the numbered series of World War II slow convoys of merchant ships from Sydney, Cape Breton Island to Liverpool. During October 1942, a U-boat wolf pack sank eight ships from the convoy. The convoy escorts sank two of the attacking submarines.

== Background ==
As western Atlantic coastal convoys brought an end to the second happy time, Admiral Karl Dönitz the Befehlshaber der U-Boote (BdU) or commander in chief of U-boats, shifted focus to the mid-Atlantic to avoid aircraft patrols. Although convoy routing was less predictable in the mid-ocean, Dönitz anticipated that the increased numbers of U-boats being produced would be able to effectively search for convoys with the advantage of intelligence gained through B-Dienst decryption of British Naval Cypher Number 3. However, only 20 percent of the 180 trans-Atlantic convoys sailing from the end of July 1942 until the end of April 1943 lost ships to U-boat attack.

Forty-seven ships departed New York City on 3 October 1942 and were met by Mid-Ocean Escort Force Group B-6 consisting of the E and F-class destroyer Fame and V and W-class destroyer Viscount, with the Norwegian-manned Flower-class corvettes Potentilla, Eglantine, Montbretia, and Acanthus and the convoy rescue ship Goathland.

Opposing this force was the U-boat Wolf pack Wotan comprising 8 boats: U-221, U-258, U-356, U-607, U-618, U-661, U-353, and U-254.

== Action ==
The convoy was found and reported by U-258 on 11 October, and the other Wotan boats were ordered to join. By the evening of 12 October, U-258 had been joined by U-221 and U-356, and during the night of 12/13 October these boats attacked. U-258 and U-356 were unsuccessful, being driven off by the escorts, but U-221 was able to sink three ships: the Norwegian freighters Senta, and Fagersten, and the British freighter Ashworth.

On the 13th the three U-boats continued to shadow the convoy, and were joined during the day by five other boats. On the night of the 13/14 October the wolf pack attacked again. This time U-221 sank two ships: the American freighter Susana and the British whale factory ship Southern Empress. U-607 torpedoed the Greek freighter Nellie, which later sank, but was itself attacked and severely damaged, and was forced to return to France for repairs. U-661 torpedoed the Yugoslavian freighter Nikolina Matkovic, and U-618 torpedoed the Empire Mersey.

Throughout 15 October the Wotan boats shadowed SC 104, but were unable to mount any successful attacks that night. On 15 October, Viscount detected U-661 in fog, and attacked with gunfire, ramming and depth charges. U-661 was destroyed, but Viscount was also damaged, and had to finish the voyage as part of the convoy.

On 16 October U-353 was sighted by Fame, which attacked and destroyed her by ramming, again suffering damage in the process. Command of the escort passed to LtCdr C.A. Monsen in Potentilla, who was able to make an attack on a contact later that day. No identification was made, or result credited, but post-war examination shows that U-254 was severely damaged in this attack and forced to retire to base.

On 16 and 17 October SC 104 came in range of allied air patrols, long–range B-24 Liberators and Catalina flying boats. These were able to break up any further attacks and on the 17th, Dönitz ceased further operations against SC 104. The remainder of the voyage was unhindered, and the convoy reached Liverpool on 21 October. SC 104 lost 8 ships of 44,000 tons, with 2 escorts damaged, and saw the destruction of 2 U-boats with the damaging of 2 more.

== Ships in convoy ==
Name	Flag	Dead	Tonnage gross register tons (GRT)	Cargo	Notes
Senta (1917)	Norway		3,785	Steel & woodpulp	Sunk by U-221 12/13 October
Ashworth (1920)	United Kingdom	49	5,227	Bauxite	Sunk by U-221 13 October
Fagersten (1921)	Norway	19	2,342	Steel & lumber	Sunk by U-221 13 October
Susana (1914)	United States	38	5,929	Valuable general cargo, mail	Sunk by U-221 14 October
Southern Empress (1914)	United Kingdom	48	12,398	Fuel oil	Sunk by U-221 14 October
Nellie (1913)	Greece	32	4,826	Steel & lumber	Sunk by U-607 14 October
Nikolina Matkovic (1918)	Yugoslavia	14	3,672	Sugar & lumber	Sunk by U-661 14 October
Empire Mersey (1920)	United Kingdom	16	5,791	General cargo including government stores	Sunk by U-618 14 October
Merchant Royal (1928)	United Kingdom		5,008	General cargo	Carried convoy commodore Capt F H Taylor DSC RN
Mariposa (1914)	United Kingdom		3,807	Explosives, steel & timber	Ship's master was convoy vice-commodore
Aghios Spyridon (1905)	Greece		3,338	Grain	Veteran of convoy SC 94
Anna (1919)	Greece		5,173	Grain and general cargo	
Anna N Goulandris (1921)	Greece		4,358	Grain	Survived this convoy and convoy HX 300
Bernhard (1924)	Norway		3,563	Bauxite	Survived this convoy and convoy HX 300
Bonde (1936)	Norway		1,570	General cargo	Returned to Canada; sunk 7 months later in Convoy ONS 5
Boreas (1920)	Norway		2,801	Sugar	
Boston City (1920)	United Kingdom		2,870	General cargo including explosives	Veteran of convoy SC 94 and convoy ON 127
British Progress (1927)	United Kingdom		4,581	petrol	
British Renown (1928)	United Kingdom		6,997	petrol	
Campus (1925)	United Kingdom		3,667	Steel and wood	Survived this convoy and convoy ONS 5
Carslogie (1924)	United Kingdom		3,786	Steel and wood	
Charles Carroll (1942)	United States		7,191	Cased petrol & explosives	Liberty ship
Cydonia (1927)	United Kingdom		3,517	Grain	Survived this convoy and convoy ONS 5
Disa (1918)	Sweden		2,002	Flour	
Empire Lightning (1940)	United Kingdom		6,942	phosphates	Collided with Milcrest of convoy ON 132
Empire Mouflon (1921)	United Kingdom		3,234	Explosives & general cargo	Survived this convoy and convoy HX 300
Empire Waterhen (1920)	United Kingdom		6,004	General cargo	
Garnes (1930)	Norway		1,559		Survived this convoy and convoy SC 107
George B. McClellan (1942)	United States		7,181	Vitriol, cased petrol & explosives	Liberty ship
Georgios P (1903)	Greece		4,052	General cargo	Survived this convoy and convoy SC 122
Gothland (1932)	United Kingdom		1,286		Rescue ship
Gudvor (1928)	Norway		2,280		Survived this convoy, convoy SC 122 and convoy ONS 5
Inger Lise (1939)	Norway		1,582	lumber	Veteran of convoy SC 94
Ingerfem (1912)	Norway		3,987	Grain	Veteran of convoy SC 94
John Hathorn (1942)	United States		7,176	Cased petrol & explosives	Liberty ship
Lido (1930)	Norway		1,918	Flour	
Liverpool Loyalist (1932)	United Kingdom		1,416		
Llangollen (1928)	United Kingdom		5,056	General cargo	
Mars (1925)	Netherlands		1,582	Flour	Veteran of convoy SC 94
Nea (1921)	Norway		1,877	lumber	Veteran of convoy SC 26
Ozark (1919)	United States		2,689		Lost rudder and diverted to Iceland
Peterston (1925)	United Kingdom		4,680	Grain & lumber	
Porjus (1906)	Sweden		2,965	phosphates	Returned to Canada; also returned from convoy SC 121 and survived convoy SC 122
Prinses Maria-Pia (1938)	Belgium		2,588	Sugar & bombs	
Ramava	Latvia		2,141	lumber	
Reigh Count (1907)	Panama		4,657	Explosives & valuable cargo	
Robert Morris (1942)	United States		7,176	Cased petrol & explosives	Liberty ship
Rocha (1933)	Panama		1,471		
Roxane (1929)	United Kingdom		7,813	Fuel oil	
Saintonge (1936)	United Kingdom		9,386	Fuel oil	Survived this convoy and convoy HX 300
Saluta (1906)	United Kingdom		6,261	Fuel oil	
Sinnington Court (1928)	United Kingdom		6,910		Survived this convoy and convoy SC 121
Souliotis (1917)	Greece		4,299	Steel & lumber	
Suderoy (1913)	Norway		7,562	Fuel oil	Survived this convoy and convoy SC 121
Theomitor (1910)	Greece		4,427	Steel & lumber	
Vinga (1927)	Norway		7,321	Furnace fuel oil	
William Johnson (1942)	United States		7,191	Cased petrol & explosives	Liberty Ship

== Losses ==
U-boat losses
Date	Number	Type	Captain	Casualties	Position	Cause	By
15 October 1942	U-661	VIIC	Oberleutnant zur See Erich Lilienfeld	44	53°42′N 35°56′W	Gunfire, depth charge, ramming	HMS Viscount
16 October 1942	U-353	VIIC	Kapitänleutnant Wolfgang Römer	6	53°54′N 29°30′W	Depth charge	HMS Fame

== See also ==
- Convoy Battles of World War II
