= German submarine U-353 =

German World War II submarine

History

Nazi Germany
- Name: U-353
- Ordered: 9 October 1939
- Builder: Flensburger Schiffbau-Gesellschaft, Flensburg
- Yard number: 472
- Laid down: 30 March 1940
- Launched: 11 November 1941
- Commissioned: 31 March 1942
- Fate: Sunk on 16 October 1942

General characteristics
- Class & type: Type VIIC submarine
- Displacement: 769 tonnes (757 long tons) surfaced; 871 t (857 long tons) submerged
- Length: 67.10 m (220 ft 2 in) o/a; 50.50 m (165 ft 8 in) pressure hull
- Beam: 6.20 m (20 ft 4 in) o/a; 4.70 m (15 ft 5 in) pressure hull
- Height: 9.60 m (31 ft 6 in)
- Draught: 4.74 m (15 ft 7 in)
- Installed power: 2,800–3,200 PS (2,100–2,400 kW; 2,800–3,200 bhp) (diesels); 750 PS (550 kW; 740 shp) (electric)
- Propulsion: 2 shafts; 2 × diesel engines; 2 × electric motors
- Speed: 17.7 knots (32.8 km/h; 20.4 mph) surfaced; 7.6 knots (14.1 km/h; 8.7 mph) submerged
- Range: 8,500 nmi (15,700 km; 9,800 mi) at 10 knots (19 km/h; 12 mph) surfaced; 80 nmi (150 km; 92 mi) at 4 knots (7.4 km/h; 4.6 mph) submerged
- Test depth: 230 m (750 ft); Crush depth: 250–295 m (820–968 ft)
- Complement: 4 officers, 40–56 enlisted
- Armament: 5 × 53.3 cm (21 in) torpedo tubes (four bow, one stern); 14 × torpedoes; 1 × 8.8 cm (3.46 in) deck gun (220 rounds); 1 × 2 cm (0.79 in) C/30 AA gun

Service record
- Part of: 5th U-boat Flotilla; 31 March – 30 September 1942; 1st U-boat Flotilla; 1 – 16 October 1942
- Identification codes: M 44 455
- Commanders: Oblt.z.S. Wolfgang Römer; 31 March – 16 October 1942
- Operations: 1 patrol: a. 22 – 24 September 1942; b. 25 September – 16 October 1942
- Victories: None

German submarine U-353 was a Type VIIC U-boat of Nazi Germany's Kriegsmarine during World War II. The submarine was laid down on 30 March 1940 at the Flensburger Schiffbau-Gesellschaft yard at Flensburg, launched on 11 November 1941, and commissioned on 31 March 1942 under the command of Oberleutnant zur See Wolfgang Römer. After training with the 5th U-boat Flotilla based at Kiel, U-353 was transferred to the 1st U-boat Flotilla at Brest in France for front-line service from 1 October 1942.

U-353 was sunk on her first and only combat patrol at 15:02 GMT on 16 October 1942 in the North Atlantic after being rammed and depth-charged by the destroyer HMS Fame, in position 53°54′N 29°30′W, while about to attack Convoy SC 104. Six of the crew were killed and 39 survived the attack.

She did not sink any ships.

== Design ==
German Type VIIC submarines were preceded by the shorter Type VIIB submarines. U-353 had a displacement of 769 tonnes (757 long tons) when at the surface and 871 tonnes (857 long tons) while submerged. She had a total length of 67.10 m (220 ft 2 in), a pressure hull length of 50.50 m (165 ft 8 in), a beam of 6.20 m (20 ft 4 in), a height of 9.60 m (31 ft 6 in), and a draught of 4.74 m (15 ft 7 in). The submarine was powered by two Germaniawerft F46 four-stroke, six-cylinder supercharged diesel engines producing a total of 2,800 to 3,200 metric horsepower (2,060 to 2,350 kW; 2,760 to 3,160 shp) for use while surfaced, two AEG GU 460/8–27 double-acting electric motors producing a total of 750 metric horsepower (550 kW; 740 shp) for use while submerged. She had two shafts and two 1.23 m (4 ft) propellers. The boat was capable of operating at depths of up to 230 metres (750 ft).

The submarine had a maximum surface speed of 17.7 knots (32.8 km/h; 20.4 mph) and a maximum submerged speed of 7.6 knots (14.1 km/h; 8.7 mph). When submerged, the boat could operate for 80 nautical miles (150 km; 92 mi) at 4 knots (7.4 km/h; 4.6 mph); when surfaced, she could travel 8,500 nautical miles (15,700 km; 9,800 mi) at 10 knots (19 km/h; 12 mph). U-353 was fitted with five 53.3 cm (21 in) torpedo tubes (four fitted at the bow and one at the stern), fourteen torpedoes, one 8.8 cm (3.46 in) SK C/35 naval gun, 220 rounds, and a 2 cm (0.79 in) C/30 anti-aircraft gun. The boat had a complement of between forty-four and sixty.

== Service history ==
=== Commissioning and training ===
U-353 was ready for commissioning in early February 1942, but this was delayed until 31 March by ice in the Baltic Sea. Her U-Bootsabnahmekommission trials (UAK, "U-Boats Acceptance Commission") at Kiel was delayed by three weeks because of the number of U-boats already there, so she remained at Flensburg, performing exercises. The U-boat finally arrived at Kiel on about 21 April, taking the normal UAK trials in Kiel Fjord. She also entered the pressure dock at the Deutsche Werke shipyard and was tested to the equivalent depth of 100 metres (330 ft). The UAK trials lasted until about 20 May.

U-353 then proceeded to Rønne (on the Danish island of Bornholm, in the western Baltic), for silent running tests, but these were interrupted by the threat of Russian submarines. She consequently sailed to Danzig, arriving about 23 May, proceeding immediately to Königsberg, where she put into the Schichau shipyard for a few days for minor repairs. She then sailed to Gotenhafen (Gdnyia, Poland), where she spent about five days in torpedo firing exercises, and then to Hela (now Hel, Poland) for the Ausbildungsgruppe Front ("Training Group Front") technical and dive training, which lasted about four weeks. U-353 returned to Rönne for a week of silent running tests, then arrived back at Flensburg for final adjustments and crew leave on 11 July. There the boat was fitted with a Metox radar detector. In mid-August she sailed to Gdingen for tactical exercises, which lasted until early September. On 11 September U-353 arrived back at Kiel for fitting-out, fuelling, and embarked provisions and torpedoes.

=== Combat patrol ===
U-353 sailed from Kiel at 07:00 on 22 September 1942, accompanied by two other U-boats and for a short distance by two Sperrbrecher (lit. "Pathmaker", in English "Minesweeper"). She was provisioned for ten weeks and carried 130 tons of fuel oil. It was expected that she would remain at sea for just over eight weeks, before arriving at Brest, where she would join the 1st U-boat Flotilla.

She proceeded on the surface to Kristiansand in Norway at 5 knots (9.3 km/h; 5.8 mph), arriving about 07:00 on 24 September and topped up her fuel from two Norwegian oil lighters. She left Kristiansand at 07:00 the next day, hugging the Norwegian coast northwards at 4 knots (7.4 km/h; 4.6 mph). She was escorted by minesweepers and Vorpostenboote ("patrol boats"). On making Skudenes, near Stavanger, on the evening of 26 September, the escorts parted company, U-353 sailed west until she reached the 100-fathom line, then altered course northwards. The U-boat detected radar transmissions several times, and dived immediately. She continued north before altering course to the west to pass through the Rosengarten ("rose garden", the German naval slang term for a minefield) between Iceland and the Faroe Islands, encountering drifting mines several times. The U-boat then received orders from the BdU ("U-boat High Command") to proceed to a position roughly 400 miles west of Rockall.

=== Wolfpacks ===
U-353 took part in two wolfpacks, namely:

- Panther (6 – 12 October 1942)
- Leopard (12 – 16 October 1942)

==== Wolfpack 'Panther' ====
About 3 October, U-353 received another signal from the BdU reporting a convoy about 190 miles to the north-north-west, however heavy seas made reaching it difficult. About 5 October, she was ordered to abandon the attempt, and was later ordered to proceed to another position, arriving about 6 October, as one of nineteen U-boats forming the wolfpack 'Panther'.

U-353 was the seventh or eighth boat in the patrol line and remained in position for a week. On sighting a fast independently sailing ship at a range of about 4,000 yards, she altered course to intercept it, but lost contact. Early on 10 October, the U-boat sighted another ship, estimated to be of about 15,000 tons, sailing independently. The U-boat pursued her, but lost her in rapidly worsening weather, abandoning the chase and returning to the patrol line. The next day, 11 October, U-133 reported sighting a convoy of three fast ships and three destroyers, U-353 was one of several U-boats ordered to pursue them.

==== Wolfpack 'Leopard' ====
The detached U-boats were designated wolfpack 'Leopard', but were soon ordered to change course to close a larger convoy spotted by wolfpack 'Wolf' about 400 miles to the west. At 05:00 on 12 October, U-353 spotted an independently sailing merchant ship of 4,000 to 5,000 tons, and closed to attack, firing two torpedoes from a range of 2,000 yards. The ship promptly altered course, and the U-boat fired another torpedo from her stern tube. Two loud explosions were heard, and the ship was seen to break in two and sink. U-353 surfaced and closed at full speed, only to find U-133 already there and claiming the victory. Eventually the two captains agreed that U-353's torpedoes had forced the ship to change course into U-133's line of fire, and they agreed to share the credit. Ten minutes later another U-boat was sighted, U-618, which claimed to have sunk two ships. The U-boats then parted company to search for the convoy.

About noon on 12 October, U-353 was proceeding on the surface in daylight in company with two other U-boats, when a B-24 Liberator bomber from No. 120 Squadron RAF appeared out of low cloud and attacked. U-353 crash-dived, hearing depth charges explode some distance away. After an hour she resurfaced and searched for her companions, but found nothing.

==== Convoy SC 104 ====
At about 05:00 on 16 October, U-353 was proceeding at full speed on the surface in total darkness. The U-boat saw the shadows of ships all around, the nearest about five miles away. This ship, the corvette HMS Eglantine detected the U-boat by radar, promptly closed the range and opened fire with her guns. U-353 dived to 150 metres (490 ft) and was attacked with depth charges, sustaining minor damage. The attack lasted for an hour before the corvette withdrew. An hour later the U-boat surfaced, and set a course to intercept the convoy.

==== Sinking ====
At 13:05 the U-boat estimated that it was now about eight miles ahead of the convoy and submerged to use her hydrophones, proceeding dead slow at a depth of 20 metres (66 ft). On detecting propeller noise, the U-boat altered course to approach the convoy. After half an hour the hydrophone operator heard faint propeller noises approaching. The U-boat altered course again and after 15 minutes the operator again reported oncoming propeller noises. The captain ordered the U-boat to rise to periscope depth. Unknown to U-353, this was the destroyer HMS Fame, about two miles ahead of Convoy SC 104, which had gained a firm Asdic (sonar) contact, and increased speed to 15 knots to intercept the U-boat.

Suddenly there was a series of ear-splitting explosions, as Fame dropped a pattern of 10 depth charges. The lights in U-353 went out and water entered forward and aft through the hydrophone shafts. The electric motors stopped working, all but one of the depth gauges broke, and the aft hydroplanes were put out of action. U-353 went deeper, almost out of control as water poured in through the stern torpedo tube causing her to lose trim. The U-boat blew her tanks and surfaced, and the captain ordered the crew to prepare to abandon ship.

Fame was preparing for a hedgehog attack when the U-boat surfaced. The destroyer increased speed to 18 knots and opened fire with every weapon which could bear. Fame rammed U-353 forward, her bows hitting her a glancing blow, the U-boat scraped down her starboard side, the destroyer then dropped a pattern of five depth charges when the U-boat was abreast of her stern.

The survivors of U-353's crew leapt into the sea from the sinking U-boat and swam to safety. The commander, four officers and 14 ratings were picked up by Fame, another 20 men were rescued by the Norwegian corvette HNoMS Andenes. All were landed at Liverpool a few days later for interrogation and internment in a POW camp.

== See also ==
- Convoy SC 104

== Bibliography ==
- Busch, Rainer; Röll, Hans-Joachim (1999). German U-boat commanders of World War II : a biographical dictionary. Translated by Brooks, Geoffrey. London, Annapolis, Md: Greenhill Books, Naval Institute Press. ISBN 1-55750-186-6.
- Busch, Rainer; Röll, Hans-Joachim (1999). Der U-Boot-Krieg, 1939-1945: Deutsche U-Boot-Verluste von September 1939 bis Mai 1945 [German U-boat losses from September 1939 to May 1945] (in German). Vol. IV. Hamburg, Berlin, Bonn: Mittler. ISBN 3-8132-0514-2.
- Gröner, Erich; Jung, Dieter; Maass, Martin (1991). U-boats and Mine Warfare Vessels. German Warships 1815–1945. Vol. 2. Translated by Thomas, Keith; Magowan, Rachel. London: Conway Maritime Press. ISBN 0-85177-593-4.
- Kemp, Paul (1999). U-Boats Destroyed - German Submarine Losses in the World Wars. London: Arms & Armour. ISBN 1-85409-515-3.
- Bishop, Chris (2006). Kriegsmarine U-Boats, 1939-45. London: Amber Books. ISBN 978-1-904687-96-2.
