= HMS Fame (H78) =

British F-class destroyer

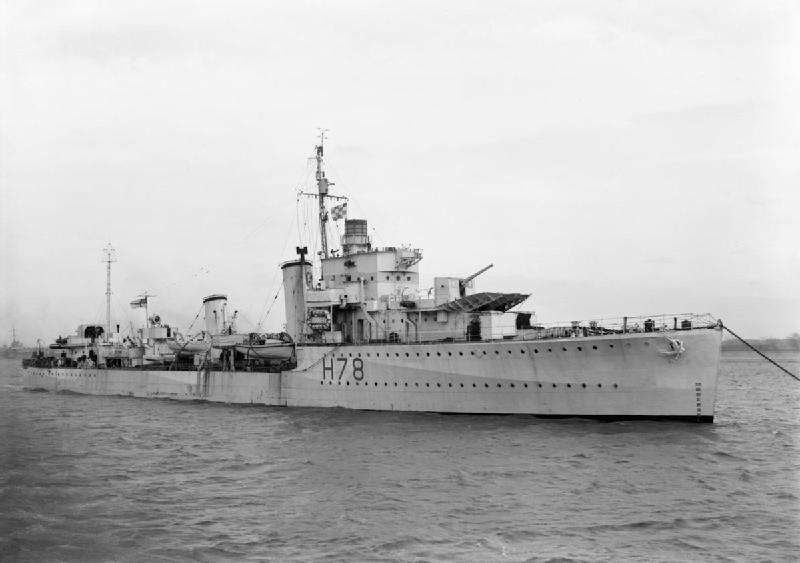
- Fame at anchor, September 1942

History

United Kingdom
- Name: Fame
- Ordered: 17 March 1933
- Builder: Parsons Marine Steam Turbine Company
- Laid down: 5 July 1933
- Launched: 28 June 1934
- Completed: 26 April 1935
- Fate: Sold to the Dominican Republic, 4 February 1949

Dominican Republic
- Name: Generalisimo
- Namesake: Generalissimo
- Acquired: 4 February 1949
- Renamed: Sanchez, 1962
- Fate: Scrapped, 1968

General characteristics (as built)
- Class & type: F-class destroyer
- Displacement: 1,405 long tons (1,428 t) (standard)
- Length: 329 ft (100.3 m) o/a
- Beam: 33 ft 3 in (10.13 m)
- Draught: 12 ft 6 in (3.81 m) (deep)
- Installed power: 3 × Admiralty 3-drum boilers; 36,000 shaft horsepower (27,000 kW)
- Propulsion: 2 × shafts; 2 × geared steam turbines
- Speed: 35.5 knots (65.7 km/h; 40.9 mph)
- Range: 6,350 nmi (11,760 km; 7,310 mi) at 15 knots (28 km/h; 17 mph)
- Complement: 145
- Sensors & processing systems: ASDIC
- Armament: 4 × single 4.7 in (120 mm) guns; 2 × quadruple 0.5 in (12.7 mm) machine guns; 2 × quadruple 21 in (533 mm) torpedo tubes; 20 × depth charges, 1 rack and 2 throwers

HMS Fame was an F-class destroyer built for the Royal Navy during the 1930s. Although assigned to the Home Fleet upon completion, the ship was attached to the Mediterranean Fleet in 1935–36 during the Abyssinia Crisis. During the Spanish Civil War of 1936–1939, she spent time in Spanish waters, enforcing the arms blockade imposed by Britain and France on both sides of the conflict. Fame served in the Norwegian Campaign in 1940 before she was severely damaged when she ran aground in October. The ship was refloated several months later and spent a year and a half under repair. Fame was converted into an escort destroyer while under repair and was assigned to escort duties in the North Atlantic when the repairs were completed in mid-1942.

She sank two German submarines before she was transferred back to British coastal waters in May 1944 to protect the build-up for Operation Overlord. Together with two other destroyers, she sank another German submarine that month and was reassigned to escort duties off the west coast of Scotland in July, where she remained until the war ended in May 1945. Fame remained on active duty until mid-1947 when she was paid off. The ship was recommissioned a year later and was then sold to the Dominican Republic in 1949. She was scrapped in 1968.

== Description ==
The F-class ships were repeats of the preceding E class. They displaced 1,405 long tons (1,428 t) at standard load and 1,940 long tons (1,970 t) at deep load. The ships had an overall length of 329 feet (100.3 m), a beam of 33 feet 3 inches (10.1 m) and a draught of 12 feet 6 inches (3.8 m). They were powered by two Parsons geared steam turbines, each driving one propeller shaft, using steam provided by three Admiralty three-drum boilers. The turbines developed a total of 36,000 shaft horsepower (27,000 kW) and gave a maximum speed of 35.5 knots (65.7 km/h; 40.9 mph). Fame carried a maximum of 470 long tons (480 t) of fuel oil that gave her a range of 6,350 nautical miles (11,760 km; 7,310 mi) at 15 knots (28 km/h; 17 mph). The ships' complement was 145 officers and ratings.

The ships mounted four 4.7-inch (120 mm) Mark IX guns in single mounts, designated 'A', 'B', 'X', and 'Y' from front to rear. For anti-aircraft (AA) defence, they had two quadruple Mark I mounts for the 0.5 inch Vickers Mark III machine gun. The F class was fitted with two above-water quadruple torpedo tube mounts for 21-inch (533 mm) torpedoes. One depth charge rack and two throwers were fitted; 20 depth charges were originally carried, but this increased to 38 shortly after the war began.

=== Wartime modifications ===
Fame had her rear torpedo tubes replaced by a 12-pounder AA gun while under repair in mid-1940. After running aground in October, she was converted into an escort destroyer. 'A' gun was replaced by a Hedgehog anti-submarine spigot mortar and stowage for a total of 70 depth charges meant that 'Y' gun had to be removed to compensate for the weight. A Type 286 short-range surface search radar was fitted and a Type 271 target indication radar was installed above the bridge, replacing the director-control tower and rangefinder. The ship also received a HF/DF radio direction finder mounted on a pole mainmast. Her short-range AA armament was augmented by two 20 mm (0.8 in) Oerlikon guns on the wings of the ship's bridge and another pair were added on the quarterdeck. By June 1943, the .50-calibre machine guns had been replaced by a pair of Oerlikons, 'A' gun was reinstalled, and the Hedgehog mounted there was converted to a split installation. Later, her single mounts on the bridge wings were probably replaced by twin mounts.

== Construction and career ==
Fame was ordered on 17 March 1933 from Parsons Marine Steam Turbine Company, although her hull was sub-contracted to Vickers Armstrongs. She was laid down at their Barrow shipyard on 5 July, launched on 28 June 1934, the same day as her sister ship, HMS Firedrake, and completed on 26 April 1935. The ship cost 244,216 pounds, excluding government-furnished equipment like the armament. Fame was initially assigned to the 6th Destroyer Flotilla (DF) of the Home Fleet, although she had to have her ammunition hoists modified at Devonport Royal Dockyard from 23 July to 28 August. The ship was then sent to reinforce the Mediterranean Fleet during the Second Italo-Abyssinian War. Fame was refitted at Devonport from 20 July to 10 November 1936 before she began to enforce the arms embargo imposed on both sides in the Spanish Civil War by the Non-Intervention Committee until January 1937. She visited Aarhus, Denmark in July before returning to Spanish waters in August–September. The ship then returned home and spent the next two years with the 6th DF. The 6th DF was renumbered the 8th Destroyer Flotilla in April 1939, five months before the start of World War II. Fame remained assigned to it until July 1940, escorting the larger ships of the fleet.

In the Norwegian Campaign, she supported the Allied landings on 12–13 May at Bjerkvik during the Battle of Narvik. She continued to provide fire support during the battle for the rest of the month. During the nights of 30 and 31 May, the ship helped to evacuate troops from Bodø to Harstad and Borkenes to await further evacuation. Fame was one of the ships that escorted the troop ships evacuating the troops from the Narvik area on 7 and 8 June.

While searching for the damaged submarine Shark on 6 July, she was badly damaged by bomb splinters and was under repair until 10 October. A week later, she ran aground, together with the destroyer Ashanti, off Whitburn on the County Durham coast while escorting the battleship King George V. The ship was severely damaged and could not be refloated until 1 December. Fame received temporary repairs at Sunderland before she was towed to Chatham Royal Dockyard on 2 February 1941. Heavily overworked, the dockyard took nearly 18 months to repair the ship, although the decision to convert her into an escort destroyer during this time contributed to the time required.

In September 1942, Fame finished her repairs and she was assigned to Escort Group B6 with her captain, Commander R. Heathcote, as the Group's senior officer. Her first Atlantic convoy action was with SC 104, a major convoy battle that saw the loss of 8 ships, with 2 warships damaged, and 2 U-boats destroyed, with 2 more damaged and forced to retire. Fame's ASDIC located German submarine U-353 on 16 October and a shallow-set pattern of 10 depth charges forced her to the surface where she was rammed and sunk by Fame. The impact badly damaged the destroyer and she was forced to leave the convoy for repairs after rescuing 39 survivors. Her repairs were completed in December, and, while escorting Convoy ON 155, was dispatched to the aid of Convoy ON 154, which was under heavy attack. Heathcote was ordered to take command of the escort after the commander of Escort Group C1 collapsed from exhaustion after a five-day battle, during which ON 154 had lost 14 ships for one U-boat destroyed.

In February 1943, Escort Group B6 was escorting Convoy ONS 165, which lost two ships for two U-boats destroyed. Fame sank one of these, U-69, on 17 February. Fame was reassigned to patrol duty in the South-Western Approaches in May 1944 as part of the Normandy landings and became the senior ship of the 14th Escort Group. During this time, Fame participated in the sinking of U-767, together with the destroyers Inconstant and Havelock on 18 June. The following month, Fame was transferred to the west coast of Scotland, continuing there until the end of the war.

=== Post war ===
Fame began a refit at Leith in May 1945 that lasted until August. Unlike most of the prewar destroyers, she remained on active duty and was assigned to the Rosyth Escort Force until October when she was transferred to the Londonderry Training Flotilla. A month later, Fame became the senior officer's ship for the 3rd Flotilla at Londonderry Port. The ship was reduced to reserve in May 1947, but was reactivated a year later and refitted in June 1948. Together with the destroyer Hotspur, she was sold on 4 February 1949 to the Dominican Republic for £190,000 for both ships, plus an additional £40,000 to refit each ship. By this time the ship carried a Type 291 air-warning radar and an American SG-1 surface-search radar. She was armed with three 4.7-inch guns, four 40-millimetre (1.6 in) Bofors light AA guns, one quadruple 21-inch torpedo mount, four depth charge throwers and two rails for 70 depth charges. Fame was renamed Generalisimo, but, after the death of Rafael Trujillo, the ship was renamed Sanchez in 1962. The ship was scrapped in 1968.
