= HMS Fearless (H67) =

F-class destroyer built for the Royal Navy during the 1930s

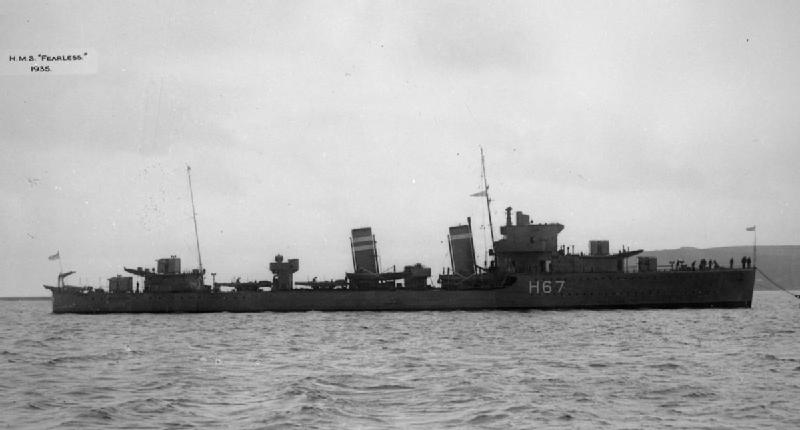
- HMS Fearless in 1935

History

United Kingdom
- Name: Fearless
- Ordered: 17 March 1933
- Builder: Cammell Laird, Birkenhead
- Laid down: 17 July 1933
- Launched: 12 May 1934
- Completed: 19 December 1934
- Identification: Pennant number: H67
- Fate: Torpedoed by Italian aircraft and scuttled, 23 July 1941

General characteristics (as built)
- Class & type: F-class destroyer
- Displacement: 1,405 long tons (1,428 t) (standard)
- Length: 329 ft (100.3 m) o/a
- Beam: 33 ft 3 in (10.13 m)
- Draught: 12 ft 6 in (3.81 m) (deep)
- Installed power: 3 × Admiralty 3-drum boilers; 36,000 shaft horsepower (27,000 kW)
- Propulsion: 2 × shafts; 2 × geared steam turbines
- Speed: 35.5 knots (65.7 km/h; 40.9 mph)
- Range: 6,350 nmi (11,760 km; 7,310 mi) at 15 knots (28 km/h; 17 mph)
- Complement: 145
- Sensors & processing systems: ASDIC
- Armament: 4 × single 4.7 in (120 mm) guns; 2 × quadruple 0.5 in (12.7 mm) machine guns; 2 × quadruple 21 in (533 mm) torpedo tubes; 20 × depth charges, 1 rack and 2 throwers

Service record
- Part of: Home Fleet, 1939–1940; Force H, 1940–1941
- Operations: Norwegian Campaign; Attack on Mers-el-Kébir; Malta Convoys
- Victories: U-27; U-49; U-138

HMS Fearless was an F-class destroyer built for the Royal Navy during the 1930s. Although assigned to the Home Fleet upon completion, the ship was attached to the Mediterranean Fleet in 1935–36 during the Abyssinia Crisis. During the Spanish Civil War of 1936–1939, she spent time in Spanish waters, enforcing the arms blockade imposed by Britain and France on both sides of the conflict. Several months after the start of the war in September 1939, Fearless helped to sink one submarine and sank another one in 1940 during the Norwegian Campaign. She was sent to Gibraltar in mid-1940 and formed part of Force H where she participated in the attack on the Vichy French ships at Mers-el-Kébir and the bombardment of Genoa. Fearless helped to sink one final submarine in 1941 and escorted many Malta convoys in the Mediterranean before she was torpedoed by an Italian bomber and had to be scuttled on 23 July 1941.

== Description ==
The F-class ships were repeats of the preceding E-class. They displaced 1,405 long tons (1,428 t) at standard load and 1,940 long tons (1,970 t) at deep load. The ships had an overall length of 329 feet (100.3 m), a beam of 33 feet 3 inches (10.1 m) and a draught of 12 feet 6 inches (3.8 m). They were powered by two Parsons geared steam turbines, each driving one propeller shaft, using steam provided by three Admiralty three-drum boilers. The turbines developed a total of 36,000 shaft horsepower (27,000 kW) and gave a maximum speed of 35.5 knots (65.7 km/h; 40.9 mph). Fearless carried a maximum of 470 long tons (480 t) of fuel oil that gave her a range of 6,350 nautical miles (11,760 km; 7,310 mi) at 15 knots (28 km/h; 17 mph). The ships' complement was 145 officers and ratings.

The ships mounted four 4.7-inch (120 mm) Mark IX guns in single mounts, designated 'A', 'B', 'X', and 'Y' in sequence from front to rear. For anti-aircraft (AA) defence, they had two quadruple Mark I mounts for the 0.5 inch Vickers Mark III machine gun. The F class was fitted with two above-water quadruple torpedo tube mounts for 21-inch (533 mm) torpedoes. One depth charge rack and two throwers were fitted; 20 depth charges were originally carried, but this increased to 38 shortly after the war began. All of her sister ships had their rear torpedo tubes replaced by a 12-pounder AA gun by April 1941, but she still had both sets of torpedo tube by that date and was probably not rearmed before her loss a few months later.

== Construction and career ==
Fearless was ordered on 17 March 1933 from Cammell Laird and was laid down at their Birkenhead shipyard on 17 July, launched on 12 May 1934, and completed on 19 December 1934. The ship cost 245,728 pounds, excluding government-furnished equipment like the armament. Fearless was initially assigned to the 6th Destroyer Flotilla (DF) of the Home Fleet, but she was detached to reinforce the Mediterranean Fleet during the Second Italo-Abyssinian War from March to July 1936. The ship enforced the arms embargo imposed on both sides in the Spanish Civil War by the Non-Intervention Committee from November 1936 to March 1937. During this time, Fearless escorted the elderly liner SS Habana, full of refugee children, from the Basque Country to Saint-Jean-de-Luz, France. She returned to Gibraltar for three-month detachments in August 1937, January 1938 and January 1939. The 6th DF was renumbered the 8th Destroyer Flotilla in April 1939, five months before the outbreak of World War II. Fearless remained assigned to it until May 1940, escorting the larger ships of the fleet.

After a pair of fishing trawlers were sunk by a submarine off the Hebrides after the start of World War II in September 1939, the 6th and 8th DFs were ordered to sweep the area on 19 September. The following day, Fearless and three of her sister ships sank the German submarine U-27 and then resumed their normal escort duties. At the end of March 1940, Fearless and the destroyer Hostile were assigned to screen the light cruiser Birmingham as she searched for German fishing ships off the Norwegian coast. Birmingham and her consorts were ordered to join the covering force for Operation Wilfred, an operation to lay mines in the Vestfjord to prevent the transport of Swedish iron ore from Narvik to Germany, on the evening of 7 April, but they were delayed by the need to transfer prize crews to several captured trawlers and head seas.

A week later, she was escorting the battleship Valiant which was covering Convoy NP1, the first troop convoy to Norway, as the Allies began to execute Plan R 4 after the German invasion on 9 April. The convoy entered the Andfjorden on the morning of 15 April en route to make their landings at Harstad, but paused there after reports of a German submarine on the surface inside the Vågsfjorden were received. Fearless, the destroyer Brazen, and the trawler Amethyst were ordered into the Vågsfjorden to investigate. Fearless's ASDIC found a submarine and the ship dropped five depth charges near U-49. The submarine commander, Lieutenant (Kapitänleutnant) Curt von Gossler, panicked and ordered his crew to surface and scuttle the boat. Machinegun fire from Fearless discouraged von Gossler from properly disposing of his secret documents and a boat from Brazen was able to retrieve many of them, including a map showing the location of all U-boats in Norwegian waters. Valiant, Fearless, Brazen and the destroyer Griffin were ordered to return to Scapa Flow that evening.

Beginning on 23 April, the ship was one of the escorts for the aircraft carriers Ark Royal and Glorious as they conducted air operations off the coast of Norway in support of Allied operations ashore. Fearless was detached to refuel at Sullom Voe on the 28th and rejoined the screen two days later. The ship was under repair from 15 May to 10 June at Middlesbrough. A week later, she was escorting the battlecruiser Hood and Ark Royal, together with her sisters Faulknor and Foxhound and the destroyer Escapade, from Scapa Flow to Gibraltar where they would form Force H.

=== Force H, 1940–41 ===
On 3 July she took part in the attack on the French Fleet at Mers-el-Kébir (Operation Catapult). A month later the ship escorted Force H during Operation Hurry, a mission to fly off fighter aircraft for Malta and conduct an airstrike on Cagliari on 2 August. Two days later, while returning to the UK, Fearless collided with the trawler Flying Wing and was repaired at the Barclay Curle shipyard in Scotstoun between 10 August and 11 October. On 30 October she was involved in another collision with SS Lanark at Greenock that fractured her stern. More repairs followed at Troon, and Fearless did not rejoin Force H at Gibraltar until 18 January 1941.

On 31 January, Force H departed Gibraltar to carry out Operation Picket, an unsuccessful night torpedo attack by eight of Ark Royal's Fairey Swordfish on the Tirso Dam in Sardinia. The British ships returned to Gibraltar on 4 February and began preparing for Operation Grog, a naval bombardment of Genoa, that was successfully carried out five days later. At the end of March, together with the light cruiser HMS Sheffield and three other destroyers, the ship attempted to intercept a Vichy French convoy that included the freighter SS Bangkok, supposedly laden with 3,000 metric tons (2,953 long tons; 3,307 short tons) of rubber, which had already been unloaded. Fearless was ordered to board and capture Bangkok, but she was thwarted by gunfire from a coast-defence battery off the port of Nemours, Algeria. A few days later, Fearless and four other destroyers escorted Sheffield, the battlecruiser Renown, and Ark Royal in Operation Winch, which delivered 12 Hurricane fighters to Malta.

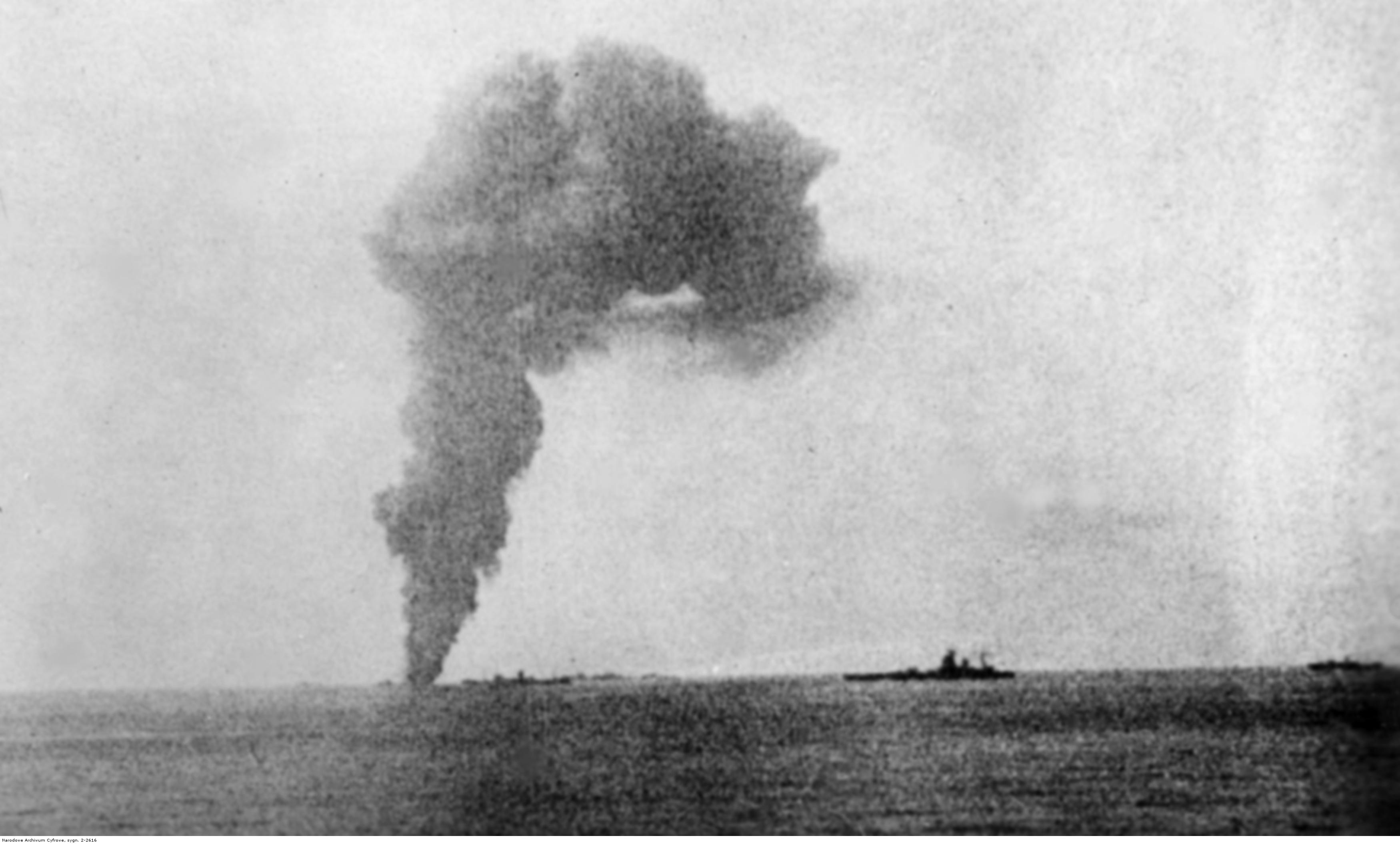
Presumably the burning Fearless, 23 July 1941

In early May she was part of the destroyer screen with five other destroyers for the battleship Queen Elizabeth, and the light cruisers Naiad, Fiji and Gloucester which were joining the Mediterranean Fleet. This was part of Operation Tiger which included a supply convoy taking tanks to the Middle East and the transfer of warships. Fearless and her sisters had their Two-Speed Destroyer Sweep (TSDS) minesweeping gear rigged to allow them to serve as a fast minesweepers en route to Malta. Despite this, one merchant ship was sunk by mines and another damaged. The ship escorted another flying-off mission to Malta on 14 June; two days later, after German blockade runners reached France, Force H sortied into the Atlantic on a failed search for more blockade runners. Together with her sisters Faulknor, Foresight, Forester and Foxhound, Fearless helped to sink U-138 on 18 June. Four days later, the 8th DF was tasked to intercept a German supply ship spotted heading towards the French coast. The next day they intercepted MV Alstertor which was scuttled by her crew upon the approach of the British ships. They rescued 78 British POWs taken from ships sunk by German raiders as well as the crew.

Another Malta convoy (Operation Substance) was conducted in mid-July, heavily escorted by Force H and elements of the Home Fleet. Fearless was torpedoed by an Italian Savoia-Marchetti SM.79 bomber at 09:45 on 23 July. The detonation killed 27 and wounded 11 of her crew, set the aft oil tank on fire, and knocked out all power and the port propeller shaft. Forester closed to render assistance, but Fearless could not be saved under the circumstances. Her crew were taken off by her sister, which then sank the wrecked and burning ship with torpedoes at 10:57, about 50 nmi (93 km; 58 mi) north-north-east of Bône, Algeria, in position 37°40′N 08°20′E.
