= HMS Brazen (H80) =

British B-class destroyer

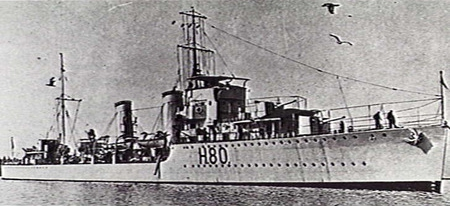
- HMS Brazen

History

United Kingdom
- Name: HMS Brazen
- Ordered: 22 March 1929
- Builder: Palmers, Hebburn
- Laid down: 22 July 1929
- Launched: 25 July 1930
- Completed: 8 April 1931
- Identification: Pennant number: H80
- Fate: Sunk by German aircraft, 20 July 1940

General characteristics (as built)
- Class & type: B-class destroyer
- Displacement: 1,360 long tons (1,380 t) (standard)
- Length: 323 ft (98.5 m) (o/a)
- Beam: 32 ft 3 in (9.8 m)
- Draught: 12 ft 3 in (3.7 m)
- Installed power: 3 × Admiralty 3-drum boilers; 34,000 shp (25,000 kW)
- Propulsion: 2 × shafts; 2 × geared steam turbines
- Speed: 35 knots (65 km/h; 40 mph)
- Range: 4,800 nmi (8,900 km; 5,500 mi) at 15 knots (28 km/h; 17 mph)
- Complement: 142 (wartime)
- Sensors & processing systems: Type 119 ASDIC
- Armament: 4 × single 4.7 in (120 mm) guns; 2 × single 2 pdr (40 mm (1.6 in)) AA guns; 2 × quadruple 21 in (533 mm) torpedo tubes; 1 × depth charge rail and 2 throwers; 20 × depth charges

HMS Brazen was a B-class destroyer built for the Royal Navy around 1930. Initially assigned to the Mediterranean Fleet, she was transferred to Home Fleet in 1936. The ship escorted convoys and conducted anti-submarine patrols early in World War II before participating in the Norwegian Campaign in April–May 1940. Brazen later began escorting coastal convoys in the English Channel and was sunk in late July 1940 by German aircraft whilst doing so.

== Description ==
Brazen displaced 1,360 long tons (1,380 t) at standard load and 1,790 long tons (1,820 t) at deep load. The ship had an overall length of 323 feet (98.5 m), a beam of 32 feet 3 inches (9.8 m) and a draught of 12 feet 3 inches (3.7 m). She was powered by Parsons geared steam turbines, driving two shafts, which developed a total of 34,000 shaft horsepower (25,000 kW) and gave a maximum speed of 35 knots (65 km/h; 40 mph). Steam for the turbines was provided by three Admiralty 3-drum boilers. Brazen carried a maximum of 390 long tons (400 t) of fuel oil that gave her a range of 4,800 nautical miles (8,900 km; 5,500 mi) at 15 knots (28 km/h; 17 mph). The ship's complement was 134 officers and ratings, although it increased to 142 during wartime.

The ship mounted four 45-calibre QF 4.7-inch Mk IX guns in single mounts. For anti-aircraft (AA) defence, Brazen had two 40-millimetre (1.6 in) QF 2-pounder Mk II AA guns mounted on a platform between her funnels. She was fitted with two above-water quadruple torpedo tube mounts for 21-inch (533 mm) torpedoes. One depth charge rail and two throwers were fitted; 20 depth charges were originally carried, but this increased to 35 shortly after the war began.

== Career ==
The ship was ordered on 22 March 1929 from Palmers Shipbuilding and Iron Company at Hebburn under the 1928 Naval Programme. She was laid down on 22 July 1929, and launched on 25 July 1930, as the seventh RN ship to carry this name. Brazen was completed on 8 April 1931 at a cost of £220,342, excluding items supplied by the Admiralty such as guns, ammunition and communications equipment. After her commissioning, she was assigned to the 4th Destroyer Flotilla with the Mediterranean Fleet until the end of 1935. The ship received a refit at Devonport from August to October 1933 and another at Malta a few months later. Brazen was assigned to the Home Fleet in 1936 and participated in the effort to rescue the crew of the submarine Thetis which had sunk during sea trials on 1 June 1939.

The ship was reassigned to the 19th Destroyer Flotilla in August, shortly before World War II began. She spent the next seven months escorting convoys and patrolling in the English Channel and the North Sea. On 13 October, Brazen rescued three survivors from German submarine U-40 which had sunk after striking a mine a few hours earlier. The ship, together with the destroyer Encounter, assumed the escort of Convoy HN12 after the destroyer Daring had been sunk by U-23. Later that day she rescued some survivors from the Norwegian merchant ship Sangstad. Brazen escorted the capital ships of the Home Fleet as they sortied into the North Sea on 7 April and continued that duty for the next several weeks. The ship was detached to escort a troop convoy to Namsos on 13 April and sank U-49 two days later with the destroyer Fearless near Harstad, Norway. The two destroyers rescued 41 of the submarine's crew. Brazen escorted several more convoys to and from Norway over the next several weeks.

On 30 May, the ship was en route to Harwich when she struck some submerged wreckage and suffered damage that required five weeks to repair. Brazen was transferred to the 1st Destroyer Flotilla, based at Dover, upon their completion, where she began escorting coastal convoys. Whilst escorting Convoy CW7 on 20 July, during the initial phase of the Battle of Britain, the ship was attacked by German Junkers Ju 87 Stuka dive bombers belonging to II./Sturzkampfgeschwader 1 (Dive Bomber Wing 1—or StG 1). The shock effect from several near misses broke her keel and then she was hit in the engine room. Brazen sank at position 51°01′05″N 01°17′15″E at 20:40. Only one member of her crew was killed during the attack and her gunners claimed to have shot down three Ju 87s. German records confirm only two losses—both fell to defending British fighter aircraft.
