= SS Glenorchy =

Several merchant ships have been named SS Glenorchy including:

- SS Glenorchy (1871), originally Willem III, Dutch ocean liner, scrapped in 1903.
- SS Glenorchy (1902), originally named A. E. Stewart, a Canadian bulk freighter launched in 1900 and lost in 1924.
