= German submarine U-49 (1939) =

German World War II submarine

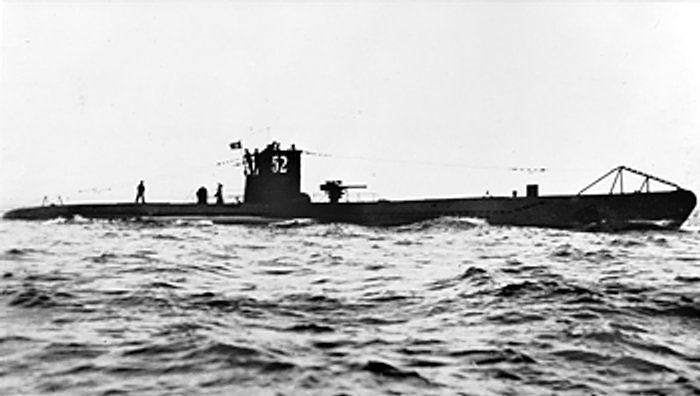
- U-52, a typical Type VIIB boat

History

Nazi Germany
- Name: U-49
- Ordered: 21 November 1936
- Builder: Germaniawerft, Kiel
- Cost: 4,439,000 Reichsmark
- Yard number: 584
- Laid down: 15 September 1938
- Launched: 24 June 1939
- Commissioned: 12 August 1939
- Fate: Sunk, 15 April 1940, near Narvik

General characteristics
- Class & type: Type VIIB U-boat
- Displacement: 753 t (741 long tons) surfaced; 857 t (843 long tons) submerged
- Length: 66.50 m (218 ft 2 in) o/a; 48.80 m (160 ft 1 in) pressure hull
- Beam: 6.20 m (20 ft 4 in) o/a; 4.70 m (15 ft 5 in) pressure hull
- Draught: 4.74 m (15 ft 7 in)
- Installed power: 2,800–3,200 PS (2,100–2,400 kW; 2,800–3,200 bhp) (diesels); 750 PS (550 kW; 740 shp) (electric)
- Propulsion: 2 shafts; 2 × diesel engines; 2 × electric motors
- Speed: 17.9 knots (33.2 km/h; 20.6 mph) surfaced; 8 knots (15 km/h; 9.2 mph) submerged
- Range: 8,700 nmi (16,112 km; 10,012 mi) at 10 knots (19 km/h; 12 mph)surfaced; 90 nmi (170 km; 100 mi) at 4 knots (7.4 km/h; 4.6 mph)
- Test depth: 230 m (750 ft); Calculated crush depth: 250–295 m (820–968 ft)
- Complement: 4 officers, 40–56 enlisted
- Sensors & processing systems: Gruppenhorchgerät
- Armament: 5 × 53.3 cm (21 in) torpedo tubes (four bow, one stern); 14 × torpedoes or 26 TMA mines; 1 × 8.8 cm (3.46 in) deck gun (220 rounds); 1 × 2 cm (0.79 in) C/30 anti-aircraft gun

Service record
- Part of: 7th U-boat Flotilla; 12 August 1939 – 15 April 1940
- Identification codes: M 06 383
- Commanders: Kptlt. Kurt von Goßler; 12 August 1939 – 15 April 1940
- Operations: 4 patrols: 1st patrol: 9 – 29 November 1939; 2nd patrol: 29 February – 5 March 1940; 3rd patrol: 11 – 29 March 1940; 4th patrol: 3 – 15 April 1940
- Victories: 1 merchant ship sunk (4,258 GRT)

German submarine U-49 was a Type VIIB U-boat of Nazi Germany's Kriegsmarine during World War II. She was ordered on 21 November 1936 and laid down on 15 September 1938 at the yards of Friedrich Krupp Germaniawerft AG in Kiel as yard number 584. Launched on 24 June 1939, she was commissioned on 12 August and assigned to the 7th U-Boat Flotilla under the command of Kurt von Goßler.

== Design ==
German Type VIIB submarines were preceded by the shorter Type VIIA submarines. U-49 had a displacement of 753 tonnes (741 long tons) when at the surface and 857 tonnes (843 long tons) while submerged. She had a total length of 66.50 m (218 ft 2 in), a pressure hull length of 48.80 m (160 ft 1 in), a beam of 6.20 m (20 ft 4 in), a height of 9.50 m (31 ft 2 in), and a draught of 4.74 m (15 ft 7 in). The submarine was powered by two Germaniawerft F46 four-stroke, six-cylinder supercharged diesel engines producing a total of 2,800 to 3,200 metric horsepower (2,060 to 2,350 kW; 2,760 to 3,160 shp) for use while surfaced, two BBC GG UB 720/8 double-acting electric motors producing a total of 750 metric horsepower (550 kW; 740 shp) for use while submerged. She had two shafts and two 1.23 m (4 ft) propellers. The boat was capable of operating at depths of up to 230 metres (750 ft).

The submarine had a maximum surface speed of 17.9 knots (33.2 km/h; 20.6 mph) and a maximum submerged speed of 8 knots (15 km/h; 9.2 mph). When submerged, the boat could operate for 90 nautical miles (170 km; 100 mi) at 4 knots (7.4 km/h; 4.6 mph); when surfaced, she could travel 8,700 nautical miles (16,100 km; 10,000 mi) at 10 knots (19 km/h; 12 mph). U-49 was fitted with five 53.3 cm (21 in) torpedo tubes (four fitted at the bow and one at the stern), fourteen torpedoes, one 8.8 cm (3.46 in) SK C/35 naval gun, 220 rounds, and one 2 cm (0.79 in) C/30 anti-aircraft gun. The boat had a complement of between forty-four and sixty.

== Service history ==
=== First patrol ===
Following training exercises, U-49 departed on her first active patrol on 9 November 1939. She was attacked by allied forces twice during this time. On 13 November she was bombed by British aircraft and forced down to 160 meters (520 feet), suffering minor damage. Three days later, she was located by the British destroyers HMS Echo and Wanderer and depth charged. The submarine was forced to dive to 170 metres (558 ft) to escape.

At 09:35 on 19 November U-49 came into contact with the 4,258 GRT British merchant ship SS Pensilva carrying a cargo of 6,985 tons of maize. A bow torpedo at 11:15 hours and a stern shot at 11.24 both missed their mark, but a third fired at 12:19 hit, and the ship sank slowly by the stern at position 46°51′N 11°36′W. The ship's master and crew were picked up by HMS Echo and later landed at Plymouth by HMS Wanderer.

=== Second patrol ===
U-49's second patrol began 29 February 1940 at Kiel and lasted only six days in the North Sea. No ships were attacked on this patrol, and she made port at Wilhelmshaven on 5 March 1940.

=== Third patrol ===
On 11 March 1940, U-49 departed Wilhelmshaven for the Norwegian coast, in 19 days at sea, no ships were attacked and the submarine returned to Wilhelmshaven on 29 March 1940.

=== Fourth patrol ===
3 April 1940 saw the beginning of U-49's fourth and final patrol. In 13 days off the Norwegian coast, no ships were attacked.

== Fate ==
On 15 April 1940, U-49 was sunk near Harstad, Norway in position 68°53′N 16°59′E by depth charges from the British destroyers HMS Fearless and Brazen. Of her crew of 42, one man died but there were 41 survivors.

== Wreck Site ==
The wreck of U-49 was found on 3 March 1993 by the Norwegian submarine Skolpen. She lies at a depth of 300 metres (980 ft).

== Summary of raiding history ==
Date	Name	Nationality	Tonnage (GRT)	Fate
19 November 1939	Pensilva	United Kingdom	4,258	Sunk

== Bibliography ==
- Busch, Rainer; Röll, Hans-Joachim (1999). German U-boat commanders of World War II: a biographical dictionary. Translated by Brooks, Geoffrey. London, Annapolis, Md: Greenhill Books, Naval Institute Press. ISBN 1-55750-186-6.
- Busch, Rainer; Röll, Hans-Joachim (1999). Deutsche U-Boot-Verluste von September 1939 bis Mai 1945 [German U-boat losses from September 1939 to May 1945]. Der U-Boot-Krieg (in German). Vol. IV. Hamburg, Berlin, Bonn: Mittler. ISBN 3-8132-0514-2.
- Gröner, Erich; Jung, Dieter; Maass, Martin (1991). U-boats and Mine Warfare Vessels. German Warships 1815–1945. Vol. 2. Translated by Thomas, Keith; Magowan, Rachel. London: Conway Maritime Press. ISBN 0-85177-593-4.
- Kemp, Paul (1997). U-Boats Destroyed - German Submarine Losses in the World Wars. p. 65. ISBN 1-85409-321-5.
