= HMS Acanthus =

British Flower-class corvette

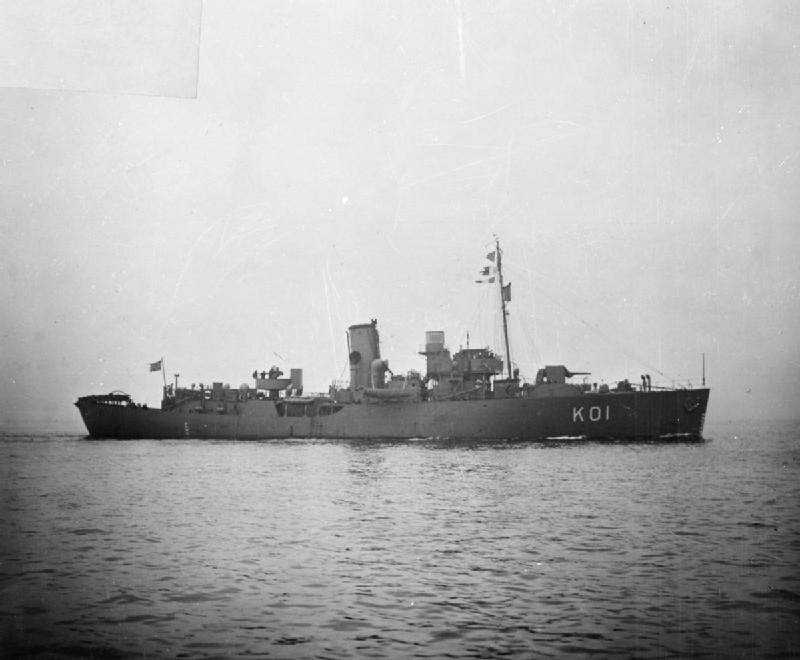
- Acanthus with a Norwegian flag

History

United Kingdom
- Name: HMS Acanthus
- Ordered: 21 September 1939
- Builder: Ailsa Shipbuilding Company
- Laid down: 21 December 1939
- Launched: 26 May 1941
- Identification: Pennant number: K01
- Fate: Sold to Royal Norwegian Navy, 1947

General characteristics
- Class & type: Flower-class corvette (original)
- Displacement: 925 long tons (940 t)
- Length: 205 ft (62.48 m)o/a
- Beam: 33 ft (10.06 m)
- Draught: 11.5 ft (3.51 m)
- Installed power: 2 × fire tube Scotch boilers; 2,750 ihp (2,050 kW)
- Propulsion: Single shaft; 1 × 4-cycle triple-expansion reciprocating steam engine
- Speed: 16 knots (29.6 km/h)
- Range: 3,500 nautical miles (6,482 km) at 12 knots (22.2 km/h)
- Complement: 85
- Sensors & processing systems: 1 × SW1C or 2C radar; 1 × Type 123A or Type 127DV sonar
- Armament: 1 × BL 4-inch (101.6 mm) Mk.IX single gun; 2 × .50 cal machine gun (twin); 2 × Lewis .303 cal machine gun (twin); 2 × Mk.II depth charge throwers; 2 × Depth charge rails with 40 depth charges

HMS Acanthus was a Flower-class corvette of the Royal Navy.

== Construction and design ==
Acanthus was one of ten Flower-class corvettes ordered on 21 September 1939, in the fourth of a series of orders. She was laid down at Ailsa Shipbuilding Company's Troon shipyard on 21 December 1939, was launched on 26 May 1941 and completed on 1 October 1941.

In 1942, the vessel was transferred to the Norwegian armed forces in exile and became the Norwegian ship HNoMS Andenes.

== Sources ==
- Friedman, Norman (2008). British Destroyers and Frigates: The Second World War and After. Barnsley, UK: Seaforth Publishing. ISBN 978-1-84832-015-4.
- Lambert, John; Brown, Les (2008). Flower-Class Corvettes. St. Catharines, Ontario, Canada: Vanwall Publishing. ISBN 978-1-55068-986-0.
- Rohwer, Jürgen; Hümmelchen, Gerhard (1992). Chronology of the War at Sea 1939–1945. London: Greenhill Books. ISBN 1-85367-117-7.
