= SS Japara =

A number of ships have carried the name Japara:

- SS Japara (1876), a 1,198-ton merchant vessel, operated by Koninklijke Paketvaart-Maatschappij.
- SS Japara (1930), a 3,323-ton merchant vessel, operated by Koninklijke Paketvaart-Maatschappij, sought refuge in Australia after fall of Java operating in Australia—New Guinea waters under charter to United States Army in the Southwest Pacific Area (SWPA), local fleet identification number X-18, 26 March 1942 to 8 May 1945.
- MS Japara (1938), a 9,312 GRT motor ship built 1938 for Rotterdamsche Lloyd serving through various charter agreements from 13 December 1941 to 1946 as a transport for United States Army on oceanic routes with activity in SWPA on occasion.

== Bibliography ==
- Maritime Administration. "Japara". Ship History Database Vessel Status Card. U.S. Department of Transportation, Maritime Administration.
- Masterson, Dr. James R. (1949). U. S. Army Transportation In The Southwest Pacific Area 1941-1947. Washington, D. C.: Transportation Unit, Historical Division, Special Staff, U. S. Army.
