= Convoy OB 318 =

Convoy during naval battles of the Second World War

- Part of Battle of the Atlantic
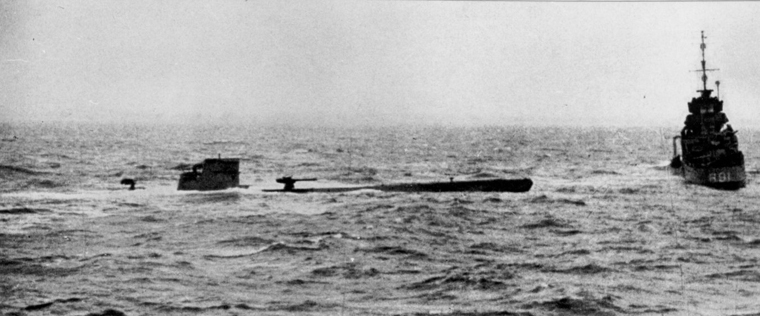
- U-110 and HMS Bulldog
Date	7–10 May 1941
Location	Atlantic Ocean, South of Iceland
Result	British victory

Belligerents
United Kingdom	(Nazi Germany) Germany

Commanders and leaders
Convoy Commodore: WB MacKenzie RNR; Escort: Cdr AJB Baker-Cresswell; Boarding Party: Sub-Lt. David Balme	Admiral Karl Dönitz

Strength
40 freighters 3 Destroyers; 3 Corvettes; 2 Naval trawlers	4 submarines

Casualties and losses
7 freighters sunk (35,315 GRT); 40 killed/drowned 2 freighters damaged	1 submarine captured 15 killed/drowned 32 captured 2 submarines damaged

OB 318 was a North Atlantic convoy which ran during the Battle of the Atlantic in World War II. During Operation Primrose Royal Navy convoy escorts HMS Bulldog, Broadway and Aubrietia captured U-110 with an intact Enigma machine and a wealth of signals intelligence, which led to the Allied breakthrough into cracking the German naval Enigma code.

== Prelude ==
By the spring of 1941 the battle of the Atlantic had started to increase German U-boat losses. This forced Vizeadmiral Karl Dönitz to change his strategy and he now moved his wolf packs further west, in order to catch the convoys without their anti-submarine escort. OB 318 was a west-bound convoy of 38 ships, either in ballast or carrying trade goods, and sailed from Liverpool on 2 May 1941 bound for ports in North America. The convoy commodore was R.Adm. WB MacKenzie in SS Colonial. It was escorted by 7 EG, an escort group led by HMS Westcott (Cdr. Bockett-Pugh) and comprising ten warships; these were joined in mid-ocean by 3 EG, a force of eight warships led by HMS Bulldog (Cdr J Baker-Cresswell). Opposing them was a force of nineteen U-boats, though in the event only six were in a position to pose a threat. One of those was U-110 under the command of Kapitänleutnant Fritz-Julius Lemp. Lemp notoriously had been in command of U-30 in 1939, which had controversially sunk the 13,581-ton passenger ship Athenia.

== Action ==
OB 318 was sighted on 7 May 1941 by U-94, which reported its position and commenced shadowing while U-boat Command (BdU) alerted other U-boats in the area. There were six U-boats within striking distance, and these were ordered to close with U-94's position. Meanwhile, during 7 May the escort force was joined by five ships from Iceland and the destroyers of 3 EG, which were to take over escort duties from the Western Approaches to a dispersal point at 34 West, a location south of Greenland. Three ships and the destroyers of 7 EG left for Iceland during 7 May, leaving the escort force still at ten warships.

=== U-94 ===
At nightfall on 7 May U-94 attacked the convoy, sinking two ships. Her skipper, Herbert Kuppisch, was able to enter the convoy by submerging ahead of the convoy and letting the lead escorts pass. He was then able to fire at close range on the ships in the centre of the convoy, hitting Ixion and Eastern Star. However U-94 was found by the sloop Rochester and counter-attacked by her, Bulldog and Amazon for four hours. U-94 was damaged and forced to retire, though she was able to effect repairs later and continue her patrol.

On 8 May the remaining vessels of 3 EG, three corvettes and two trawlers, with the armed merchant cruiser Ranpura in company, joined the convoy, and the remaining ships of 7 EG departed.

=== U-110 ===
On the evening of 8 May U-110 and U-201 also made contact, tracking the convoy until morning. In an unusual move, the two skippers made rendezvous in order to co-ordinate their attack; Lemp in U-110 would make a submerged attack from ahead, while Adalbert Schnee in U-201 would do the same from the rear. It was expected that the escort would have departed by this time, leaving the convoy vulnerable to their assault. During the morning of 9 May U-110 moved into position and commenced her attack. Lemp was surprised to encounter the escort still in place, but succeeded in penetrating the convoy, sinking two ships. Lemp was targeting a tanker with his fourth torpedo tube when Aubrietia spotted the periscope and then located U-110 with ASDIC. Aubrietia gave the alert to other ships while she unloaded and dropped a pattern of depth charges. U-110 performed a deep dive and managed to survive the initial onslaught. Aubrietia was joined by the destroyers Bulldog and Broadway, and the attack was delivered with such force that Lemp was forced to surface. As he came up a dozen men on U-110 rushed to man the guns but were shot by the waiting British ships. Lemp also saw that Bulldog was preparing to ram so Lemp gave the hurried order to abandon ship. Commander Joe Baker-Cresswell decided to try to capture the U-boat instead and hove to. The survivors went over the side including Lemp. It turned out that Lemp, realising that Bulldog was not going to ram had decided to go back and try to destroy the equipment along with the code books but he failed and died in the attempt. U-110 itself survived the attack, but was seriously damaged and was taking on water.

Bulldog soon had pulled alongside and Sub-Lieutenant David Balme led a boarding party, and began stripping her of what they could find. Balme's team soon began to take off the valuables, and these turned out to be codebooks, charts, ciphers and most significantly, a complete and undamaged Enigma machine. The crew hadn't any idea what it was they had captured. Before they transferred the equipment Bulldog had to depart, leaving the U-boat with the prize crew as it had received a message of another submarine in the area. Balme and his men were left on board U-110 for over an hour before Bulldog returned.

=== U-201 ===
Meanwhile, Schnee in U-201 made his attack, sinking one ship and damaging another. He was also counter-attacked, by Amazon, Nigella and St Apollo, and forced to retire. He was left damaged.

=== U-556 ===
In the early hours of 10 May OB 318 was found by U-556, which attacked immediately, resulting in one ship damaged. As OB 318 was at its dispersal point, the convoy separated during the night, while the escorts departed to meet their next charge. However U-556 was able to keep in touch with a group of ships heading south-west, and during the day sank two more.

== Aftermath and significance ==
U-boats sank five ships from convoy OB 318; and three, including the convoy commodore's ship Colonial, were sunk before arriving by U-boats patrolling near their destinations. Thirty-three ships arrived safely at their destinations over the next two weeks.

Baker-Cresswell took U-110 in tow, but she sank within hours due to the damage she had sustained. Lemp was lost with 14 members of his crew, but a war correspondent, 4 officers and 28 men were rescued and sent to Scapa Flow as prisoners of war. At Scapa Flow experts from Bletchley Park were waiting and were exceptionally surprised with what they collected and took back with them. The capture of the Enigma machine was highly secret at the time, and none of the crew knew of the significance. The machine itself significantly assisted the work in hand at Bletchley Park in breaking German naval codes. This was the first fully functioning machine and the first one used to break the naval codes along with the capture of codes from a number of German weather ships during the same year. Thanks to this Enigma machine, Bletchley were able to inform the Royal Navy and thus steered convoys away from where most groups of U-boat packs were present. The difference made was substantial; from when the information began to pour through in June 1941 Allied shipping losses were around 432,000 tons, but by August these had dropped to less than 80,000 tons.

The most important find as well being the Reservehandverfahren cipher, which was first solved at Bletchley Park in June 1941 by means of documents captured from U-110 and then later on with the important capture of code books and other important documents from U-559 on 30 October 1942. Thereafter it was solved using cryptanalysis led by Alan Turing for over three years. Some 1,400 signals were read during that period. Baker-Cresswell was awarded the DSO and promoted captain. King George VI told him the capture of the U-110 cipher material had been "the most important single event in the whole war at sea".

== Tables ==
=== Allied merchant ships ===
Name	Flag	Dead	Tonnage (GRT)	Cargo	Notes
Ixion (1912)	United Kingdom	0	10,263	2,900 tons General cargo	Sunk on 7 May by U-94
Eastern Star (1920)	Norway	0	5,658	General cargo incl. 16 aircraft	Sunk on 7 May by U-94
Bengore Head (1922)	United Kingdom	1	2,609	1,200 tons coal	Sunk on 9 May by U-110
Esmond (1930)	United Kingdom	0	4,976	In ballast	Sunk on 9 May by U-110
Gregalia (1929)	United Kingdom	0	5,802	In ballast	Sunk on 9 May by U-201
Empire Cloud (1941)	United Kingdom	0	5,969	In ballast	Damaged on 9 May by U-201. Arrived Greenock; repaired & re-entered service
Aelybryn (1938)	United Kingdom	9	4,986	General cargo	Damaged on 10 May by U-556 after convoy dispersed. Towed to Reykjavík by HMS Hollyhock (K64)
Empire Caribou (1919)	United Kingdom	34	4,861	2,020 tons of chalk	Sunk on 10 May by U-556 after convoy dispersed
Gand (1919)	Belgium	1	5,086	In ballast	Sunk on 10 May by U-556 after convoy dispersed
Berhala (1927)	Netherlands	3	6,622	General cargo, incl tinplates, locomotives & aircraft	Sunk by U-38 after convoy dispersed
Colonial (1926)	United Kingdom	0	5,108	General cargo	Sunk by U-107. Carried convoy commodore RADM W B MacKenzie
British Prince (1935)	United Kingdom		4,879		Carried Vice-Commodore Capt E Rees DSC RNR
Agioi Victores (1918)	Greece		4,344		
Athelsultan (1929)	United Kingdom		8,882		
Atlantic Coast (1934)	United Kingdom		890		
Baron Cawdor (1935)	United Kingdom		3,638		
Benlomond (1922)	United Kingdom		6,630		
Burma (1914)	United Kingdom		7,821		
Chaucer (1929)	United Kingdom		5,792		
City of Cairo (1915)	United Kingdom		8,034		
City of Kimberley (1925)	United Kingdom		6,169		
Edam (1923)	Netherlands		8,871		
El Mirlo (1930)	United Kingdom		8,092		
Gyda (1934)	United Kingdom		1,695		
Hercules (1914)	Netherlands		2,317		
Hoyanger (1926)	Norway		4,624		
Iron Baron (1911)	Norway		3,231		
King Edwin (1927)	United Kingdom		4,536		
Lima (1918)	Sweden		3,762		
Lucerna (1930)	United Kingdom		6,556		
Nagina (1921)	United Kingdom		6,551		
Nailsea Moor (1937)	United Kingdom		4,926		Destination Montreal
New York City (1917)	United Kingdom		2,710		
Orminster (1914)	United Kingdom		5,712		
Pontfield (1940)	United Kingdom		8,319		Belfast Lough
Sommerstad (1926)	Norway		5,923		
Tornus (1936)	United Kingdom		8,054		
Tureby (1936)	United Kingdom		4,372		
Zwarte Zee (1933)	Netherlands		793		
Borgfred (1920)	Norway		2,183		Sailed from Reykjavík with No.3 Escort Group on 6 May
Bradglen (1930)	United Kingdom		4,741		Sailed from Reykjavík with No.3 Escort Group on 6 May
Cardium (1931)	United Kingdom		8,236		Sailed from Reykjavík with No.3 Escort Group on 6 May
Gunvor Maersk (1931)	United Kingdom		1,977		Sailed from Reykjavík with No.3 Escort Group on 6 May

=== Convoy Escorts ===
Name	Type	Joined	Left	Notes
HMS Campbeltown	Town-class destroyer	2 May 1941	7 May 1941	7th EG
HMS Newmarket	Town-class destroyer	2 May 1941	7 May 1941	7th EG
HMT Angle	Naval trawler	2 May 1941	7 May 1941	7th EG
HMS Rochester	Shoreham-class sloop	2 May 1941	8 May 1941	7th EG
HMS Marigold	Flower-class corvette	2 May 1941	8 May 1941	7th EG
HMS Nasturtium	Flower-class corvette	2 May 1941	8 May 1941	7th EG
HMS Primrose	Flower-class corvette	2 May 1941	8 May 1941	7th EG
HMS Westcott	V and W-class destroyer	3 May 1941	8 May 1941	Cdr. Bockett-Pugh was senior officer of 7th EG
HMS Auricula	Flower-class corvette	3 May 1941	8 May 1941	7th EG
HMS Dianthus	Flower-class corvette	3 May 1941	8 May 1941	7th EG
HMS Ranpura	Armed merchant cruiser	7 May 1941	10 May 1941	
HMS Bulldog	B-class destroyer	7 May 1941	10 May 1941	Cdr J Baker-Cresswell was senior officer of 3rd EG
HMS Amazon	Destroyer prototype	7 May 1941	10 May 1941	3rd EG
HMS Broadway	Town-class destroyer	7 May 1941	10 May 1941	3rd EG
HMS Aubrietia	Flower-class corvette	7 May 1941	10 May 1941	3rd EG
HMS Hollyhock	Flower-class corvette	7 May 1941	10 May 1941	3rd EG
HMS Nigella	Flower-class corvette	7 May 1941	10 May 1941	3rd EG
HMT Daneman	Naval trawler	7 May 1941	10 May 1941	3rd EG
HMT St Apollo	Naval trawler	7 May 1941	10 May 1941	3rd EG

=== U-boats Hit ===
Date	Number	Type	Commander	Casualties	Hit by...
7/8 May 1941	U-94	VIIC	Kapitänleutnant Herbert Kuppisch	?	Damaged
9 May 1941	U-110	IXB	Kapitänleutnant Fritz-Julius Lemp	15	Aubrietia, Bulldog, Broadway
9 May 1941	U-201	VIIC	Korvettenkapitän Adalbert Schnee	?	Damaged

== U-571 (film) ==
The film U-571 was partially inspired by the capture of U-110. The film however caused irritation and anger in Britain whereby the film's plot was Americanised. The anger came to such a point that at Prime Minister's Questions, Tony Blair agreed with questioner Brian Jenkins MP that the film was "an affront" to British sailors. In response to a letter from Paul Truswell, MP for the Pudsey constituency (which includes Horsforth, a town proud of its connection with HMS Aubrietia), U.S. president Bill Clinton wrote assuring that the film's plot was only a work of fiction. Despite the criticisms however David Balme was interviewed by the director of the film, Jonathan Mostow in which he described the capture of U-110 and the capture itself was mentioned at the start of the end credits as recognition and response to the criticisms.

== See also ==
- Ultra (cryptography)
- Cryptanalysis of the Enigma
- Kurzsignale

== Sources ==
- Balme, David. OPERATION PRIMROSE: The Story of the Capture of the Enigma Cypher Machine from U11O Military History Journal Vol 9 No 3 - June 1993- The South African Military History Society
- Blair, Clay Hitler's U-Boat War The Hunters 1939-1942 (1996) Random House ISBN 0-394-58839-8
- Hague, Arnold : The Allied Convoy System 1939–1945 (2000). ISBN (Canada) 1 55125 033 0 . ISBN (UK) 1 86176 147 3
- Kemp, Paul (1997). U-Boats Destroyed, German submarine losses in the World Wars. Arms and Armour. ISBN 1-85409-515-3.
- Lenton, H.T. & Colledge, J.J. British and Dominion Warships of World War II Doubleday and Company (1968)
- Niestle, Axel (1998). German U-Boat Losses During World War II. Greenhill. ISBN 1-85367-352-8.
- Roskill, Stephen. The Secret Capture: U-110 and the Enigma Story. Naval Institute Press, ISBN 978-1-59114-810-4
- Roskill, Stephen : The War at Sea 1939–1945 Vol I (1954). ISBN (none)
- Sebag-Montefiore, Hugh. Enigma: The Battle for the Code W&N; First Edition, 2000. ISBN 978-0-297-84251-4
- van der Vat, Dan : The Atlantic Campaign (1988). ISBN 0-340-37751-8
