= U-571 (film) =

2000 film by Jonathan Mostow

- Theatrical release poster
- Directed by: Jonathan Mostow
- Screenplay by: Jonathan Mostow; Sam Montgomery; David Ayer
- Story by: Jonathan Mostow
- Produced by: Dino De Laurentiis; Martha De Laurentiis
- Starring: Matthew McConaughey; Bill Paxton; Harvey Keitel; Jon Bon Jovi; Jake Weber; Erik Palladino; Matthew Settle; David Keith; Thomas Kretschmann; Carsten Voigt
- Cinematography: Oliver Wood
- Edited by: Wayne Wahrman
- Music by: Richard Marvin
- Production companies: Dino De Laurentiis Company; Canal+ Image
- Distributed by: Universal Pictures (Select territories); BAC Films (France)
- Release date: April 21, 2000
- Running time: 116 minutes / 1hr & 56min
- Countries: United States; France
- Languages: English; German
- Budget: $62 million
- Box office: $127 million

U-571 is a 2000 submarine film directed by Jonathan Mostow from a screenplay he co-wrote with Sam Montgomery and David Ayer. The film stars Matthew McConaughey, Bill Paxton, Harvey Keitel, Jon Bon Jovi, Jake Weber and Matthew Settle. The film follows a World War II German U-boat boarded by American submariners to capture her Enigma cipher machine.

The film was a financial and critical success, grossing $127 million worldwide and receiving generally positive reviews from critics, but the fictitious plot was subject to substantial controversy and criticism for depicting the real-life actions of the British Royal Navy as instead being performed by the American Navy. The film also won the Academy Awards for Best Sound Editing.

== Plot ==
After an attack on a British merchant ship in May 1942, during the Battle of the Atlantic, German U-boat U-571 has her engines badly damaged by depth charges from a British destroyer. With all of her engineers and machinists killed in a flash fire, the sub's commander Kapitänleutnant Günther Wassner transmits a distress call.

Allied intelligence intercepts the distress message and US Navy submarine S-33 is modified to resemble a German resupply U-boat. Their crew is ordered to steal the Enigma machine coding device and sink the U-571. The executive officer of S-33, Lieutenant Tyler, is unhappy that a recommendation for command of his own submarine has been blocked by his commanding officer, Lieutenant Commander Dahlgren. The CO feels Tyler can't issue orders without hesitation, a crucial quality Dahlgren feels submarine captains need to have. The crew for the mission includes Lieutenant Hirsch from Naval Intelligence who is fluent in German, Radioman Wentz who is also fluent in German due to an undisclosed immigrant parent, and a Marine explosives expert named Coonan.

The S-33 arrives at U-571 during a storm, and sends a boarding party. When Hirsch hesitates to speak in German, Wentz is forced to initiate the conversation, after which the boarding party surprises and overwhelms the Germans. While securing U-571, the American S-33 is torpedoed by a German resupply submarine. Several members of the boarding party, including Coonan, are killed. Dahlgren, adrift and dying, orders Tyler to dive the captured U-boat with the survivors of the boarding party, including crewmen Mazzolla and Trigger. Tyler dives U-571 and destroys the resupply submarine in a torpedo duel.

The men find two survivors from the assault on the U-571: cook Eddie, and Wassner, who disguises himself as an electrician. After the boarding party makes repairs and gets the sub operating again, Tyler routes the disabled submarine toward Land's End. They are spotted by a German reconnaissance plane and Mazzola, dubious of Tyler's leadership, tries to convince the crew to defy Tyler's orders and fire on the plane. Tyler punches Mazzola.

When a German destroyer approaches the submarine, Wassner escapes captivity, sabotages the starboard motor and shoots Mazzola twice. The mortally wounded Mazzola helps Eddie subdue Wassner. The destroyer sends over a whaleboat to the still-surfaced submarine, which opens fire on the destroyer, damaging its radio and preventing it from reporting that the Allies have the Enigma machine. The submarine dives beneath the destroyer, which drops depth charges. Tyler ejects debris and Mazzola's corpse in an attempt to deceive the German ship they've been destroyed. U-571 descends to 200 metres (660 ft) where it is damaged by high water pressure and must execute an uncontrolled ascent to escape. Wassner is discovered signalling in Morse Code; Hirsch bludgeons him to death but the destroyer has already heard the signal. Tyler orders Trigger to submerge himself in the bilge underwater to repressurize the single remaining torpedo tube, planning to sink the destroyer when the submarine surfaces.

Trigger uses an air hose to breathe inside the flooded compartment and closes the main air valve to the stern tube, but finds a second leaking valve that is out of reach. U-571 surfaces, unable to launch her last torpedo. The pursuing destroyer attacks with her main guns and the hull collapses, pinning Trigger's legs beyond reach of the air hose. He closes the valve before he drowns and Tyler launches the torpedo. The destroyer is unable to evade it and is sunk. The heavily damaged U-571 is abandoned and sinks; the remaining crew is rescued, with the Enigma still in their possession, by a US Navy PBY Catalina flying boat.

== Cast ==
- Matthew McConaughey as Lieutenant Andrew Tyler
- Bill Paxton as Lieutenant Commander Mike Dahlgren
- Harvey Keitel as Chief Gunner's Mate Henry Keough
- Jon Bon Jovi as Lieutenant Pete Emmett
- David Keith as Major Matthew Coonan
- Jake Weber as Lieutenant Michael Hirsch
- Jack Noseworthy as Seaman Bill Wentz
- Tom Guiry as Seaman Ted "Trigger" Fitzgerald
- Will Estes as Torpedoman Ronald "Rabbit" Parker
- T. C. Carson as Seaman Eddie Carson
- Erik Palladino as Seaman Anthony Mazzola
- Dave Power as Motor Machinist Charles "Tank" Clemens
- Derk Cheetwood as Seaman Herb Griggs
- Matthew Settle as Ensign Keith Larson
- Thomas Kretschmann as Kapitänleutnant Günther Wassner
- Gunter Würger as Oberleutnant zur See Kohl
- Oliver Stokowski as Elektro-Obermaschinist Hans
- Burnell Tucker as Admiral Duke
- Paul McEvoy (uncredited) as German Captain

== Production ==
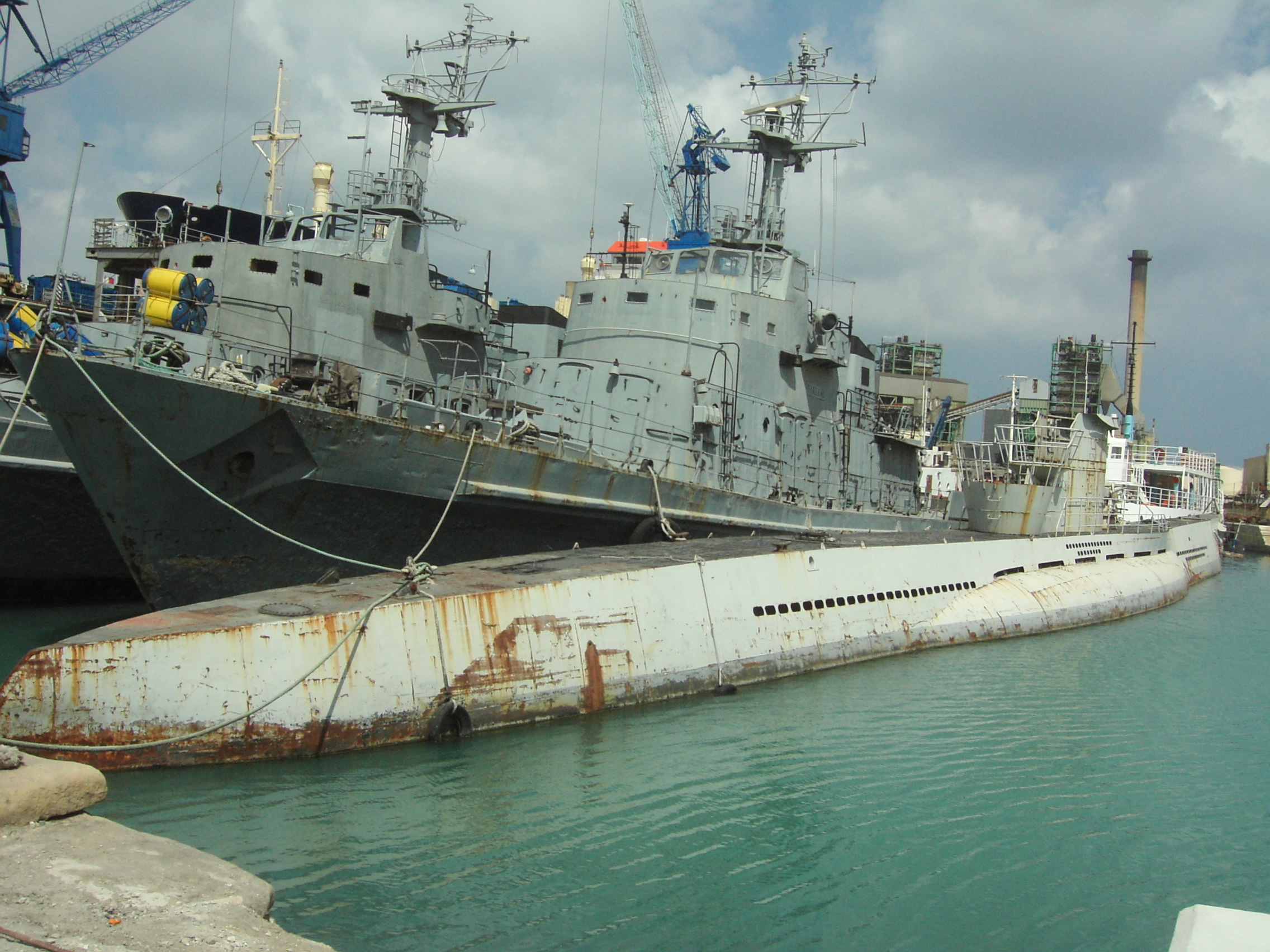
Replica of U-571 which was filmed in the movie

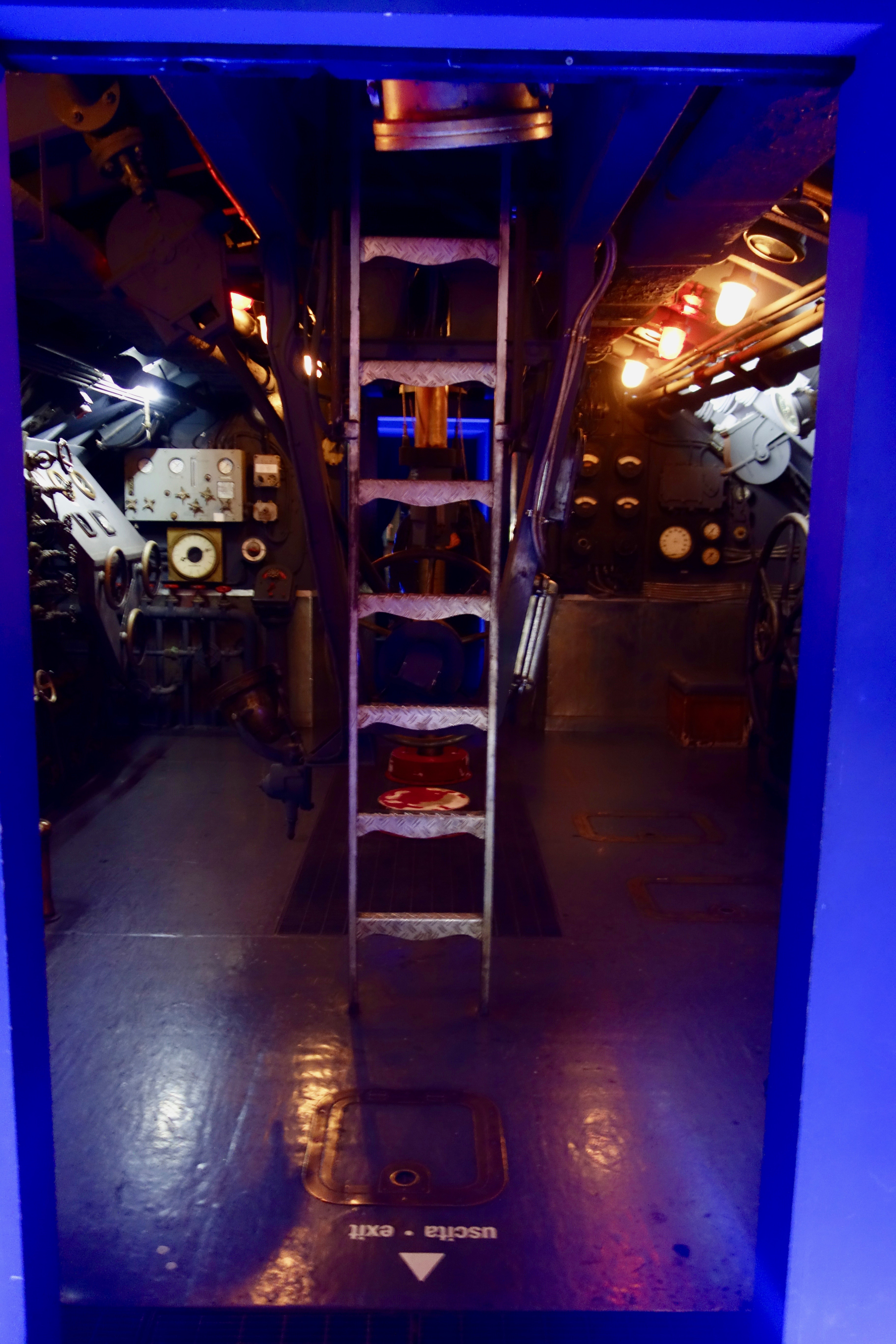
Submarine set at the Cinecittà studios in Rome, Italy

U-571 was filmed in the Mediterranean, near Rome and Malta. Shooting also took place at Cinecittà studios. Footage, sets and models from the movie have been reused for other productions, including Submerged, depicting the loss of USS Sailfish, and the fictional Ghostboat. A non-diving replica of the US submarine S-33 is located in Grand Harbour, Valletta. The replica would later be used in the TV adaption of Das Boot.

American Vice Admiral Patrick Hannifin, Royal Navy Lt. Commander David Balme and enigma encryption expert David Kahn served as advisors on the film, with the production also consulting with the Italian Navy. The crew searched worldwide through naval depots, scrapyards, and private collections for actual parts from German submarines. Captain Lance Julian, who previously worked on the film Titanic, served as the marine consultant.

In the US, the film was originally rated "R", because of a scene where Lt. Emmett is beheaded by flying debris. To get a "PG-13", the shot was redone with Emmett instead knocked overboard. A death scene was also filmed for Major Coonan, but the effect did not work well, so it was cut. This leaves the character vanishing during the explosion.

== Reception ==
=== Box office ===
The film performed well at the box office. It grossed $19 million at number one ahead of Love & Basketball, Rules of Engagement, 28 Days and Keeping the Faith during the opening weekend of April 21–23, 2000, the third-highest April opening weekend at the time, after The Matrix and Life. It remained number one in its second weekend with $12.2 million, beating out The Flintstones in Viva Rock Vegas, Frequency and Where the Heart Is. In its third week, Gladiator took over the number one spot, resulting the film to drop into second place and earn $7.7 million. The film eventually earned $77 million in North America and $127 million worldwide.

=== Critical reception ===
The film was generally well received by critics. On Rotten Tomatoes, the film holds a score of 68% based on 117 reviews, with an average rating of 6.3/10. The consensus reads: "Excellent cinematography and an interesting plot accompanied by a talented cast and crew make U-571 a tense thriller." Metacritic assigned the film a weighted average score of 62 out of 100, based on 35 critics. Audiences polled by CinemaScore gave it an average grade of "B+" on an A+-to-F scale.

However, Roger Ebert of the Chicago Sun-Times gave the film two out of four, writing, "U-571 is a clever wind-up toy of a movie, almost a trailer for a video game. Compared to Das Boot or The Hunt for Red October, it's thin soup. The characters are perfunctory, the action is recycled straight out of standard submarine formulas, and there is one shot where a man is supposed to be drowning and you can just about see he's standing on the bottom of the studio water tank." Reviewer George Perry gave the film two stars out of five, comparing it negatively with Das Boot, praising the acting but criticised the "cardboard characters", and "chaotic" action sequences. Reviewing the DVD release, myReviewer.com felt the cast to be underused and criticised the story. Philip Sledge felt the film to be entertaining. Ben Falk of BBC argued Mostow had at least attempted to be historically accurate by using Lt. Commander David Balme and enigma encryption expert David Kahn as advisors.

Alex von Tunzelmann of The Guardian ranked the film with a "C-" stating that the "only honest thing about "U-571 is its tagline: "Nine men are about to change history."

=== Awards and nominations ===
The film was nominated for two awards at the 73rd Academy Awards: Best Sound (Steve Maslow, Gregg Landaker, Rick Kline and Ivan Sharrock) and Best Sound Editing. It won the sound editing award, while losing the sound award to Gladiator.

== Historical inaccuracies ==
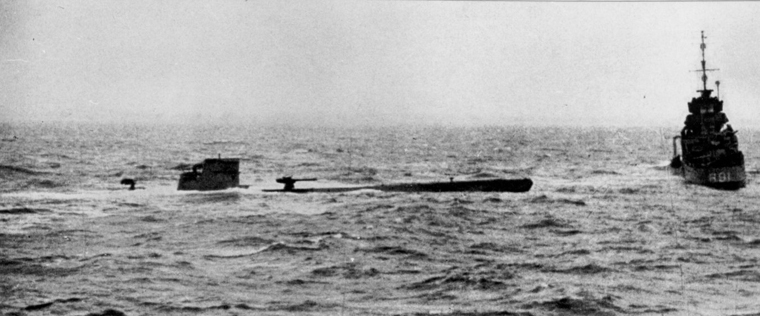
HMS Bulldog capturing U-110 and its Enigma machine, 9 May 1941

The film's story and characters are fictional. The film sparked controversy during its production and release. Anger over the film's inaccuracies reached the House of Commons. Labour MP Brian Jenkins used Prime Minister's Questions in June 2000 to state that the film was an "affront to the memories of the British sailors who lost their lives on this action." Prime Minister Tony Blair said, "I agree entirely with what you say... we hope that people realise these are people that, in many cases, sacrificed their lives in order that this country remained free." Paul Truswell, for the constituency of Pudsey, a town closely associated with HMS Aubrietia, wrote to the US president Bill Clinton, who acknowledged that the film's plot was only a work of fiction. The director of the local Horsforth Museum lamented the rewriting of history, saying: "You can't rewrite history and we have to pass on the facts to the younger generation through the schools." In 2009, the film was first on a list of "most historically inaccurate movies" in The Times.

Sub Lt. David Balme, the Royal Navy officer who led the boarding party on U-110, called U-571 "a great film" and that "young people will love it" and said that it would not have been financially viable without being "americanised". The film's producers did not agree to his request for a statement that it was a work of fiction, but the end credits dedicate the film to the "Allied sailors and officers who risked their lives capturing Enigma materials" during the Second World War. The credits acknowledge the Royal Navy's role in capturing Enigma machines and code documents from U-110, U-559 and the US Navy's capture of U-505.

Author Hugh Sebag argues that while the media may have made reports on the fact that the British made the most crucial captures, the Americans role was also unjustly downgraded, noting that they made an important part in breaking the Enigma code. However, in 2006 screenwriter David Ayer expressed regret over making U-571, stating that the film had distorted history, and said that he would not do it again. He told BBC Radio 4's The Film Programme that he "did not feel good" about suggesting that Americans, rather than the British, had captured the naval Enigma cipher: "It was a distortion...a mercenary decision...to create this parallel history in order to drive the film for an American audience. Both my grandparents were officers in the Second World War, and I would be personally offended if somebody distorted their achievements."

The first capture of a (five-cylinder) naval Enigma machine with its cipher keys from a U-boat, designation U-110, was made on 9 May 1941 by HMS Bulldog of the Royal Navy, commanded by Captain Joe Baker-Cresswell assisted by HMS Aubrietia and HMS Broadway, seven months before the United States entered the war. The United States's involvement in the European theatre of the Second World War did not commence until mid-1941 with Lend-Lease, and direct, open participation did not begin until the US Navy began engaging the Kriegsmarine in the fall of 1941, months before Pearl Harbor, by which time Enigma machines had already been captured and their codes broken in Europe.

In 1942, the Royal Navy also seized U-559, capturing additional Enigma codebooks. According to Britain's Channel 4, "the captured codebooks provided vital assistance to British cryptographers such as Alan Turing, at the code-breaking facility of Bletchley Park." The Allies captured Enigma-related codebooks and machines about fifteen times during the War. All but two of these by British forces, the exceptions being the Royal Canadian Navy capture of U-744 in March 1944, and the US Navy's seizure of U-505 in June 1944: by this time, the Allies were already routinely decoding German naval Enigma traffic.

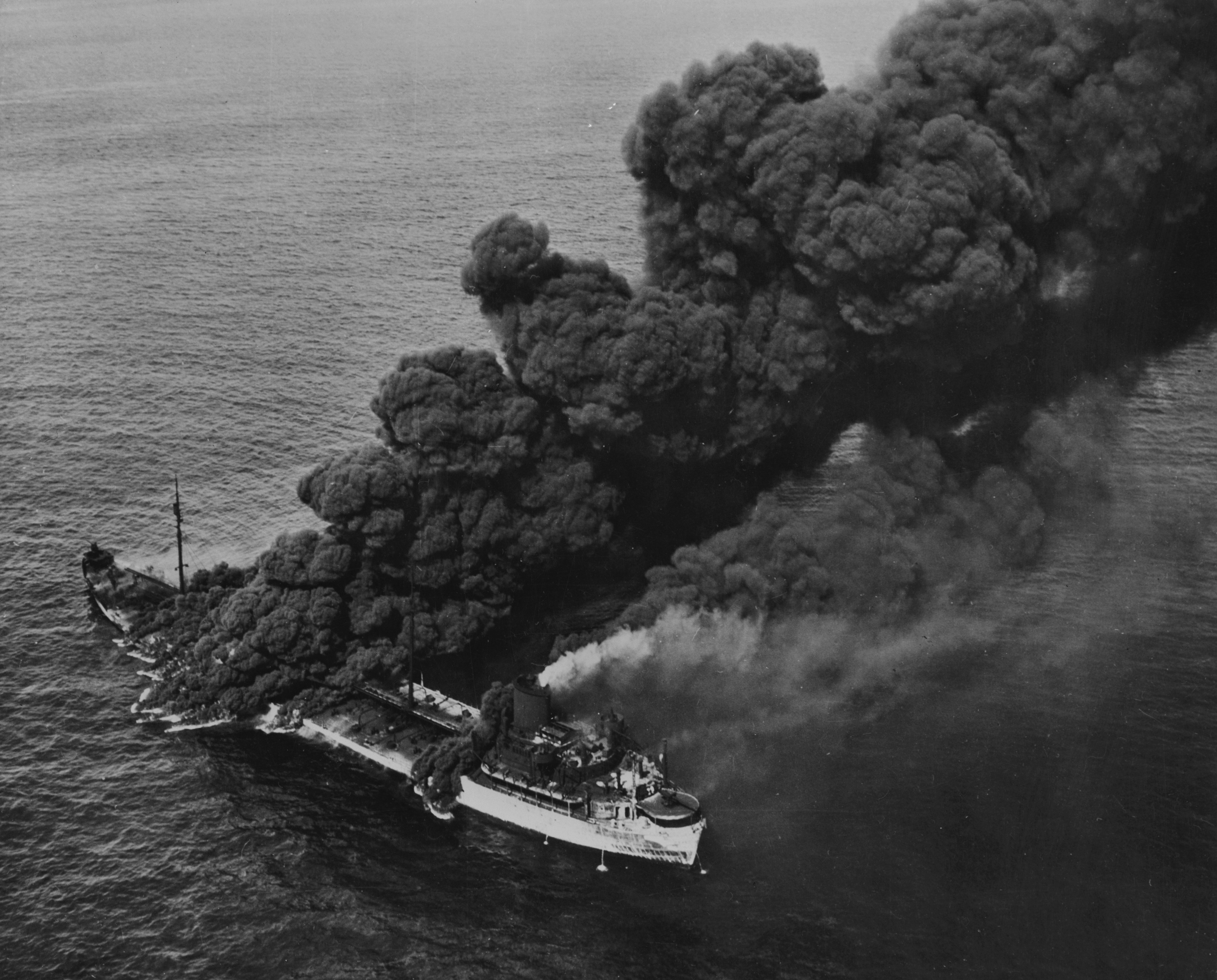
The tanker Pennsylvania Sun, torpedoed by U-571 on 15 July 1942 (was saved and returned to service in 1943)

The actual U-571, captained by Oberleutnant zur See Gustav Lüssow, was never involved in any such events, was not captured, and was in fact lost with all hands on 28 January 1944, west of Ireland. She was hit by depth charges, dropped from a Short Sunderland Mk III flying boat, EK577, callsign "D for Dog", belonging to No. 461 Squadron, Royal Australian Air Force (RAAF) and based at RAF Pembroke Dock in Wales. The aircraft's commander, Flt Lt Richard Lucas, reported that most of the U-boat's 52 crew managed to abandon ship, but all died from hypothermia.

The film portrays the U-boat sailors machine-gunning British merchant crewmen of the ship they sank; although Wassner clearly dislikes giving the order, and some of his men are just as unhappy as he is, Wassner argues that because the boat is so badly crippled, short on crew members and supplies, with sensitive information aboard, it is too risky to leave the British survivors to possibly report the U-boat's position. The shooting of survivors could also be seen more as mercy killings rather than leaving them to die. As shown later with Tyler and his crew keeping Wassner alive; sabotage is a possibility as well. In reality, U-boat crewmen are far more often known to have assisted survivors with food, directions and occasionally medical aid. Such assistance only stopped after Admiral Karl Dönitz issued the "Laconia order" following a US air attack on U-boats transporting injured survivors under a Red Cross flag in 1942. German U-boat crews were thereafter under War Order No. 154 not to rescue survivors, which parallelled Allied policy. Afterward, U-boats still occasionally provided aid for survivors. In fact, out of several thousand of sinkings of merchant ships in World War II, there is only one verifiable case of a U-boat's crew deliberately attacking the survivors: that of U-852 after the sinking of the Greek ship Peleus in 1944.

The real USS S-33 was stationed in the Pacific Ocean from June 1942 until the end of the war. She was sold for scrap in 1946. When Lt. Cmdr. Dahlgren orders Lt. Tyler to take down the captured German U-boat, he cries out "Take her down!" These were the last words of Lieutenant Commander Howard W. Gilmore who posthumously received the Medal of Honor for his self-sacrifice in saving his boat, USS Growler (SS-215). Mazzola mentions that S-26 sank in a test dive. The real S-26 did not sink in a test dive, instead sinking in a collision with a patrol combatant, PC-460, in January 1942.

The Kriegsmarine destroyer Z-49 was ordered on 12 June 1943 but never laid down, let alone completed and sailed.

=== Technical inaccuracies ===
As in most films, the audible sonar "ping" is not accurate, and is introduced for the audience's benefit. The sound of WW2 German Gruppenhorchgerät system was more complex, whilst the more advanced ASDIC system used by the British Navy used frequencies outside the range of human hearing.

The Kriegsmarine destroyers rarely ventured out into the open Atlantic Ocean, but usually stayed in European coastal waters. During the destroyer's depth charge attack more than eighty depth charges are detonated in the film, despite the fact that they rarely carried more than thirty.

The German resupply U-boat would most likely not have been sunk by U-571. This would have been difficult for a German U-boat to achieve, as German sonar was not as advanced as British during the war. The only instance of a submerged submarine sinking another submerged vessel was in February 1945 when HMS Venturer sank U-864 with torpedoes.

German Type XIV supply U-boats or Milchkühe ("milk cows") did not have torpedo tubes or deck guns, being armed only with anti-aircraft guns for defense, and therefore could not have attacked other vessels.

== See also ==
- Submarine films
- History of cryptology – World War II cryptology

== Sources ==
- Kahn, David (1991). Seizing the Enigma: the Race to Break the German U-Boat Codes, 1939–1943. Boston: Houghton Mifflin. ISBN 0-395-42739-8 – via Internet Archive.
- Sebag-Montefiore, Hugh (2001) [2000]. Enigma: The Battle For the Code (4th, pbk. Phoenix ed.). London: Weidenfeld & Nicolson. ISBN 0-75381-130-8.
