= Joe Baker-Cresswell =

Royal Navy officer

Captain Joe Baker-Cresswell DSO
- Born: 2 February 1901; Mayfair, London
- Died: 4 March 1997 (aged 96); Bamburgh, Northumberland
- Burial place: St Aidan's Church, Bamburgh, Northumberland, England
- Military career
- Allegiance: United Kingdom
- Branch: Royal Navy
- Service years: 1919–1951
- Rank: Captain
- Units: HMS Tiger; HMS Castor; HMS Veronica; HMS Adventure; HMS Nelson; HMS Rodney
- Commands: HMS Arrow; HMS Bulldog; HMS Gambia
- Conflicts: World War II
- Awards: DSO
- Other work: High Sheriff of Northumberland

Captain Addison Joe Baker-Cresswell DSO (2 February 1901 – 4 March 1997) was a Royal Navy officer, aide-de-camp to King George VI and High Sheriff of Northumberland. He is noted prominently for his role as the commanding officer of HMS Bulldog during the capture of U-110, from which an intact Enigma cipher machine was seized.

== Background and early life ==
Gresham's

Baker-Cresswell was born in Mayfair, London, the younger of the two sons of Major Addison Francis Baker-Cresswell (1874–1921), a Grenadier Guards officer and a member of a landowning family from Northumberland, and his wife Idonea Fitzherbert Widdrington (1869–1967). The elder brother, John Baker-Cresswell (1899–1920), was a lieutenant in the Royal Navy who was drowned in an accident at Portsmouth. His younger sister Violet Rosemary Cresswell (b. 1904), was acting as lady in waiting to Queen Marie of Yugoslavia during her years of exile in Great Britain.

Baker-Cresswell was educated at Gresham's School, Holt, where he was a member of the school's Officer Training Corps.

== Naval career ==
He joined the Royal Navy as a midshipman in 1919. His first ship was the battlecruiser HMS Tiger. He later served in the light cruiser HMS Castor based at Queenstown, Ireland, and in the sloop HMS Veronica, based in New Zealand. In 1927 he joined the minelayer HMS Adventure and the battleship HMS Nelson, then for three years was navigating officer on the battleship HMS Rodney. He was promoted commander in 1937.

When the Second World War began Baker-Cresswell was in Cairo as a member of General Wavell's staff. He was given his first commands in 1940, first the destroyer Arrow and a few months later the destroyer Bulldog, based in Iceland and leading the 3rd escort group.

On 9 May 1941, the 3rd escort group was attacked while escorting a merchant convoy in the Atlantic by the German submarine U-110 commanded by Kapitänleutnant Fritz-Julius Lemp, who had sunk the liner Athenia on the first day of the war. After Lemp had sunk two merchant ships and the corvette Aubrietia had dropped ten depth charges on him, the U-boat surfaced. Baker-Creswell had ordered the submarine to be sunk, but suddenly remembered a staff college lecture about searching enemy vessels for 'cipher books' and intelligence.

Consequently, he sent a search party, under Sub-Lt. David Balme to board U-110 and 'mooch around'. Balme and party stripped the submarine of all its equipment, including U-110′s Enigma cipher machine, code settings for high-security traffic, and code book for U-boat short-signal reports. Baker-Cresswell took U-110 in tow, but she sank within hours.

Baker-Cresswell was awarded the DSO and promoted captain. Balme received the Distinguished Service Cross. King George VI told them the capture of the U-110 cipher material had been "the most important single event in the whole war at sea".

Baker-Cresswell then joined the Joint Intelligence Staff in London, before becoming training captain in command of the steam yacht Philante. In 1943 he was appointed chief of staff to the commander-in-chief, western approaches, Admiral Sir Max Horton, then he went on to command the Royal Navy's East Indies escort force until 1945.

After the war, from 1946 to 1948, he commanded the cruiser HMS Gambia in the Far East. He was deputy director of Naval Intelligence, 1948 to 1951.

He retired in 1951, and was appointed aide-de-camp to King George VI. His role in shortening the war was kept classified until the 1980s.

== Family ==
On 24 August 1926, Baker-Cresswell married Rona Eileen Vaile, the daughter of H. E. Vaile, of Glade Hall, Epsom, Auckland, New Zealand. They had three children: two daughters, Rosemary (born 1928) and Pamela (born 1931), and one son, Charles (born 1935).

== Retirement ==
In retirement, Baker-Cresswell settled at Budle Hall in Northumberland, managing his estate near Bamburgh. He became a justice of the peace and was High Sheriff of Northumberland in 1962. He was also a member of the Royal Yacht Squadron. He died in Bamburgh, Northumberland, aged 96.

== U-571 movie ==
The movie U-571 was based on Baker-Cresswell's capture of the German Enigma machine, with the action transferred to the Mediterranean and the heroes becoming Americans.

The film was raised at Prime Minister's Question Time where Tony Blair agreed with questioner Brian Jenkins MP that the film was "an affront" to British sailors. On BBC Radio 4's Today programme, Charles Baker-Cresswell commented. "It's a typical American approach. We've seen this time and time again."
