= Captain Baker =

Captain Baker may refer to:

- James A. Baker (born 1857) (1857–1941), American attorney
- Valentine Baker (pilot) (1888–1942), British Armed Forces pilot
- Captain Baker, character in Bullitt
- Jay Baker, American sheriff for Cherokee County, Georgia involved in the 2021 Atlanta spa shootings

== See also ==
- Joe Baker-Cresswell (1901–1997), Royal Navy officer
