= Fritz-Julius Lemp =

German U-boat commander

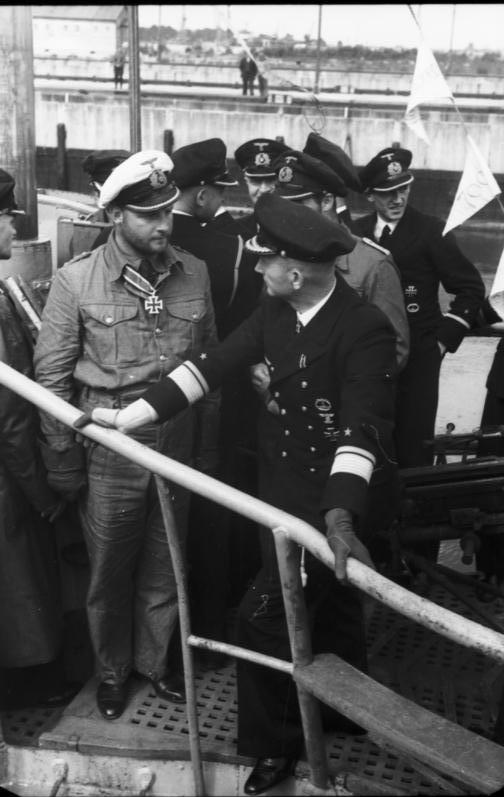
- Fritz-Julius Lemp (with Karl Dönitz)
- Born: 19 February 1913; Tsingtao, China
- Died: 9 May 1941 (aged 28); U-110, North Atlantic Ocean, off Cape Farewell, Greenland
- Military career
- Allegiance: Nazi Germany
- Branch: Kriegsmarine
- Rank: Kapitänleutnant
- Commands: U-28; U-30; U-110
- Conflicts: Battle of the Atlantic
- Awards: Knight's Cross of the Iron Cross

Fritz-Julius Lemp (German: [fʁɪt͡s ˈjuːli̯ʊs lɛmp]; 19 February 1913 – 9 May 1941) was a captain in the Kriegsmarine during World War II and commander of U-28, U-30 and U-110.

He sank the British passenger liner SS Athenia in September 1939, in violation of the Hague conventions. Germany's responsibility for the sinking was suppressed by Admiral Karl Dönitz and the Nazi propaganda. Lemp died on 9 May 1941 when the U-boat he commanded was captured.

== Career ==
=== Sinking of SS Athenia ===
On 3 September 1939, while in command of U-30, he sank the 13,581 ton passenger ship Athenia, the first British ship sunk in World War II. Lemp later claimed that the fact she was steering a zigzag course which seemed to be well off the normal shipping routes made him believe she was either a troopship or an armed merchant cruiser; when he realized his error he took the first steps to conceal the facts by omitting to make an entry in the submarine's log, and swearing his crew to secrecy. Adolf Hitler decided the incident should be kept secret for political reasons, and the German newspaper Völkischer Beobachter published an article which blamed the loss of the Athenia on the British, accusing Winston Churchill, then First Lord of the Admiralty, of sinking the ship to turn neutral opinion against Nazi Germany. The truth did not emerge until January 1946 at the Nuremberg trials, during the case against Grand Admiral Erich Raeder, when a statement by Admiral Dönitz was read in which he admitted that Athenia had been torpedoed by U-30 and every effort had been made to cover it up, including ordering Lemp to alter his log book.

=== U-110 ===
U-110 was captured on 9 May 1941 in the North Atlantic south of Iceland by the destroyers HMS Bulldog, HMS Broadway and the British corvette HMS Aubrietia. After depth charges forced the boat to the surface, where she was shelled, Lemp ordered the crew to abandon ship and open the vents in order to sink the crippled U-boat.

Lemp was not among the 34 survivors rescued by the Allied vessels, and one account of his fate has him swimming back to the submarine when he realized that the scuttling charges were not going to detonate, and either being shot and killed by the boarding party or drowning in the icy water. After the war the Germans claimed that Lemp had been shot in the water, either by Sub-Lieutenant Balme's boarding party from HMS Bulldog or from the Bulldog. Balme, however, assured German journalists that no shot had been fired at any time by his party. Joe Baker-Cresswell, commander of the Bulldog, also denied that Lemp had been shot, and the official British explanation remains that Lemp committed suicide by drowning when he realized the consequences of his failure. Balme's party boarded the U-boat, capturing an intact Enigma machine and the code books, which contributed to the deciphering of German military codes by British intelligence based at Bletchley Park.

== Awards ==
- Wehrmacht Long Service Award 4th Class (2 October 1936)
- Spanish Cross in Bronze (6 September 1939)
- Iron Cross (1939) 2nd Class (27 September 1939) & 1st Class (18 January 1940)
- Knight's Cross of the Iron Cross on 14 August 1940 as Kapitänleutnant and commander of U-30
