= Operation Primrose =

Operation Primrose was the code-name of two British naval operations in the Second World War:

- Operation Primrose (1940), a failed Royal Marines landing at Ålesund, Norway during the Norwegian campaign
- Operation Primrose (1941), the term used to describe the capture of U-110 and the attendant intelligence coup breaking the Enigma code.
