= USS S-33 =

Submarine of the United States

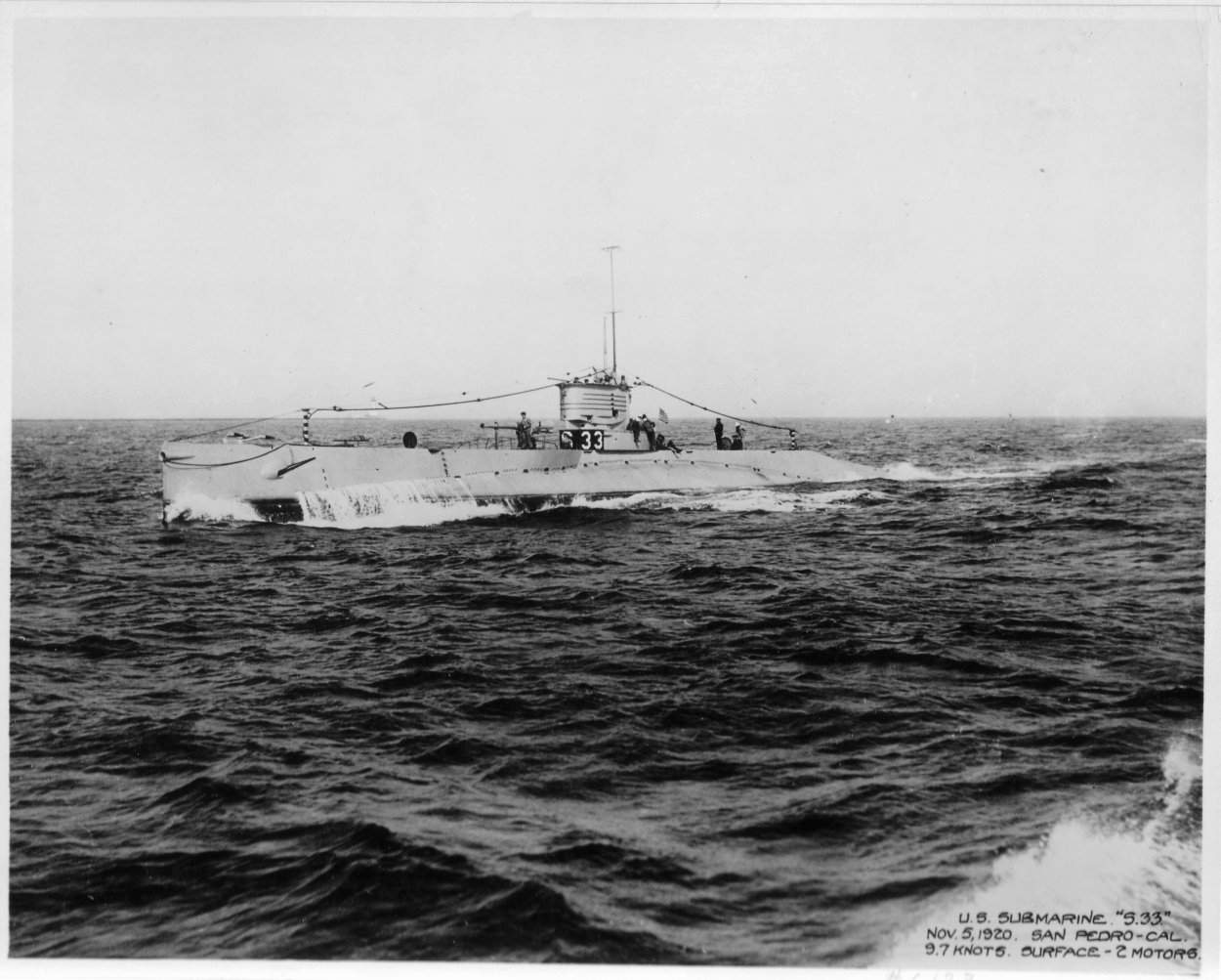
- USS S-33 (SS-138)

History

United States
- Name: USS S-33
- Builder: Union Iron Works, San Francisco, California
- Laid down: 14 June 1918
- Launched: 5 December 1918
- Sponsored by: Mrs. Thomas M. Searles
- Commissioned: 18 April 1922
- Decommissioned: 15 June 1922
- Recommissioned: 21 December 1922
- Decommissioned: 1 December 1937
- Recommissioned: 16 October 1940
- Decommissioned: 23 October 1945
- Stricken: 1 November 1945
- Fate: Sold for scrap 1946

General characteristics
- Class & type: S-class submarine
- Displacement: 854 long tons (868 t) surfaced; 1,062 long tons (1,079 t) submerged
- Length: 219 ft 3 in (66.83 m)
- Beam: 20 ft 8 in (6.30 m)
- Draft: 15 ft 11 in (4.85 m)
- Speed: 14.5 knots (16.7 mph; 26.9 km/h) surfaced; 11 knots (13 mph; 20 km/h) submerged
- Complement: 38 officers and men
- Armament: 1 × 4 in (102 mm)/50 deck gun; 4 × 21-inch (533 mm) torpedo tubes

Service record
- Operations: World War II
- Awards: 1 battle star

USS S-33 (SS-138) was a first-group (S-1 or "Holland") S-class submarine of the United States Navy.

== Construction and commissioning ==
S-33′s keel was laid down on 14 June 1918 by the Union Iron Works in San Francisco, California. She was launched on 5 December 1918 sponsored by Mrs. Thomas M. Searles, and commissioned on 18 April 1922.

== Early years ==
Commissioned as crankshaft modifications were ordered for her class, S-33 proceeded from her homeport, San Pedro Submarine Base, San Pedro, California, to New London, Connecticut, where she was decommissioned on 15 June and turned over to the prime contractor, the Electric Boat Company, for the alterations. She was recommissioned on 21 December 1922, and assigned, temporarily, to Submarine Division 11 for winter maneuvers. In January 1923, she moved south to the Caribbean Sea. During February, she participated in Fleet Problem I, which tested the defenses of the Panama Canal. Then, in late March, she rejoined the boats of her own division, Division 16, and headed back to San Pedro. The following January, 1924, she returned to the Panama Canal Zone and the Caribbean Sea for further fleet problems and exercises and then operated primarily off southern California into 1926. The previous year, 1925, Division 16 had been transferred to the Asiatic Fleet, and, in November 1926, S-33 moved west to join her sister ships at Cavite. On 22 December, she arrived at that Luzon submarine base and, for the next five years, operated as a unit of the Asiatic Fleet. During the fall and winter months, local exercises and annual overhauls kept her in the Philippines. Each spring, she deployed to the China coast for division and fleet exercises out of her summer base at Tsingtao.

In 1932, Division 16 was transferred to Pearl Harbor; and, in May, S-33 retraced her route across the Pacific. She operated in Hawaiian waters for five years. Then, ordered inactivated, she departed Pearl Harbor for the United States East Coast on 14 June 1937. Two months later, she arrived at Philadelphia, Pennsylvania. On 1 December, she was decommissioned and, until 1940, was berthed at League Island.

== Reactivation and defensive patrols ==
That summer, increased United States involvement in World War II brought activation orders, and, on 16 October 1940, S-33 was recommissioned. She conducted trials and exercises out of Philadelphia into the spring of 1941. Then, in April, she moved north to New London, the homeport for her division, Submarine Division 52.

The submarine then conducted exercises and patrols off the southern New England coast and out of Bermuda. Toward the end of 1941, however, her operational area was extended, and she moved up to the Newfoundland coast to test S-boat capabilities under high latitude conditions. She returned to New London after the entry of the United States into World War II and at the end of December 1941, proceeded to Philadelphia for an overhaul. From Philadelphia, she moved south to the Panama Canal Zone and, before the end of May 1942, had conducted two defensive patrols in the western approaches to the canal. In June 1942, she proceeded on to San Diego, California, and, toward the end of the month, moved north to the Aleutian Islands.

== First, second, and third war patrols ==
S-33 arrived at Dutch Harbor, Unalaska, in early July. On 7 July 1942, she departed on her first offensive war patrol. For the first week, she patrolled in the Adak area, then shifted to the Near Islands. There, off Agattu, fog prevailed from 15–29 July. On the morning of 30 July 1942, visibility increased to about four miles for a few hours but then diminished again. Six days later, the S-boat encountered her first clear day, but fog and mist soon returned. On 7 August 1942, S-33 was ordered back to Dutch Harbor.

== Fourth, fifth, and sixth war patrols ==
On her second Aleutian patrol, 24 August to 26 September 1942, S-33 served as a protective scout during the occupation of Adak. Then, on 2 September 1942, she shifted west to hunt off Kiska. She sighted three enemy ships, but Japanese antisubmarine measures, surface and air, prevented her attacking the first two targets and fog saved the third. Poor visibility, rough seas, and slow speed hindered hunting during her fifth war patrol, conducted in the Kiska area from 15 October to 11 November. Her sixth, 23 November to 9 December in the Attu area, yielded no enemy contacts.

== Refit ==
On 11 December 1942, S-33 departed Dutch Harbor for San Diego where she provided services to the West Coast Sound School into February 1943, then underwent overhaul in which she received a fathometer, new radio, radar, keel-mounted sound equipment, and a new distilling unit.

== Seventh and eighth war patrols ==
On 18 April 1943, S-33 returned to Dutch Harbor, whence she conducted three more war patrols. Her seventh and eighth patrols were conducted in the Kuril Islands, off Shimushu and Paramushiro from 25 April to 22 May and from 4 June to 2 July. During her seventh patrol, a U.S. Navy PBY Catalina flying boat dropped two depth charges on her at Longitude 165 degrees East by the plane's reckoning; the PBY′s target initially was reported to the submarine USS S-32 (SS-137), but after S-32 reported no interactions with aircraft, S-33 identified herself as the target of the PBY's attack and reported that it had occurred 30 nautical miles (56 km; 35 mi) east of the position the PBY indicated and that she had suffered no damage or casualaties.

Contacts on both patrols were few, and S-33 was able to attack successfully only two, both large fishing sampans which she left burning on 18 June 1943. She conducted her ninth and last war patrol, a photographic reconnaissance of Buldir and Kiska Islands, from 14 July to 9 August 1943, then got underway to return to California.

== Overhaul and retirement ==
S-33 arrived at San Diego at the end of August 1943, underwent overhaul, and, then, commenced operations with the West Coast Sound School which were continued until 13 August 1945. Two days later, hostilities ended in the Pacific, and S-33 was ordered to San Francisco for inactivation. She was decommissioned on 23 October 1945 and struck from the Naval Vessel Register on 1 November. The following year, her hulk was sold for scrapping to the Salco Iron and Metal Company in San Francisco.

== Awards ==
- American Defense Service Medal with "A" device
- American Campaign Medal
- Asiatic-Pacific Campaign Medal with one battle star for World War II service
- World War II Victory Medal

== In popular culture ==
A fictional version of S-33 is depicted as part of the United States Atlantic Fleet in 1942 in the 2000 film U-571, starring Matthew McConaughey, Bill Paxton, and Jon Bon Jovi.
