= SS Fanad Head =

UK cargo steamship sunk during World War II

Coordinates: 56°43′N 15°21′W

History

United Kingdom
- Name: Fanad Head
- Namesake: Fanad, County Donegal
- Owner: Ulster Steam Ship Co Ltd.
- Operator: G. Heyn & Sons Ltd, Belfast
- Port of registry: Belfast
- Builder: Workman, Clark and Company, Belfast
- Launched: 24 February 1917
- Completed: 1917
- Out of service: 14 September 1939
- Identification: code letters JQCM (until 1933); Call sign GNWD (1934–39); UK official number 136354
- Fate: Torpedoed and sunk on 14 September 1939

General characteristics
- Type: cargo steamship
- Tonnage: 5,200 GRT; tonnage under deck 4,845; 3,285 NRT
- Length: 390.4 ft (119.0 m) p/p
- Beam: 51.8 ft (15.8 m)
- Draught: 32 ft 6 in (9.91 m)
- Depth: 29.8 ft (9.1 m)
- Installed power: 379 NHP
- Propulsion: triple-expansion steam engine; single screw
- Speed: 11 knots (20 km/h)
- Capacity: 8 passengers
- Crew: 33
- Sensors & processing systems: wireless direction finding

SS Fanad Head was a UK cargo steamship. She was built during the First World War and torpedoed and sunk ten days after the UK entered the Second World War.

== Building ==
Workman, Clark and Company of Belfast built Fanad Head for the Ulster Steam Ship Co Ltd (G. Heyn & Sons Ltd). She was completed in 1917 and registered in Belfast. She was named after Fanad, a headland in County Donegal.

== Sinking ==
=== Initial attacks and response ===
When the UK entered the Second World War on 3 September 1939 Fanad Head was in Canada. She sailed from Montreal carrying general cargo and grain to the UK, and on 14 September she was steaming unescorted off the coast of Ireland when at 1323 hours she was sighted by the German submarine U-30. The U-boat surfaced and gave chase, and Fanad Head radioed for assistance. Some 280 nautical miles (520 km) west-northwest of Malin Head U-30 fired a shot across the cargo ship's bow from her 88 mm gun, which persuaded Fanad Head's Master, George Pinkerton, to stop. Pinkerton, his 33 crew and eight passengers abandoned ship in two lifeboats. U-30 took them in tow and put a prize crew aboard her to gather provisions and then scuttle the ship.

The distress call reached the aircraft carrier HMS Ark Royal, then on an anti-submarine patrol 200 miles (320 km) north-east of Fanad Head's position. Ark Royal quickly launched three Blackburn Skuas of 803 Naval Air Squadron, and detached the Tribal-class destroyers HMS Bedouin, HMS Punjabi and HMS Tartar to go to Fanad Head's assistance. 30 minutes after launching the first wave of aircraft, Ark Royal herself was attacked by U-39. She succeeded in avoiding the torpedoes and her escorts subsequently sank U-39. After two hours, Ark Royal launched six Swordfish aircraft and detached the F-class destroyers HMS Fame and HMS Forester as reinforcements.

=== Bombing attempts ===
When the first Skua reached Fanad Head, the pilots were surprised to find the U-boat surfaced alongside her and dropped the bombs immediately at very low level. The bombs detonated on contact with the water, causing shrapnel to hit the aircraft, damaging it enough to force the pilot to ditch his burning Skua in the sea. Both crewmen survived the crash, but were badly burnt and began swimming towards Fanad Head. Only the pilot managed to reach the ship and was pulled unconscious from the water. U-30 had crash-dived by the stern and avoided damage, but one of its crew had not had time to get below deck before she had submerged, so he too swam to Fanad Head. Meanwhile, the bombs dropped by the Skua had detonated so close to the ship that three men from the prize crew were wounded by shrapnel.

Ten minutes after the first attack, the second Skua reached the scene. Its crew sighted what they believed was a U-boat and dropped their bombs, but this was probably the wreck of the first Skua. When U-30 then surfaced nearby they had no bombs left, but repeatedly strafed her with machine gun fire and forced her to dive again. After the aircraft, low on fuel, left to return to Ark Royal, the U-boat re-surfaced and tried to return alongside Fanad Head to take off the prize crew. The third Skua then arrived and sighting U-30, dropped its bombs, but again from an insufficient height. Damage from the explosion caused the Skua to fall into the sea. The pilot managed to get free, and swim to Fanad Head, where he too was taken aboard by the German prize crew.

=== Torpedoing ===
U-30 continued to attempt to come alongside, but damaged her bow in her third attempt. She eventually managed to take aboard the five members of the prize crew. The Royal Naval pilots initially remained aboard, but on being told that U-30 intended to torpedo Fanad Head, they jumped overboard and were captured. Shortly afterwards, the first Swordfish arrived and made a strafing run that again forced the U-boat to dive. At 1820 hours U-30 launched a G7a torpedo from one of her stern tubes at Fanad Head from a range of 500 metres (550 yd), causing her to sink. U-30 was then repeatedly attacked with bombs from the Swordfishes and depth charges from the two destroyers which had reached the scene. HMS Tartar rescued Fanad Head's passengers and crew and took them to Mallaig, Scotland. U-30 was attacked until 2200 hours, suffering considerable damage, before managing to escape on the surface one hour later.

U-30 then made for Reykjavík, reaching there on 19 September. Here the submarine landed one of her seriously injured crewmen and took aboard a replacement from an interned German freighter. U-30 then returned to Germany with the two captured Royal Naval pilots, reaching Wilhelmshaven on 27 September. The pilots spent the rest of the war in a prisoner of war camp in Brunswick.

=== The Repair Shop ===
The Repair Shop is a UK television programme in which people bring in artefacts with an interesting history for restoration by a team of craftsmen. In Series 6 Episode 1 a Jo Blackwell from Chichester brought in the compass and binnacle from one of the lifeboats used to escape from SS Fanad Head at its sinking. She related how her grandparents, father and his two brothers were amongst the passengers and at the time of rescue by HMS Tartar her grandfather asked to remove and keep the compass and binnacle. Photographs of her family in the lifeboat at the time were shown and she related how her grandmother lost a shoe climbing the boarding net. The binnacle was lovingly restored both as a family heirloom and as a tribute to the two airmen who lost their lives in the attack on the submarine.

== Links ==
- Dell, John. "The SS Fanad Head Incident". Dinger's Aviation Pages. tsohosts.
