= USS Hunt (DD-194) =

Clemson-class destroyer

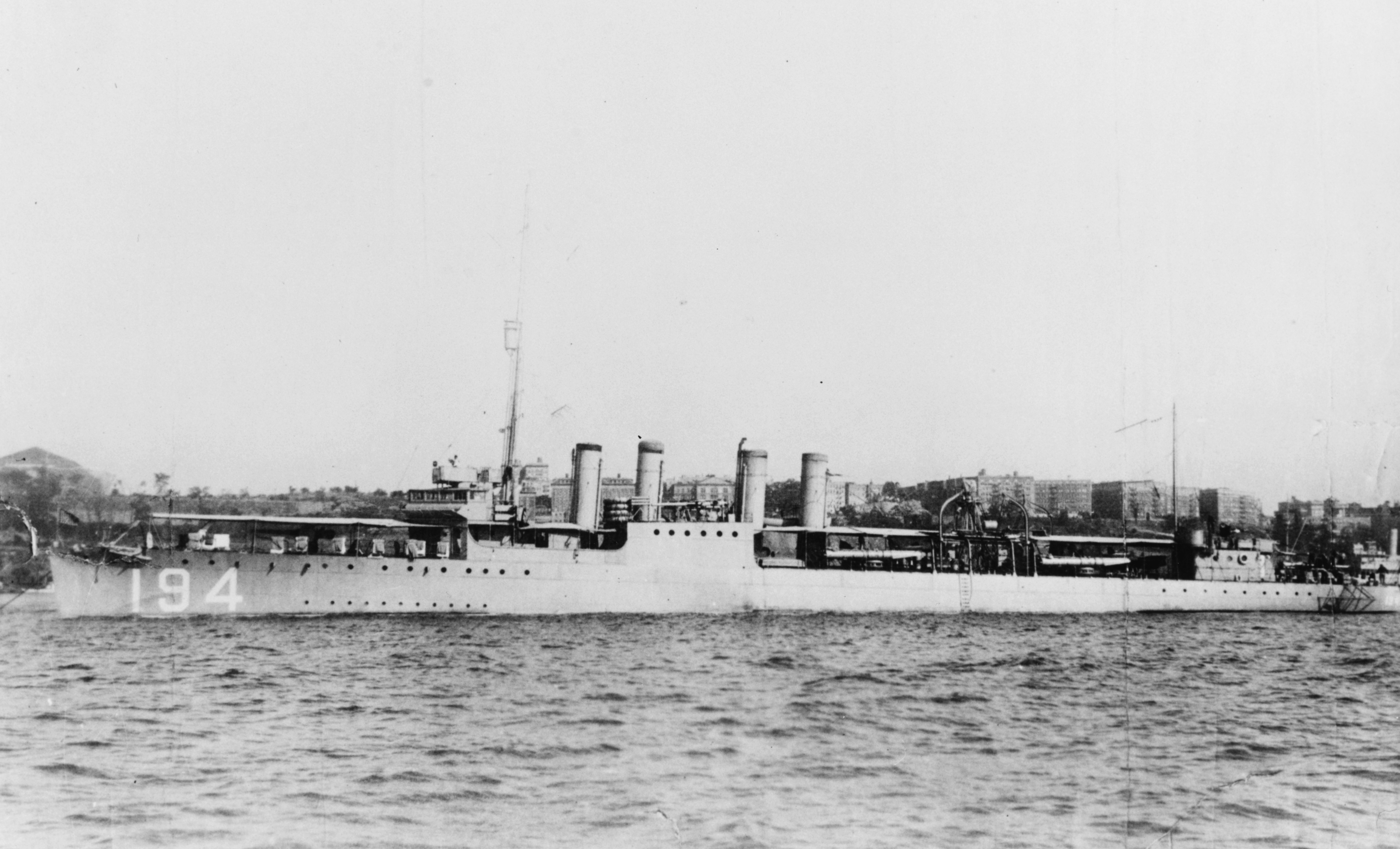
- USS Hunt (DD-194) in 1920

History

United States
- Namesake: William H. Hunt
- Builder: Newport News Shipbuilding & Dry Dock Company
- Laid down: 20 August 1918
- Launched: 14 February 1920
- Commissioned: 30 September 1920
- Decommissioned: 11 August 1922
- Fate: Transferred to USCG, 13 September 1930

United States
- Name: USCGD Hunt (CG-18)
- Acquired: 13 September 1930
- Commissioned: 8 October 1930
- Decommissioned: 28 May 1934
- Fate: Returned to USN, 28 May 1934

United States
- Acquired: 28 May 1934
- Commissioned: December 1939
- Decommissioned: 8 October 1940
- Stricken: 8 January 1941
- Fate: Transferred to UK, 8 October 1940

United Kingdom
- Name: HMS Broadway (H90)
- Acquired: 8 October 1940
- Commissioned: 8 October 1940
- Fate: Scrapped in 1947

General characteristics
- Class & type: Clemson-class destroyer
- Displacement: 1,215 tons
- Length: 314 ft 4 in (95.8 m)
- Beam: 31 ft 9 in (9.7 m)
- Draft: 9 ft 4 in (2.8 m)
- Propulsion: 26,500 shp (20 MW); geared turbines, 2 screws
- Speed: 35 knots (65 km/h)
- Range: 4,900 nmi (9,100 km); @ 15 kt
- Complement: 101 officers and enlisted
- Armament: 4 × 4 in (100 mm) guns, 1 × 3 in (76 mm) gun, 12 × 21 inch (533 mm) torpedo tubes.

USS Hunt (DD-194) was a Clemson-class destroyer in the United States Navy following World War I. She also served in the United States Coast Guard, as USCGD Hunt (CG-18). She was later transferred to the Royal Navy as HMS Broadway (H90).

== As USS Hunt/USCGD Hunt ==
The first Navy ship was named after Secretary of the Navy William H. Hunt (1823–1884), Hunt was launched by the Newport News Shipbuilding & Dry Dock Company, Newport News, Virginia, 14 February 1920; sponsored by Miss Virginia Livingston Hunt; and commissioned 30 September 1920.

After shakedown, Hunt participated in training and readiness exercises with the Atlantic Fleet and conducted torpedo trials on the range out of Newport, Rhode Island. She shifted her base of operations to Charleston, South Carolina, 3 December 1920. Sailing from Charleston Harbor 29 May 1922, she entered the Philadelphia Navy Yard 6 June and decommissioned there 11 August 1922.

From 13 September 1930 to 28 May 1934 the U.S. Coast Guard had custody of the ship. Hunt served as part of the Rum Patrol.

After being recommissioned at Philadelphia, Hunt departed on 26 January 1940 for Neutrality patrol in the Caribbean Sea. She left Panama Canal 3 April to escort submarine Searaven to Cape Canaveral and then engaged in gunnery practice in Cuban waters en route to Norfolk, Virginia arriving 17 April 1940. The next few months were devoted to maneuvers in Chesapeake Bay and training cruises down the eastern seaboard.

== As HMS Broadway ==
Hunt was one of the 50 overage ships exchanged with the British in the Destroyers for Bases Agreement. She got under way from Newport 3 October 1940, and reached Halifax, Nova Scotia on 5 October. The following day she embarked 100 British officers and sailors for training. On 8 October she decommissioned from the U.S. Navy and commissioned into the Royal Navy as HMS Broadway (H90).

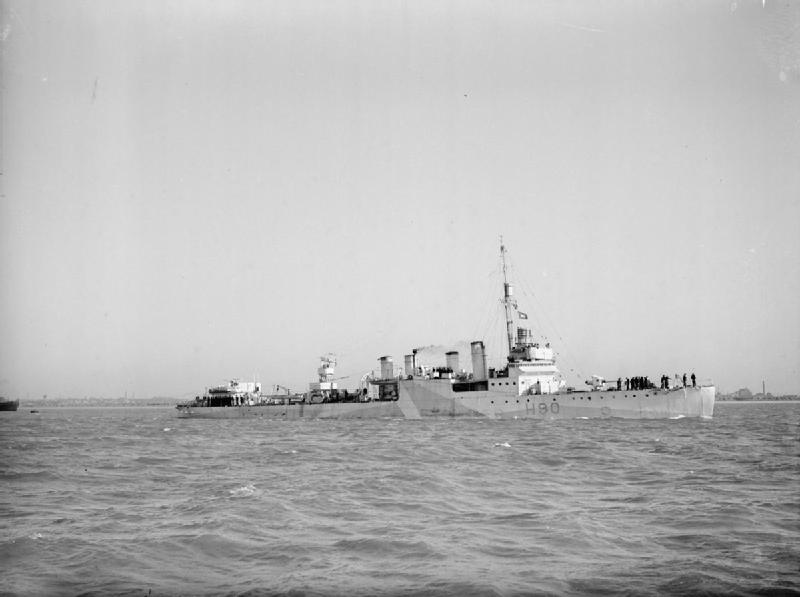
USS Hunt as HMS Broadway (H90).

Broadway arrived at Belfast on 24 October 1940, where she joined the 11th Escort Group, Western Approaches Command, with whom she engaged in escorting numerous convoys. On 9 May, while escorting convoy OB 318, she was involved, with the destroyer Bulldog and the corvette Aubrietia, in the capture of German submarine U-110 between Iceland and Greenland. On the previous night, the U-boat had crept in to attack OB 318, but was prevented from surfacing by the strong destroyer escort. The submarine continued to shadow the Allied ships until early in the afternoon watch when she launched three torpedoes from periscope depth. Broadway and her fellow escorts promptly counterattacked and forced her to surface where she surrendered. Unfortunately the prize sank while in tow to port, but not before her captors had recovered documents of great value and importance to the Allies' cause – including an intact Naval Enigma machine. U-110 was commanded by Korvettenkapitän Fritz-Julius Lemp who had made the first kill of the war by sinking the liner SS Athenia on 3 September 1939, the day the United Kingdom declared war. Lemp was lost with 14 members of his crew when U-110 sank, but a war correspondent, 4 officers and 28 men were rescued.

Broadway was modified for trade convoy escort service by removal of three of the original 4"/50 caliber guns and three of the triple torpedo tube mounts to reduce topside weight for additional depth charge stowage and installation of hedgehog. Broadway was assigned to Escort Group C-2 of the Mid-Ocean Escort Force for convoys ON 119, SC 97, ON 139, SC 108, ON 149, SC 113, ON 179 and HX 237 during the winter of 1942–43 While assigned to HX 237, on 12 May 1943 she joined the frigate Lagan and aircraft from escort carrier Biter in destroying another German submarine, U-89, which was sunk northeast of the Azores.

After refitting at Belfast in September 1943, Broadway became a target ship for aircraft and served as such at Rosyth in Scotland until the war ended in Europe. In May 1945 she left Rosyth for northern Norway with occupation forces. At Narvik, Norway, she took charge of a convoy of German submarines which was sailing for Trondheim. In the reduction of the British Navy after the war, Hunt was scrapped.
