= Reservehandverfahren =

German Naval World War II hand-cipher system

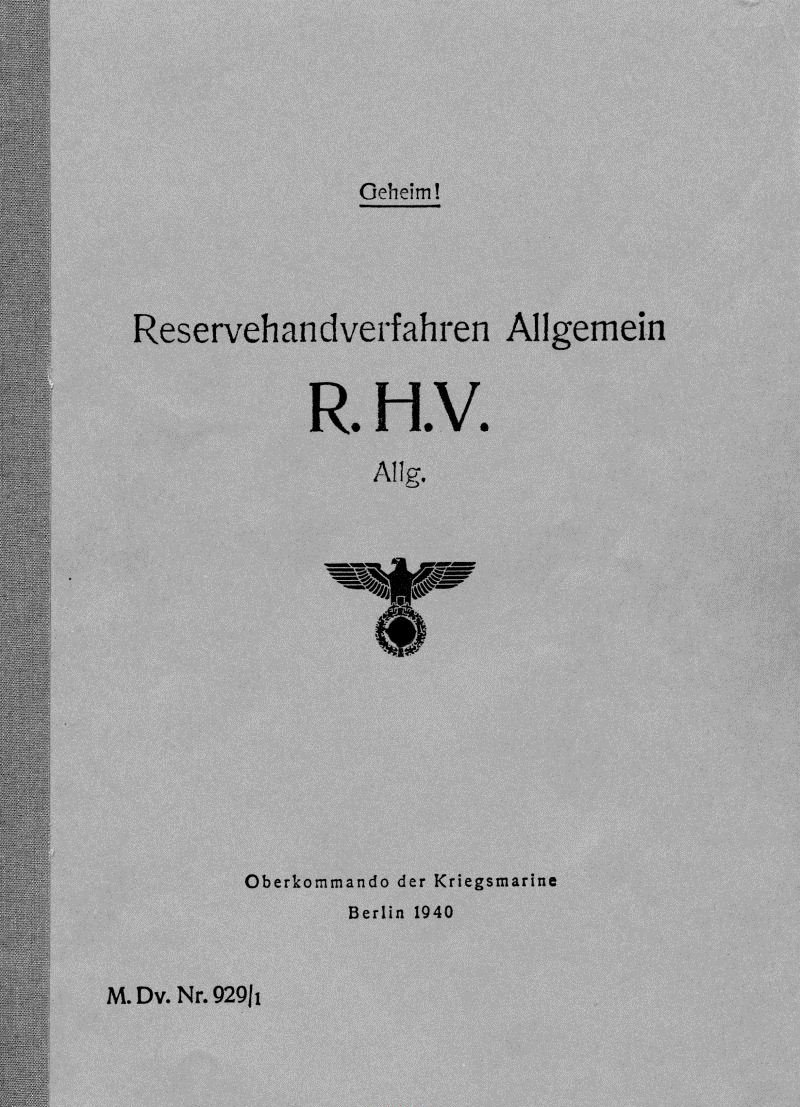
Front cover of general Reservehandverfahren instruction booklet

Reservehandverfahren (RHV) (English: Reserve Hand Procedure) was a German Naval World War II hand-cipher system used as a backup method when no working Enigma machine was available.

The cipher had two stages: a transposition followed by bigram substitution. In the transposition stage, the cipher clerk would write out the plaintext into a "cage" — a shape on a piece of paper. Pairs of letters were then substituted using a set of bigram tables.

The Reservehandverfahren cipher was first solved at Bletchley Park in June 1941 by means of documents captured from U-boat U-110 the previous month. Thereafter it was solved using cryptanalysis for over three years. Some 1,400 signals were read during that period. The section working on RHV was headed by historian Sir John H. Plumb. The decrypts were sometimes useful in themselves for the intelligence that they contained, but were more important as a source for cribs for solving Naval Enigma.

A Mediterranean variant was known as Schlüssel Henno, which was first tackled — unsuccessfully — in May 1943. It was not until after a capture of cipher documents from a raid on Mykonos in April 1944 that the Naval Section was able to read Henno. With over 1,000 signals a month, up to 30 people were assigned to solve the messages. A separate version of RHV existed for U-boats to use, called RHV Offizier. Only six messages in RHV Offizier were broken at Bletchley Park, three by James Hogarth. The work was abandoned in August 1944 after it was found the intelligence value of the decrypts was "rather disappointing".

== See also ==
- Werftschlüssel (in German)
