= German submarine U-30 (1936) =

German World War II submarine

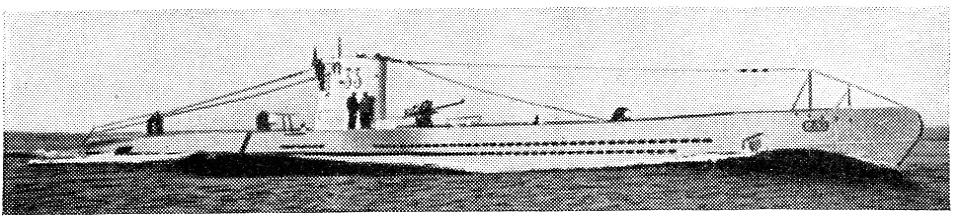
- U-33, a typical Type VIIA boat

History

Nazi Germany
- Name: U-30
- Ordered: 1 April 1935
- Builder: DeSchiMAG AG Weser, Bremen
- Cost: 4,189,000 Reichsmark
- Yard number: 911
- Laid down: 24 January 1936
- Launched: 4 August 1936
- Commissioned: 8 October 1936
- Decommissioned: 23 January 1945
- Fate: Scuttled in Kupfermühlen Bay on 5 May 1945

General characteristics
- Class & type: Type VIIA submarine
- Displacement: 626 t (616 long tons) surfaced; 745 t (733 long tons) submerged
- Length: 64.51 m (211 ft 8 in) o/a; 45.50 m (149 ft 3 in) pressure hull
- Beam: 5.85 m (19 ft 2 in) o/a; 4.70 m (15 ft 5 in) pressure hull
- Height: 9.50 m (31 ft 2 in)
- Draught: 4.37 m (14 ft 4 in)
- Installed power: 2,100–2,310 PS (1,540–1,700 kW; 2,070–2,280 bhp) (diesels); 750 PS (550 kW; 740 shp) (electric)
- Propulsion: 2 shafts; 2 × diesel engines; 2 × electric motors
- Speed: 17 knots (31 km/h; 20 mph) surfaced; 8 knots (15 km/h; 9.2 mph) submerged
- Range: 6,200 nmi (11,500 km; 7,100 mi) at 10 knots (19 km/h; 12 mph) surfaced; 73–94 nmi (135–174 km; 84–108 mi) at 4 knots (7.4 km/h; 4.6 mph) submerged
- Test depth: 220 m (720 ft); Crush depth: 230–250 m (750–820 ft)
- Complement: 4 officers, 40–56 enlisted
- Sensors & processing systems: Gruppenhorchgerät
- Armament: 5 × 53.3 cm (21 in) torpedo tubes (four bow, one stern); 11 × torpedoes or 22 TMA mines; 1 × 8.8 cm (3.46 in) deck gun (220 rounds); 1 × 2 cm (0.79 in) AA gun

Service record
- Part of: 2nd U-boat Flotilla; 8 October 1936 – 30 November 1940; 24th U-boat Flotilla; 1 December 1940 – 30 November 1943; 22nd U-boat Flotilla; 1 December 1943 – 12 January 1945
- Identification codes: M 05 559
- Commanders: Kptlt. Hans Cohausz; 8 October 1936 – 31 October 1938; Kptlt. Hans Pauckstadt; 15 February – 17 August 1938; Oblt.z.S. / Kptlt. Fritz-Julius Lemp; November 1938 – September 1940; K.Kapt. Robert Prützmann; September 1940 – 31 March 1941; Oblt.z.S. Paul-Karl Loeser; April 1941; Oblt.z.S. Hubertus Purkhold; April 1941; Oblt.z.S. Kurt Baberg; 23 April 1941 – 9 March 1942; Oblt.z.S. Hermann Bauer; 10 March – 4 October 1942; Lt.z.S. Franz Saar; 5 October – 16 December 1942; Lt.z.S. / Oblt.z.S. Ernst Fischer; May – 1 December 1943; Oblt.z.S. Ludwig Fabricius; 2 December 1943 – 14 December 1944; Oblt.z.S. Günther Schimmel; 17 – 23 January 1945
- Operations: 8 patrols: 1st patrol: 22 August – 27 September 1939; 2nd patrol: 9 – 14 December 1939; 3rd patrol: 23 December 1939 – 17 January 1940; 4th patrol: 11 – 30 March 1940; 5th patrol: 3 April – 4 May 1940; 6th patrol: 8 June – 7 July 1940; 7th patrol: 13 – 24 July 1940; 8th patrol: 5 – 30 August 1940
- Victories: 16 merchant ships sunk (86,165 GRT); 1 auxiliary warship sunk (325 GRT); 1 merchant ship damaged (5,642 GRT); 1 warship damaged (31,100 tons)

German submarine U-30 was a Type VIIA U-boat of Nazi Germany's Kriegsmarine that served during World War II. She was ordered in April 1935 in violation of the Treaty of Versailles, which prevented the construction and commissioning of any U-boats for the German navy, and as part of the German naval rearmament program known as Plan Z. She sank the liner SS Athenia (1922) on 3 September 1939, under the command of Fritz-Julius Lemp. She was retired from front-line service in September 1940 after undertaking eight war patrols, having sunk 17 vessels and damaging two others. U-30 then served in a training role until the end of the war when she was scuttled. She was later raised and broken up for scrap in 1948.

== Construction ==
U-30 was ordered by the Kriegsmarine on 1 April 1935 (as part of Plan Z and in violation of the Treaty of Versailles). Her keel was laid down on 24 January 1936 by AG Weser, Bremen as yard number 911. She was launched on 4 August and formally commissioned into the Kriegsmarine on 8 October under the command of Kapitänleutnant (Kptlt.) Hans Cohausz.

== Design ==
Like all Type VIIA submarines, U-30 had two MAN 6-cylinder 4-stroke M6V 40/46 diesel engines totalling 2,100–2,310 PS (1,540–1,700 kW; 2,070–2,280 bhp) as well as two Brown, Boveri & Cie GG UB 720/8 electric motors, that produced 750 PS (550 kW; 740 shp) and allowed her to travel at a maximum of 17 knots (31 km/h; 20 mph) while surfaced and 8 knots (15 km/h; 9.2 mph) submerged. She had a range of 6,200 nmi (11,500 km; 7,100 mi) at 10 knots (19 km/h; 12 mph) while on the surface and 73–94 nmi (135–174 km; 84–108 mi) at 4 knots (7.4 km/h; 4.6 mph) while submerged. U-30 had five torpedo tubes, (four in the bow, one in the stern). She could also carry a total of eleven 53.3 cm (21 in) torpedoes or 22 TMA mines or 33 TMB mines and had an 8.8 centimetres (3.5 in) C35/L45 deck gun (with 220 rounds). She was equipped with one 2 cm (0.79 in) C 30 anti-aircraft gun. After being commissioned and deployed, U-30 was stationed in the German port city of Wilhelmshaven.

== Service history ==
During her career U-30 was involved in eight war patrols and sank 16 merchant ships, totalling 86,165 gross register tons (GRT) and one auxiliary warship of 325 GRT. U-30 also damaged one commercial ship of 5,642 GRT and damaged the British battleship HMS Barham. All of these attacks took place under the command of Kptlt. Fritz-Julius Lemp.

=== First patrol and the sinking of Athenia ===
U-30 went to sea on 22 August 1939, before World War II began. Her active service career began on 3 September 1939, just 12 days after leaving Wilhelmshaven and only 10 hours after Great Britain declared war on Germany, she sank the 13,581 GRT passenger ship SS Athenia about 200 nmi (370 km; 230 mi) west of the Hebrides while she was en route from Liverpool to Montreal in Canada. The Athenia was the first ship sunk in World War II; out of 1,400 passengers, 112 of them, including 28 neutral Americans, died. After sinking Athenia, U-30 went on to sink two more vessels, Blairlogie and the SS Fanad Head.

Following the attack, the German Ministry of Propaganda checked incoming reports from both London and the German Naval High command. Having been told by the Kriegsmarine that there was not a single U-boat in the vicinity of Athenia on the day of her sinking, the Propaganda Ministry promptly denied all allegations that any German U-boat had sunk Athenia. They claimed instead that the British had torpedoed their own vessel in an attempt to bring the United States into the war on the side of the Allies.

In order to calm down any American response to the sinking of Athenia, Joachim von Ribbentrop, the German foreign minister, arranged a meeting between Grand Admiral Erich Raeder and the American naval attaché on 16 September 1939. During the meeting, Raeder assured the attaché that he had received reports from every German submarine at sea and "as a result of which it was definitely established that Athenia had not been sunk by a German U-boat". Raeder then asked the attaché to inform the American government. However, not every submarine had returned to port, and all U-boats maintained radio silence while at sea.

Once U-30 docked on 27 September, Admiral Karl Dönitz met Lemp while he was disembarking from the U-boat. Dönitz later said that Lemp looked "very unhappy" and that he told the Admiral that he was in fact responsible for the sinking of Athenia. Lemp had mistaken Athenia for an armed merchant cruiser, which he claimed was zig-zagging. Dönitz subsequently received orders that Athenia affair was to be kept a "total secret", the High Command of the Navy (OKM) were not to court-martial Lemp as they considered his actions in good faith, and that any other political explanations about the sinking of Athenia were to be handled by the OKM, who would deny any allegations that a German U-boat had sunk the vessel. In order to keep the sinking of Athenia a secret, Dönitz had U-30's log altered in order to erase any evidence. It was not until the Nuremberg trials in 1946 that the truth about the fate of the liner was brought forth publicly by the Germans.

=== Second patrol ===
As a result of the investigation undertaken by the German General Staff following the sinking of Athenia, U-30 remained in port until 9 December 1939, when she was finally allowed to put to sea again for her second war patrol. It lasted only six days, during which time she travelled up to the southern coast of (then neutral) Norway before returning to Wilhelmshaven on 14 December 1939. During the voyage U-30 did not encounter any enemy vessels, consequently she returned to port without any claims.

=== Third patrol ===
U-30's third patrol was much more successful. Having left Wilhelmshaven on 23 December 1939, she journeyed into the North Sea. She then circumnavigated the British Isles and travelled along the southern coast of Ireland. It was near to the west coast of Scotland that U-30 sank her first enemy vessel during her third patrol, the 325 GRT anti-submarine trawler HMS Barbara Robertson, on 28 December. That same day, she hit a much bigger target, the British battleship HMS Barham. Following the sinking of Barbara Robertson, U-30 fired a torpedo at the battleship and damaged her, killing four crew members. U-30's next three victims were sunk by mines laid by the U-boat: El Oso, sunk on 11 January; Gracia, damaged on 16 January and Cairnross, sunk on 17 January. Meanwhile, U-30 returned to her home port of Wilhelmshaven on 17 January 1940.

=== Fourth patrol ===
The fourth patrol that U-30 undertook began on 11 March 1940, when she left Wilhelmshaven for the west coast of Norway in preparation for the invasion of that country. For a period of 20 days, she traveled northeast along the Norwegian coast in search of any Allied convoys; she did not find any and returned to Wilhelmshaven on 30 March 1940.

=== Fifth patrol ===
Like her fourth patrol, U-30's fifth patrol ended without any losses. She put to sea on 3 April 1940 to support the German invasion of Norway and Denmark (codenamed Operation Weserubung). For 32 days, U-30 travelled up the west coast of Norway. She then headed southwest to Scotland in order to intercept British warships that were heading north to defend Norway. She failed to encounter any vessels, however, and returned to Wilhelmshaven, arriving there on 4 May.

=== Sixth patrol ===
U-30's sixth patrol was the first time in which she had sunk any enemy ships since her third patrol. Having left Wilhelmshaven on 8 June 1940, she once again entered the North Sea in an attempt to sink any Allied ships in the area. For 32 days, U-30 circumnavigated the British Isles and sank five enemy ships in the Bay of Biscay. The first vessel to be attacked was the 4,876 GRT British merchantman Otterpool, which was sunk on 20 June 1940. Two days later, the 3,999 GRT Norwegian vessel Randsfjord was sunk. On 28 June, the British ship Llanarth was torpedoed, followed by Beignon on 1 July and the Egyptian Angele Mabro on 6 July. Following these attacks, U-30 headed back to port. Instead of returning to Wilhelmshaven, however, U-30 put in at Lorient, in France, which had been captured after the fall of that country. In doing so, she became the first German U-boat to enter the port.

=== Later patrols and retirement ===
U-30 began her first patrol operating from Lorient and her seventh overall on 13 July 1940. During a period of 12 days, she traveled as far south as Portugal and sank the 712 GRT British ship Ellaroy on the 21st. Three days later, on 24 July, U-30 returned to Lorient, having experienced a malfunction in one of her engines. It then became clear that the boat was suffering a number of mechanical difficulties and as a result it was decided that she would need to be used sparingly. For her next patrol it was decided that she would leave from Lorient, but would return to Germany.

The eighth and last war patrol that U-30 was to undertake began on 5 August 1940, when she left Lorient for the North Atlantic. In 26 days, she travelled north of the British Isles, into the North Sea and entered the German port city of Kiel on 30 August 1940. During that time, she sank the Swedish vessel Canton on 9 August and the British steam merchantman Clan Macphee on 16 August 1940. Both of these attacks took place off the west coast of neutral Ireland. After these successes, however, U-30 once again experienced engine trouble and was forced to end her patrol early, returning to Germany. Before she arrived, Lemp received word that he had been awarded the Knight's Cross of the Iron Cross for the boat's previous war patrols.

Following her eighth patrol, U-30 was retired from front-line service on 15 September 1940 and was assigned to training flotillas in the Baltic for the rest of the war. After her retirement, many of U-30's experienced crew members, including Lemp, were transferred to U-110. In the last months of the war, U-30 was used as a range boat (gunnery platform) before being scuttled by her crew on 5 May 1945 at Flensburg in Kupfermühlen Bay, in order to avoid surrendering the boat to the Allies as part of Operation Regenbogen. The wreck of the U-boat was later raised and broken up in 1948.

=== Wolfpacks ===
U-30 took part in one wolfpack, namely:

- Prien (15 – 17 June 1940)

== Summary of raiding history ==
During her service in the Kriegsmarine, U-30 sank 16 merchant ships, a loss of 86,165 GRT, and one auxiliary warship for a loss of 325 GRT. She also damaged one merchant ship of 5,642 GRT and damaged the battleship HMS Barham.

Date	Ship	Nationality	Tonnage (Note: Merchant ship tonnages are in gross register tons. Military vessels are listed by tons displacement.)	Fate
3 September 1939	Athenia	United Kingdom	13,581	Sunk
11 September 1939	Blairlogie	United Kingdom	4,425	Sunk
14 September 1939	Fanad Head	United Kingdom	5,200	Sunk
28 December 1939	HMT Barbara Robertson	Royal Navy	325	Sunk
28 December 1939	HMS Barham	Royal Navy	31,100	Damaged
11 January 1940	El Oso	United Kingdom	7,267	Sunk
16 January 1940	Gracia	United Kingdom	5,642	Damaged
17 January 1940	Cairnross	United Kingdom	5,494	Sunk
7 February 1940	Munster	United Kingdom	4,305	Sunk
9 February 1940	Chagres	United Kingdom	5,406	Sunk
8 March 1940	Counsellor	United Kingdom	5,068	Sunk
20 June 1940	Otterpool	United Kingdom	4,876	Sunk
22 June 1940	Randsfjord	Norway	3,999	Sunk
28 June 1940	Llanarth	United Kingdom	5,053	Sunk
1 July 1940	Beignon	United Kingdom	5,218	Sunk
6 July 1940	Angele Mabro	Egypt	3,154	Sunk
21 July 1940	Ellaroy	United Kingdom	712	Sunk
9 August 1940	Canton	Sweden	5,779	Sunk
16 August 1940	Clan Macphee	United Kingdom	6,628	Sunk

== Bibliography ==
- Blair, Clay (2000a) [1996]. Hitler's U-boat War: The Hunters, 1939–1942. New York: Modern Library. ISBN 0-679-64032-0.
- Blair, Clay (2000b) [1996]. Hitler's U-boat War: The Hunted, 1942–1945. New York: Modern Library. ISBN 0-679-64033-9.
- Busch, Rainer; Röll, Hans-Joachim (1999). German U-boat commanders of World War II : a biographical dictionary. Translated by Brooks, Geoffrey. London, Annapolis, Md: Greenhill Books, Naval Institute Press. ISBN 1-55750-186-6.
- Gröner, Erich; Jung, Dieter; Maass, Martin (1991). German Warships 1815–1945, U-boats and Mine Warfare Vessels. Vol. 2. Translated by Thomas, Keith; Magowan, Rachel. London: Conway Maritime Press. ISBN 0-85177-593-4.
- Shirer, William L. (1990). The Rise and Fall of the Third Reich: A History of Nazi Germany. Simon and Schuster. ISBN 0-671-72868-7.
