= German submarine U-110 (1940) =

German World War II submarine

Coordinates: 60°22′N 33°12′W

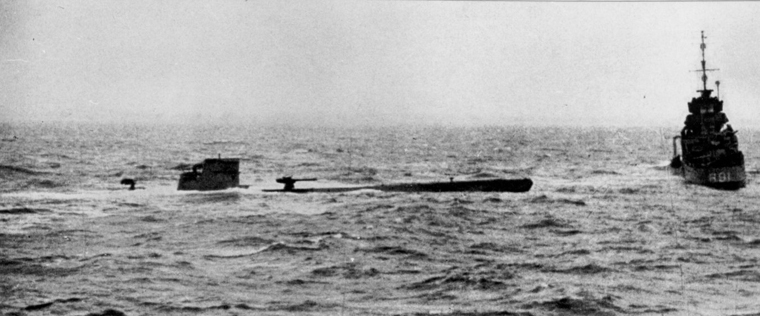
- U-110 and HMS Bulldog

History

Nazi Germany
- Name: U-110
- Ordered: 24 May 1938
- Builder: DeSchiMAG AG Weser, Bremen
- Yard number: 973
- Laid down: 1 February 1940
- Launched: 25 August 1940
- Commissioned: 21 November 1940
- Home port: Lorient, France
- Fate: Captured, 9 May 1941, sunk the following day

General characteristics
- Class & type: Type IXB submarine
- Displacement: 1,051 t (1,034 long tons) surfaced; 1,178 t (1,159 long tons) submerged
- Length: 76.50 m (251 ft) o/a; 58.75 m (192 ft 9 in) pressure hull
- Beam: 6.76 m (22 ft 2 in) overall; 4.40 m (14 ft 5 in) pressure hull
- Draught: 4.70 m (15 ft 5 in)
- Installed power: 4,400 PS (3,200 kW; 4,300 bhp) (diesels); 1,000 PS (740 kW; 990 bhp) (electric)
- Propulsion: 2 shafts; 2 × diesel engines; 2 × electric motors
- Speed: 18.2 knots (33.7 km/h; 20.9 mph) surfaced; 7.3 knots (13.5 km/h; 8.4 mph) submerged
- Range: 12,000 nmi (22,000 km; 14,000 mi) at 10 knots (19 km/h; 12 mph) surfaced; 64 nmi (119 km; 74 mi) at 4 knots (7.4 km/h; 4.6 mph) submerged
- Test depth: 230 m (750 ft)
- Complement: 48 to 56 officers and ratings
- Armament: 6 × torpedo tubes (4 bow, 2 stern); 22 × 53.3 cm (21 in) torpedoes; 1 × 10.5 cm (4.1 in) SK C/32 deck gun (180 rounds); 1 × 3.7 cm (1.5 in) SK C/30 AA gun; 1 × 2 cm FlaK 30 AA guns

Service record
- Part of: 2nd U-boat Flotilla; 21 November 1940 – 9 May 1941
- Identification codes: M 23 130
- Commanders: Kptlt. Fritz-Julius Lemp; 21 November 1940 – 9 May 1941
- Operations: 2 patrols: 1st patrol: 9 – 29 March 1941; 2nd patrol: 15 April – 9 May 1941
- Victories: 3 merchant ships sunk (10,149 GRT); 2 merchant ships damaged (8,675 GRT)

German submarine U-110 was a Type IXB U-boat of Nazi Germany's Kriegsmarine that operated during World War II. She was captured by the Royal Navy on 9 May 1941 and provided a number of secret cipher documents to the British. U-110's capture, later given the code name "Operation Primrose", was one of the biggest secrets of the war, remaining so for seven months. President Franklin D. Roosevelt was only told of the capture by Winston Churchill in January 1942.

== Design ==
Type IXB submarines were slightly larger than the original Type IX submarines, later designated IXA. U-110 had a displacement of 1,051 tonnes (1,034 long tons) when at the surface and 1,178 tonnes (1,159 long tons) while submerged. The U-boat had a total length of 76.50 m (251 ft 0 in), a pressure hull length of 58.75 m (192 ft 9 in), a beam of 6.76 m (22 ft 2 in), a height of 9.60 m (31 ft 6 in), and a draught of 4.70 m (15 ft 5 in). The submarine was powered by two MAN M 9 V 40/46 supercharged four-stroke, nine-cylinder diesel engines producing a total of 4,400 metric horsepower (3,240 kW; 4,340 shp) for use while surfaced, two Siemens-Schuckert 2 GU 345/34 double-acting electric motors producing a total of 1,000 metric horsepower (740 kW; 990 shp) for use while submerged. She had two shafts and two 1.92 m (6 ft) propellers. The boat was capable of operating at depths of up to 230 metres (750 ft).

The submarine had a maximum surface speed of 18.2 knots (33.7 km/h; 20.9 mph) and a maximum submerged speed of 7.3 knots (13.5 km/h; 8.4 mph). When submerged, the boat could operate for 64 nautical miles (119 km; 74 mi) at 4 knots (7.4 km/h; 4.6 mph); when surfaced, she could travel 12,000 nautical miles (22,000 km; 14,000 mi) at 10 knots (19 km/h; 12 mph). U-110 was fitted with six 53.3 cm (21 in) torpedo tubes (four fitted at the bow and two at the stern), 22 torpedoes, one 10.5 cm (4.13 in) SK C/32 naval gun, 180 rounds, and a 3.7 cm (1.5 in) SK C/30 as well as a 2 cm (0.79 in) C/30 anti-aircraft gun. The boat had a complement of forty-eight.

== Service history ==
U-110's keel was laid down 1 February 1940 by DeSchiMAG AG Weser, of Bremen, Germany as yard number 973. She was launched on 25 August 1940 and commissioned on 21 November with Kapitänleutnant Fritz-Julius Lemp in command.

The boat was part of the 2nd U-boat Flotilla from her commissioning date until her loss. Lemp commanded U-110 for her entire career. In an earlier boat (U-30), he was responsible for the sinking of the passenger liner SS Athenia on the first day of the war. The circumstances were such that he was considered for court-martial. He continued, however, to be one of the most successful and rebellious commanders of his day.

== Operational career ==
=== First patrol ===
U-110 set out on her first patrol from Kiel on 9 March 1941. Her route to the Atlantic Ocean took her through the gap between the Faroe and Shetland Islands. Her first victim was Erodona which she damaged south of Iceland on 16 March. She also damaged Siremalm on the 23rd. This ship only escaped after she was hit by a torpedo which failed to detonate, (although it left a large dent) and the U-boat's 105 mm deck gun crew forgot to remove the tampion in the muzzle before engaging their target. The resulting explosion on firing the first round wounded three men and compelled the boat to fire on the merchantman with the smaller 37 and 20 mm armament. Despite being hit, Siremalm successfully fled the scene, zig-zagging as she went.

U-110 arrived in Lorient on the French Atlantic coast on 29 March, having cut the patrol short due to damage from the exploding gun.

=== Second patrol and capture ===
The boat departed Lorient on 15 April 1941. On the 27th, she sank Henri Mory about 330 nautical miles (610 km; 380 mi) west northwest of Blasket Islands, Ireland.

Her next quarry were the ships of convoy OB 318 east of Cape Farewell (Greenland). She successfully attacked and sank Esmond and Bengore Head, but the escort vessels responded. The British corvette HMS Aubrietia located the U-boat with ASDIC (sonar). Aubrietia and British destroyer Broadway then proceeded to drop depth charges, forcing U-110 to surface.

=== Operation Primrose (9 May 1941) ===
U-110 survived the attack, but was seriously damaged. HMS Bulldog and Broadway remained in contact after Aubrietia's last attack. Broadway shaped course to ram, but fired two depth charges beneath the U-boat instead, in an endeavour to make the crew abandon ship before scuttling her. Lemp announced "Last stop, everybody out", meaning "Abandon ship". As the crew turned out onto the U-boat's deck they came under fire from Bulldog and Broadway with casualties from gunfire and drowning. The British had believed that the German deck gun was to be used and ceased fire when they realised that the U-boat was being abandoned and the crew wanted to surrender.

Lemp realised that U-110 was not sinking and attempted to swim back to it to destroy the secret material, and was never seen again. A German eyewitness testified that he was shot in the water by a British sailor, but his fate is not confirmed. Including Lemp, 15 men were killed in the action, and 32 were captured. Radio Officer Georg Högel and the rest of the crew were held at Camp 23 (Monteith POW camp at Iroquois Falls, Northern Ontario, Canada), which is now the Monteith Correctional Complex.

Bulldog's boarding party, led by Sub-Lieutenant David Balme, got onto U-110 and stripped it of everything portable, including her Kurzsignale code book and Enigma machine. William Stewart Pollock, a former radio operator in the Royal Navy and on loan to Bulldog, was on the second boat to board U-110. He retrieved the Enigma machine and books as they looked out of place in the radio room. U-110 was taken in tow back toward Britain, but was intentionally sunk en route to prevent its capture from being revealed.

The documents captured from U-110 helped Bletchley Park codebreakers solve Reservehandverfahren, a reserve German hand cipher.

== Wolfpacks ==
U-110 took part in one wolfpack, West (9 May 1941).

== Modern-day connections ==
The 2000 film U-571 was partially inspired by the capture of U-110.

In 2007, the submarine's chronometer was featured on the BBC programme Antiques Roadshow, from Alnwick Castle, in the possession of the grandson of the captain of the ship which captured her.

== Summary of raiding history ==
Date	Ship	Nationality	Tonnage	Fate
16 March 1941	Erodona	United Kingdom	6,207	Damaged
23 March 1941	Siremalm	Norway	2,468	Damaged
27 April 1941	Henri Mory	United Kingdom	2,564	Sunk
9 May 1941	Bengore Head	United Kingdom	2,609	Sunk
9 May 1941	Esmond	United Kingdom	4,976	Sunk

=== Other captured U-boats ===
- U-505
- U-570, later HMS Graph
- U-744
- U-1024

== See also ==
- U-559

== Bibliography ==
- Busch, Rainer; Röll, Hans-Joachim (1999). German U-boat commanders of World War II: a biographical dictionary. Translated by Brooks, Geoffrey. London, Annapolis, Md: Greenhill Books, Naval Institute Press. ISBN 1-55750-186-6.
- Busch, Rainer; Röll, Hans-Joachim (1999). Deutsche U-Boot-Verluste von September 1939 bis Mai 1945 [German U-boat losses from September 1939 to May 1945]. Der U-Boot-Krieg (in German). Vol. IV. Hamburg, Berlin, Bonn: Mittler. ISBN 3-8132-0514-2.
- Gröner, Erich; Jung, Dieter; Maass, Martin (1991). German Warships 1815–1945, U-boats and Mine Warfare Vessels. Vol. 2. Translated by Thomas, Keith; Magowan, Rachel. London: Conway Maritime Press. ISBN 0-85177-593-4.
- Hugh Sebag-Montefiore, Enigma: The Battle for the Code, 2000, ISBN 0-7538-1130-8.
