= HMS Bulldog (H91) =

British B-class destroyer

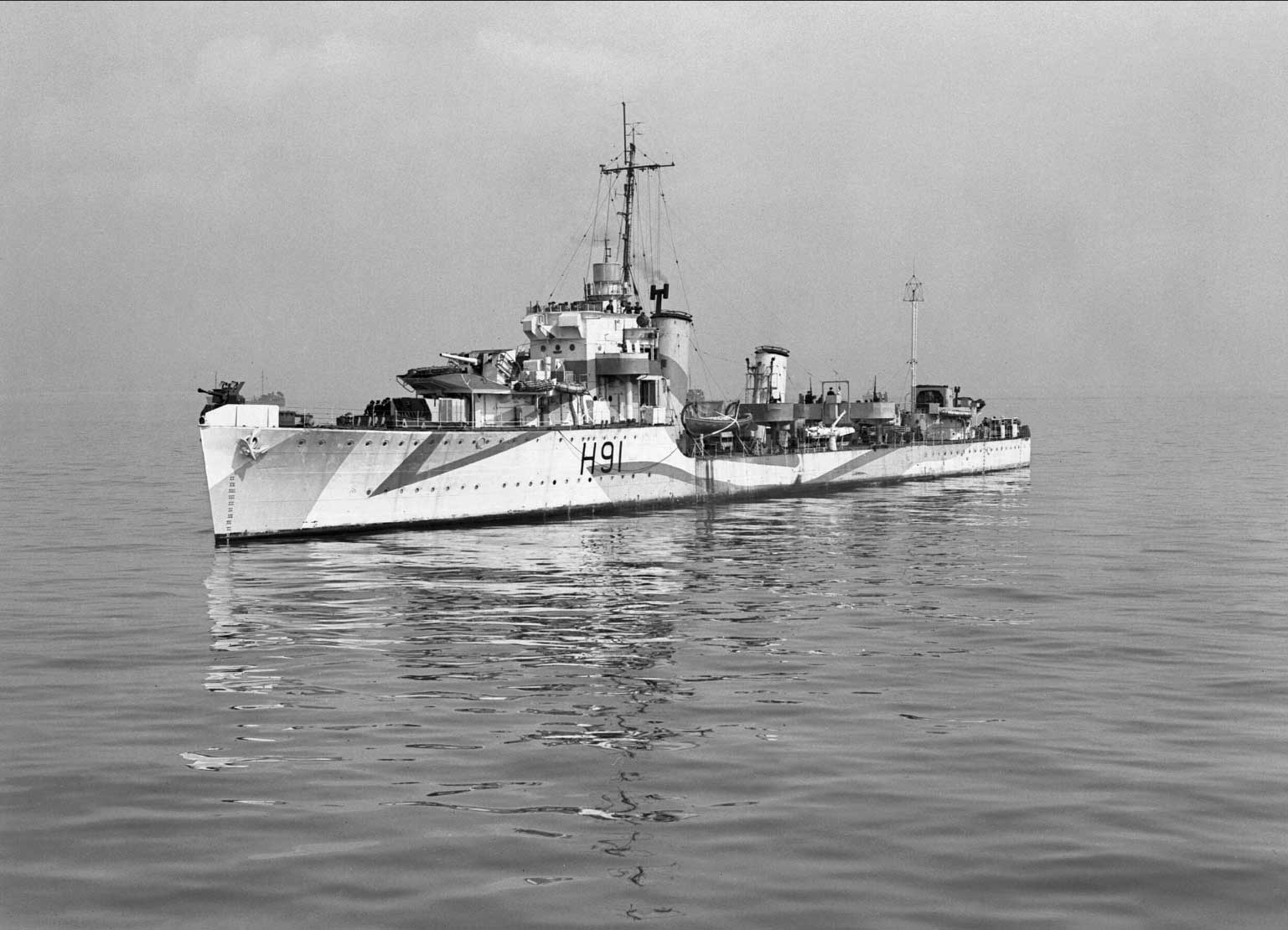
- Bulldog moored to a buoy on the East Coast, 17 April 1945

History

United Kingdom
- Name: Bulldog
- Namesake: Bulldog
- Ordered: 22 March 1929
- Builder: Swan, Hunter & Wigham Richardson Ltd, Wallsend, United Kingdom
- Yard number: 1411
- Laid down: 10 August 1929
- Launched: 6 December 1930
- Completed: 8 April 1931
- Decommissioned: 27 May 1945
- Identification: Pennant number: H91
- Fate: Sold for scrap, 22 December 1945

General characteristics (as completed)
- Class & type: B-class destroyer
- Displacement: 1,360 long tons (1,380 t) (standard)
- Length: 323 ft (98.5 m) (o/a)
- Beam: 32 ft 3 in (9.8 m)
- Draught: 12 ft 3 in (3.7 m)
- Installed power: 3 × Admiralty 3-drum boilers; 34,000 shp (25,000 kW)
- Propulsion: 2 × shafts; 2 × geared steam turbines
- Speed: 35 knots (65 km/h; 40 mph)
- Range: 4,800 nmi (8,900 km; 5,500 mi) at 15 knots (28 km/h; 17 mph)
- Complement: 142 (wartime)
- Sensors & processing systems: Type 119 ASDIC
- Armament: 4 × single 4.7 in (120 mm) guns; 2 × single 2 pdr (40 mm (1.6 in)) AA guns; 2 × quadruple 21 in (533 mm) torpedo tubes; 1 × depth charge rail and 2 throwers; 20 × depth charges

HMS Bulldog (H91) was a B-class destroyer built for the Royal Navy (RN) between 1929 and 1931. Initially assigned to the Mediterranean Fleet, she transferred to the Home Fleet in 1936. During the Spanish Civil War of 1936–1939, the ship spent considerable time in Spanish waters, enforcing the arms blockade imposed by Britain and France on both sides of the conflict. Bulldog saw service throughout World War II on convoy escort duty during the Battle of the Atlantic and in the Arctic. Her most notable actions were the capture of an Enigma machine and codebooks from the U-110 in 1941, sinking another German submarine in 1944 and taking the surrender of the German garrisons on the Channel Islands on 9 May 1945. Surplus after the war, she was broken up for scrap in 1946.

== Description ==
Bulldog displaced 1,360 long tons (1,380 t) at (standard load) and 1,790 long tons (1,820 t) at deep load. The ship had an overall length of 323 feet (98.5 m), a beam of 32 feet 3 inches (9.8 m) and a draught of 12 feet 3 inches (3.7 m). She was powered by Parsons geared steam turbines, driving two shafts, which developed a total of 34,000 shaft horsepower (25,000 kW) giving a maximum speed of 35 knots (65 km/h; 40 mph). Steam for the turbines was provided by three Admiralty 3-drum boilers. With a maximum of 390 long tons (400 t) of fuel oil she had a range of 4,800 nautical miles (8,900 km; 5,500 mi) at 15 knots (28 km/h; 17 mph). Ship's complement was 134 officers and enlisted, increasing to 142 during wartime.

She mounted four quick-firing (QF) 4.7-inch Mk IX guns in single mounts, designated 'A', 'B', 'X', and 'Y' from front to rear. She was briefly fitted with a C XIII mount capable of 60-degree elevation for testing. Anti-Aircraft (AA) defence consisted of two 40-millimetre (1.6 in) QF 2-pounder Mk II AA guns on a platform between her funnels. She was fitted with two above-water quadruple torpedo tube mounts for 21-inch (533 mm) torpedoes. One depth charge rail, two throwers and 20 depth charges were originally carried, this increased to 35 shortly after the war began. The ship was fitted with a Type 119 ASDIC set to detect submarines through sound waves that would reflect off the submarine.

By April 1941, the ship's AA armament was increased when a 3-inch (12-pounder) AA gun, replaced the rear torpedo tubes. In late 1941, the ship was converted to an escort destroyer by replacing her 'A' gun with a Hedgehog anti-submarine mortar. By April 1943, her 'Y' gun had been removed for an increase to 70 depth charges. Additional depth charge stowage later replaced the 12-pounder. (Note: The available sources are contradictory regarding the date of her conversion to an escort destroyer, a term not adopted by the RN until April 1943, at which time Bulldog was listed as such. However, Friedman and English say that she was "rearmed as an escort destroyer during her November 1943 – May 1944 refit", without specifying the changes made in the armament during the refit. Bulldog, was one of the first three destroyers in the RN to receive Hedgehog in late 1941 and had only two 4.7-inch guns by April 1943, which explains why she was listed as an escort destroyer at that time.) The 2-pounder mounts were replaced by Oerlikon 20 mm cannons with two more later added to the forward superstructure. To combat German E-boats, a QF 6-pounder gun was mounted on the bow in 1944.

== Construction and service ==
The ship was ordered on 22 March 1929 from Swan Hunter at Wallsend, under the 1928 Naval Programme. She was laid down on 10 August 1929, and launched on 6 December 1930, as the sixth RN ship to carry this name. Bulldog was completed on 8 April 1931 at a cost of £221,408, excluding items supplied by the Admiralty such as guns, ammunition and communications equipment. After her commissioning, she was assigned to the 4th Destroyer Flotilla with the Mediterranean Fleet until September 1936, when she was transferred to the Home Fleet. Bulldog aided survivors of the 1932 Ierissos earthquake and patrolled southern Spanish waters during the first month of the Spanish Civil War. During her time in the Mediterranean, the ship was refitted at Gibraltar in 1932 and 1935 and in Malta in 1936.

Once she returned to Britain, Bulldog was almost continuously under repair or refitting at Chatham Dockyard until 9 January 1937. She remained with the 4th Flotilla until January 1939 and made multiple deployments off the coast of Spain enforcing the arms embargo until 31 March 1938, when she was refitted, at Sheerness Dockyard. The ship escorted the battleship Resolution to Scapa Flow in September during the Munich Crisis. Bulldog was briefly assigned to the Gibraltar Local Flotilla in January 1939, until she became plane guard for the aircraft carrier Glorious in the Mediterranean in March.

In October she was deployed with Glorious, the battleship Malaya and the destroyer Daring as part of a Hunting Group in the Indian Ocean, based at Socotra. She sailed to Malta with Glorious in January 1940 to refit, returning to plane guard duty for Ark Royal during March. In April Bulldog had repairs made to her feed water heater at Devonport, that lasted until 3 May. Bulldog joined the Home Fleet at Scapa Flow and sailed on 9 May, with a force consisting of the cruiser Birmingham and thirteen destroyers, to search off the mouth of the Skagerrak for German minelayers. The British force was spotted by German E-boats but the German ships returned to base before they could be intercepted. One of the E-boats torpedoed the destroyer Kelly the next day causing serious damage. Bulldog towed Kelly to Hebburn for repairs, sustaining damage to her stern during the tow, which was repaired by Swan Hunter from 13 to 21 May.

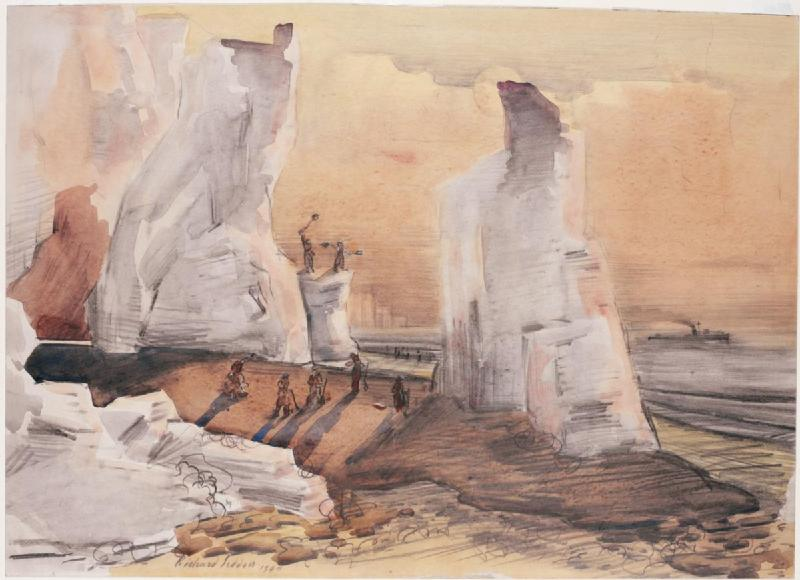
Men signalling Bulldog from shore near Veulettes-sur-Mer, 10 June 1940. Watercolour by Richard Harding Seddon (1915–2002)

The ship damaged her propellers on 27 May and was under repairs at Chatham Dockyard until 4 June, when she was transferred to the 1st Destroyer Flotilla. She sailed for Le Havre, on 9 June, to assist in the evacuation of British troops during Operation Cycle and was severely damaged by three hits from German aircraft that knocked out her steering gear. Bulldog's crew was able to effect temporary repairs and she reached Portsmouth Dockyard the following morning. Whilst under repair, she was further damaged by splinters during an air raid on 24 August. After her repairs were completed on 2 September, Bulldog rejoined the flotilla.

She was refitted at Cammell Laird from 2 January to 18 February 1941 and was assigned to the 3rd Escort Group for convoy escort duties to and from Iceland. Commander Joe Baker-Cresswell was the ship's captain and commander of the group. Together with the destroyer Amazon and the sloop Rochester, she damaged U-94 on 7 May, while escorting Convoy OB 318 off Iceland.

Two days later, the corvette Aubrietia depth-charged U-110, forcing her to the surface. Bulldog and the destroyer Broadway first fired on, then closed on the U-boat, whose crew were abandoning the boat. Sub-Lieutenant David Balme of Bulldog led a boarding party that removed the Enigma coding machine, maps and various codebooks. She took the submarine in tow, but it sank the following morning. Bulldog remained on Atlantic convoy duties until October, when she sailed to Fairfields in Govan, for conversion to an escort destroyer, a process that lasted until February 1942. As part of the conversion, a Type 271 target indication radar was installed above the bridge, replacing her director-control tower and rangefinder. By 1944 a Type 290 short-range surface search radar was fitted.

Bulldog was an unattached ship assigned to Western Approaches Command from 10 February 1942, and aided the destroyer Richmond after she had collided with the American merchant ship SS Francis Scott Key on 31 March whilst escorting Convoy PQ 14 from Oban, Scotland to Reykjavík, Iceland. On 12 April, she rejoined the convoy en route to Murmansk, where they arrived a week later. Beginning on 28 April, she escorted the returning Convoy QP 11 with the same ships. Two days later the light cruiser Edinburgh joined the convoy. Whilst taking position ahead of the convoy later that day, Edinburgh was hit by two torpedoes from U-456. The cruiser, heavily damaged and with her steering gear wrecked, was taken in tow for the voyage back to Murmansk.

On 1 May the convoy was attacked by the German destroyers Z7 Hermann Schoemann, Z24, and Z25 which had been searching for Edinburgh. Commander Maxwell Richmond, Bulldog's captain and commander of the escorts, interposed his four destroyers between the Germans and the merchantmen and drove off the Germans in a three-hour battle during which Bulldog was damaged by shell splinters. She was repaired from 2 June to 14 August, then assigned to the Greenock Special Escort Division. In November she escorted British ships participating in the Allied landings in North Africa, before returning to Greenock for repairs from 23 November to 14 December.

Bulldog was assigned to the escort for Convoy JW 51B on 20 December, but had to return home for weather repairs on 28 December. After repairs were completed on 16 January 1943, she escorted convoys between Iceland and the UK for the next two months. The ship was under repair at Greenock from 29 March to 22 April, after which she sailed to Freetown for escort duties between Lagos, Freetown and Gibraltar. Bulldog returned home in October for a lengthy refit at Portsmouth Dockyard that lasted from 8 November to 24 May 1944. In June she began escort duties between the River Clyde and the Faeroe Islands and sank U-719 with her hedgehog, all 52 hands lost, on the 26 June.

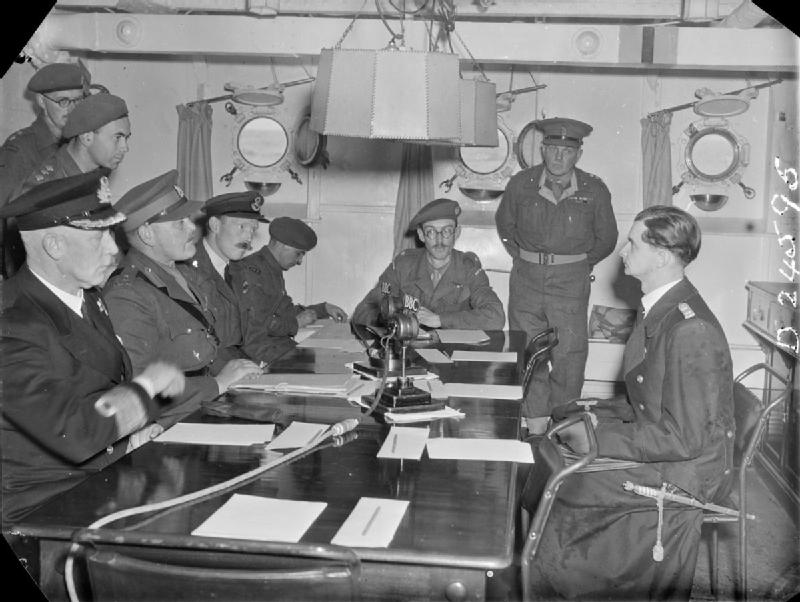
Signing the surrender document liberating the Channel Islands

On 20 August, her hull was badly damaged after a collision with the frigate Loch Dunvegan in Gourock Bay. After repairs at Ardrossan that lasted until 4 September, she resumed convoy duties between the Faeroes, the Clyde and Scapa Flow until she required major machinery repairs in November. Upon completion on 30 January 1945, Bulldog escorted convoys between Plymouth and various Irish ports for the remainder of the war. On 9 May 1945, she sailed to Guernsey where she participated in the Liberation of the German-occupied Channel Islands with German officers surrendering to British representatives on board the ship. Bulldog was placed in Category 'B' reserve on 27 May at Dartmouth, transferred to Rosyth on 27 November and reduced to Category 'C' reserve on 13 December. Approved for scrapping on 22 December, she was turned over to Metal Industries, Limited on 17 January 1946.

=== U-110 and Enigma ===
The Captain of Bulldog realised how important the items recovered from U-110 were, so decided not to send an informative radio message about the capture which avoided the Germans learning of the loss, instead sailing to Iceland and then Scotland with the German prisoners kept isolated. Acquiring an Enigma machine was of some help, but the capture of the code books was of immense help to the Government Code and Cypher School in that the codes were still valid until 30 June 1941 enabling six weeks of unfettered and immediate access to the German naval code, their insight making the breaking of future German naval codes much easier. Sub-Lieutenant Balme, RN received the DSC from King George VI.
