= HMS Aubrietia (K96) =

Flower-class corvette

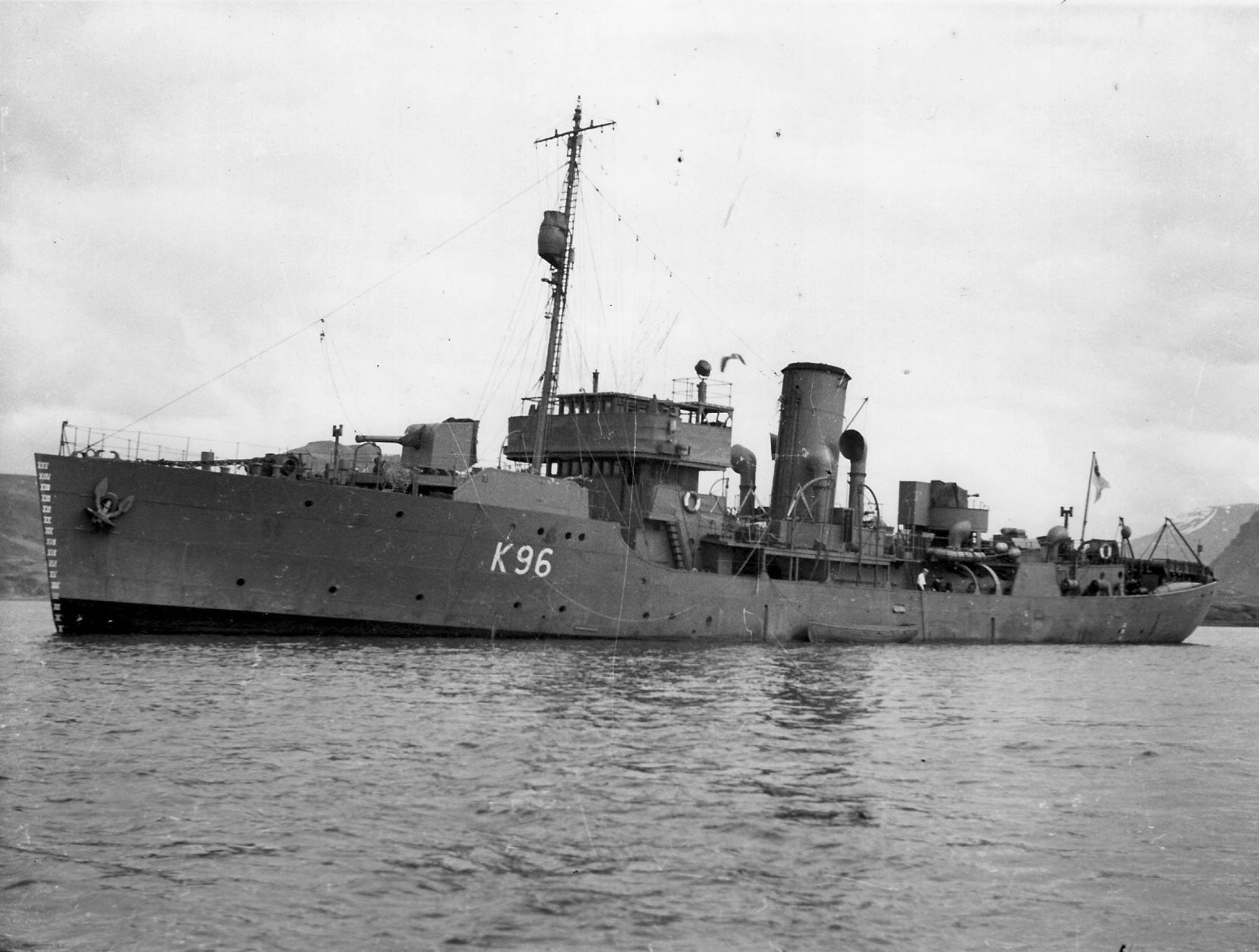
- HMS Aubrietia (K96), 1941

History

United Kingdom
- Name: Aubrietia (Aubretia)
- Builder: George Brown & Co., Greenock
- Laid down: 27 October 1939
- Launched: 5 September 1940
- Commissioned: 23 December 1940
- Decommissioned: 29 July 1946
- Honours and awards: Atlantic 1941-45, North Africa 1942-43, South France 1944 and Mediterranean 1944
- Fate: Sold for scrap in 1966

General characteristics
- Class & type: Flower-class corvette
- Displacement: 940 tons
- Length: 205 ft (62.48 m)
- Beam: 33 ft (10.06 m)
- Draught: 11 ft 6 in (3.51 m)
- Propulsion: Single shaft 2 × fire tube Scotch boilers; 2 screws; 1 × 4-cycle triple-expansion reciprocating steam engine; 2,750 ihp (2,050 kW)
- Speed: 16 knots (29.6 km/h)
- Range: 3,500 nmi (6,482 km) @ 12 kt
- Complement: 85
- Sensors & processing systems: 1 × SW1C or 2C radar, 1× Type 123A or Type 127DV sonar
- Armament: 1 × 4 inch BL Mk.IX single gun, 2 × Vickers .50 machine guns (twin), 2 × .303 inch Lewis machine gun (twin), 2 × Mk.II depth charge throwers, 2 × depth charge rails with 40 depth charges, originally fitted with minesweeping gear, later removed.

HMS Aubrietia (K96) was a Flower-class corvette built for the Royal Navy (RN) from 1941-1946. She was active as a convoy escort in the Atlantic and Mediterranean. In May 1941, Aubrietia sighted and depth charged the German submarine U-110, leading to its capture and the seizure of a German Naval Enigma (enigma machine) and its Kurzsignale code book.

== Design and construction ==
The Flower-class arose as a result of the Royal Navy's realisation in the late 1930s that it had a shortage of escort vessels, particularly coastal escorts for use on the East coast of Britain, as the likelihood of war with Germany increased. To meet this urgent requirement, a design developed based on the whale-catcher Southern Pride - this design was much more capable than Naval trawlers, but cheaper and quicker to build than the Hunt-class destroyers or Kingfisher-class sloops that were alternatives for the coastal escort role.

The early Flowers, such as Aubrietia were 205 feet 0 inches (62.48 m) long overall, 196 feet 0 inches (59.74 m) at the waterline and 190 feet 0 inches (57.91 m) between perpendiculars. Beam was 33 feet 0 inches (10.06 m) and draught was 14 feet 10 inches (4.52 m) aft. Displacement was about 940 long tons (960 t) standard and 1,170 long tons (1,190 t) full load. Two Admiralty Three-drum water tube boilers fed steam to a Vertical Triple Expansion Engine rated at 2,750 indicated horsepower (2,050 kW) which drove a single propeller shaft. This gave a speed of 16 knots (18 mph; 30 km/h). 200 tons of oil were carried, giving a range of 4,000 nautical miles (4,600 mi; 7,400 km) at 12 knots (14 mph; 22 km/h).

Design armament was a single BL 4-inch Mk IX naval gun forward and a single 2-pounder "pom-pom" anti-aircraft cannon aft, although the pom-poms were not available until 1941, so early Flowers such as Aubrietia were completed with improvised close-range anti aircraft armament such as Lewis guns or Vickers .50 machine guns instead.

Aubrietia formed part of the initial 26-ship order for Flower-class corvettes placed on 25 July 1939 under the 1939/40 Naval estimates. She was laid down at George Brown & Co's, Greenock shipyard on 27 October 1939, was launched on 5 September 1940 and completed on 23 December 1940.

== Service history ==
In November 1941 she was adopted by the civil community of Horsforth, Yorkshire which raised £241,000 following a warship week National Savings Campaign. This was over twice the target figure of £120,000.

In 2000 the US President Bill Clinton acknowledged Horsforth's contribution to the war effort in a letter sent to MP Paul Truswell. The letter is in Horsforth Museum.

From 1941 to 1944, Aubrietia saw service on convoy escort duty in the Battle of the Atlantic, the Mediterranean and North Africa.

=== Royal Navy ===
Between 12 January 1941 and 13 April 1945, Aubrietia escorted 85 convoys.

In 1941, Aubrietia was part of the Atlantic convoy 3rd Escort Group operating out of the port of Greenock.

On 9 May 1941, Aubrietia was on escort duty as part of Convoy OB 318. Aubrietia picked up one crew member from the SS Esmond, which had been torpedoed by the German submarine U-110. On the same day, she spotted the periscope of the U-110 and depth charged it, forcing the submarine to surface. This led to the capture of a complete Enigma machine and its codebooks by a boarding party from HMS Bulldog.

After February 1942, she moved to support convoys on the Atlantic run between Freetown, Sierra Leone and Liverpool. On 30 March 1942, Aubrietia picked up some of the survivors from the British merchant ship Muncaster Castle, which was torpedoed and sunk south-south-west of Monrovia, Liberia.

In November 1942, she was deployed as an escort for assault convoys in the Mediterranean as support of planned allied landings in North Africa (Operation Torch).

From March 1943, Aubrietia convoys was redeployed for defence of convoys during Atlantic passage between Liverpool and Freetown until May 1944. In June 1943, she was transferred to the 41st Escort Group in this role.

In May 1944, Aubrietia was deployed at Gibraltar for patrol and convoy defence of convoys operating between the Mediterranean and Liverpool. On 15 May 1944, Together with HMS Kilmarnock and HMS Blackfly, Aubrietia took part in depth charge and hedgehog attacks on the German submarine U-731 in the Strait of Gibraltar which was sunk with no survivors.

In June 1944, Aubrietia joined the TG 80.6 Antisubmarine and Convoy Control Group during planned landings in South France and came under US Navy command. In November 1944, she returned to Royal Navy control and continued as an escort for Atlantic convoys between Freetown, the Mediterranean and Liverpool, until April 1945.

=== Fate ===
Following VE day, Aubrietia was placed on the Disposal List and was sold in 1948 to Kosmos, a Norwegian company, for use as a mercantile buoy tender. Aubrietia was renamed Arnfinn Bergan. Arnfinn Bergan was converted to a whale catcher in 1951, and remained in service until laid up in Sandjeford, Norway and was scrapped in Grimstad, Norway in December 1966.

== Sources ==
- Elliott, Peter (1977). Allied Escort Ships of World War II: A complete survey. London: Macdonald and Jane's Publishers. ISBN 0-356-08401-9.
- Friedman, Norman (2008). British Destroyers and Frigates: The Second World War and After. Barnsley, UK: Seaforth Publishing. ISBN 978-1-84832-015-4.
- Lambert, John; Brown, Les (2008). Flower-Class Corvettes. St. Catharines, Ontario, Canada: Vanwall Publishing. ISBN 978-1-55068-986-0.
- Rohwer, Jürgen; Hümmelchen, Gerhard (1992). Chronology of the War at Sea 1939–1945. London: Greenhill Books. ISBN 1-85367-117-7.
