= List of shipwrecks in September 1939 =

The list of shipwrecks in September 1939 includes ships sunk, foundered, grounded, or otherwise lost during September 1939.

== 1 September ==
List of shipwrecks: 1 September 1939
Ship	State	Description
ORP Mazur	Polish Navy	World War II: The gunnery training vessel was bombed and sunk at Oksywie by Junkers Ju 87 aircraft of IV Staffeln, Lehrgeschwader 1, Luftwaffe with the loss of about 40 crew.
ORP Nurek	Polish Navy	World War II: The dive support vessel was bombed and sunk at Oksywie by Junkers Ju 87 aircraft of IV Staffeln, Lehrgeschwader 1, Luftwaffe. There were 17 dead and 6 survivors.
ORP Ślązak	Polish Navy	World War II: The A51-class torpedo boat was scuttled. She was later salvaged by the Germans, repaired and put in service as Panther.
Tiger Hill	Panama	The steamship, carrying between 1,100 and 1,500 Jewish refugees, was grounded on a beach at Tel Aviv, Palestine, after an attack by British forces killed two of her passengers. The remaining refugees came ashore and were interned.

== 2 September ==
List of shipwrecks: 2 September 1939
Ship	State	Description
ORP Gdańsk	Polish Navy	World War II: The auxiliary ship was bombed and sunk in the Baltic Sea off Gdańsk by Junkers Ju 87 aircraft of IV Staffeln, Lehrgeschwader 1, Luftwaffe. One crew member was killed.
ORP Gdynia	Polish Navy	World War II: The auxiliary ship was bombed and sunk in the Baltic Sea off Gdańsk by Junkers Ju 87 aircraft of IV Staffeln, Lehrgeschwader 1, Luftwaffe. Between 35 and 40 lives were lost.
USS Pigeon	United States Navy	USS Pigeon aground at Tsingtao The submarine rescue vessel was driven ashore in a typhoon at Tsingtao, China. She was later refloated and returned to service.

== 3 September ==
List of shipwrecks: 3 September 1939
Ship	State	Description
Athenia	United Kingdom	World War II: The passenger ship was torpedoed and sunk in the Atlantic Ocean 250 nautical miles (460 km) off the coast of Northern Ireland (56°44′N 14°05′W) by U-30 (Kriegsmarine) with the loss of 117 of the 1,418 people on board. Survivors were rescued by HMS Electra, HMS Escort (both Royal Navy), City of Flint (United States), Knute Nelson (Norway) and Southern Cross (Sweden).
ORP General Haller	Polish Navy	World War II: The Filin-class guard ship was severely damaged at Hel by Heinkel He 59 aircraft of the Luftwaffe. She was abandoned by her crew and her weapons were removed for use in ground defense. German bombers finally sank her on 6 September.
ORP Gryf	Polish Navy	World War II: The minelayer was bombed and sunk at Hel by Luftwaffe aircraft after engaging the destroyers Z1 Leberecht Maass and Z9 Wolfgang Zenker (both Kriegsmarine). Six Polish sailors were killed by German shells and two more by the air attack. Another died of wounds.
ORP Lloyd Bydgoski II	Polish Navy	World War II: The picket boat, was sunk in the Baltic Sea off Hel (54°35′N 19°08′E) by gunfire from S-23 (Kriegsmarine). The whole crew was allowed to take to their lifeboat before the attack.
ORP Mewa	Polish Navy	World War II: The minesweeper was bombed and sunk at Hel by Luftwaffe aircraft.
Olinda	Germany	World War II: the cargo ship was intercepted by HMS Ajax (Royal Navy) in the South Atlantic, off the coast of Uruguay (33°30′S 53°30′W) and sunk by Ajax as no prize crew was available.
ORP Wicher	Polish Navy	World War II: The Wicher-class destroyer was bombed and sunk at Hel by Luftwaffe aircraft with the loss of one crew member.

== 4 September ==
List of shipwrecks: 4 September 1939
Ship	State	Description
Carl Fritzen	Germany	World War II: The cargo ship was intercepted in the South Atlantic off Montevideo, Uruguay (34°19′S 48°29′W) by HMS Ajax (Royal Navy) and scuttled because no prize crew was available.
Imanta	Latvia	World War II: The cargo ship struck a mine and sank in the Baltic Sea off Malmö, Sweden with the loss of all 22 crew.
Johannes Molkenbuhr	Germany	World War II: The cargo ship (5,294 GRT) was intercepted in the Norwegian Sea 17 nautical miles (31 km) off Stadlandet, Norway (61°40′N 3°51′E) by HMS Southampton (Royal Navy) and was scuttled by her crew. All 38 crew and 4 passengers were rescued by HMS Jervis (Royal Navy), while HMS Jersey (Royal Navy) shelled and sank Johannes Molkenbuhr.
Kosti	Greece	World War II: The cargo ship struck a mine in the Øresund, Sweden and sank. All 29 crew were rescued by Poseidon (Finland).
ORP Krakowiak	Polish Navy	World War II: The A-class torpedo boat was scuttled off Danzig, Germany.
ORP Kujawiak	Polish Navy	World War II: A-class torpedo boat was scuttled off Danzig.
Lianne	Germany	World War II: The auxiliary schooner struck a mine in the North Sea and sank with the loss of all five hands. (Look 07/09/1939)
Nordstrand	Denmark	World War II: The fishing trawler struck a mine and sank in the North Sea 70 nautical miles (130 km) west of the Horn Reef Lighthouse. All four crew were killed.

== 5 September ==
List of shipwrecks: 5 September 1939
Ship	State	Description
Bosnia	United Kingdom	World War II: The cargo ship (2,407 GRT) was torpedoed and sunk in the Atlantic Ocean 120 nautical miles (220 km) north north west of Cape Ortegal, Spain (45°29′N 9°45′W) by U-47 (Kriegsmarine) with the loss of one of her 37 crew. Survivors were rescued by Eidanger (Norway).
Inn	Germany	World War II: The cargo ship was captured in the Atlantic Ocean 400 nautical miles (740 km) south west of the Canary Islands, Spain by HMS Neptune (Royal Navy) and was scuttled.
Royal Sceptre	United Kingdom	World War II: The cargo ship (4,853 GRT) was shelled, torpedoed and sunk in the Atlantic Ocean north of Cape Finisterre, Spain (46°23′N 14°59′W) by U-48 (Kriegsmarine) with the loss of one of her 33 crew. The survivors were rescued by Browning (United Kingdom).

== 6 September ==
List of shipwrecks: 6 September 1939
Ship	State	Description
Manaar	United Kingdom	World War II: The cargo ship was sunk in the Atlantic Ocean off Cape Roca, Portugal (42°01′N 14°38′W by U-38 (Kriegsmarine) with the loss of seven of her 62 crew. Survivors were rescued by Carvalho Araujo (Portugal), Castelbianco (Italy) and Mars (Netherlands).
Rio Claro	United Kingdom	World War II: The cargo ship was torpedoed, shelled and sunk in the Atlantic Ocean southwest of Cape Finisterre, Spain (50°27′N 13°45′W) by U-47 (Kriegsmarine). All 41 crew were rescued by Stad Maastricht (Netherlands).
Sutwik	United States	The motor towing vessel was destroyed in the Bering Sea off Sedge Island off the west-central coast of the Territory of Alaska by a fire that began when one of her gasoline engines backfired. Her two-man crew jumped overboard and survived.

== 7 September ==
List of shipwrecks: 7 September 1939
Ship	State	Description
Gartavon	United Kingdom	World War II: The cargo ship was shelled and sunk in the Atlantic Ocean 260 nautical miles (480 km) west north west of Cape Finisterre, Spain (47°04′N 11°32′W) by U-47 (Kriegsmarine). All 22 crew were rescued by Castor (Sweden).
Lianne	Germany	World War II: The coaster struck a mine and sank in the Baltic Sea off the island Møn.
Olivegrove	United Kingdom	World War II: The cargo ship (4,060 GRT) was torpedoed and sunk in the Atlantic Ocean 300 nautical miles (560 km) north west of Spain (49°05′N 15°58′W) by U-33 (Kriegsmarine). All crew were ordered into the lifeboats before the ship was sunk. They were rescued by Washington (United States).
Pukkastan	United Kingdom	World War II: The cargo ship was captured in the Atlantic Ocean south west of Land's End, Cornwall (49°23′N 7°49′W) by U-34 (Kriegsmarine). Her 35 crew were ordered into the lifeboats before the ship was torpedoed, shelled and sunk. The crew were rescued by Bilderdijk (Netherlands).
Vegesack	Germany	The cargo ship (4,061 GRT) ran aground at Midtfjøra, Tananger, Norway and was a total loss. All 64 crew and a part if the cargo were saved.

== 8 September ==
List of shipwrecks: 8 September 1939
Ship	State	Description
Cape Ortegal	United Kingdom	World War II: The Admiralty-requisitioned cargo ship (4,896 GRT) was scuttled in Skerry Sound, Scapa Flow as a blockship. It didn’t last long as a block ship because it wasn’t ballasted when it was sunk, so it quickly rolled over and broke up during the first storms of the winter of 1939–1940.
Helfrid Bissmark	Germany	World War II: The coaster (718 GRT) struck a German mine and sank in the Skagerrak (55°5′N 12°20′E). Eight of her 15 crew were killed.
Helga Schroder	Germany	World War II: The coaster (656 GRT) struck a mine and sank off Marstal in the Baltic Sea.
Kennebec	United Kingdom	World War II: The cargo ship (5,548 GRT) was stopped in the Atlantic Ocean south west of Land's End, Cornwall (49°18′N 8°13′W) by U-34 (Kriegsmarine), abandonned by her crew and then cut in two by a torpedo. All 22 crew were rescued by Breedijk (Netherlands). Parts of the wreck were sunk by gunfire the next day by HMS Verity (Royal Navy).
Olivebank	Finland	World War II: The barque (2,824 GRT) struck a mine and sank in the North Sea off Jutland 55°53′N 5°07′E with the loss of 14 of her 21 crew. The seven survivors clung to the wreck for 42 hours before being rescued by Tallona (Denmark).
Regent Tiger	United Kingdom	World War II: The tanker (10,176 GRT) was stopped in the Atlantic Ocean 250 nautical miles (460 km) west south west of Cape Clear Island, County Cork, Ireland (49°57′N 15°34′W) by U-29 (Kriegsmarine) and then torpedoed and set on fire after all 41 crew and 3 passengers has left her. They were rescued by Jean Jadot (Belgium). The wreck foundered on 10 September at 49°48′N 14°33′W.
HNLMS Willem van Ewijck	Royal Netherlands Navy	World War II: The Jan van Amstel-class minesweeper (400 GRT) struck a Dutch mine and sank in the North Sea off Terschelling, Friesland. 26 of her 51 crew disappeared with her, and four survivors died of their wounds, bringing the total of dead to 30.
Winkleigh	United Kingdom	World War II: The cargo ship (5,055 GRT) was stopped in the Atlantic Ocean 500 nautical miles (930 km) west of Ouessant, Finistère, France (48°06′N 18°12′W) by U-48 (Kriegsmarine) and then sunk by a torpedo after all 37 crew had abandoned her. They were rescued by Statendam (Netherlands).

== 9 September ==
List of shipwrecks: 9 September 1939
Ship	State	Description
Asni	France	The cargo ship was wrecked on Itu Aba Island, Spratly Islands.
Mark	Netherlands	World War II: The cargo ship struck a mine and sank in the North Sea 120 nautical miles (220 km) south west of Vorupør, Denmark (56°45′N 4°04′E). There were no casualties.
ORP Nieuchwytny	Polish Navy	World War II: The river monitor was scuttled to avoid capture. She was later raised, repaired and put into German service as Pionier.

== 10 September ==
List of shipwrecks: 10 September 1939
Ship	State	Description
Goodwood	United Kingdom	World War II: The cargo ship struck a mine and sank in the North Sea off Bridlington, Yorkshire (54°06′N 0°03′W) with the loss of one of her 24 crew.
Magdapur	United Kingdom	World War II: The cargo ship struck a mine and sank in the North Sea off Aldeburgh, Suffolk (52°11′N 1°43′E) with the loss of six of her 81 crew. Survivors were rescued by the Aldeburgh lifeboat Abdy Beauclerk ( Royal National Lifeboat Institution) and other vessels.
HMS Oxley	Royal Navy	World War II: The Odin-class submarine (1,350 GRT) was torpedoed and sunk in the North Sea off Stavanger, Norway (58°30′N 5°30′E) by HMS Triton (Royal Navy) with the loss of 53 of her 55 crew.

== 11 September ==
List of shipwrecks: 11 September 1939
Ship	State	Description
Blairlogie	United Kingdom	World War II: The cargo ship was torpedoed and sunk in the Atlantic Ocean west of County Donegal, Ireland (54°59′N 15°08′W) by U-30 (Kriegsmarine). All 30 crew were rescued by American Shipper (United States).
Brendonia	United Kingdom	The coaster collided with another ship in The Downs, off the east coast of Kent, and sank.
Firby	United Kingdom	World War II: The cargo ship (4,869 GRT) was torpedoed, shelled and sunk in the Atlantic Ocean 300 nautical miles (560 km) west north west of Cape Wrath, Sutherland (59°40′N 13°50′W) by U-48 (Kriegsmarine). All 34 crew were rescued by HMS Fearless (Royal Navy).
Inverliffey	United Kingdom	World War II: The cargo ship was torpedoed, shelled and sunk in the Atlantic Ocean 270 nautical miles (500 km) west south west of Land's End, Cornwall (48°18′00″N 11°24′30″W) by U-38 (Kriegsmarine). Her 49 crew were rescued by R. G. Stewart (United States).

== 12 September ==
List of shipwrecks: 12 September 1939
Ship	State	Description
Wellvale	United Kingdom	World War II: The 125.7-foot (38.3 m) steam trawler (290 GRT), a sold off TR series minesweeping trawler, was officially missing as of this date. One source says the vessel was shelled and sunk by U-boat, another source says U-35 (Kriegsmarine) was in the area but made no claim of a sinking. The ship was lost with all 12 hands.

== 13 September ==
List of shipwrecks: 13 September 1939
Ship	State	Description
Charcot	French Navy	World War II: The auxiliary minesweeper was damaged beyond repair by the explosion of Pluton (French Navy) at Casablanca, Morocco.
Chellah	French Navy	World War II: The auxiliary minesweeper was damaged beyond repair by the explosion of Pluton (French Navy) at Casablanca.
Davara	United Kingdom	World War II: The 130-foot (40 m), 291-ton steam trawler was shelled and sunk by in the Atlantic Ocean 21 nautical miles (39 km) west north west of Tory Island, County Donegal, Ireland (55°31′15″N 8°37′57″W) by U-27 (Kriegsmarine). Her crew were rescued by Willowpool (United Kingdom).
Etoile du Matin	France	World War II: The trawler was sunk by the explosion of Pluton (French Navy) at Casablanca.
Gosse	French Navy	World War II: The auxiliary minesweeper was damaged beyond repair by the explosion of Pluton (French Navy) at Casablanca.
Katingo Hajipatera	Greece	World War II: The cargo ship struck a mine and was grounded off Falsterbo, Sweden. She was refloated later that day and proceeded to Copenhagen, Denmark under escort from a Royal Swedish Navy minesweeper.
Marie Merveilleuse	France	World War II: The trawler was sunk by the explosion of Pluton (French Navy) at Casablanca.
Neptunia	United Kingdom	World War II: The tug was torpedoed, shelled and sunk in the Atlantic Ocean south west of Ireland (49°20′N 14°40′W) by U-29 (Kriegsmarine). Her crew were rescued by Brinkburn (United Kingdom).
Pluton	French Navy	World War II: The minelaying cruiser was sunk by an explosion whilst unloading mines at Casablanca. About 200 of her 424 crew were killed.
Ronda	Norway	World War II: The cargo liner (5,136 GRT) struck a mine and sank in the North Sea off Terschelling, Friesland, Netherlands (54°10′N 4°34′E) with the loss of 17 of the 37 people aboard (14 crew and 3 passengers). The 20 survivors (16 crew and 4 passengers) were rescued by Provvidenza (Italy).
Stolp	Germany	The trawler collided with the torpedo boat Luchs (Kriegsmarine) in the North Sea and sank.
Sultan	France	World War II: The trawler was sunk by the explosion of Pluton (French Navy) at Casablanca.

== 14 September ==
List of shipwrecks: 14 September 1939
Ship	State	Description
British Influence	United Kingdom	World War II: The tanker was torpedoed, shelled and sunk in the Atlantic Ocean south west of Ireland (49°43′N 12°49′W) by U-29 (Kriegsmarine). The survivors were rescued by Ida Bakke (Norway).
ORP Czapla	Polish Navy	World War II: The minesweeper was sunk at Jastarnia by aircraft of 4. Trägergeschwader 186, Luftwaffe.
Fanad Head	United Kingdom	World War II: The cargo ship was captured 280 nautical miles (520 km) west north west of Malin Head, County Donegal, Ireland by U-30 (Kriegsmarine) and scuttled (56°43′N 15°21′W). Survivors were rescued by HMS Tartar (Royal Navy).
Hawarden Castle	United Kingdom	World War II: The coaster (210 GRT) struck a mine laid by U-17 (Kriegsmarine) and sank in the North Sea east of South Foreland, Kent (51°07′N 1°27′E) with the loss of all six crew.
ORP Jaskółka	Polish Navy	World War II: The Jaskółka-class minesweeper was bombed and sunk at Jastarnia by Junkers Ju 87 aircraft of 4. Trägergeschwader 186, Luftwaffe.
ORP Lech	Polish Navy	World War II: The tug was bombed and sunk at Jastarnia by aircraft of 4. Trägergeschwader 186, Luftwaffe.
ORP Pomorzanin	Polish Navy	World War II: The minesweeper was bombed and sunk at Jastarnia by aircraft of 4. Trägergeschwader 186, Luftwaffe.
U-39	Kriegsmarine	World War II: The Type IXA submarine was depth charged and sunk in the Atlantic Ocean off Rockall, Inverness-shire (58°32′N 11°49′W) by HMS Faulknor, HMS Firedrake and HMS Foxhound (all Royal Navy). She was the first U-boat lost to enemy action during the war. All 42 crew were rescued by HMS Faulknor.
Vancouver City	United Kingdom	World War II: The cargo ship (4,955 GRT) was torpedoed and sunk in the Celtic Sea south west of Ireland (51°23′N 7°03′W) by U-28 (Kriegsmarine) with the loss of three of her 33 crew. Survivors were rescued by Mamura (Netherlands).

== 15 September ==
List of shipwrecks: 15 September 1939
Ship	State	Description
Alex Van Opstal	Belgium	World War II: The cargo ship struck a mine laid by U-26 (Kriegsmarine) and sank in the English Channel 5 nautical miles (9.3 km) off the Shambles Lightship ( Trinity House) (50°32′N 2°16′W). All 57 people on board were rescued by Atlanticos (Greece).
Cheyenne	United Kingdom	World War II: The cargo ship was torpedoed, shelled and damaged in the Atlantic Ocean 150 nautical miles (280 km) west south west of the Fastnet Rock (50°20′N 13°30′W) by U-53 (Kriegsmarine) with the loss of six of her 43 crew. The survivors were rescued by Ida Bakke (Norway). Cheyenne was declared beyond salvage and scuttled by HMS Mackay (Royal Navy).
Santa Teresinha	Portugal	The 133.5-foot (40.7 m), 285-ton steam trawler was sunk in a collision 30 miles (48 km) north of Cape Roca near Lisbon, Portugal.
Truro	United Kingdom	World War II: The cargo ship was torpedoed, shelled and sunk in the North Sea 130 nautical miles (240 km) east north east of Rattray Head, Aberdeenshire (58°20′N 2°00′E) by U-36 (Kriegsmarine). Twenty survivors were rescued by the trawlers Edwaard van Flaaneren and Nautilus (both Belgium) the next day.

== 16 September ==
List of shipwrecks: 16 September 1939
Ship	State	Description
Arkleside	United Kingdom	World War II: The cargo ship was torpedoed and sunk in the Atlantic Ocean 150 nautical miles (280 km) south west of Land's End, Cornwall (48°00′N 9°30′W) by U-33 (Kriegsmarine). Her crew were rescued by two French fishing vessels.
Aska	United Kingdom	World War II: The cargo liner was bombed and sunk off Rathlin Island, County Donegal, Ireland (55°15′N 6°55′W). Survivors were rescued by HMS Jason (Royal Navy) and local fishing trawlers.
Aviemore	United Kingdom	World War II: Convoy OB 4: The cargo ship was torpedoed and sunk in the Atlantic Ocean 350 nautical miles (650 km) west of Land's End (49°11′N 13°38′W) by U-31 (Kriegsmarine) with the loss of 23 of her 34 crew. Survivors were rescued by HMS Warwick (Royal Navy).
Bramden	United Kingdom	World War II: The cargo ship struck a mine and sank in the North Sea off Dunkerque, Nord, France (51°22′N 2°31′E) with the loss of three crew.
City of Paris	United Kingdom	World War II: The ocean liner (10,902 GRT, 1922) struck a mine that had been laid by U-13 (Kriegsmarine). One person was killed. The ship was repaired and returned to service.
Rudyard Kipling	United Kingdom	World War II: The 138.8-foot (42.3 m), 333-ton steam fishing trawler was captured in the Atlantic Ocean 100 miles (160 km) west of Ireland by U-27 (Kriegsmarine) and was scuttled with explosive charges (53°50′N 11°10′W). U-27 towed her boat to 5 miles off the County Donegal, Ireland coast setting her crew free early the next morning.

== 17 September ==
List of shipwrecks: 17 September 1939
Ship	State	Description
Courageous	Royal Navy	HMS Courageous World War II: The Courageous-class aircraft carrier (22,500/26,990 t, 1916/1928) was torpedoed and sunk in the Atlantic Ocean southwest of Ireland (50°10′N 14°45′W) by U-29 (Kriegsmarine) with the loss of 518 of her 1,259 crew.
Kafiristan	United Kingdom	World War II: The cargo ship was torpedoed and sunk in the Atlantic Ocean 300 nautical miles (560 km) south west of Ireland (50°16′N 16°55′W) by U-53 (Kriegsmarine) with the loss of six of her 35 crew. Survivors were rescued by American Farmer (United States).

== 18 September ==
List of shipwrecks: 18 September 1939
Ship	State	Description
Arlita	United Kingdom	World War II: The 138.7-foot (42.3 m), 326-ton steam trawler, a sold off prototype of the Mersey-class naval trawler, was captured at 58°09′N 09°17′W, then shelled and sunk in the Atlantic Ocean 22 nautical miles (41 km) west north west of St Kilda (57°05′N 09°28′W) by U-35 (Kriegsmarine). Her crew was transferred to the captured Nancy Hague (United Kingdom) which was released to take the crews to Fleetwood.
Henry Endicott	United States	Under tow in heavy seas with a cargo of granite paving blocks, the 192-foot (59 m), 866-gross register ton schooner barge sank in 80 feet (24 m) of water without loss of life 2.25 nautical miles (4.17 km) east-southeast of Manomet Point, Plymouth, Massachusetts, at 41°54′30″N 070°29′08″W.
ORP Horodyszce	Polish Navy	World War II: The Warszawa-class river monitor was scuttled on the Pripyat River to avoid capture. Raised, repaired and put into Soviet service as Bobruysk.
Kensington Court	United Kingdom	World War II: The cargo ship was shelled and sunk in the Atlantic Ocean 100 nautical miles (190 km) south west of the Bishop Rock (50°31′N 8°27′W) by U-32 (Kriegsmarine). Survivors were rescued by Short Sunderland aircraft of 204 and 228 Squadrons, Royal Air Force.
Lord Minto	United Kingdom	World War II: The 136.8-foot (41.7 m), 295-ton steam trawler was captured at (58°09′N 09°17′W), then shelled and sunk in the Atlantic Ocean 30 nautical miles (56 km) northwest of St Kilda (57°51′N 9°28′W) by U-35 (Kriegsmarine). Her crew was transferred to the captured Nancy Hague (United Kingdom) which was released to take the crews to Fleetwood.
ORP Pinsk	Polish Navy	World War II: The Warszawa-class river monitor was scuttled on the Pripyat River to avoid capture. Raised, repaired and put into Soviet service as Zhitomir.
Sola	United Kingdom	World War II: The 123.3-foot (37.6 m), 226-ton steam fishing trawler was bombed and damaged resulting in her sinking in the Atlantic Ocean 112 nautical miles (207 km) north east of May Island, Firth of Forth.
ORP Torun	Polish Navy	World War II: The Warszawa-class river monitor was scuttled on the Pripyat River to avoid capture. Raised, repaired and put into Soviet service as Vinnitsa.
ORP Warszawa	Polish Navy	World War II: The Warszawa-class river monitor was scuttled on the Pripyat River to avoid capture. Raised, repaired and put in Soviet service as Vitebsk.

== 19 September ==
List of shipwrecks: 19 September 1939
Ship	State	Description
ORP Wilno	Polish Navy	World War II: The Kraków-class river monitor was scuttled near Osabowicze to avoid capture.
ORP Zaradna	Polish Navy	World War II: The Zaradna-class gunboat was scuttled on the Strumen River to avoid capture. She was raised, repaired and put into Soviet service as Beloruss.
ORP Zawzięta	Polish Navy	World War II: The Zuchwała-class gunboat was scuttled on the Strumen River to avoid capture. She was raised, repaired and put in Soviet service as Trudovoy.

== 20 September ==
List of shipwrecks: 20 September 1939
Ship	State	Description
U-27	Kriegsmarine	World War II: The Type VIIA submarine (616/733 t, 1936) was depth charged and sunk in the Atlantic Ocean west of Lewis, Scotland (58°35′N 9°02′W) by HMS Faulknor, HMS Forester and HMS Fortune (all Royal Navy). All 38 crew were rescued.

== 21 September ==
List of shipwrecks: 21 September 1939
Ship	State	Description
ORP Kraków	Polish Navy	World War II: The Kraków-class river monitor was scuttled on the Pina River near the Krolewski Canal to avoid capture. She was raised, repaired and put into Soviet service as Smolensk.

== 22 September ==
List of shipwrecks: 22 September 1939
Ship	State	Description
Akenside	United Kingdom	World War II: The cargo ship (2,694 GRT) was torpedoed and sunk in the North Sea 25 nautical miles (46 km) south west of Bergen, Norway (60°07′N 4°37′E) by U-7 (Kriegsmarine). Her 26 crew were all rescued by the Norwegian torpedo boat Storm and the Marsten Pilot Boat and landed at Bergen.
Martti Ragnar	Finland	World War II: The cargo ship (2,262 GRT) was captured in the Skagerrak 50 nautical miles (93 km) south of Arendal, Norway by U-4 (Kriegsmarine). She was towed south for 55 nautical miles (102 km) and then scuttled the next day by explosive charges. Her crew were rescued.

== 23 September ==
List of shipwrecks: 23 September 1939
Ship	State	Description
Walma	Finland	World War II: The cargo ship was captured in the Baltic Sea off Smagen, Sweden by U-4 (Kriegsmarine) and later scuttled 9 nautical miles (17 km) west of the Hållö Lighthouse (58°15′N 11°00′E). Her crew survived.

== 24 September ==
List of shipwrecks: 24 September 1939
Ship	State	Description
Caldew	United Kingdom	World War II: The fishing trawler (287 GRT) was shelled and sunk in the Atlantic Ocean north of the Hebrides (60°47′N 6°20′W) by U-33 (Kriegsmarine). All her 11 crew were rescued by Kronprinsessan Margareta (Sweden). Kronprinsessan Margareta was later intercepted in the Skagerrak by Z14 Friedrich Ihn and Iltis (both Kriegsmarine) and the crew of Caldew were taken as prisoners of war and interned in Stalag X-B, Sandbostel, Lower Saxony, Germany.
Gertrud Bratt	Sweden	World War II: The cargo ship was torpedoed and sunk in the Skagerrak off Jomfruland, Norway (58°40′N 9°52′E) by U-4 (Kriegsmarine). Her 20 crew were rescued.
Hazelside	United Kingdom	World War II: The cargo ship was torpedoed and sunk 10 nautical miles (19 km) south east of the Fastnet Rock (51°17′N 9°22′W) by U-31 (Kriegsmarine) with the loss of 12 of her 34 crew.
Minden	Germany	World War II: The cargo ship (4,301 GRT) was intercepted in the Atlantic Ocean south of Iceland by HMS Calypso (Royal Navy) and was scuttled by her crew, who were rescued by HMS Dunedin (Royal Navy).
Phryné	France	World War II: The cargo ship (2,660 GRT, 1939) struck a mine and sank in the North Sea 3.5 nautical miles (6.5 km) off the Aldeburgh Lightship ( Trinity House) (52°09′N 1°43′E). Her crew were rescued by HMS Boreas and HMS Brazen (both Royal Navy)

== 25 September ==
List of shipwrecks: 25 September 1939
Ship	State	Description
Silesia	Sweden	World War II: The cargo ship was torpedoed and sunk 45 nautical miles (83 km) west north west of Egersund, Norway (58°27′N 4°48′E) by U-36 (Kriegsmarine). All 19 crew were rescued by Suecia (Sweden.
Tegri	Netherlands	World War II: The coaster departed from Gothenburg, Sweden for a Dutch port, but never arrived and was lost without a trace with all seven crew. She probably struck a mine in the North Sea.

== 26 September ==
List of shipwrecks: 26 September 1939
Ship	State	Description
Metallist	Soviet Union	World War II: The tanker was sunk in Narva Bay by Tucha (Soviet Navy). The Soviets blamed the loss on a Polish submarine as a pretext to take action against Estonia.

== 27 September ==
List of shipwrecks: 27 September 1939
Ship	State	Description
PSB&D Co. #11	United States	While under tow from Cordova to Seward, Territory of Alaska, with a cargo of 60 tons of assorted machinery, the scow sank 10 nautical miles (19 km; 12 mi) southwest by south of Johnston Point (60°28′N 146°37′W) on the south-central coast of the Territory of Alaska, probably after hitting a snag. No one was on board.

== 28 September ==
List of shipwrecks: 28 September 1939
Ship	State	Description
Jern	Norway	World War II: The coaster (875 GRT) was stopped and sunk by scutlling charges in the North Sea 65 nautical miles (120 km) off Skudeneshavn, Norway (58°30′N 3°30′E) by U-32 (Kriegsmarine). All fourteen crew were rescued by Caledonia (Sweden).
Nyland	Sweden	World War II: The cargo ship (3,378 GRT) was stopped and later sunk by a torpedo in the North Sea 17 nautical miles (31 km) off Hvidingø, Norway (58°51′N 5°00′E) by U-16 (Kriegsmarine). Her whole crew had been ordered to abandon ship and was rescued by HNoMS Olav Tryggvason (Royal Norwegian Navy).
Solaas	Norway	World War II: The cargo ship (1,368 GRT) was abandonned in the North Sea south of Kristiansand due to water leak of unknown origin. Her 15 crew were all rescued by England (Denmark). She sank the next day.

== 29 September ==
List of shipwrecks: 29 September 1939
Ship	State	Description
Azariah	United Kingdom	World War II: The Thames barge struck a mine and sank off the coast of Essex.
HMS Caledonia	Royal Navy	The training ship caught fire and sank at Rosyth, Fife. Scrapped in situ starting in October 1942.
Takstaas	Norway	World War II: The cargo ship (1,830 GRT) was torpedoed and damaged in the Norwegian Sea 16 nautical miles (30 km) off Bergen (60°15′N 4°14′E) by U-7 (Kriegsmarine). Her whole crew were rescued by the Royal Norwegian Navy torpedo boat Storm. Takstaas was taken in tow by Herkules (Norway) but broke in two, with the bow section sinking. The stern section was towed to port and her cargo of lumber was salvaged before the wreck was scrapped.

== 30 September ==
List of shipwrecks: 30 September 1939
Ship	State	Description
Clement	United Kingdom	World War II: The cargo ship was captured and sunk in the Atlantic Ocean 75 nautical miles (139 km) south east of Pernambuco, Brazil (9°05′S 34°05′W) by Admiral Graf Spee (Kriegsmarine). Her crew survived. Clement was on a voyage from New York, United States to Bahia, Brazil.
Hartbridge	United Kingdom	The cargo ship ran aground on Seal Island, Nova Scotia and was wrecked.
ORP Komendant Piłsudski	Polish Navy	World War II: Invasion of Poland: The Filin-class guard ship was sunk by enemy action. Subsequently salvaged by the Germans and entered Kriegsmarine service as Heisternest.
Vendia	Denmark	World War II: The cargo ship was torpedoed and sunk off Skagen by U-3 (Kriegsmarine) with the loss of eleven of her seventeen crew. Survivors were rescued by Svava (Denmark) and U-3.

== Unknown ==
List of shipwrecks: unknown September 1939
Ship	State	Description
ORP Hetman Zolkiewski	Polish Navy	World War II: The armed tug was scuttled to prevent capture in the Narew River off the Modlin Fortress, just outside Warsaw, Poland. The wreck was located on 5 October 2024
