= Operationsbefehl Hartmut =

Code word to begin German submarine operations in WWII

Operationsbefehl Hartmut (literally "Operation Order Hartmut") was the code word to begin German submarine operations during Operation Weserübung - Nazi Germany's invasion of Denmark and Norway. Occasionally these operations are termed Operation Hartmut. The orders involved submarine screening actions for the German invasion fleet and reconnaissance - particularly off Narvik and Trondheim. The orders also resulted in a number of attacks on Allied forces - particularly in or near the fjords of the Norwegian coast.

The operation's reconnaissance and screening objectives succeeded for the most part, however Hartmut is notable for the large number of faulty torpedoes fired and four U-boats sunk. These problems came at a time when the war in the Atlantic was still going exceptionally well against Britain. The deployment of U-boats during Operation Weserübung is occasionally criticized as a waste of manpower and materiel for this reason. The use of magnetic pistols and operations in cold weather rendered the G7e torpedo less effective. Coastal operations may have also hampered commanders used to the open sea. Speculation persists that massive torpedo failure during this campaign provoked German naval high command into improving the weapon's performance. U-boat commanders like Prien, Schultze and Schütze experienced the only patrols of their careers without any tonnage sunk.

== Hartmut's execution ==
First hints of an impending invasion of Norway and Denmark came in March 1940. By early April, most of the U-boats to be used for Operation Hartmut as part of Operation Weserübung were ready. BdU Karl Dönitz intermittently sent ships to reconnoitre areas of the Norwegian coast and to try to locate portions of the British fleet.

Due to submarines' generally slow surface speed compared to surface vessels, many of the U-boats specifically assigned to perform in Operation Weserübung departed before the main surface fleet left from the mouth of the Weser river on the morning of 7 April. Twenty U-boats went out on 3, 4 and 5 April.

=== Hartmut preparations ===
Preparations in the German submarine forces (U-bootwaffe) began in early March. On 4 March 1940 Karl Dönitz received orders from his superiors in Berlin:

1. Further U-boat sailings are to be stopped. U-boats which have already sailed are not to operate off the Norwegian coast.
2. All Naval forces to be ready for operations as quickly as possible. No special degree of readiness.

Dönitz mobilized any vessel that could dive. Only 12 larger Type VII and Type IX submarines capable of operating in the Atlantic Ocean were fit for the operation. One older ocean-going Type IA was also included. 12 smaller Type II U-boats were called up, despite that the Norwegian coast limited their operating time. The operation subsequently disrupted training exercises in the Baltic Sea as six outdated Type IIA training submarines were brought into the North Sea.

At this point, commanders and crews were simply ordered into the North Sea. A sealed envelope aboard each of the U-boats held their official orders. The envelope was to be opened upon receiving the radio code word "Hartmut" (hence the attributed name Operation Hartmut).

Dönitz predicted spectacular results for his submarines. In his memoirs he wrote, "Undoubtedly the enemy would react sharply to the landing of German troops in Norway. Their operations could be directed at our occupied ports or their own facilities - that is, strategically important sites for the English... The enemy was also bound to the narrow waterways of the fjords; their ships would have to pass near the U-boats. They could only go unseen in very turbulent weather. The deployment of multiple U-boats in staggered formation would likely yield more shooting opportunities."

By the beginning of April 1940, 31 U-boats were ready for operations between England and Norway. On 6 April, the codeword "Hartmut" was transmitted and German submarines began their designated operations.

=== Attacks on Allied vessels ===
German submarines operating near the Norwegian coast made numerous attacks on British ships, although many proved unsuccessful due to faulty torpedoes.

==== U-4 ====
U-4 sank the British T-class submarine HMS Thistle.

==== U-13 ====
U-13 sank the British steam merchant Swainby off the Shetland islands with one torpedo on 17 April.

After docking in Bergen for a short time, U-13 then sank the Danish vessel Lily that had been taken as a prize by the British after the German occupation of Denmark. The first torpedo failed to arm, but the second broke the ship in half. A few days later U-13 damaged another British ship before returning to port.

==== U-37 ====
U-37 sank one Swedish tanker, one Norwegian freighter and one British freighter equalling 18,715 tons of shipping between 10 and 12 April.

==== U-38 ====
There were two naval battles of Narvik on 10 April 1940 and 13 April 1940. U-38 and U-65 were positioned at the entrance of the fjord. When the Royal Navy arrived, U-38 fired at HMS Valiant and at HMS Southampton missing both. In the second battle, U-38 fired at HMS Effingham but the torpedoes detonated prematurely.

==== U-47 ====
U-47 under Günther Prien encountered "a wall of ships" on 15 April. A British fleet of cruisers and transport ships were anchored near Narvik offloading troops and war materials. Prien targeted two cruisers and two transports with the four forward torpedoes but none detonated. An hour and a half later after a thorough inspection of the tubes and torpedoes, Prien tried again. Again, with a textbook surfaced attack from 750m away using four torpedoes U-47 had no success. One detonated underwater after hitting a rock, well off course.

After leaving Ofotfjord, U-47 spotted and attacked HMS Warspite. One torpedo detonated ahead of the battleship, while another detonated far behind. U-47 spent the next hours submerged under persistent depth charge attack.

==== U-48 ====
U-48 under Herbert Schultze made multiple attacks on a fleet of three cruisers on 10 April, but the torpedoes failed to arm or detonated prematurely. Later on 14 April, U-48 attacked HMS Warspite but both torpedoes failed to detonate. Warspite's destroyer screen fired on the vessel and U-48 was depth charged, but escaped destruction.

==== U-51 ====
U-51 attacked a destroyer, but the torpedoes detonated prematurely. On 19 April, commander Dietrich Knorr attacked the French cruiser Émile Bertin, but both torpedoes missed.

==== U-65 ====
Hans-Gerrit von Stockhausen commanding U-65 attacked a group of British destroyers, but the torpedoes missed or failed to arm. The U-boat subsequently suffered moderate damage when the same destroyers depth charged her.

=== Operational results ===
U-boats succeeded in reporting some Allied fleet movements, but Dönitz' greatest interest was sinking ships - a portion of Hartmut where the U-boats performed underwhelmingly. In general, submarine attacks in the Norwegian waters proved ineffective. Nearly two-thirds of the magnetic pistols failed by either detonating too early, not arming, or running too deep.

Despite orders to cease using magnetic pistols in late 1939, Dönitz had authorized commanders to use either magnetic or impact pistols on their torpedoes during Operation Weserübung. Cold water in the North Sea and Norwegian fjords hampered the use of electric torpedoes used at the time, which required heating to reach suitable operating temperature.

Other speculation has pointed to the unfamiliar conditions of the campaign for the abnormally large number of torpedo failures. Most commanders were used to operating at sea where the effect of tides and currents over short distances is negligible between a boat and its target. Underwater movement may have significantly affected torpedoes, by throwing them off course or making them run too deep - potentially explaining at least part of the missed shots and torpedo failures.

Four submarines were also lost - three ocean-going submarines consisting of two VIIBs and one IXB along with one older IIA.

== Submarine order of battle ==
Operation Hartmut engaged nearly every submarine in Germany's navy - most notably, both older Type IA submarines and all six of Germany's IIA coastal submarines, which were operating as training boats in the Baltic. Boats which were initially unavailable for action at the beginning of the operation took part in ferrying supplies or patrolling later on.

When Hartmut was issued on 6 April 1940 the German plan designated the U-bootwaffe into eight groups (along with a further Group Seven, which was cancelled).

=== U-Boat Group One ===
Patrol Area: Narvik, Harstad, Westfjord, Vagsfjord

- U-25 - one of only two Type IA submarines in the Kriegsmarine. Under the command of Viktor Schütze, U-25 had no success during Hartmut.
- U-46 - a Type VIIB under Herbert Sohler with IWO Erich Topp. U-46 had no success during Hartmut.
- U-51 - a Type VIIB under Dietrich Knorr, who failed to sink any vessels during Hartmut.
- U-64 - a Type IXB under Georg-Wilhelm Schulz. U-64 was the first U-boat sunk by aircraft in the war. While anchored near Bjerkvik, British forces including a Fairey Swordfish launched from HMS Warspite sank the boat on 13 April. Schulz and other surviving crew were rescued from the water by German troops in Norway.
- U-65 - a Type IXB, which patrolled in the North Sea for 36 days without sinking any ships.

=== U-Boat Group Two ===
Patrol Area: Trondheim, Namsos, Romsdalsfjord

- U-30 - a Type VIIA under Fritz-Julius Lemp, who was responsible for sinking the SS Athenia, the first ship sunk during the war. His patrol along the coast of Norway during Hartmut was uneventful.
- U-34 - a Type VIIA, which torpedoed the scuttled Norwegian minelayer HNoMS Frøya on 13 April.

=== U-Boat Group Three ===
Patrol Area: Bergen, Aalesund, Shetland Islands

- U-9 - a Type IIB commanded by Wolfgang Lüth. While U-9 had a relatively successful career, she sank no ships during Hartmut.
- U-15 - a Type IIB successfully commanded by Herbert Wohlfarth, but which failed to sink any ships during Hartmut.
- U-56 - a Type IIC with an uneventful patrol.
- U-60 - a Type IIC with an uneventful patrol.
- U-62 - a Type IIC with an uneventful patrol.

=== U-Boat Group Four ===
Patrol Area: Stavanger

- U-1 - a Type IIA brought into frontline service. The submarine was sunk by mines, probably on 6 April.
- U-4 - a Type IIA brought into frontline status before returning to her role as a training boat. Sank the British T-class submarine HMS Thistle.

=== U-Boat Group Five ===
Patrol Area: East of the Shetland Islands, Vagsfjord, Trondheim

- U-37 - a Type IXA, one of the few boats to survive to be scuttled near the war's end. During Hartmut, K.Kapt. Werner Hartmann sank three freighters.
- U-38 - a Type IXA under Heinrich Liebe. U-38 engaged multiple ships, but was plagued with premature torpedo detonations and misses.
- U-47 - a Type VIIB under Günther Prien and IWO Hans-Werner Kraus.
- U-48 - a Type VIIB under Herbert Schultze and IWO Reinhard Suhren - both who ended the war as successful U-Boat aces, but had no success on this patrol.
- U-49 - a Type VIIB under Kurt von Gossler was sunk on 15 April by depth charges from the British destroyers HMS Fearless and HMS Brazen with one dead and 41 survivors.
- U-50 - a Type VIIB was sunk by mines on 6 April en route to her patrol area.

=== U-Boat Group Six ===
Patrol Area: Pentland, Orkney islands, Shetland Islands

- U-13 - a Type IIB commanded by Max-Martin Schulte. She sank two ships and damaged another during the operational time period. During this patrol, U-13 docked in recently occupied Bergen for a short time on 19 to 21 April.
- U-57 - a Type IIC under Claus Korth. U-57 sank a British tanker in late March, but had no success during Weserübung.
- U-58 - a Type IIC under Herbert Kuppisch had one long patrol during the entire operation, but no ships sunk.
- U-59 - a Type IIC commanded by Harald Jürst, which sank one Norwegian vessel on 6 April.

=== U-Boat Group Seven ===
Never assembled. Group Seven was designated to patrol the Eastern entrance to the English Channel, but was cancelled.

=== U-Boat Group Eight ===
Patrol Area: Lindesnes, Egernsund

- U-2 - a Type IIA brought to frontline status for two patrols during the operation before returning to her role as a training boat.
- U-3 - a Type IIA also brought into frontline service for the operation.
- U-5 - a Type IIA brought into frontline service for one patrol.
- U-6 - a Type IIA brought into frontline service for one patrol.

=== U-Boat Group Nine ===
Patrol Area: Bergen, Shetland Islands; SW of the Norwegian Coast.

- U-7 - a Type IIB, which was on patrol west of the Norwegian Coast when Dönitz first received orders to prepare for Hartmut. U-7 conducted three patrols during March/April 1940.
- U-10 - a Type IIB that sank a Norwegian vessel in February, but nothing on patrol during Hartmut.
- U-19 - a Type IIB that sank four Danish merchants on 19 and 20 March.

=== Unassigned ===
These U-boats began patrols during the timeframe of Operation Weserübung, but were not fit for service (either due to damage, command changes or other reasons) during the beginning of Hartmut. These submarines generally operated in the area of the Orkney islands, Shetland Islands, and near Bergen.

- U-17 - a Type IIB for frontline training; until late April U-17 was not on war patrol.
- U-23 - Otto Kretschmer's former Type IIB. The submarine had no success during Hartmut.
- U-24 - a Type IIB that began operations in late April without success.
- U-61 - a Type IIC under the command of Jürgen Oesten went on patrol in mid-April, but did not have any success.

== Other submarine actions ==
- U-26 - a Type IA - one of only two in the Kriegsmarine (the other being U-25 from Group One). U-26 delivered supplies to German troops in Trondheim, before going on patrol and sinking one British supply ship on 21 April.
- U-29 - a Type VIIA also tasked with delivering supplies to Trondheim, but with an uneventful subsequent patrol.
- U-32 - a Type VIIA that delivered supplies to Trondheim in early May.
- U-43 - a Type IXA, which also delivered supplies to Trondheim. On her return journey she was bombed by two British Hudson aircraft on 22 April, suffering light damage on the return journey to Wilhelmshaven.

== See also ==
- Operation Weserübung
- Battles of Narvik
- Battle of the Atlantic
