= SS Northern Light =

SS Northern Light may refer to:

- SS Northern Light (1942) (MC hull number 289), a Type C2-S-B1 ship that became USS Pierce (AP-95/APA-50) for the United States Navy during World War II; scrapped 1969
- SS Northern Light (1944) (MC hull number 1354), a Type C2-S-AJ1 ship that became USS Panamint (AGC-13) for the United States Navy during World War II; scrapped in 1961
