= USS Terror (CM-5) =

US naval vessel (1942–1956)

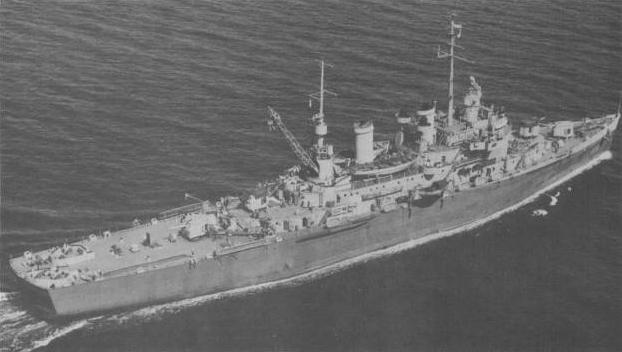

History

United States
- Name: USS Terror
- Builder: Philadelphia Navy Yard
- Laid down: 3 September 1940
- Launched: 6 June 1941
- Commissioned: 15 July 1942
- Decommissioned: 6 August 1956
- Reclassified: MM-5, 7 February 1955; MMF-5, October 1955
- Stricken: 1 November 1970
- Honours and awards: 4 battle stars (WWII)
- Fate: Sold for scrapping, 1971

General characteristics
- Type: Minelayer
- Displacement: 5,875 long tons (5,969 t)
- Length: 454 ft 10 in (138.63 m)
- Beam: 60 ft 2 in (18.34 m)
- Draft: 19 ft 7 in (5.97 m)
- Propulsion: 2 × General Electric double-reduction geared steam turbines, 2 shafts, 22,000 shp (16,405 kW)
- Speed: 25.3 knots (46.9 km/h; 29.1 mph)
- Complement: 481
- Armament: 4 × 5"/38 caliber guns; 4 × quad 1.1"/75 caliber guns (replaced by 4 × quad 40 mm guns in May 1943); 14 × 20 mm guns; 900 x Seamines (600 assembled, 300 ready to assemble)

USS Terror (CM-5) was a fleet minelayer of the United States Navy, the only minelayer of the fleet built specifically for and retained for minelaying during World War II (two sister ships, the Catskill and the Ozark, were converted into LSVs [Landing Ship, Vehicle] before commissioning).

She was laid down on 3 September 1940 by the Philadelphia Navy Yard; launched on 6 June 1941; sponsored by Mrs. Ralph A. Bard; and commissioned on 15 July 1942.

== Service history ==
=== North Africa, 1942 ===
Following fitting out and shakedown, Terror arrived at New York on 30 October 1942 to prepare for her first large-scale operation. With Task Group 38.3, the new minelayer sortied the harbor on 2 November and set her course for North Africa. Rain squalls, strong winds, and heavy seas forced the convoy to alter its course, but its goal remained the same — the support and reinforcement of Operation Torch.

At dawn on 14 November, Terror parted company with the convoy and, escorted by a single destroyer, made her way at 20 knots (37 km/h) to the newly taken port of Casablanca. Sunken ships added to the congestion of the harbor as Terror fueled Miantonomah (CMc-5) and supplied that vessel with mines. Terror then prepared for her primary mission at Casablanca and the task for which she had been designed, minelaying. Her sortie was delayed on the morning of the 16th due to continued congestion in the harbor. Later, as Terror's crew made ready to get underway, they discovered that a large, "old fashioned" anchor with a heavy chain was fouling the ship's starboard anchor chain. After correcting this problem, Terror got underway in company with two minesweepers and, in short order, began laying the minefield which would protect the ships in the harbor. When completed, shortly before dark the same day, the minefield provided Allied shipping a protected channel entrance to Casablanca, stretching seven miles (11 km) out from El Hank Light, a formidable barrier for any marauding enemy submarine to penetrate. Steaming at 16 knots (30 km/h), Terror made her way back to the port just as night fell.

On the following day, despite the obstacles imposed by rudimentary receiving facilities on shore and an extreme shortage of lighters, Terror unloaded her cargo of depth charges and ammunition, using a salvaged tank lighter and several wooden barges. Having accomplished her mission, Terror departed Casablanca and rendezvoused with a convoy bound for the east coast of the United States. Strong head winds, heavy seas, and the slowness of the convoy made it difficult for Terror to keep her station. Off the Virginia Capes, Terror was detached from the convoy and made for the Naval Mine Depot, Yorktown. She arrived on 30 November to commence overhaul and training.

=== Yorktown, 1942–1943 ===
In the months that followed, Terror operated out of Yorktown, making frequent voyages to the Chesapeake Bay for exercises and occasionally stopping at Norfolk for repairs or overhaul. Often students from the Mine Warfare Training Facility came on board for instruction tours. Meanwhile, members of Terror's crew, when not attending classes ashore, participated in drills, training, and exercises in gunnery, mine warfare, and damage control. In February, the minelayer assisted Nuthatch (AM-60) as that vessel tested the Mark 10 "Hedgehog" off Yorktown. After receiving additional antiaircraft guns in May, Terror participated in tactical exercises in the Chesapeake Bay through the summer.

=== Pacific, 1943–1945 ===
Late in September, she began loading mines in preparation for her departure from the Atlantic coast. At Norfolk, she rendezvoused with Task Unit 29.2.5; and, on 2 October, she got underway for the Canal Zone and Pacific ports. On the morning of 19 October, she passed under the Golden Gate Bridge and anchored in San Francisco Bay. The next day, she departed the west coast and steamed via Pearl Harbor to the Ellice Islands.

She arrived at Funafuti on 9 November, unloaded pontoon barges, and took on fresh water. During the nearly three weeks she remained at Funafuti, Terror supported the many small craft which surveyed and mined the approaches to the atoll, supplying them with provisions, water, repairs, and medical services. At the same time, she assisted in the conversion of a 1,500-ton covered lighter into a barracks for a construction battalion, sending skilled personnel to speed the work and providing water and mess facilities for the battalion until the task was completed. On the 17th, Terror's gunners fired on the enemy for the first time when Japanese planes bombed the runway on Funafuti. The Japanese raiders dropped 40 bombs near the airstrip, causing a fire which burned for an hour. Another alert followed in the afternoon, but no further action occurred. Terror laid mooring buoys in the anchorage before getting underway for Hawaii on 28 November. Early in December, she loaded mines and gear at Pearl Harbor; then set her course for Tarawa, where she provided heavy equipment and mines for mine details. At night, searchlights from shore combed the dark, spotting enemy planes in an attempt to foil the persistent Japanese raiders.

On Christmas Day, Terror got underway. She delivered mines and heavy equipment to units at Espiritu Santo and Guadalcanal before arriving at Makin Island on 18 January 1944. The minelayer anchored in the lagoon while her boats surveyed the passes in the reef. She then readied a self-propelled barge to mine the channels. She departed Makin on the 28th and proceeded independently to Tarawa where she embarked Mine Detail 19. On 31 January 1945, she got underway for Pearl Harbor and took on passengers for transportation to San Francisco. After a three-day stay, she departed the west coast on 21 February with over 500 passengers on board, accommodated on a temporary wooden deck constructed over the tracks on the mine deck. She discharged her passengers at Pearl Harbor on the 26th; then steamed on to Majuro, where she arrived on 10 March.

During the rest of March and into April, she conducted minelaying operations in the Marshall Islands before getting underway for the Hawaiian Islands on 22 April. There, she underwent repairs, loaded mines, and participated in gunnery exercises before departing on 24 May. In the following months, she carried ammunition, mines, and bombs to the Marshalls and Mariana Islands, returning once to Pearl Harbor to load ammunition. On 17 August, she departed Oahu — this time setting her course for the west coast. Terror arrived at San Francisco on the 24th for drydocking and overhaul. On 9 September, she got underway carrying a cargo of ammunition. After loading mines and minesweeping gear at Pearl Harbor, she steamed to Ulithi where she began defensive mining operations.

On 15 October, Terror was transferred from ServRon 6 to Minecraft Pacific Fleet. During October and November, she carried cargoes to the Marianas, Carolines, and Admiralties. On 25 November, she entered the Navy Yard at Pearl Harbor for repairs and alterations to accommodate the staff of Commander, Minecraft Pacific Fleet. On 6 January 1945, Terror assumed duty as the flagship of Rear Admiral Alexander Sharp.

For two weeks, Terror conducted exercises out of Pearl Harbor. Then, on 22 January, she got underway and proceeded via Eniwetok to the Carolines. At Ulithi, Terror supplied mines and gear to minecraft preparing for the invasion of Iwo Jima. She then steamed on to Tinian to act as tender for minecraft in that second staging area. On 13 February, she departed the Marianas setting her course for the Volcano Islands.

==== Iwo Jima ====
At 07:17 on 17 February, Terror arrived in the fire support area off the east coast of Iwo Jima. Pre-assault bombardment and minesweeping were well underway when fire from guns on the cliff lined shore began to interfere with minesweepers operating close inshore, north of the eastern beaches. Terror closed the shore to 10,000 yards (9,100 m) and, for 20 minutes, added her five-inch (127 mm) gunfire to the bombardment in an attempt to aid the small craft. Nevertheless, the formidable barrage put out by the enemy began to take its toll as first Pensacola (CA-24) and then Leutze (DD-481) suffered hits. Shortly after noon, damaged landing craft began coming alongside the tender for assistance. Terror acted as a casualty evacuation vessel for minesweepers and small craft acting in support of underwater demolition teams. Soon her medical facilities were severely taxed. One after another of these small craft came alongside to transfer their wounded and to receive assistance in repairing their vessels. Terror continued her duties off Iwo Jima until 1835 on 19 February when she headed for the Marianas.

==== Okinawa ====
On 21 February, she transferred battle casualties to an Army hospital at Saipan; then steamed to Ulithi, where she arrived on the 23rd. At that base, she serviced and supplied minecraft staging for the assault on Okinawa. She arrived off Kerama Retto on 24 March to act as flagship and tender for minecraft. Terror operated off Kerama Retto until the morning of the 29th when she anchored in that island's harbor. There, despite the constant danger of kamikaze attacks, she performed her dual role as tender and flagship. Her entire complement labored long hours to maintain the supply of water, oil, gear, and ammunition required by minecraft in the area. At the same time, her resources were further strained by the duties imposed by her status as flagship.

On the morning of 2 April 1945, Japanese planes penetrated the harbor. Terror took two of the attackers under fire and witnessed the splashing of one plane only 600 yards (550 m) away. In the following days, Terror — responding to warnings to be prepared for attacks by Japanese aircraft, swimmers, and suicide boats — stationed special night sentries on deck and in a picket boat to intercept any ingenious attackers. Predicted mass air attacks materialized on 6 April when Japanese planes pounded the harbor at Kerama Retto for four hours, coming in on Terror from all quarters and keeping her gunners busy. The tender joined other ships in downing two Japanese planes and furnished rescue boats, clothing, and treatment for the survivors of LST-447 and SS Logan Victory.

Throughout April, Terror remained at Kerama Retto providing logistic services and receiving casualties from ships hit by kamikazes. Combat air patrols kept raiders outside the harbor most of the time; but, on 28 April, Pinkney (APH-2) — anchored nearby — was hit by a suicide plane. Terror fired on the enemy aircraft, sent boats to Pinkney's aid, and treated many casualties. During the long and arduous month of April, Terror's crew went to general quarters 93 times, for periods ranging from seven minutes to six and one-half hours.

==== Kamikaze attack, 1 May 1945 ====
Minutes before 04:00 on 1 May 1945, as Terror lay at anchor in Kerama Retto, a kamikaze dove toward the ship. Darting through a hole in the smoke screen and coming in on Terror's port beam, the attacker banked sharply around the stern, then came in from the starboard quarter so rapidly that only one of the minelayer's stern guns opened fire. As the plane crashed into the ship's communication platform, one of its bombs exploded. The other penetrated the main deck before it, too, exploded. The aircraft's engine tore through the ship's bulkheads to land in the wardroom. Fire flared immediately in the superstructure but was soon controlled and, within two hours, was extinguished. Flooding of the magazines prevented possible explosions, and no engineering damage occurred, but the kamikaze had exacted its toll. The attack cost Terror 171 casualties: 41 dead, 7 missing, and 123 wounded.

The following day, the battered ship was moored to Natrona (APA-214) for emergency repairs. She got underway on the 8th to rendezvous with a convoy bound for Saipan. Since a survey of the vessel revealed that her damage was too great to be repaired in a forward area, Terror steamed via Eniwetok and Pearl Harbor to the west coast. She reached San Francisco on 1 June 1945, unloaded ammunition, and then began her overhaul.

=== Post-war, 1945–1947 ===
Her repairs completed, she departed San Francisco Bay on 15 August - the day of the surrender of Japan - and steamed for Korea via the Hawaiian Islands, Saipan, and Okinawa. Moored in Buckner Bay on 16 September, she weathered a furious typhoon. Pounding against Patoka (AO-9) put a few holes in Terror's side, but she was soon repaired. On 9 October, while still at Okinawa, she emerged undamaged from another typhoon which beached or wrecked over 100 vessels at Buckner Bay and Unten Ko.

In December, Panamint (AGC-13) replaced Terror as flagship for Minecraft Pacific Fleet, and the veteran of many Pacific campaigns again crossed the Pacific to arrive at San Francisco in February. She made one voyage to Pearl Harbor in March, then returned to the west coast.

Terror remained there until February 1947 when she departed San Francisco and steamed through the Panama Canal to embark the Commander, Minecraft Atlantic Fleet, at San Juan late in February. Following exercises in the Caribbean, she operated out of east coast ports until July 1947 when she arrived at the Charleston Navy Yard for inactivation.

=== In reserve and decommissioning, 1947–1956 ===
During the Korean War, she was placed in service in reserve; and, on 7 February 1955, she was redesignated a fleet minelayer (MM-5). Her designation symbol was changed to MMF-5 in October 1955, and she was decommissioned on 6 August 1956. In 1971, her hulk was sold to the Union Minerals and Alloys Corporation, of New York City.

Terror received four battle stars for World War II service.

== See also ==
- HMS Adventure (M23)
- Abdiel class minelayer
- French cruiser Pluton
- Robert H. Smith-class destroyer
