= List of shipwrecks in 1939 =

The list of shipwrecks in 1939 includes ships sunk, foundered, grounded, or otherwise lost during 1939.

table of contents
← 1938 / 1939 / 1940 →
| Jan | Feb | Mar | Apr |
| May | Jun | Jul | Aug |
| Sep | Oct | Nov | Dec |
Unknown date

== Unknown date ==
List of shipwrecks: Unknown date 1939
| Ship | State | Description |
|---|---|---|
| Alfonso XIII | Spain | The passenger ship was damaged by fire at Bilbao after 26 June. She was repaired and returned to service. |
| Aurea | United Kingdom | World War II: The fishing trawler was bombed by Luftwaffe aircraft and sunk in the North Sea 150 nautical miles (280 km) east by north of the Isle of May, Fife. |
| Blatchford | United States | The ship, part of the floating Powell River Breakwater, sank sometime in 1939. |
| C 2 | Spanish Republican Navy | Spanish Civil War: The C 1-class motor launch was lost in February or March. |
| C 5 | Spanish Republican Navy | Spanish Civil War: The C 1-class motor launch was lost in February or March. |
| Comitas | Italy | Comitas The cargo ship was driven ashore and broke in two. |
| Gambhira | United Kingdom | World War II: The Admiralty requisitioned cargo ship was scuttled as a blockship in Kirk Sound, Scapa Flow Orkney Islands sometime in 1939. Raised in 1943 and re-sunk in Liverpool Bay for use as sonar target on 15 October 1943. |
| Giuseppe | Italy | The collier foundered in the North Sea off Withernsea, Yorkshire, United Kingdom. |
| Governor Stone | United States | The schooner sank at Bay St. Louis, Mississippi. She was refloated, repaired, and returned to service. |
| Habana | Spain | The passenger ship was damaged by fire at Bilbao. She was rebuilt as a cargo ship in 1940–41. |
| Hornet | United States | With no one on board, the motor boat sank near Unga, Territory of Alaska. |
| Kinsol | United Kingdom | The cargo ship sank off Sanda Island, Argyllshire. |
| Oduno | United States | The fishing vessel was lost off Noyes Island in the Alexander Archipelago, Territory of Alaska with the loss of all twelve crew. |
| Rubaan | United Kingdom | The collier ran aground on The Lizard, Cornwall and was wrecked. |
| Sans Peur | United Kingdom | The yacht, owned by George Sutherland-Leveson-Gower, 5th Duke of Sutherland, ran aground off Espiritu Santo Island in the Gulf of California. The vessel's captain managed to refloat Sans Peur and anchor it, but a hole had been opened in the bottom and the ship lay partly flooded. With the aid of the tugboat Retriever, the vessel was made sound and the ship resumed its journey. |
