= SS Minden =

German cargo ship

History
- Name: Minden
- Out of service: 1939
- Fate: Scuttled by crew in 1939

Minden was a German cargo ship, scuttled by her crew near Iceland in 1939.

== Sinking ==
Minden was en route from Rio de Janeiro to Germany, believed to carry valuables (est. four tons of gold) from the Banco Germanico (a branch of Dresdner Bank). On September 24, 1939, the ship was positioned between Iceland and the Faroe Islands when it was intercepted by two British cruisers (HMS Calypso and HMS Dunedin). According to his orders in such a situation, the captain sank the ship with all its cargo.

== Rediscovery ==
The shipwreck was discovered in spring 2017 by the support ship Seabed Constructor which had been rented by the UK-based company Advanced Marine Services (AMS). The search of the ship was halted by the Icelandic Coast Guard at the beginning of April 2017. On October 11, 2017, the Environment Agency of Iceland (Umhverfisstofnun) gave Advanced Marine Services permission to continue their search for Minden until May 1, 2018. In November 2017, the research ship MV Forland Inspector had to abandon further search at the site because of bad weather. Because of that failed exploration attempt, AMS got permission from the Icelandic authorities to do more research at the wreck even after the expiration date of May 1, 2018. A final search at the wreck was conducted over the period of three days in July 2018 by the vessel MV Seabed Worker. Following these operations, AMS stated in a report to the Environment Agency of Iceland: "No materials have been taken from the wreck. All materials and objects investigated during subsea operations indicated there were no items of interest or value worth retaining.".

== See also ==
- List of shipwrecks in 1939
