= Heinz-Otto Schultze =

German U-boat commander

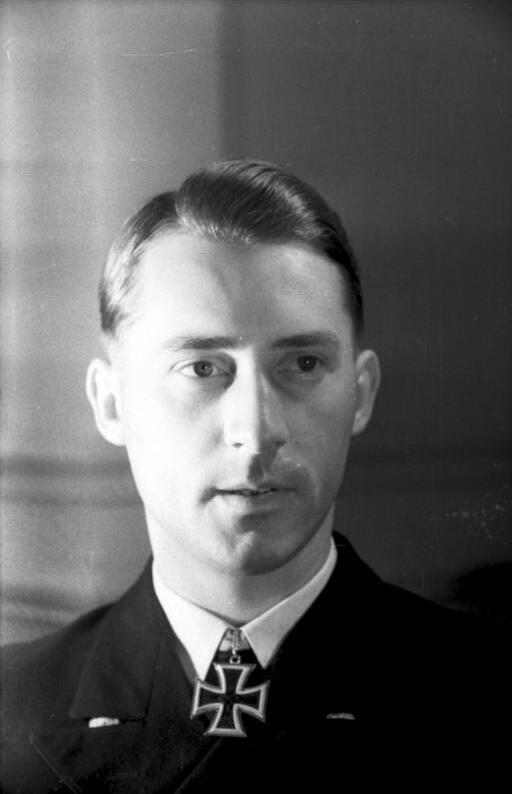
- Heinz-Otto Schultze
- Born: 13 September 1915; Kiel, Schleswig-Holstein, German Empire
- Died: 25 November 1943 (aged 28); German submarine U-849, South Atlantic; 06°30′S 05°40′W
- Relatives: Otto Schultze (father)
- Military career
- Allegiance: Nazi Germany
- Branch: Kriegsmarine
- Service years: 1934–43
- Rank: Kapitänleutnant
- Units: SSS Gorch Fock light cruiser Karlsruhe; Schleswig-Holstein; U-31
- Commands: U-4; U-141; U-432; German submarine U-849
- Conflicts: World War II †
- Awards: Knight's Cross of the Iron Cross

Heinz-Otto Schultze (13 September 1915 in Kiel – 25 November 1943 in the South Atlantic) was a German U-boat commander in World War II and recipient of the Knight's Cross of the Iron Cross (Ritterkreuz des Eisernen Kreuzes). The Knight's Cross of the Iron Cross, and its variants were the highest awards in the military and paramilitary forces of Nazi Germany during World War II. He is credited with the sinking of 20 ships for a total of 67,991 gross register tons (GRT) plus damaging a further two ships for a total of 15,666 GRT.

== Naval career ==
Schultze was born 13 September 1915 in Kiel, at the time in the Province of Schleswig-Holstein, a province of the Kingdom of Prussia. He was the son of Otto Schultze, commander of U-63 during World War I and a recipient of the coveted Pour le Mérite and later Generaladmiral of the Kriegsmarine.

Schultze joined the Reichsmarine on 8 April 1934 as a member of Crew 1934 (the incoming class of 1934), where he received his basic military infantry training with the II. Schiff-Stamm-Abteilung der Ostsee (2nd department of the standing ship division) of the Baltic Sea in Stralsund. (Note: The German Reichsmarine was renamed to Kriegsmarine on 1 June 1935.) He was transferred to the school ship SSS Gorch Fock on 15 June 1934 for his onboard training. Here he was promoted to Seekadett (midshipman) on 26 September 1934. He then was transferred to the light cruiser Karlsruhe on 27 September 1934.

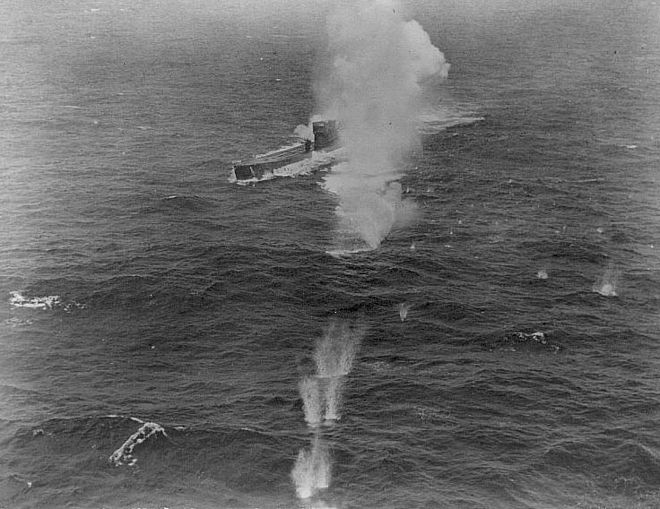
U-849 under attack by a B-24 Liberator on 25 November 1943.

He transferred to the U-boat service on 19 May 1937 and completed the U-boat school. Schultze was first posted on board of U-31 on 30 March 1938, initially serving as a second watch officer. He was made first watch officer on board of U-31 on 6 November 1938 and promoted to Oberleutnant zur See (sub-lieutenant) on 1 April 1939. He received command of his first U-boat, U-4, a school U-boat, on 8 June 1940.

Schultze was ordered to the Schichau-Werke, a shipyard in Danzig (now: Gdańsk, Poland), for construction familiarization of U-432. He commissioned U-432 on 26 April 1941. His first war patrol as a commander, his fifth of the war, lasted from 30 July until 19 September 1941 and resulted in the sinking of four ships totaling 10,774 GRT. Schultze surrendered command of U-432 on 16 January 1943, taking command of U-849 on 11 March 1943. His fifth patrol as a commander of U-432 targeted the East Coast of the United States of America. U-432 left La Pallice on 21 January 1942 and returned to La Pallice on 16 March 1942. During this patrol Schultze torpedoed and sank five ships for 25,107 GRT. After his return, Schultze was heavily criticized by the Befehlshaber der U-Boote (BdU) for the sinking of a Brazilian ship without warning. This attack was conducted against standing orders.

U-849 left Kiel on its first war patrol on 2 October 1943 and was sunk by depth charges from a US B-24 Liberator B-6 from Navy-Squadron VB-107 on 25 November that year in the South Atlantic west of the Congo estuary, in position 06°30′S 05°40′W. Schultze and the entire crew of U-849 were killed in the sinking. This was Schultze's 12th patrol of the war.

== Awards ==
- Dienstauszeichnung 4th Class (1 September 1939)
- Sudetenland Medal (16 September 1939)
- Iron Cross (1939)
  - 2nd Class (2 October 1939)
  - 1st Class (23 September 1941)
- U-boat War Badge (1939) (13 September 1939)
- Knight's Cross of the Iron Cross on 9 July 1942 as Kapitänleutnant and commander of U-432

== Notes ==
Military offices
Preceded by Kapitänleutnant Hans-Peter Hinsch	Commanding officer, U-4; 8 June 1940 – 28 July 1940	Succeeded by Kapitänleutnant Hans-Jürgen Zetzsche
First	Commanding officer, U-141; 21 August 1940 – 30 March 1941	Succeeded by Kapitänleutnant Philip Schüler
First	Commanding officer, U-432; 26 April 1941 – 15 January 1943	Succeeded by Kapitänleutnant Hermann Eckhardt
First	Commanding officer, U-849; 11 March 1943 – 25 November 1941	Ship sunk
