= German submarine U-141 (1940) =

German World War II submarine

History

Nazi Germany
- Name: U-141
- Ordered: 25 September 1939
- Builder: Deutsche Werke, Kiel
- Yard number: 270
- Laid down: 12 December 1939
- Launched: 27 July 1940
- Commissioned: 21 August 1940
- Fate: Scuttled on 5 May 1945 at Wilhelmshaven

General characteristics
- Class & type: Type IID coastal submarine
- Displacement: 314 t (309 long tons) surfaced; 364 t (358 long tons) submerged
- Length: 43.97 m (144 ft 3 in) o/a; 29.80 m (97 ft 9 in) pressure hull
- Beam: 4.92 m (16 ft 2 in) (o/a); 4.00 m (13 ft 1 in) (pressure hull)
- Height: 8.40 m (27 ft 7 in)
- Draught: 3.93 m (12 ft 11 in)
- Installed power: 700 PS (510 kW; 690 bhp) (diesels); 410 PS (300 kW; 400 shp) (electric)
- Propulsion: 2 shafts; 2 × diesel engines; 2 × electric motors
- Speed: 12.7 knots (23.5 km/h; 14.6 mph) surfaced; 7.4 knots (13.7 km/h; 8.5 mph) submerged
- Range: 3,450 nmi (6,390 km; 3,970 mi) at 12 knots (22 km/h; 14 mph) surfaced; 56 nmi (104 km; 64 mi) at 4 knots (7.4 km/h; 4.6 mph) submerged
- Test depth: 80 m (260 ft)
- Complement: 3 officers, 22 men
- Armament: 3 × 53.3 cm (21 in) torpedo tubes; 5 × torpedoes or up to 12 TMA or 18 TMB mines; 1 × 2 cm (0.79 in) C/30 anti-aircraft gun

Service record
- Part of: 1st U-boat Flotilla; 21 August - 23 October 1940; 3rd U-boat Flotilla; 1 May - 30 September 1941; 21st U-boat Flotilla; 1 October 1941–1 March 1945; 31st U-boat Flotilla; 1 March - 5 May 1945
- Identification codes: M 18 009
- Commanders: Oblt.z.S. Heinz-Otto Schultze; 21 August 1940–30 March 1941; Oblt.z.S. Philip Schüler; 31 March - 29 November 1941; Oblt.z.S. Jürgen Kruger; 30 November 1941–15 June 1942; Oblt.z.S. Günther Möller; 16 June 1942–15 February 1943; Oblt.z.S. Dietrich Rauch; 16 February - 28 July 1943; Oblt.z.S. Bernhard Luttmann; 29 July 1943–6 November 1944; Oblt.z.S. Heinrich-Dietrich Hoffmann; 7 November 1944–5 May 1945
- Operations: 4 patrols: 1st patrol: 29 April - 11 May 1941; 2nd patrol: 31 May - 26 June 1941; 3rd patrol: 14 July - 1 August 1941; 4th patrol: 21 August - 18 September 1941
- Victories: 4 merchant ships sunk (6,801 GRT); 1 merchant ship damaged (5,133 GRT)

German submarine U-141 was a Type IID U-boat of Nazi Germany's Kriegsmarine during World War II. Her keel was laid down on 12 December 1939 by Deutsche Werke in Kiel as yard number 270. She was launched on 27 July 1940 and commissioned on 21 August 1940 with Oberleutnant zur See Heinz-Otto Schultze in command.

U-141 began her service life with the 1st U-boat Flotilla. She was then assigned to the 3rd flotilla and subsequently to the 21st flotilla where she conducted four patrols, sinking four ships and damaging another, between May and September 1941. She spent the rest of the war as a training vessel, moving over to the 31st flotilla.

She was scuttled on 5 May 1945.

== Design ==
German Type IID submarines were enlarged versions of the original Type IIs. U-141 had a displacement of 314 tonnes (309 long tons) when at the surface and 364 tonnes (358 long tons) while submerged. Officially, the standard tonnage was 250 long tons (254 t), however. The U-boat had a total length of 43.97 m (144 ft 3 in), a pressure hull length of 29.80 m (97 ft 9 in), a beam of 4.92 m (16 ft 2 in), a height of 8.40 m (27 ft 7 in), and a draught of 3.93 m (12 ft 11 in). The submarine was powered by two MWM RS 127 S four-stroke, six-cylinder diesel engines of 700 metric horsepower (510 kW; 690 shp) for cruising, two Siemens-Schuckert PG VV 322/36 double-acting electric motors producing a total of 410 metric horsepower (300 kW; 400 shp) for use while submerged. She had two shafts and two 0.85 m (3 ft) propellers. The boat was capable of operating at depths of up to 80–150 metres (260–490 ft).

The submarine had a maximum surface speed of 12.7 knots (23.5 km/h; 14.6 mph) and a maximum submerged speed of 7.4 knots (13.7 km/h; 8.5 mph). When submerged, the boat could operate for 35–42 nautical miles (65–78 km; 40–48 mi) at 4 knots (7.4 km/h; 4.6 mph); when surfaced, she could travel 3,800 nautical miles (7,000 km; 4,400 mi) at 8 knots (15 km/h; 9.2 mph). U-141 was fitted with three 53.3 cm (21 in) torpedo tubes at the bow, five torpedoes or up to twelve Type A torpedo mines, and a 2 cm (0.79 in) anti-aircraft gun. The boat had a complement of 25.

== Operational career ==
The U-boat began her operational career with a trip from Kiel to Bergen in Norway in April 1941.

=== First patrol ===
The submarine's first patrol commenced with her departure from Bergen on 29 April 1941. Her destination was Lorient in occupied France which she reached, having crossed the North Sea and made her way north of the Faroe Islands, on 11 May. During the voyage, she was unsuccessfully attacked by a Lockheed Hudson of No. 269 Squadron RAF west of the Outer Hebrides.

=== Second patrol ===
She sank Calabria on 22 June 1941 about 100 nmi (190 km; 120 mi) northwest of the Inishull Lightship (Ireland).

=== Third patrol ===
She damaged Atlantic City and sank Botwey on 26 July 1941, west of Bloody Foreland, (also in Ireland).

=== Fourth patrol ===
U-141's last sortie took her north of Northern Ireland where she sank Jarlinn and King Erik in September 1941.

== Summary of raiding history ==
Date	Ship	Nationality	Tonnage (GRT)	Fate
22 June 1941	Calabria	Sweden	1,277	Sunk
26 July 1941	Atlantic City	United Kingdom	5,133	Damaged
26 July 1941	Botwey	United Kingdom	5,106	Sunk
5 September 1941	Jarlinn	Iceland	190	Sunk
6 September 1941	King Erik	United Kingdom	228	Sunk

== Bibliography ==
- Busch, Rainer; Röll, Hans-Joachim (1999). German U-boat commanders of World War II : a biographical dictionary. Translated by Brooks, Geoffrey. London, Annapolis, Md: Greenhill Books, Naval Institute Press. ISBN 1-55750-186-6.
- Busch, Rainer; Röll, Hans-Joachim (1999). Deutsche U-Boot-Verluste von September 1939 bis Mai 1945 [German U-boat losses from September 1939 to May 1945]. Der U-Boot-Krieg (in German). Vol. IV. Hamburg, Berlin, Bonn: Mittler. ISBN 3-8132-0514-2.
- Gröner, Erich; Jung, Dieter; Maass, Martin (1991). U-boats and Mine Warfare Vessels. German Warships 1815–1945. Vol. 2. Translated by Thomas, Keith; Magowan, Rachel. London: Conway Maritime Press. ISBN 0-85177-593-4.
