= List of shipwrecks in 1940 =

The list of shipwrecks in 1940 includes ships sunk, foundered, grounded, or otherwise lost during 1940.

table of contents
1940
| Jan | Feb | Mar | Apr |
| May | Jun | Jul | Aug |
| Sep | Oct | Nov | Dec |
Unknown date

== Unknown date ==
List of shipwrecks: Unknown date 1940
| Ship | State | Description |
|---|---|---|
| Captain Sturt | Australia | The paddle steamer sank off Kangaroo Island, South Australia. |
| Cläre Hugo Stinnes I | Norway | World War II: The captured German cargo ship was sunk at Ulvik. She was refloated later in 1940 and re-entered German service. |
| Dalhousie | United Kingdom | World War II: The tug was scuttled. |
| Fern | United States | With no one on board, motorboat was wrecked in the middle of George Inlet on the southern coast of Revillagigedo Island in the Alexander Archipelago, Alaska Territory. |
| Haalegg | Norway | World War II: The cargo ship was either bombed and sunk at Narvik, Norway, by Luftwaffe aircraft on 17 May; or was shelled and sunk by Royal Navy ships on 13 April. She was raised in 1945, repaired and returned to service. |
| Jupiter | Australia | The paddle steamer sank off Port Adelaide, South Australia. |
| Kurrara | Australia | The coaster ran aground at Port Stephens, New South Wales and was wrecked. |
| Lancashire Lass | Australia | The paddle steamer sank off Adelaide, South Australia. |
| Lass of Geraldton | Australia | The sailing ship sank in Australian waters. |
| Marzocco | United Kingdom | World War II: The cargo ship was scuttled as a blockship off Peterhead, Aberdeenshire. |
| "Meera" | Sweden | The 103-foot (31 m) 159-ton trawler rolled on her side and was damaged beyond economic repair on a slipway at Lindolmen Shipyard, Gothenburg. |
| HMAS Psyche | Royal Australian Navy | The lighter sank in Salamander Bay off Port Stephens. |
| Raab Karcher | Germany | World War II: The cargo ship was bombed and sunk in the Oosterschelde. |
| Tealings | United Kingdom | World War II: The cargo ship was bombed and sunk. |
| HMS Thames | Royal Navy | World War II: The River-class submarine went missing in the North Sea between 23 July and 3 August. She probably struck a mine and sank in the North Sea off Stavanger, Norway (57°20′N 3°10′E) with the loss of all 63 crew. |
