= HMS Thistle (N24) =

T-Class Submarine

Coordinates: 59°00′N 05°00′E

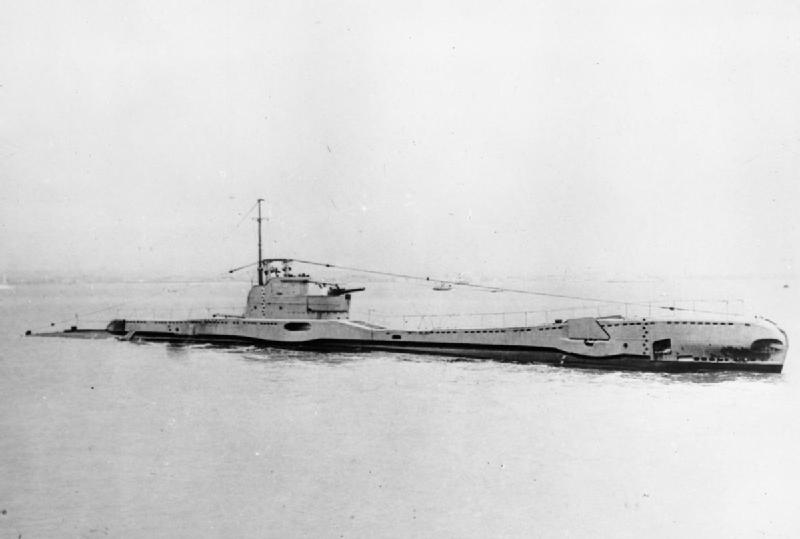
- HMS Thistle

History

United Kingdom
- Name: HMS Thistle
- Builder: Vickers-Armstrongs, Barrow
- Laid down: 7 December 1937
- Launched: 25 October 1938
- Commissioned: 4 July 1939
- Fate: Sunk, 10 April 1940
- Badge

General characteristics
- Class & type: T-class submarine
- Displacement: 1,090 long tons (1,110 t) surfaced; 1,575 long tons (1,600 t) submerged
- Length: 275 ft (84 m)
- Beam: 26 ft 6 in (8.08 m)
- Draught: 16.3 ft (5.0 m)
- Propulsion: Two shafts; Twin diesel engines 2,500 hp (1,900 kW) each; Twin electric motors 1,450 hp (1,080 kW) each
- Speed: 15.25 kn (28.24 km/h; 17.55 mph) surfaced; 9 kn (17 km/h; 10 mph) submerged
- Range: 4,500 nmi (8,300 km; 5,200 mi) at 11 kn (20 km/h; 13 mph) surfaced
- Test depth: 300 ft (91 m) max
- Complement: 59
- Armament: 6 internal forward-facing 21 in (533 mm) torpedo tubes; 4 external forward-facing torpedo tubes; 6 reload torpedoes; 1 x 4 in (102 mm) deck gun

HMS Thistle (N24) was a T-class submarine of the Royal Navy. She was laid down by Vickers-Armstrongs, Barrow and launched in October 1938. She was sunk by the German submarine U-4 on 10 April 1940 near Skudeneshavn, Norway.

== Career ==
At the onset of the Second World War, Thistle was a member of the 2nd Submarine Flotilla. From 26 to 29 August 1939, the flotilla deployed to its war bases at Dundee and Blyth.

Thistle, under the command of Lt. Wilfrid Frederick Haselfoot, was ordered to patrol off Stavanger, and to sink any enemy vessel that she might spot in the harbour, since British authorities believed that a German invasion of Norway was imminent. On 10 April, Thistle signaled her intention to comply with this order and that she had two torpedoes remaining after an unsuccessful attack on a U-boat. With this in mind the Admiralty changed her orders to patrol off Skudeneshavn. No further contact was made with Thistle.

=== Sinking ===
It was later discovered that U-4, the U-boat Thistle had previously attacked, had sighted the submarine on the surface and sunk her with torpedoes.

The action began when HMS Thistle spotted U-4 cruising on the surface with a periscope. At 16:04 hours on 9 April 1940 HMS Thistle fired a spread of six torpedoes, all of which missed. HMS Thistle later reported the unsuccessful engagement via radio, and that the submarine had only two torpedoes left.

U-4 observed one torpedo passing ten meters ahead and evaded further underwater attacks by crash diving. The U-boat crew later heard three explosions of the off-track torpedoes at the end of their run. Afterwards U-4 found HMS Thistle on the surface recharging its batteries.

At 02:13 hours on the morning of 10 April 1940, U-4 fired a spread of two torpedoes at its attacker. The first, a G7a torpedo, missed. The second, a magnetic G7e torpedo, found its mark, sinking Thistle with all hands near Skudeneshavn.

== Discovery ==
The wreck of the Thistle, missing its tower, was discovered by the Norwegian Institute of Marine Research in the spring of 2023, at 160 meters of depth. A second cruise in October 2023 identified the wreck as being Thistle. Royal Navy confirmed the boat is HMS Thistle.
