= HMS Calypso (D61) =

Royal Navy C-class light cruiser

Coordinates: 34°03′N 24°05′E

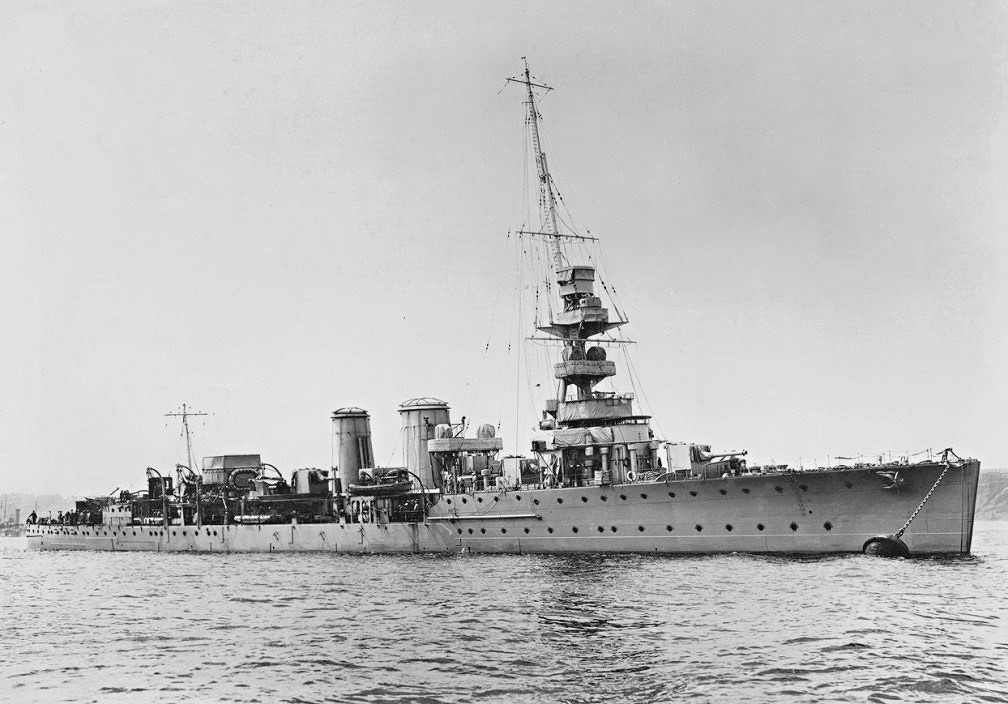
- Calypso

History

United Kingdom
- Name: Calypso
- Builder: Hawthorn Leslie and Company
- Laid down: 17 February 1916
- Launched: 24 January 1917
- Commissioned: 21 June 1917
- Identification: Pennant number: 24 (Jan 18); 82 (Apr 18) 61 (Nov 19); I.61 (1936); D.61 (1940)
- Fate: Sunk, 12 June 1940

General characteristics
- Class & type: C-class light cruiser
- Displacement: 4,120 long tons (4,190 t)
- Length: 450 ft (140 m)
- Beam: 42.9 ft (13.1 m)
- Draught: 14.3 ft (4.4 m)
- Installed power: 6 × Yarrow boilers; 40,000 shp (30,000 kW)
- Propulsion: 2 × shafts; 2 × geared steam turbines
- Speed: 29 knots (54 km/h; 33 mph)
- Complement: 344
- Armament: 5 × single 6 in (152 mm) guns; 2 × single 3 in (76 mm) AA guns; 4 × single 3 pdr (47 mm (1.9 in)) guns; 4 × twin 21 in (533 mm) torpedo tubes
- Armour: Side: 3 in (7.6 cm) (amidships); 1.25–2.25 in (3.2–5.7 cm) (bow); 2–2.5 in (5.1–6.4 cm) (stern); Deck: 1 in (2.5 cm) (upper, amidships); 1 in (2.5 cm) (over rudder)

HMS Calypso (D61) was a C class cruiser of the Caledon sub-class of the Royal Navy, launched in 1917 and sunk in 1940 by the Italian submarine Alpino Bagnolini. Calypso was built by Hawthorn Leslie and Company. Her keel was laid down in February 1916 and she was completed in June 1917.

== First World War ==
Calypso fought in the Second Battle of Heligoland Bight on 17 November 1917, when she and her sister ship Caledon were part of the force that intercepted Kaiserliche Marine (Imperial German Navy) minesweepers near the German coast. During the battle, Calypso's bridge was struck by a 5.9 in (150 mm) shell which killed everyone on the bridge including the captain and caused the accidental firing of a ready torpedo.

== Interwar ==
Calypso went to the rescue of the Greek royal family in 1922 after King Constantine of Greece abdicated and a military dictatorship seized power. The King's brother, Prince Andrew of Greece and Denmark was banished for life by a revolutionary court and was forced to flee with his family, which included his 18-month-old son Philip who would later become Prince Philip, Duke of Edinburgh. The British Government had received news of the situation, and dispatched Calypso to evacuate the family. They boarded with minimal possessions. Philip was carried on board in a cot made from an orange box. The family were taken to Brindisi, Italy, where they were put on a train to Paris.

On 2 November 1924, the destroyer HMS Venomous was steaming in the Grand Harbour upon returning to Valletta, Malta, from a cruise in the Western Mediterranean Sea when she accidentally rammed and sank a motorboat from Calypso. All four people aboard the motorboat were saved by a boat from the destroyer HMS Umpire.

== Second World War ==
During the early part of the Second World War, Calypso served with the 7th Cruiser Squadron on Northern Patrol duty as a blockade ship in the North Sea between Scotland and Iceland. On 24 September 1939, Calypso intercepted the German merchant ship Minden south of Iceland. The crew of Minden scuttled their ship before she could be captured. On 22 November, Calypso captured the German merchant ship Konsul Hendrik Fisser off Iceland. Following the sinking of the Rawalpindi on 23 November, Calypso was involved in the search for the German warships Scharnhorst and Gneisenau. In early 1940, Calypso was sent to Alexandria in the eastern Mediterranean.

Calypso was the first British naval vessel to be sunk by the Regia Marina in the Second World War. Two days after Italy declared war on Great Britain, Calypso was on an anti-shipping patrol against Italian ships travelling to Libya when she was struck by a torpedo from the Italian submarine Alpino Bagnolini (Capitano di corvetta (Lieutenant Commander) Franco Tosoni Pittoni) about 50 mi (80 km) south of Cape Lithion in Crete in the Eastern Mediterranean at 00:59 on 12 June 1940. Thirty nine sailors from Calypso perished in the sinking. The majority of her survivors were rescued by the destroyer Dainty and taken to Alexandria, at least one survivor contracted Pulmonary Tuberculosis from the torpedo.

== Bibliography ==
- Admiral Aldo Cocchia (1956). Submarines Attacking. William Kimber and Company.
- Campbell, N.J.M. (1980). "Great Britain". In Chesneau, Roger (ed.). Conway's All the World's Fighting Ships 1922–1946. Mayflower Books. pp. 2–85. ISBN 0-8317-0303-2.
- Colledge, J. J.; Warlow, Ben (2006) [1969]. Ships of the Royal Navy: The Complete Record of All Fighting Ships of the Royal Navy from the 15th Century to the Present (3rd Rev ed.). London: Chatham Publishing. ISBN 978-1-86176-281-8. OCLC 67375475.
- Friedman, Norman (2010). British Cruisers: Two World Wars and After. Seaforth Publishing. ISBN 978-1-59114-078-8.
- Lenton, H. T. (1998). British & Empire Warships of the Second World War. Naval Institute Press. ISBN 1-55750-048-7.
- Newbolt, Henry (1996) [1931]. Naval Operations. History of the Great War Based on Official Documents. Vol. V. Battery Press. ISBN 0-89839-255-1.
- Playfair, Major-General I.S.O.; Molony, Brigadier C.J.C.; with Flynn, Captain F.C. (R.N.) & Gleave, Group Captain T.P. (2009) [1954]. Butler, Sir James (ed.). The Mediterranean and Middle East, Volume I: The Early Successes Against Italy, to May 1941. History of the Second World War, United Kingdom Military Series. Naval & Military Press. ISBN 978-1-84574-065-8.
- Preston, Antony (1985). "Great Britain and Empire Forces". In Gray, Randal (ed.). Conway's All the World's Fighting Ships 1906–1921. Naval Institute Press. pp. 1–104. ISBN 0-85177-245-5.
- Raven, Alan & Roberts, John (1980). British Cruisers of World War Two. Naval Institute Press. ISBN 0-87021-922-7.
- Rohwer, Jürgen (2005). Chronology of the War at Sea 1939–1945: The Naval History of World War Two (Third Revised ed.). Naval Institute Press. ISBN 1-59114-119-2.
- Whitley, M. J. (1995). Cruisers of World War Two: An International Encyclopedia. Cassell. ISBN 1-86019-874-0.
