= French cruiser Pluton =

Minelayer of the French Navy

- Approximate outlines of Pluton

History

France
- Name: Pluton
- Namesake: Pluto
- Builder: Arsenal de Lorient
- Cost: 102,671,658 francs
- Laid down: 16 April 1928
- Launched: 10 April 1929
- Commissioned: 25 January 1932
- Fate: Sunk by accidental explosion, 13 September 1939
- Badge

General characteristics
- Type: Minelaying cruiser
- Displacement: 5,300 t (5,200 long tons) (standard); 6,214 t (6,116 long tons) (full load)
- Length: 152.5 m (500 ft 4 in)
- Beam: 15.5 m (50 ft 10 in)
- Draft: 5.2 m (17 ft 1 in)
- Installed power: 4 × du Temple boilers; 57,000 shp (43,000 kW)
- Propulsion: 2 × shafts; 2 × geared steam turbines
- Speed: 30 knots (56 km/h; 35 mph)
- Range: 4,510 nmi (8,350 km; 5,190 mi) at 14 knots (26 km/h; 16 mph)
- Capacity: 1000 troops
- Complement: 513 men
- Armament: 4 × 138.6 mm (5.5 in) guns; 10 × 37 mm (1.5 in) AA guns; 220–270 mines

Pluton was a fast minelaying cruiser built for the French Navy in the late 1920s. She was also able to carry 1,000 troops on her mine deck as a fast troop transport. Shortly after completion she was modified and became a gunnery training ship, replacing the elderly armored cruiser Gueydon. Shortly before the beginning of World War II, she reverted to her original role and most of the gunnery training equipment was removed. She was sent to Casablanca, in French Morocco, when the war began to lay a minefield, but the order was cancelled a day later and she was ordered to disembark her naval mines. She exploded while landing her still-fuzed mines on 13 September 1939.

== Design ==
The Marine Nationale decided to build a fast minelayer as part of its 1925 Naval Programme after the British HMS Adventure made her debut in the early 1920s. Pluton was similar in many respects, also being armed with four single destroyer-caliber guns, but was smaller and faster. She could also be used as a fast transport for up to 1,000 troops. The sides of the mine deck were normally open to the weather, but metal panels could be used to close it off when carrying troops.

=== General characteristics ===
Pluton was 152.5 m (500 ft 4 in) long overall. She had a beam of 15.5 m (50 ft 10 in) and a draft of 5.2 m (17 ft 1 in). Her longitudinally framed hull was subdivided by 15 transverse watertight bulkheads. Duralumin was extensively used in the superstructure to save weight, but this resulted in corrosion problems and strength issues. She was fitted with a single counterbalanced rudder powered by an electric motor that was too weak for the job. Her turning circle was 875 m (957 yd) with 25° of rudder at 27 kn (50 km/h; 31 mph), larger than that of the 8,000 t (7,900 long tons) light cruiser Duguay-Trouin which was 30 m (98 ft 5 in) longer. She was totally unarmored and relied upon her watertight subdivision for survival.

=== Propulsion ===
Pluton had a two-shaft unit machinery layout with alternating boiler and engine rooms. Her Bréguet single-reduction impulse geared steam turbines were designed for 57,000 shaft horsepower (43,000 kW), but made 64,705 shp (48,251 kW) on trials. Four du Temple boilers powered the turbines at a pressure of 20 kg/cm^{2} (2,000 kPa; 280 psi). An auxiliary boiler was fitted to heat or cool the ship's magazines and provide drinking water. Each propeller shaft drove a three-bladed 4.08 m (13 ft 5 in) bronze propeller for a designed speed of 30 knots (56 km/h; 35 mph), but she achieved 31.4 knots (58.2 km/h; 36.1 mph) on trials. 1,150 t (1,130 long tons) of fuel oil was carried which was originally calculated to provide an endurance of 7,770 nautical miles (14,390 km; 8,940 mi) at 14 knots (26 km/h; 16 mph), but it was revised downwards to 4,510 nmi (8,350 km; 5,190 mi) once she entered service because the demands of her auxiliary machinery had been seriously underestimated. A pair of 200-kilowatt (270 hp) turbo generators provided electricity at 235 volts. Two 100-kilowatt (130 hp) diesel generators were mounted in the aft engine room to provide power while in harbor and a third was installed in a special compartment on the first deck for emergency use.

=== Armament ===
Pluton was originally intended to carry two single turrets, one each fore and aft, with 203 mm (8 in) guns, four 75 mm (2.95 in) anti-aircraft (AA) guns and four light 37 mm (1.46 in) AA guns. However four 138 mm (5.4 in) guns were substituted for the 203 mm guns before construction began and six more 37 mm guns were added in lieu of the 75 mm guns during construction although the baseplates for the 75 mm guns were retained for future use.

The four 138 mm 40-caliber guns were on M1924 mounts with gun shields. Two guns each were fore and aft in superfiring positions on the centerline. Their elevation limits were -10° to +35° and they had a 270° arc of fire. Their rate of fire was a nominal eight to nine rounds per minute, but proved to be considerably less in service. They had a maximum range of about 18,200 m (19,900 yd) with a 40 kg (88 lb) shell at a muzzle velocity of 700 m/s (2,300 ft/s). 150 rounds were provided for each gun. One powder and one shell magazine served each pair of guns, each of which had their own individual hoist.

Ten 37 mm/50 cal semi-automatic AA guns were carried by Pluton. Two were fitted on the foredeck, six amidships between the funnels and two on a platform at the stern. 10,000 rounds were carried with 144 rounds in ready-use boxes near each gun. The guns could depress 15° and elevate to 80°. They fired 0.725 kg (1.60 lb) shells at a muzzle velocity of 810 m/s (2,657 ft/s). Their effective anti-aircraft range was less than 5,000 meters (16,404 ft). All of these guns—except for the pair on the stern—were removed shortly after Pluton was commissioned in 1932.

Twelve obsolete 8 mm (0.315 in) Hotchkiss M1914 machine guns were carried in six twin mounts. Two mounts were on top of the bridge, two atop the after boiler room ventilator housing and two just forward of the tripod mainmast. 48,000 rounds were provided for them. They were removed shortly after Pluton was commissioned in 1932.

Pluton was designed to carry 220 1,500 kg (3,300 lb) Sautter-Harlé mines, but had space for 30 extra, for a total of 250. They were carried on the first deck, or mine deck, using a system of four rails along the sides of the ship and moved via chain-drives. Each pair of rails converged on a turntable at the forward end of the rails and a transverse spur connected the two turntables. The spur facilitated loading mines from one side of the ship and allowed mines to be moved to each of the rails. The rails ended in four ramps at the stern of the ship that sloped down at a 30° angle to minimize the shock of impact when the mines were released from the chain drive. Up to 270 of the smaller Bréguet B4 mines could be carried.

== Service ==
She entered service with the French Mediterranean Fleet in 1932. Pluton experienced many teething problems, particularly with the machinery. Shortly after she was commissioned the Navy decided to give her an extra role as a gunnery training ship and she entered Toulon Dockyard for the necessary modifications on 24 October 1932. Quarters for 40 men were added on the mine deck. Most of the 37-mm AA guns and all of the 8 mm machine guns were replaced by four 50-caliber 75 mm Canon de 75 mm Mle 22 or 24 AA guns and 12 13.2 mm (0.52 in) Hotchkiss machine guns on six twin mounts, two mounts where the 37 mm guns had been mounted on the foredeck and four between the funnels. The 75 mm guns had a maximum depression of 10° and a maximum elevation of 90°. They fired a 5.93-kilogram (13.1 lb) shell at a muzzle velocity of 850 m/s (2,800 ft/s) at a rate of fire of 8–18 rounds per minute and had a maximum effective ceiling of 8,000 m (26,000 ft). The Hotchkiss guns had a cyclic rate of fire of 450 rounds per minute, but the practical rate was between 200 and 250 rounds per minute to allow for reloading its 30-round magazines. They had a theoretical ceiling of 4,200 m (13,800 ft). A simple fire-control director was added for the 138 mm guns and 15 additional rangefinders were installed for use by the Rangefinding School.

Pluton spent much of 1933–1935 in dockyard hands after finishing her first round of modifications on 27 April 1933. She was refitted four times during this period to add more gunnery equipment and to rectify some of her defects. These included reinforcement of her superstructure where it had been damaged by the muzzle blast from her 138 mm guns and replacement of her corroded aluminum ladders and booms with steel ones. A high-angle fire-control director for her 75 mm guns was added, two of her 75 mm gun were converted to powered, remotely controlled mounts, gun shields were added to the 75 mm guns to protect their crews from blast and facilities for another 40 men was installed on her mine deck.

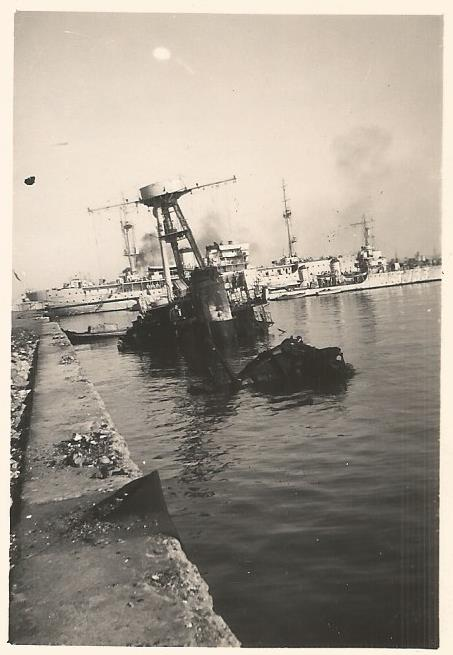
The wreckage of Pluton at Casablanca

In 1936, an experimental twin 13.2 mm gun mount with a gun shield was added between the starboard 75-mm guns and more rangefinders were added to bring her total up to 31. Her boilers and condensers were repaired in a refit between 25 November 1936 and 13 March 1937. Later that year Pluton had a major refit that involved repair of her turbines, replacement of her 138 mm fire-control director by one of the type used by the 8,000 t (7,900 long tons) light cruisers and the transfer of the foredeck 13.2 mm machine guns to positions on the forward superstructure. Her last refit, from 15 November 1938 – 15 February 1939, retubed two boilers, enclosed the AA director to protect it from the weather, improved the remote control of the 138 mm guns and added gun shields to each of the twin 13.2 mm mounts.

Pluton was transferred to Lorient on 10 May 1939 when the French Navy formed the 5^{e} Escadre there which controlled all training ships and planned to convert her into a full-time training ship as consort to the training cruiser Jeanne d'Arc on 1 June 1940. She would have been renamed La Tour d'Auvergne at that time, as the name Pluton was reserved for mine warfare ships in the French Navy.

As war approached, it was decided to retain her as a minelayer and most of the extra fire control equipment was removed. She was transferred to Brest as part of the reorganization of the 5^{e} Escadre. She sailed for Casablanca, French Morocco on 2 September with 125 Bréguet mines embarked. She was ordered to lay a defensive minefield there on 4 September, but this order was rescinded the next day, after the mines had already been fuzed, and the ship was ordered to disembark the mines. While landing the mines on 13 September one of them exploded, destroying the ship and killing 186 people. A further 73 crewmen and 47 others were injured and significant damage was caused by flying debris. Three trawlers (Etoile du Matin, Marie Merveilleuse, and Sultan) were sunk by the explosion, and the auxiliary minesweepers Charcot, Gosse, and Chellah damaged beyond repair. Two other auxiliary minesweepers, Grodin and Alcor, were damaged but able to be repaired. One gun and some armor was salvaged during the war, but demolition work did not begin until October 1952 and was completed by July 1953.

== See also ==
- HMS Adventure (M23)
- USS Terror (CM-5)
- Abdiel-class minelayer
- Robert H. Smith-class destroyer

== Bibliography ==
- Guiglini, Jean & Moreau, Albert (1992). "The First Light Cruisers of the 1922 Program: The Minelaying Cruiser Pluton, Pts. 1–2". Warship International. XXIX (2–3). International Naval Research Organization: 152–173, 225–243. ISSN 0043-0374.
- Jordan, John (2004). "The Minelaying Cruiser Pluton". In Preston, Antony (ed.). Warship 2004. London: Conway's Maritime Press. pp. 21–28. ISBN 0-85177-948-4.
