= USS Panamint =

United States Navy amphibious force command ship

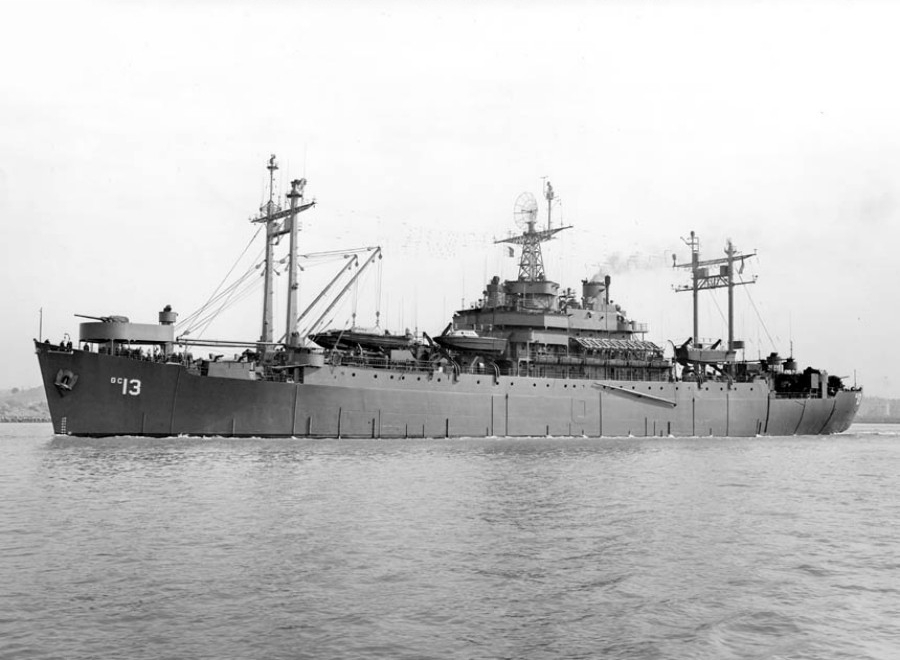
- USS Panamint

History

United States
- Name: USS Panamint
- Namesake: Panamint Range in California
- Builder: North Carolina Shipbuilding Company, Wilmington, North Carolina
- Laid down: 1 September 1943
- Launched: 9 November 1943
- Acquired: 29 February 1944
- Commissioned: 14 October 1944
- Decommissioned: January 1947
- Stricken: 1 July 1960
- Honors and awards: 1 battle star (WWII)
- Fate: Sold for scrapping, 1961

General characteristics
- Class & type: Mount McKinley-class amphibious command ship
- Displacement: 7,510 long tons (7,631 t)
- Length: 459 ft 2 in (139.95 m)
- Beam: 63 ft (19 m)
- Draft: 24 ft (7.3 m)
- Speed: 16 knots (30 km/h; 18 mph)
- Complement: 633
- Armament: 2 × 5"/38 caliber guns (2×1); 8 × 40 mm guns (4×2); 7 × 20 mm guns (7×1)

USS Panamint (AGC-13) was a Mount McKinley-class amphibious force command ship named after the Panamint Range of mountains in California. She was designed as an amphibious force flagship, a floating command post with advanced communications equipment and extensive combat information spaces to be used by the amphibious forces commander and landing force commander during large-scale operations.

== Commissioning ==
Panamint was laid down as SS Northern Light (MC hull 1354) on 1 September 1943 by the North Carolina Shipbuilding Company, Wilmington, N.C.; launched 9 November 1943; acquired by the Navy 29 February 1944; converted to a general communications vessel at the Todd-Hoboken Yard, Hoboken, New Jersey, N.J.; commissioned 14 October 1944.

== Service history ==
=== 1944–1945 ===
Following shakedown, Panamint got underway 22 November 1944 for Guadalcanal via the Panama Canal, Mare Island, and Pearl Harbor. On 1 March Panamint sailed for Cape Esperance, Guadalcanal in company with Transport Group ABLE to stage for the forthcoming invasion of Okinawa. The group proceeded to Ulithi on the 15th, and on the 27th sailed for Okinawa.

Panamint, part of the Northern Attack Force, served as flagship of Rear Admiral Lawrence F. Reifsnider, Commander Amphibious Group 4. Going in under plane attacks, on 1 April the transports took station in approach formation. At 08:00 the first assault wave passed the line of departure and landed forty minutes later. By 09:30 all the assault battalions were ashore. Only sporadic opposition was encountered, and progress was so rapid that by 22 April all organized resistance in the northern two thirds of the island had ceased.

On 10 April Admiral Richmond K. Turner designated Commander Amphibious Group 4, on board Panamint, as commander Task Force 51, Ie Shima Attack Group. Their mission was to capture and defend Ie Shima and to establish air base facilities on the island.

Six days later assault landings began on three designated beaches of this small island northwest of Okinawa. Troops of the 77th Infantry Division reached the northwest edge of the island's airfield within three hours after the first waves had landed.

By nightfall two-thirds of the island was secured, but enemy resistance was mounting. On the morning of 21 April, Rear Admiral Reifsnider sent the following message to Admiral Turner: "The American Flag Is Now Atop The Pinnacle of Ie Shima".

During the capture of Ie Shima and until mid-June 1945 Amphibious Group 4 retained responsibility for naval support of troop operations in northern Okinawa. For Panamint this was a two-and-a-half month period of nightly aerial attacks.

Kamikaze planes were in evidence from before D-Day, but the first mass enemy air attack occurred on 6 April. No ships of the Northern Attack Force were hit. Other large scale attacks came on the 12th, 16th, 22nd, and 28th. On the 30th a plane crashed into Liberty ship S. Hall Young, 800 yards from Panamint, and carrying ammunition. A bomb from the plane pierced the shell plating on both sides of the ship in the vicinity of the No. 5 hold. The plane itself struck the after boom and fell into the hold, starting a fire. Panamint’s fire and rescue party boarded the S. Hall Young and extinguished the fire.

On 6 May when a plane approached Panamint from the starboard beam, Panamint, her sister ships, and shore batteries on Ie Shima commenced firing. The plane circled to port for a suicide dive, but the anti-aircraft fire proved effective. He overshot Panamint, splashing 1500 yards off her port bow.

On the 11th two enemy planes were sighted low over the water approaching the Ie Shima transport area on the starboard beam. The planes were following an evasive course to get through the screening vessels which had commenced firing.

Panamint opened fire on one of the planes, which dropped a torpedo. Panamint put her rudder hard right at full speed and swung on the anchor to a position paralleling the course of the approaching plane and torpedo. The plane erupted into flames, passed 150 yards astern of Panamint, glanced off the cargo boom of Dutch ship Tjisadane, and splashed into the sea. The torpedo passed the stern of the ship. The second plane closed on the starboard bow, dropped a torpedo which passed to starboard and cleared Panamint’s stern by 30 feet.

In the first 45 days, the ships of Amphibious Group 4 were exposed to many "Red Alerts". Only nine days were free of enemy air raids. Throughout this ordeal Panamint directed the Combat Air Patrol attacks in repelling the enemy. On 15 June Panamint steamed to Saipan and then on to Pearl Harbor, arriving 8 July.

On 12 August 1945 the ship sailed for Adak, Aleutian Islands, where she reported for duty to Commander North Pacific Force and Area. On 29 August Vice Admiral Frank Jack Fletcher, Commander North Pacific Force and Area, hoisted his flag on Panamint. Two days later she left Adak with the 9th Fleet and headed west for the occupation of northern Japan.

On 7 September the flagship pulled away from the anchored task force and proceeded to a rendezvous point to await the Japanese surrender ship from nearby Ōminato Naval Base. On schedule a Japanese destroyer escort bore down the Tsugaru Strait carrying emissaries to hand over northern Japan, and pilots to guide the American ships through Japanese waters. The commissioners were quickly transferred to Panamint. Commodore R. E. Robinson Jr., represented Vice Admiral Fletcher, and Rear Admiral Zensuke Kanome was the head of the Japanese delegation.

On the morning of the 8th the massive naval force got underway led by a Japanese frigate through the mineswept channel and Tsugaru Strait leading to Ōminato Anchorage. Panamint moored off the shattered naval base that afternoon, and the following morning the formal occupation ceremony was held on her decks. Surrender had come so quickly that two weeks passed before American troops arrived to occupy the countryside. On 20 September Panamint returned to Adak, and proceeded to Kodiak on 2 October.

Panamint next served as flagship for Rear Admiral Arthur Dewey Struble, Commander Minecraft Pacific Fleet. Admiral Struble transferred his flag to Panamint on 20 November 1945 from the minelayer Terror (CM-5). Upon leaving this command she departed from Sasebo, Japan, arriving at San Francisco on 28 March 1946.

=== Post-War ===
On 1 July 1946 she covered Joint Army-Navy Task Force I's "Operation Crossroads", the atomic bomb test at Bikini Atoll, where she served as floating headquarters for congressional, scientific, and U.N. observers.

By directive dated January 1947 Panamint was placed out of commission in reserve, U.S. Pacific Reserve Fleet, and berthed at San Diego, California. Panamint was struck from the Naval Vessel Register on 1 July 1960, approved for disposal on 4 November 1960 and scrapped in 1961.

Panamint received one battle star for World War II service.
