= German submarine U-7 (1935) =

German World War II submarine

Coordinates: 54°52′00″N 19°29′08″E

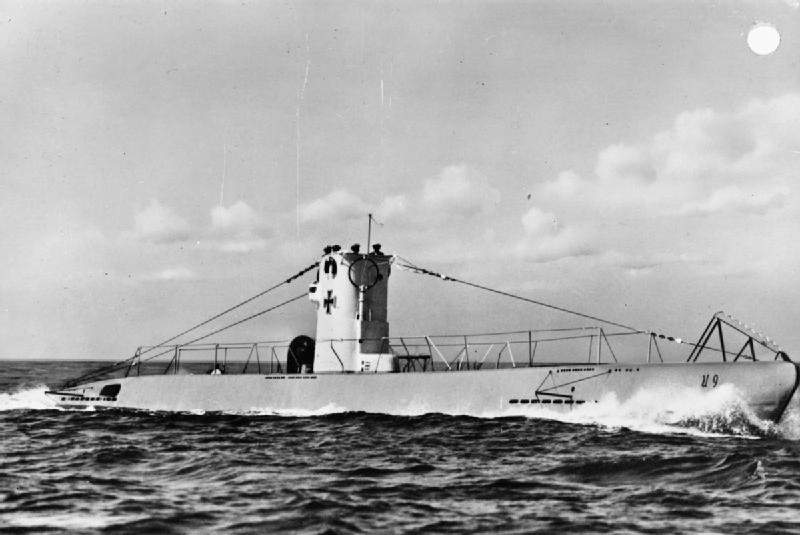
- U-9, a typical Type IIB boat

History

Nazi Germany
- Name: U-7
- Ordered: 20 July 1934
- Builder: Germaniawerft, Kiel
- Yard number: 541
- Laid down: 11 March 1935
- Launched: 29 June 1935
- Commissioned: 18 July 1935
- Fate: Sunk 18 February 1944 west of Pillau. 29 dead

General characteristics
- Class & type: Type IIB coastal submarine
- Displacement: 279 t (275 long tons) surfaced; 328 t (323 long tons) submerged
- Length: 42.70 m (140 ft 1 in)
- Beam: 4.08 m (13 ft 5 in) (o/a); 4.00 m (13 ft 1 in) (pressure hull)
- Draught: 3.90 m (12 ft 10 in)
- Installed power: 700 PS (510 kW; 690 bhp) (diesels); 410 PS (300 kW; 400 shp) (electric)
- Propulsion: 2 shafts; 2 × diesel engines; 2 × electric motors
- Speed: 13 knots (24 km/h; 15 mph) surfaced; 7 knots (13 km/h; 8.1 mph) submerged
- Range: 1,800 nmi (3,300 km; 2,100 mi) at 12 knots (22 km/h; 14 mph) surfaced; 35–43 nmi (65–80 km; 40–49 mi) at 4 knots (7.4 km/h; 4.6 mph) submerged
- Test depth: 80 m (260 ft)
- Complement: 3 officers, 22 men
- Armament: 3 × 53.3 cm (21 in) torpedo tubes; 5 × torpedoes or up to 12 TMA or 18 TMB mines; 1 × 2 cm (0.79 in) C/30 anti-aircraft gun

Service record
- Part of: U-boat School Flotilla; 1 September 1935 – 1 February 1940; 1 March – 30 June 1940; 21st U-boat Flotilla; 1 July 1940 – 18 February 1944
- Identification codes: M 16 723
- Commanders: Kptlt. Kurt Freiwald; 18 July 1935 – 3 October 1937; Oblt.z.S. / Kptlt. Otto Salman; 10 February 1938 – 5 February 1939; 31 May – 2 July 1939; 2 August – 1 October 1939; 25 October – 13 November 1939; Kptlt. Werner Heidel; 18 December 1938 – 13 October 1939; Oblt.z.S. / Kptlt. Karl Schrott; 14 October 1939 – October 1940; Oblt.z.S. Günther Reeder; October 1940 – January 1941; February 1941 – 29 March 1941; Oblt.z.S. Ernst-Ulrich Brüller; January - February 1941; Oblt.z.S. Hans-Günther Kuhlmann; 30 March – 16 June 1941; Oblt.z.S. / Kptlt. Heinrich Schmid; 17 June 1941 – 15 January 1942; Oblt.z.S. Siegfried Koitschka; 16 January – 7 October 1942; Lt.z.S. Otto Hübschen; September – December 1942; Oblt.z.S. Hans Schrenk; 8 October 1942 – January 1944; Oblt.z.S. Günther Loeschcke; January – 18 February 1944
- Operations: 6 patrols: 1st patrol: 24 August – 8 September 1939; 2nd patrol: 18 September – 3 October 1939; 3rd patrol: 3 – 8 March 1940; 4th patrol: 14 – 19 March 1940; 5th patrol: 3 – 21 April 1940; 6th patrol: 7 – 18 May 1940
- Victories: 1 merchant ship sunk (2,694 GRT); 1 merchant ship total loss (1,830 GRT)

German submarine U-7 was a Type IIB U-boat of Nazi Germany's Kriegsmarine, based out of Kiel during World War II. It was one of the smaller versions, and was first launched on 29 June 1935 with a crew of 29. Its first commander was Kurt Freiwald. U-7 would have 16 commanders over the course of its service, the last being Günther Loeschcke.

During the war U-7 was responsible for sinking two vessels.

On 18 February 1944, west of Pillau, U-7 sank in what is believed to have been a malfunction during a diving manoeuvre. There were no survivors.

== Design ==
German Type IIB submarines were enlarged versions of the original Type IIs. U-7 had a displacement of 279 tonnes (275 long tons) when at the surface and 328 tonnes (323 long tons) while submerged. Officially, the standard tonnage was 250 long tons (254 t), however. The U-boat had a total length of 42.70 m (140 ft 1 in), a pressure hull length of 28.20 m (92 ft 6 in), a beam of 4.08 m (13 ft 5 in), a height of 8.60 m (28 ft 3 in), and a draught of 3.90 m (12 ft 10 in). The submarine was powered by two MWM RS 127 S four-stroke, six-cylinder diesel engines of 700 metric horsepower (510 kW; 690 shp) for cruising, two Siemens-Schuckert PG VV 322/36 double-acting electric motors producing a total of 460 metric horsepower (340 kW; 450 shp) for use while submerged. She had two shafts and two 0.85 m (3 ft) propellers. The boat was capable of operating at depths of up to 80–150 metres (260–490 ft).

The submarine had a maximum surface speed of 12 knots (22 km/h; 14 mph) and a maximum submerged speed of 7 knots (13 km/h; 8.1 mph). When submerged, the boat could operate for 35–42 nautical miles (65–78 km; 40–48 mi) at 4 knots (7.4 km/h; 4.6 mph); when surfaced, she could travel 3,800 nautical miles (7,000 km; 4,400 mi) at 8 knots (15 km/h; 9.2 mph). U-7 was fitted with three 53.3 cm (21 in) torpedo tubes at the bow, five torpedoes or up to twelve Type A torpedo mines, and a 2 cm (0.79 in) anti-aircraft gun. The boat had a complement of twentyfive.

== Service history ==
U-7 was ordered on 20 July 1934, i.e. in violation of the Versailles Treaty, which denied Germany possession of submarines. The U-boat was not laid down until 11 March 1935, and launched on 29 June 1935, within weeks of the Anglo-German Naval Agreement, which granted Germany parity with the British Empire in submarines.

Commissioned on 18 July 1935 with Kapitänleutnant Kurt Freiwald in command, U-7 mainly served as a training boat except for two brief deployments during the Invasion of Poland in 1939 and Operation Weserübung in 1940.

On 18 February 1944, west of Pillau, U-7 sank in what is believed to have been a malfunction during a diving manoeuvre. There were no survivors.

== Summary of raiding history ==
Date	Name	Nationality	Tonnage (GRT)	Fate
22 September 1939	Akenside	United Kingdom	2,694	Sunk
29 September 1939	Takstaas	Norway	1,830	Total loss

== Bibliography ==
- Busch, Rainer; Röll, Hans-Joachim (1999). German U-boat commanders of World War II : a biographical dictionary. Translated by Brooks, Geoffrey. London, Annapolis, Md: Greenhill Books, Naval Institute Press. ISBN 1-55750-186-6.
- Gröner, Eric; Jung, Dieter; Maass, Martin (1991). German Warships 1815-1945: U-boats and Mine Warfare Vessels. Vol. 2. Translated by Thomas, Keith; Magowan, Rachel. London: Conway Maritime Press. ISBN 0-85177-593-4.
- Kemp, Paul (1997). U-Boats Destroyed - German Submarine Losses in the World Wars. Arms & Armour. ISBN 1-85409-515-3.
- Neistlé, Axel (2014). German U-Boat Losses during World War II: Details of Destruction (2 ed.). Havertown: Frontline Books (published 30 June 2014).
