= SS Martti Ragnar =

Coordinates: 58°24′N 8°48′E

History
- Owner: 1903 A/S D/S Norden (P. Brown), Copenhagen; 1934 Loviisa Rederi A/B, Loviisa
- Builder: Helsingørs Jernskibs- og Maskinbyggeri A/S, Helsingør, Denmark
- Yard number: 97
- Acquired: 1934
- In service: August 1903
- Fate: Sunk, 23 September 1939

General characteristics
- Tonnage: 2,130 GRT
- Length: 97.87 m (321 ft 1 in)
- Beam: 13.18 m (43 ft 3 in)
- Draft: 5.84 m (19 ft 2 in)
- Propulsion: triple expansion steam engine
- Speed: 8 knots (15 km/h; 9.2 mph)
- Capacity: 3,950 tons

SS Martti Ragnar was a Finnish steam freighter own by Ragnar Nordström and named after his son Martti-Ragnar Nordström. In 1939, while carrying a cargo of cellulose, sulfite and woodpulp from Kemi to Ellesmere Port in England, she was sunk by the German submarine U-4 on 22 September in Skagerrak.
