= German submarine U-4 (1935) =

German World War II submarine

Coordinates: 54°32′N 18°33′E

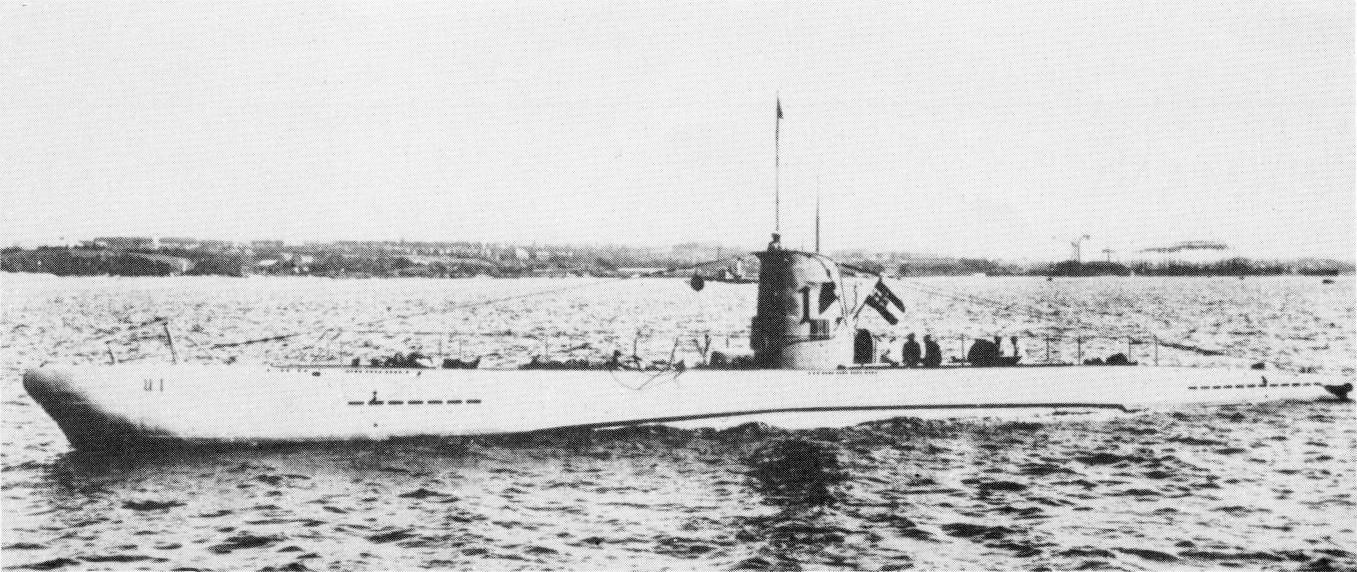
- U-1, the first Type II boat

History

Nazi Germany
- Name: U-4
- Ordered: 2 February 1935
- Builder: Deutsche Werke, Kiel
- Cost: 1,500,000 Reichsmark
- Yard number: 239
- Laid down: 11 February 1935
- Launched: 31 July 1935
- Commissioned: 17 August 1935
- Fate: Stricken 1 August 1944, Gotenhafen, scrapped in 1945

General characteristics
- Class & type: Type IIA coastal submarine
- Displacement: 254 t (250 long tons) surfaced; 303 t (298 long tons) submerged; 381 t (375 long tons) total
- Length: 40.90 m (134 ft 2 in) (o/a); 27.80 m (91 ft 2 in) (pressure hull)
- Beam: 4.08 m (13 ft 5 in) (o/a); 4.00 m (13 ft 1 in) (pressure hull)
- Height: 8.60 m (28 ft 3 in)
- Draught: 3.83 m (12 ft 7 in)
- Installed power: 700 PS (510 kW; 690 shp) (diesels); 360 PS (260 kW; 360 shp) (electric)
- Propulsion: 2 × propeller shafts; 2 × 0.85 m (2 ft 9 in) three-bladed propellers; 2 × diesel engines; 2 × double-acting electric motors
- Speed: 13 knots (24 km/h; 15 mph) surfaced; 6.9 knots (12.8 km/h; 7.9 mph) submerged
- Range: 1,050 nmi (1,940 km; 1,210 mi) at 12 knots (22 km/h; 14 mph) surfaced; 35 nmi (65 km; 40 mi) at 4 knots (7.4 km/h; 4.6 mph) submerged
- Test depth: 80 m (260 ft)
- Complement: 3 officers, 22 men
- Armament: 3 × 53.3 cm (21 in) torpedo tubes; 5 × torpedoes or up to 12 TMA or 18 TMB mines; 1 × 2 cm (0.79 in) C/30 anti-aircraft gun

Service record
- Part of: U-boat School Flotilla; 1 August 1935 – 1 February 1940; 1 March – 1 April 1940; 1 May – 30 June 1940; 21st U-boat Flotilla; 1 July 1940 – 31 July 1944
- Identification codes: M 13 167
- Commanders: Oblt.z.S. / Kptlt. Hannes Weingärtner; 17 August 1935 – 29 September 1937; Oblt.z.S. / Kptlt. Hans-Wilhelm von Dresky; 30 September 1937 – 28 October 1938; Oblt.z.S. / Kptlt. Harro von Klot-Heydenfeldt; 29 October 1938 – 16 January 1940; Oblt.z.S. Hans-Peter Hinsch; 17 January – 7 June 1940; Oblt.z.S. Heinz-Otto Schultze; 8 June – 28 July 1940; Oblt.z.S. Hans-Jürgen Zetzsche; 29 July 1940 – 2 February 1941; Oblt.z.S. Hinrich-Oscar Bernbeck; 3 February – 8 December 1941; Oblt.z.S. Wolfgang Leimkühler; 9 December 1941 – 15 June 1942; Lt.z.S. / Oblt.z.S. Friedrich-Wilhelm Marienfeld; 16 June 1942 – 23 January 1943; Joachim Düppe; 24 January – 31 May 1943; Oblt.z.S. Paul Sander; 1 June – 22 August 1943; Lt.z.S. / Oblt.z.S. Herbert Mumm; 23 August 1943 – May 1944; Oblt.z.S. Hubert Rieger; May - 9 July 1944
- Operations: 4 patrols: 1st patrol: 4 – 14 September 1939; 2nd patrol: 19 – 29 September 1939; 3rd patrol: 16 – 29 March 1940; 4th patrol: 4 – 14 April 1940
- Victories: 3 merchant ships sunk (5,133 GRT); 1 warship sunk (1,090 tons)

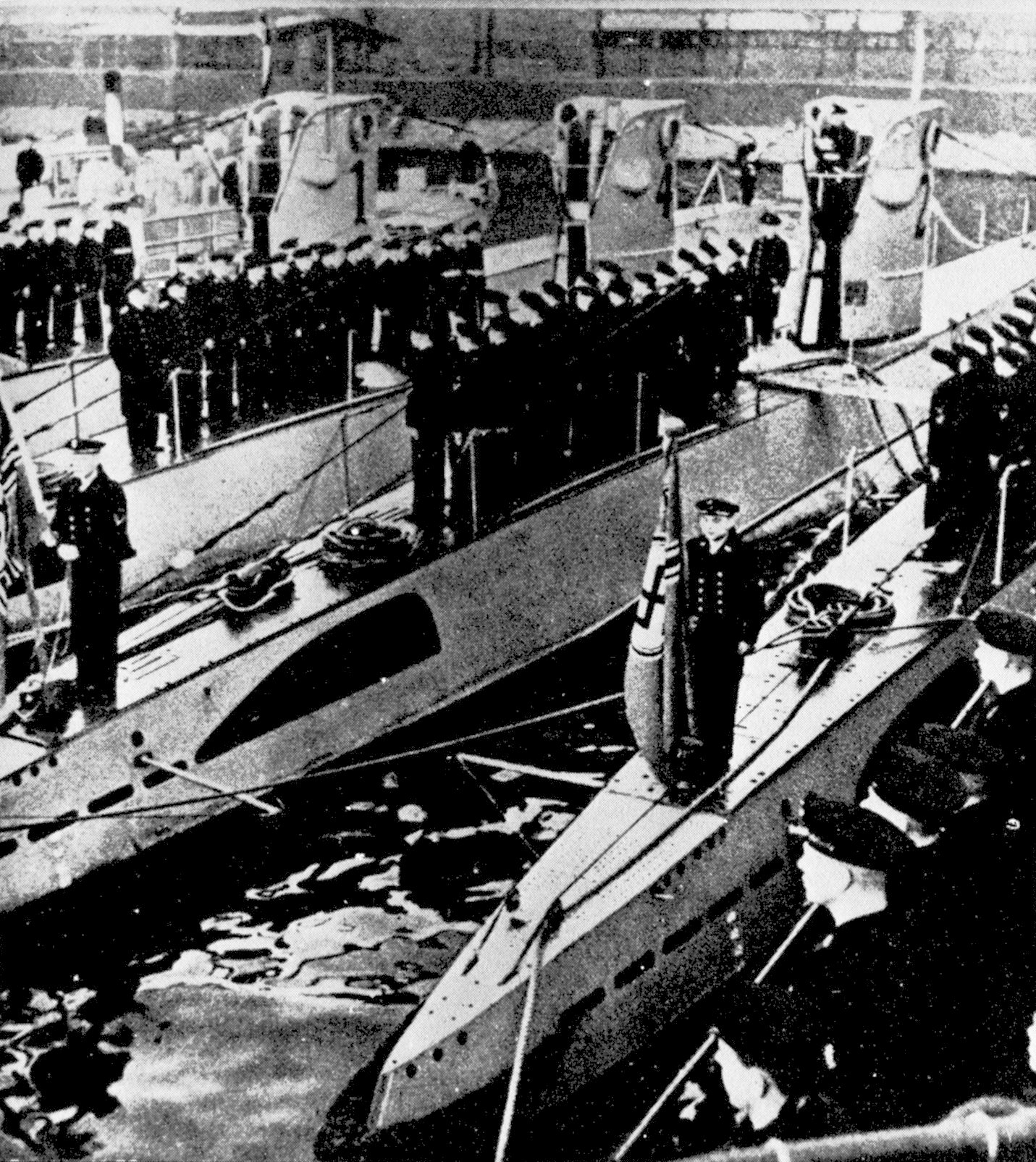
Ubooty(Historia str.235)

German submarine U-4 was a Type IIA U-boat of Nazi Germany's Kriegsmarine before and during World War II. She was one of the longest lasting German submarines of the period, primarily since half of her time was spent on training duties in the Baltic Sea.

Commissioned on 17 August 1935, she was one of the first batch of Type IIA boats constructed following the Anglo-German Naval Agreement that repealed the terms of the Treaty of Versailles which ended the First World War and stated that Germany was not permitted to possess submarines. Built at the Deutsche Werke in Kiel as yard number 239, she was a highly sought after command before the outbreak of the Second World War in 1939. Once the war had begun however, she rapidly became obsolete. Before she was superseded, she carried out four combat patrols, mainly in support of the Norwegian campaign. She was the most successful Type IIA boat by tonnage of shipping sunk, sinking three freighters and one submarine for 5,133 GRT and 1,090 tons, respectively.

== Design ==
German Type II submarines were based on the Finnish submarine Vesikko. U-4 had a displacement of 254 tonnes (250 long tons) when at the surface and 303 tonnes (298 long tons) while submerged. Officially, the standard tonnage was 250 long tons (250 t), however. The U-boat had a total length of 40.90 m (134 ft 2 in), a pressure hull length of 27.80 m (91 ft 2 in), a beam of 4.08 m (13 ft 5 in), a height of 8.60 m (28 ft 3 in), and a draught of 3.83 m (12 ft 7 in). The submarine was powered by two MWM RS 127 S four-stroke, six-cylinder diesel engines of 700 metric horsepower (510 kW; 690 shp) for cruising, two Siemens-Schuckert PG VV 322/36 double-acting electric motors producing a total of 360 metric horsepower (260 kW; 360 shp) for use while submerged. She had two shafts and two 0.85 m (3 ft) propellers. The boat was capable of operating at depths of up to 80–150 metres (260–490 ft).

The submarine had a maximum surface speed of 13 knots (24 km/h; 15 mph) and a maximum submerged speed of 6.9 knots (12.8 km/h; 7.9 mph). When submerged, the boat could operate for 35 nautical miles (65 km; 40 mi) at 4 knots (7.4 km/h; 4.6 mph); when surfaced, she could travel 1,600 nautical miles (3,000 km; 1,800 mi) at 8 knots (15 km/h; 9.2 mph). U-4 was fitted with three 53.3 cm (21 in) torpedo tubes at the bow, five torpedoes or up to twelve Type A torpedo mines, and a 2 cm (0.79 in) anti-aircraft gun. The boat had a complement of 25.

== War patrols ==
=== First and second patrols ===
U-4 departed Wilhelmshaven for her first patrol on 4 September 1939, in the aftermath of the declaration of war. Given her small size, she only covered the area to the south of Norway and into the North Sea west of Denmark and along the Dutch coast, and returned unsuccessful on 14 September. A second patrol later in the month yielded greater dividends, when she spotted three neutral vessels heading to Britain through the North Sea and sank them on consecutive days; the Martti Ragnar on the 22nd, the Walma on the 23rd and the Gertrud Bratt on the 24th. Martti Ragnar and Walma were both boarded and sunk with scuttling charges, and U-4 towed the lifeboats to the coast where their crews were taken aboard by fishing vessels. Gertrud Bratt was also boarded, but with no scuttling charges remaining, U-4 sunk her using a G7a torpedo. The crew of Gertrud Bratt reported that U-4 had promised to tow the lifeboats as well, but was forced to dive upon sighting an aircraft.

=== Third and fourth patrols ===
Her later two patrols were both in support of the German invasion of Norway. It was during this operation that she was able to sink the British submarine HMS Thistle. The engagement was a lengthy one, as U-4 was a small coastal craft with poor endurance. When Thistle attacked and barely missed U-4 with a four-torpedo spread on 9 April, it gave the German submarine a chance to evade and hunt her attacker, finally catching and sinking the British vessel with all hands as she recharged her batteries on the surface a day later.

== The Baltic ==
Once Norway was subdued, it became increasingly obvious that U-4 and her sisters were not capable of either outfighting or outrunning enemy craft, neither did they possess the range and endurance necessary to have a major impact on Allied shipping. In response, on 1 July 1940, these boats were relegated to the 21st U-boat Flotilla, and served until 1944 as training craft in the Baltic Sea. Although some of her sisters saw action later against the Soviets, U-4 did not, eventually being retired from all service at Gotenhafen (now known as Gdynia in Poland), on 1 August 1944, and then scrapped for parts sometime in 1945.

== Summary of raiding history ==
Date	Name	Nationality	Tonnage (Note: Merchant ship tonnages are in gross register tons. Military vessels are listed by tons displacement.)	Fate
22 September 1939	Martti Ragnar	Finland	2,262	Sunk
23 September 1939	Walma	Finland	1,361	Sunk
24 September 1939	Gertrud Bratt	Sweden	1,510	Sunk
10 April 1940	HMS Thistle	Royal Navy	1,090	Sunk

== Bibliography ==
- Busch, Rainer; Röll, Hans-Joachim (1999). German U-boat commanders of World War II : a biographical dictionary. Translated by Brooks, Geoffrey. London, Annapolis, Md: Greenhill Books, Naval Institute Press. ISBN 1-55750-186-6.
- Gröner, Erich; Jung, Dieter; Maass, Martin (1991). U-boats and Mine Warfare Vessels. German Warships 1815–1945. Vol. 2. Translated by Thomas, Keith; Magowan, Rachel. London: Conway Maritime Press. ISBN 0-85177-593-4.
- Sharpe, Peter (1998). U-Boat Fact File. Great Britain: Midland Publishing. ISBN 1-85780-072-9.
