= September 1939 =

Month of 1939

<<	September 1939					>>
Su	Mo	Tu	We	Th	Fr	Sa
					1	2
3	4	5	6	7	8	9
10	11	12	13	14	15	16
17	18	19	20	21	22	23
24	25	26	27	28	29	30

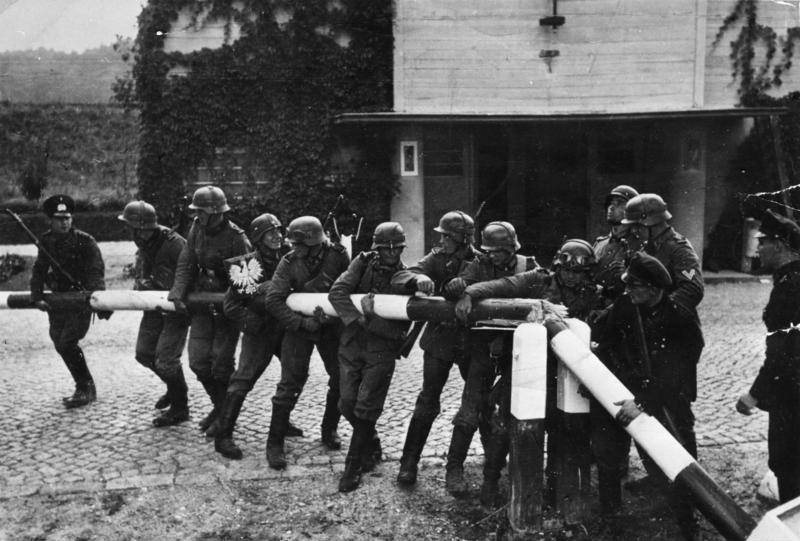
September 1: World War II breaks out in Europe with Nazi Germany's invasion of Poland

World War II was the biggest and deadliest war in history, involving more than 30 countries. Sparked by the 1939 German invasion of Poland, the war dragged on for six bloody years until the Allies defeated the Axis powers of Germany, Japan and Italy in 1945. The principal belligerents were the Axis powers—Germany, Italy, and Japan—and the Allies—China, Great Britain, the United States, the Soviet Union (Russia), and France.

The following events occurred in September 1939:

== September 1, 1939 (Friday) ==
- 1:40 AM: At the Polish-German border post in Jeziorki, near Piła (Schneidemühl), an exchange of fire occurred between several dozen German saboteurs and a Polish border patrol, killing 38-year-old Polish Corporal Piotr Konieczka.
- 3:30 AM: A Polish border patrol on bikes was fired on by German soldiers who had crossed the border near Krzepice.
- 4:00 AM: The Polish Post Office in Danzig had its telephone and power lines cut.
- 4:30 AM: A bridge in Praszka was blown up by Corporal Józef Górecki to stop the German soldiers crossing to the Polish side.
- 4:34 AM: At the Tczew bridge, an important railway connection between East Prussia and the Reich, German dive bombers commanded by Bruno Dilley began bombing Polish sapper positions, to prevent the bridge from being blown up. However, the bridge was blown up around 6.00 AM, marking the German invasion of Poland.
- 4:44 AM: The German SMS Schleswig-Holstein opened fire on a garrison in Westerplatte, the first cannon shots of World War II.
- Early morning: The Luftwaffe began bombing raids on airfields, ships and troops.
- Early morning: The series of battles collectively known as the Battle of the Border began in Poland.
- Early morning: The Slovak Republic began a limited invasion of disputed Polish territories and met little resistance.
- 6.30 AM: Warsaw radio and all Polish radio stations broadcast a special message about the beginning of the war.
- About 6:30 AM: Aerial combat occurred near Krakow. A Polish PZL P.11c, piloted by Mieczysław Medwecki, was shot down by a Junkers Ju 87, piloted by Frank Neubert. A German Dornier Do 17 E, of the 77th Luftwaffe Bomber Regiment, was shot down by a Polish PZL P.11c, piloted by Władysław Gnyś. As it fell to earth, it collided with a second German bomber, which also crashed. They were the first Allied and Axis aircraft shot down during World War II. Gnyś and Neubert would meet decades later, in 1989.
- About 6.30 AM: From the observation point in Mława, a report was received by the staff of the Polish Pursuit Brigade about a bombing expedition headed for Warsaw. Colonel Pawlikowski ordered the start of the entire Brigade. At about 7:00 a.m. about 54 Polish fighters attacked in the Bugo-Narew region about 80 He 111 from LG 1 and KG 27 "Boelcke" in the cover of 20 Bf 109 from I (Z) / LG 1. German bombers are scattered, dropped bombs and hastily turned back. The expedition does not reach Warsaw
- Polish President Ignacy Mościcki declared a state of emergency.
- Benito Mussolini ordered his ambassador in Berlin to ask for a telegram releasing Italy from any obligation to take part in the war. At 9:40 a.m. Hitler obliged with a cordial telegram saying he did not "expect to need Italy's military support in these circumstances."
- About 10:00 AM: German 4th Panzer Division makes a second attack on Mokra, losing 12 tanks in combat with Wołyńska Cavalry Brigade, later losing a total of about 50 tanks and 150 other vehicles over 1-3 September.
- About 11:00 AM: Hitler appeared before the Reichstag to explain his decision. Hitler was wearing a field-gray uniform instead of his usual brown jacket, and he declared toward the end: "From now on I am just the first soldier of the German Reich. I have once more put on that coat that was the most sacred and dear to me. I will not take it off again until victory is assured, or I will not survive the outcome."
- About 1:00 PM: A second German attack on Westerplatte is repulsed with heavy German losses.
- Polish ships took minor damage in the Battle of the Danzig Bay.
- Germany annexed the Free City of Danzig. Albert Forster abrogated the constitution of the Free City of Danzig and declared the region's reincorporation into Germany.
- US President Franklin D. Roosevelt said at a press conference that "every effort" would be made by his administration to stay out of the war.
- Shortly after 6:00 PM: British Prime Minister Neville Chamberlain spoke before the House of Commons: "It now only remains for us to set our teeth and to enter upon this struggle, which we ourselves earnestly endeavoured to avoid, with determination to see it through to the end", he declared. "We shall enter it with a clear conscience, with the support of the Dominions and the British Empire, and the moral approval of the greater part of the world".
- 7.00 PM: The Polish Post Office in Danzig surrendered after fighting for 15 hours. Its director, Jan Machoń, carried a white flag but was shot down. Most of the defenders would be executed a month later.
- 9.00 PM: British Ambassador to Germany Sir Nevile Henderson handed an ultimatum to Joachim von Ribbentrop. It declared that unless the British government received "satisfactory assurances" that Germany was prepared to withdraw from Polish territory, "His Majesty's Government will without hesitation fulfill their obligation to Poland". One hour later, the French ambassador delivered an identical note.
- The paper "On Continued Gravitational Contraction" by J. Robert Oppenheimer and his student Hartland Snyder is published, introducing the pioneering Oppenheimer–Snyder model of black hole formation.
- The paper "The Mechanism of Nuclear Fission" by Niels Bohr and John Archibald Wheeler is published in Physical Review.
- The second Uranverein (Uranium Club) was founded, beginning the German nuclear program during World War II.
- The first International Film Festival (the forerunner to the Cannes Film Festival), scheduled to open on this day, was postponed indefinitely. Only a single film was screened, The Hunchback of Notre Dame.
- The mystery-adventure film The Adventures of Sherlock Holmes, starring Basil Rathbone, was released.
- Born: Lily Tomlin, actress and comedian, in Detroit, Michigan

== September 2, 1939 (Saturday) ==
- The state of emergency in Poland was upgraded to a state of war.
- The Polish army conducted the Raid on Fraustadt.
- The Battle of Borowa Góra began.
- A lone Polish PZL.23B light bomber attacks a German chemical factory in Ohlau, causing minor damage. It is the first air raid on German soil in World War II.
- 3 PM: The Parliament of Second Polish Republic gathers for the last time.
- Italy proposed a peace conference between Germany, Italy, Britain, France and Poland to address the Danzig-Polish crisis.
- French Prime Minister Édouard Daladier addressed the Chamber of Deputies reviewing the events of the past several days and France's commitment to intervene in Poland's defense. "This is the question I lay before the French nation, and all nations", Daladier said. "At the very moment of the aggression against Poland, what value has the guarantee, once more renewed, given for our eastern frontier, for our Alsace, for our Lorraine, after repudiation of the guarantees given in turn to Austria, Czechoslovakia, and Poland? More powerful through their conquests ... the aggressors would soon turn against France with all their forces. Thus, our honor is but the pledge of our own society. It is not that abstract and obsolete form of honor of which conquerors speak to justify their deeds of violence; it is the dignity of a peaceful people, which bears hatred toward no other people in the world and which never embarks upon a war save only for the sake of its freedom and of its life."
- Ireland declared neutrality in the war as well as a state of emergency.
- The Nazis established Stutthof prison camp near the former territory of Danzig. In January 1942 it would be re-designated a concentration camp.
- At 7:44 p.m. Neville Chamberlain informed the House of Commons that no reply had yet been received from Germany regarding last night's ultimatum. Regarding the Italian peace proposal he said he appreciated the effort, but "His Majesty's Government, for their part, would find it impossible to take part in a conference while Poland is being subjected to invasion, her towns are under bombardment and Danzig is being made the subject of a unilateral settlement by force. His Majesty's Government will, as stated yesterday, be bound to take action unless the German forces are withdrawn from Polish territory."

== September 3, 1939 (Sunday) ==
- At 9:00 a.m. Britain gave Germany a deadline of 11:00 a.m. to announce that it was prepared to withdraw its troops from Poland or else a state of war would exist between Britain and Germany. The deadline passed with no response.
- At 11:15 a.m. Neville Chamberlain announced on BBC Radio that Britain and Germany were at war. "You can imagine what a bitter blow it is to me that all my long struggle to win peace has failed", Chamberlain said, sounding dispirited. "Yet I cannot believe that there is anything more or anything different that I could have done and that would have been more successful ... We and France are today, in fulfillment of our obligations, going to the aid of Poland, who is so bravely resisting this wicked and unprovoked attack upon her people. We have a clear conscience. We have done all that any country could do to establish peace, but a situation in which no word given by Germany's ruler could be trusted and no people or country could feel themselves safe had become intolerable. And now that we have resolved to finish it, I know that you will all play your part with calmness and courage."
- At 12:00 noon, France gave Germany an ultimatum similar to Britain's with a 5:00 p.m. deadline. The deadline came and went with no reply, so France's war on Germany became official.
- Neville Chamberlain addressed the House shortly past noon and called it "a sad day for all of us, and to none is it sadder than to me. Everything that I have worked for, everything that I have hoped for, everything that I have believed in during my public life, has crashed into ruins. There is only one thing left for me to do; that is, to devote what strength and powers I have to forwarding the victory of the cause for which we have to sacrifice so much. I cannot tell what part I may be allowed to play myself; I trust I may live to see the day when Hitlerism has been destroyed and a liberated Europe has been re-established." Winston Churchill agreed that it was a sad day, but said "at the present time there is another note which may be present, and that is a feeling of thankfulness that, if these great trials were to come upon our Island, there is a generation of Britons here now ready to prove itself not unworthy of the days of yore and not unworthy of those great men, the fathers of our land, who laid the foundations of our laws and shaped the greatness of our country. This is not a question of fighting for Danzig or fighting for Poland. We are fighting to save the whole world from the pestilence of Nazi tyranny and in defence of all that is most sacred to man."
- U.S. President Franklin D. Roosevelt gave a fireside chat on the European war. "Let no man or woman thoughtlessly or falsely talk of America sending its armies to European fields", the president said. "At this moment there is being prepared a proclamation of American neutrality. This would have been done even if there had been no neutrality statute on the books, for this proclamation is in accordance with international law and in accordance with American policy ... I hope the United States will keep out of this war. I believe that it will. And I give you assurance and reassurance that every effort of your Government will be directed toward that end."
- Ireland enacted the Emergency Powers Act.
- At 6:00 p.m. George VI addressed the British Empire by radio. "For the second time in the lives of most of us we are at war", the king said. "Over and over again we have tried to find a peaceful way out of the differences between ourselves and those who are now our enemies. But it has been in vain ... The task will be hard. There may be dark days ahead and war is no longer confined to the battlefield but we can only do the right as we see the right and reverently commend our cause to God. If one and all be resolutely faithful today, ready for whatever service and sacrifice it may demand, with God's help we shall prevail."
- The three-day Battle of Grudziądz ended with Polish withdrawal from the city.
- Australian Prime Minister Robert Menzies made a radio address announcing that the country was at war with Germany. "Fellow Australians", Menzies began, "it is my melancholy duty to inform you officially, that in consequence of a persistence by Germany in her invasion of Poland, Great Britain has declared war upon her and that, as a result, Australia is also at war."
- The passenger liner Athenia was torpedoed and sunk in the Western Approaches by the German submarine U-30, the first British ship sunk by the Kriegsmarine in World War II. Around 117 civilian passengers and crew were killed.
- Ten RAF Whitley bombers flew over the Ruhr region during the night and dropped millions of leaflets. The leaflets told Germans that their country's wishes could have been settled peacefully but instead their government had "condemned you to mass murder, starvation and the hardships of war which you can never hope to win. Hitler has cheated not us but you." Breezes scattered the leaflets so widely that some of them were found in the Netherlands.
- Hitler issued Directive No. 2, Hostilities in the West.
- Newfoundland declares war on Germany.

== September 4, 1939 (Monday) ==
- In the early hours of the morning in New Zealand, Governor-General Lord Galway signed the country's declaration of war on Germany and backdated it to 9:30 p.m. the previous night, the equivalent of 11 a.m. on September 3 in England so it would match the time that Chamberlain declared war.
- Winston Churchill accepted Chamberlain's offer to join his war cabinet as First Lord of the Admiralty. Churchill now held the same position he had at the outbreak of World War I.
- Fifteen Blenheims and fourteen Wellingtons conducted a bombing raid on German warships at Wilhelmshaven and Brunsbüttel. The German cruiser Emden was damaged but seven bombers were shot down, mostly from anti-aircraft fire but at least one by a Bf 109 of II/JG 77 – the first Luftwaffe victory against the RAF.
- The Battle of the Border ended
- The four-day Battle of Pszczyna ended in German victory.
- The Battle of Różan began.
- Katowice massacre: German soldiers and Freikorps massacred some 80 Polish civilian defenders, including Boy and Girl Scouts, in the city of Katowice.
- Częstochowa massacre: German soldiers massacred some 1,140 Polish civilians, including 150 Jews, in the city of Częstochowa on 4–6 September.
- Nepal declared war on Germany.
- Egypt broke off diplomatic relations with Germany.

== September 5, 1939 (Tuesday) ==
- The five-day Battle of Tuchola Forest ended in German victory.
- The Battle of Piotrków Trybunalski began.
- The United States officially declared neutrality in the European war.
- Jan Smuts replaced J. B. M. Hertzog as Prime Minister of South Africa after Parliament rejected Hertzog's legislation advocating neutrality in the European conflict.
- The National Registration Act was given Royal Assent.
- Since Monday was Labor Day, the New York Stock Exchange opened for the first day of trading since Britain and France declared war. Stocks surged almost 10% on speculation of European demand for industrial products.
- A diplomatic incident between Britain and the United States occurred at Port Said, Egypt when British authorities removed two German engineers from the Don Isidro, a Philippine motorship under the American flag. The United States claimed the act was a violation of its neutral rights.
- The small steamer Bosnia became the first British freighter lost in the war when it was sunk by U-47.
- Born: George Lazenby, actor and model, in Goulburn, New South Wales, Australia; Clay Regazzoni, racing car driver, in Mendrisio, Switzerland (d. 2006)

== September 6, 1939 (Wednesday) ==
- The Battles of Borowa Góra and Różan ended in German victories.
- The German Army occupied Kraków.
- The Battle of Piotrków Trybunalski ended in a Polish defensive victory.
- A friendly fire incident on England's east coast known as the Battle of Barking Creek claimed the first life of an RAF fighter pilot in the war.
- South Africa declared war on Germany.
- Born: Brigid Berlin, artist, in New York City (d. 2020); Susumu Tonegawa, geneticist and Nobel laureate, in Nagoya, Japan
- Died: Arthur Rackham, 71, English book illustrator

== September 7, 1939 (Thursday) ==
- The Battle of Westerplatte ended with the surrender of the Polish garrison.
- The Battle of Łomża began.
- Marshal Edward Rydz-Śmigły moved the Polish Army headquarters from Warsaw to Brest-Litovsk.
- Saar Offensive: The French Army began a ground operation in the Saarland against light German defenses.
- The Battle of Wizna began.

== September 8, 1939 (Friday) ==
- German troops reached the suburbs of Warsaw and tried to enter the city but were beaten back. The Siege of Warsaw began.
- The Battle of Gdynia began.
- The Polish Army conducted a successful delaying action in the Battle of Wola Cyrusowa.
- Ciepielów massacre: German soldiers massacred some 300 Polish prisoners of war near the village of Ciepielów (see German atrocities committed against Polish prisoners of war).
- President Roosevelt declared a limited national emergency. Increases were ordered in the enlisted strength of the army, navy and National Guard. Also, a $500,000 fund was allocated to assist in the return of American citizens stranded in war zones.

== September 9, 1939 (Saturday) ==
- The German Army occupied Łódź.
- The Battles of the Bzura and Hel began.
- Canadian Parliament approved the William Lyon Mackenzie King government's decision to declare war on Germany.
- Hitler issued Directive No. 3, Transfer of Forces from Poland to the West.
- The Glenn Miller and Ray Eberle version of "Over the Rainbow" topped the American pop charts as compiled by Your Hit Parade.
- Patricia Donnelly of Michigan was crowned Miss America 1939.
- Born:
  - Ron McDole, American football player, in Chester, Ohio
  - Reuven Rivlin, Israeli politician, 10th President of Israel
  - Harris Rosen, American businessman, investor and philanthropist (d. 2024)

== September 10, 1939 (Sunday) ==
- A special morning edition of the Canada Gazette published the Canadian declaration of war on Germany. Signed by Prime Minister Mackenzie King and bearing the seal of Governor General Lord Tweedsmuir (John Buchan), it did "hereby declare and proclaim that a state of war with the German Reich exists and has existed in our Dominion of Canada as and from the tenth day of September, 1939." This was the first and only independent declaration of war by Canada.
- The Battles of Jarosław and Kępa Oksywska began.
- The four-day Battle of Łomża ended when the Polish Army withdrew.
- Off the coast of Norway, the British submarine HMS Oxley was mistaken for an enemy by HMS Triton and sunk. There were only two survivors.
- Born: Cynthia Lennon, first wife of John Lennon, in Blackpool, England (d. 2015)
- Died: Wilhelm Fritz von Roettig, 51, first German general to die in World War II (ambushed by Polish troops near Opoczno)

== September 11, 1939 (Monday) ==
- The Battles of Kałuszyn and Przemyśl began.
- The Battle of Jarosław ended with a successful Polish delaying action.
- Saudi Arabia broke off diplomatic relations with Germany.

== September 12, 1939 (Tuesday) ==
- The Battle of Lwów began.
- The Battle of Kałuszyn ended in German victory.
- Nazi Germany issued two decrees virtually prohibiting private automobile use after September 20. Special permits would be required to buy gasoline after that date, and every privately owned rubber tire in the country was declared property of the state.
- The Duke and Duchess of Windsor returned to England from self-imposed exile in France.
- The Anglo-French Supreme War Council met for the first time, in Abbeville, France.
- Canada introduced its first war budget. Minister of National Revenue James Lorimer Ilsley announced a new 20% surtax on personal income to pay for the war as well as tax increases on alcohol, tea, coffee and cigarettes. A deficit of $156 million was forecast for the fiscal year.

== September 13, 1939 (Wednesday) ==
- The Battle of Modlin began.
- Cecylówka massacre: German troops massacred an estimated 54 to 68 civilians in Cecylówka during the invasion of Poland.
- Daladier formed his war cabinet.
- The British steam trawler Davara was sunk by the German submarine U-27 off the coast of Ireland.
- Early Wynn made his major league debut for the Washington Senators, pitching a 4-2 complete game loss against the Chicago White Sox.
- A worldwide luxury sports car brand, Ferrari was founded by Enzo Ferrari in Italy.
- Born: Richard Kiel, actor, in Detroit, Michigan (d. 2014); Guntis Ulmanis, 5th President of Latvia, in Riga

== September 14, 1939 (Thursday) ==
- The Battles of Brześć Litewski, Jaworów and Kobryń began.
- The Battle of Gdynia ended with the German capture of the city.
- The Battle of Przemyśl ended with the Polish surrender of the city.
- The German submarine U-39 attacked the British aircraft carrier HMS Ark Royal off Rockall Bank, but the torpedoes fell short of their target. Three British destroyers in the vicinity hunted down U-39 and disabled it with depth charges, rescuing all the crew. It was the first U-boat to be sunk in World War II.

== September 15, 1939 (Friday) ==
- Orzeł incident: The Polish submarine Orzeł, at sea when hostilities broke out and unable to return to a Polish base, entered port in Tallinn. Estonian authorities, at the insistence of the German embassy, interned the submarine to prevent it from putting out to sea again.
- Charles Lindbergh made a nationwide radio broadcast in favor of American isolationism. "It is madness to send our soldiers to be killed as we did in the last war if we turn the course of peace over to the greed, the fear and the intrigue of European nations. We must either keep out of European wars entirely or stay in European affairs permanently", Lindbergh said. "We must not permit our sentiment, our pity, or our personal feelings of sympathy, to obscure the issue, to affect our children's lives ... America has little to gain by taking part in another European war."
- Born: Ron Walker, businessman, in Melbourne, Australia (d. 2018)

== September 16, 1939 (Saturday) ==
- The Battles of Khalkhin Gol ended with an armistice.
- The Battle of Jaworów ended in Polish victory.
- The Saar Offensive ended with an unforced French withdrawal after operations failed to divert any German troops from Poland.
- The British steam trawler Rudyard Kipling was sunk off the west coast of Ireland by the German submarine U-27.
- The New York Yankees clinched their fourth consecutive American League pennant with an 8–5 win over the Detroit Tigers.
- Born: Breyten Breytenbach, writer and painter, in Bonnievale, Western Cape, South Africa (d. 2024)
- Died: Józef Kustroń, 46, Polish general (killed in action)

== September 17, 1939 (Sunday) ==
- The Soviet Union invaded Poland from the east.
- Poland's leadership fled to Romania.
- The Battle of Brześć Litewski ended in German victory.
- The Battle of Changsha began in the Second Sino-Japanese War.
- The British aircraft carrier HMS Courageous was sunk off the coast of Ireland by German submarine U-29.
- Taisto Mäki becomes the first human to run 10,000m in under 30 minutes

== September 18, 1939 (Monday) ==
- The Battles of Tomaszów Lubelski and Wilno began.
- The Battle of Kobryń ended inconclusively.
- The city of Lublin fell to the Germans.
- The Polish submarine Orzeł escaped from internment at Tallinn and began a perilous 27-day voyage to Scotland. The crew's navigational charts had been confiscated by Estonian military authorities but someone from the British embassy might have secretly provided them with new charts. The Soviets angrily accused Estonia of helping the Orzeł to escape and threatened to enter Estonian territorial waters to search for the submarine.
- William Joyce began making English-language propaganda broadcasts over German radio to England. He would earn the nickname Lord Haw-Haw.
- Born: Jorge Sampaio, 18th President of Portugal, in Lisbon (d. 2021)
- Died: Stanisław Ignacy Witkiewicz, 54, Polish writer, painter and philosopher (suicide)

== September 19, 1939 (Tuesday) ==
- The Battle of Wilno ended with the Soviet capture of the city.
- The Battles of the Bzura and Kępa Oksywska ended in German victories.
- The Red Army joined the Battle of Lwów.
- The Battle of Wólka Węglowa was fought, resulting in Polish tactical victory.
- Hitler entered the former Free City of Danzig and gave a speech denouncing the Polish government and warning England that Germany would never capitulate even if the war lasted years.

== September 20, 1939 (Wednesday) ==
- Army Kraków surrendered in the Battle of Tomaszów Lubelski.
- The German submarine U-27 was sunk by British destroyers west of Scotland.
- Joe Louis retained the world heavyweight boxing title with an 11th-round knockout of Bob Pastor at Briggs Stadium in Detroit.

== September 21, 1939 (Thursday) ==
- The Battles of Cześniki and Grodno began.
- Reinhard Heydrich met with police and security officials in Berlin. Heydrich ordered that Germany's Jews and Romani be transferred to Poland using freight cars.
- President Roosevelt made a speech to Congress saying the United States should amend its Neutrality Acts to allow countries fighting Germany to purchase American arms. The president said the current laws stood to give passive "aid to an aggressor," while denying help to victimized nations.
- A full broadcast day of radio station WJSV in Washington, D.C. is recorded for preservation in the National Archives.
- Died: Armand Călinescu, 46, Prime Minister of Romania (assassinated by Iron Guard members)

== September 22, 1939 (Friday) ==
- The Battle of Lwów ended when the Polish commander handed the city over to the Soviets.
- The Battle of Cześniki ended indecisively.
- Boryszew massacre: German soldiers massacred 50 Polish prisoners of war in Boryszew.
- The German–Soviet military parade in Brest-Litovsk was held.
- The Anglo-French Supreme War Council met again in Hove.
- Born: Marlena Shaw, singer, in New Rochelle, New York (d. 2024)
- Died: Werner von Fritsch, 59, German general (killed in action during the Siege of Warsaw)

== September 23, 1939 (Saturday) ==
- The Battle of Krasnobród was fought, resulting in Polish victory.
- The Panama Conference began with 21 countries of the Americas in attendance.
- Radios owned by Jews in Nazi Germany were confiscated.
- Cookie Lavagetto of the Brooklyn Dodgers went 6-for-6 with a walk during a 22–4 win over the Philadelphia Phillies.
- German submarine U-54 was commissioned.
- Born: Janusz Gajos, actor, in Dąbrowa Górnicza, Poland
- Died: Sigmund Freud, 83, Austrian neurologist and psychoanalysist (euthanasia); Floyd Gibbons, 52, American war correspondent (heart attack)

== September 24, 1939 (Sunday) ==
- The Luftwaffe bombed Warsaw for the first time, reducing entire streets to rubble and causing widespread fires. The British government considered the bombing a breach of the pledge Germany made at the start of the war to refrain from indiscriminate attacks.
- In the Battle of Husynne, the Polish Army beat back a Soviet infantry corps but were surrounded and forced to surrender by a counterattack of Soviet tanks.
- The Battle of Grodno ended in Soviet victory.
- Born: Moti Kirschenbaum, media personality and documentarian, in Kfar Saba, Mandatory Palestine (d. 2015)
- Died: Carl Laemmle, 72, German-born American filmmaker

== September 25, 1939 (Monday) ==
- A tropical storm made landfall near San Pedro, California, the only tropical storm to do so in the twentieth century.
- Hitler issued Directive No. 4, Finishing the War in Poland.
- The British began laying anti-submarine mines in the Strait of Dover.

== September 26, 1939 (Tuesday) ==
- The Battle of Tomaszów Lubelski ended with the capitulation of most of the Polish forces in the region.
- Werner von Fritsch was given a funeral with full military honors in Berlin. Hermann Göring and Walther von Brauchitsch were among those present but Hitler was not, sending a large wreath instead.
- A Luftwaffe aircraft was shot down by the British for the first time. A Dornier Do 18 flying boat was downed by a Blackburn Skua of 803 Naval Air Squadron north of the Fisher Bank.
- The French Communist Party and all of its affiliates were banned. The French government took the action in response to the Soviet Union's invasion of Poland and pact with Germany.
- Born: Ricky Tomlinson, actor and activist, in Bispham, Blackpool, England

== September 27, 1939 (Wednesday) ==
- The Battle of Władypol was fought, resulting in Soviet victory.
- The first Polish resistance movement, the Service for Poland's Victory, was created.
- Chancellor of the Exchequer Sir John Simon introduced an emergency war budget raising income taxes, inheritance taxes, profits taxes and duties on alcohol, sugar and tobacco. Even with the new tax revenue Britain still faced a deficit of £938 million.
- The Reich Security Main Office was created under the command of Heinrich Himmler.

== September 28, 1939 (Thursday) ==
- The Siege of Warsaw ended after twenty days when the Polish garrison capitulated to the Germans.
- The Battle of Szack was fought, resulting in a tactical Polish victory over the Soviets.
- Germany and the Soviet Union signed the German-Soviet Frontier Treaty, amending a secret clause in the Molotov–Ribbentrop Pact.
- The Soviet–Estonian Mutual Assistance Treaty was signed in Moscow.
- The Cincinnati Reds clinched the National League pennant with a 5–3 win over the St. Louis Cardinals.
- Born: Rudolph Walker, actor, in Trinidad, West Indies
- Died: Martha Root, 67, American Bahá'í teacher

== September 29, 1939 (Friday) ==
- The Battle of Modlin ended when Modlin Fortress capitulated to the Germans.
- The Battles of Parczew, Jabłoń and Milanów between the Polish Army and the Red Army began.
- Estonia signed an agreement with the Soviet Union allowing the Soviets to establish naval and air bases within Estonia's borders.
- Born: Larry Linville, actor, in Ojai, California (d. 2000)

== September 30, 1939 (Saturday) ==
- The Battles of Parczew, Jabłoń and Milanów ended in a tactical Polish victory.
- The Polish government-in-exile was established in Paris. Władysław Raczkiewicz and Władysław Sikorski became president and prime minister, respectively.
- Hitler issued Directive No. 5, Partition of Poland.
- Melbourne defeated Collingwood in the VFL Grand Final.
- The Waynesburg vs. Fordham football game was broadcast on NBC, the first American football game ever televised.
- Born: Jean-Marie Lehn, chemist and Nobel laureate, in Rosheim, France
