= HM LST-404 =

Tank landing ship

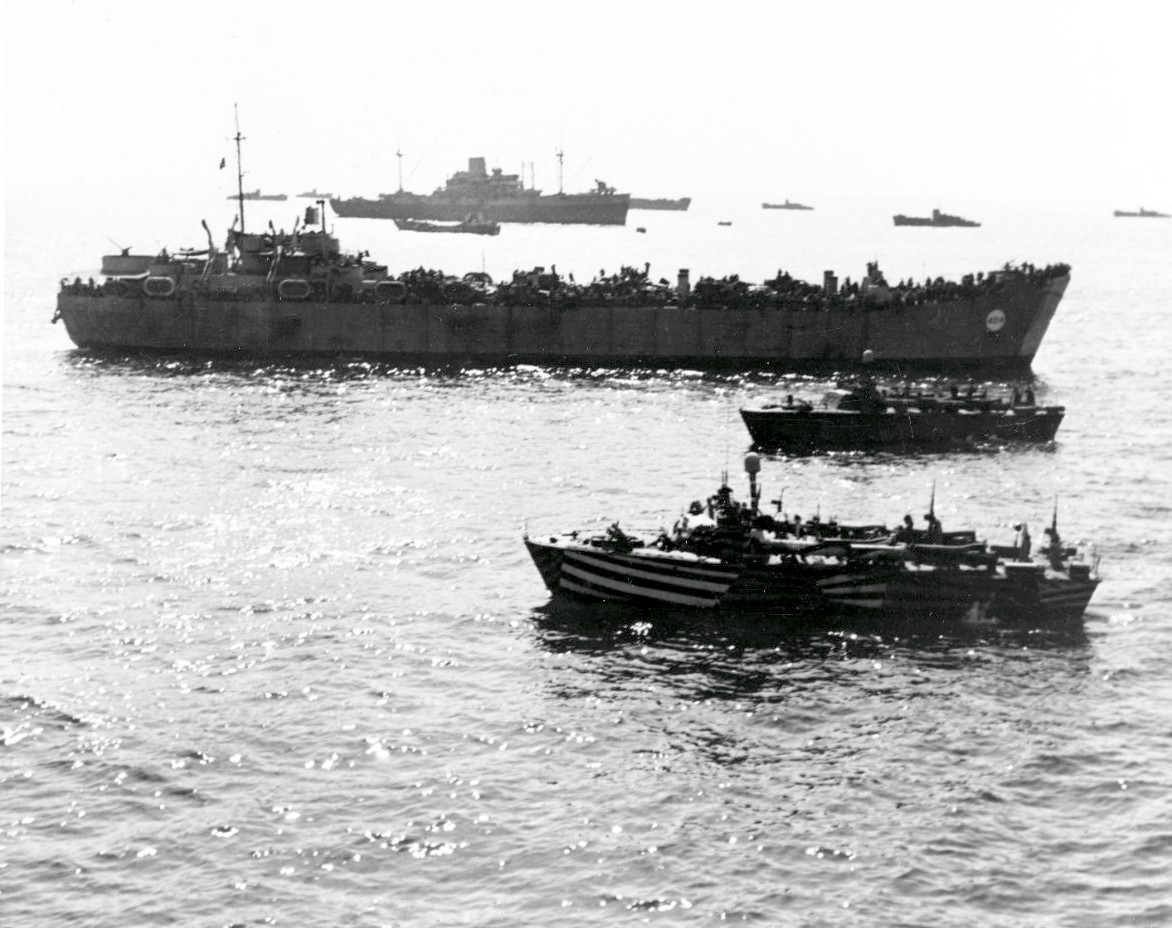
- HM LST-404 off the invasion beaches at Salerno, 12 September 1943, LST-404 and two unidentified PT boats are seen with Ancon in the background.

History

United Kingdom
- Name: LST-404
- Ordered: as a Type S3-M-K2 hull, MCE hull 924
- Builder: Bethlehem-Fairfield Shipyard, Baltimore, Maryland
- Yard number: 2176
- Laid down: 27 August 1942
- Launched: 28 October 1942
- Commissioned: 16 December 1942
- Identification: Hull symbol: LST-404
- Fate: Returned to USN custody, 14 October 1944

United States
- Name: LST-404
- Acquired: 14 October 1944
- Stricken: 21 October 1945
- Fate: Sold for scrapping, November 1946

General characteristics
- Class & type: LST-1-class tank landing ship
- Displacement: 4,080 long tons (4,145 t) full load; 2,160 long tons (2,190 t) landing
- Length: 328 ft (100 m) oa
- Beam: 50 ft (15 m)
- Draft: Full load: 8 ft 2 in (2.49 m) forward; 14 ft 1 in (4.29 m) aft; Landing at 2,160 t: 3 ft 11 in (1.19 m) forward; 9 ft 10 in (3.00 m) aft
- Installed power: 2 × 900 hp (670 kW) Electro-Motive Diesel 12-567A diesel engines; 1,700 shp (1,300 kW)
- Propulsion: 1 × Falk main reduction gears; 2 × Propellers
- Speed: 12 kn (22 km/h; 14 mph)
- Range: 24,000 nmi (44,000 km; 28,000 mi) at 9 kn (17 km/h; 10 mph) while displacing 3,960 long tons (4,024 t)
- Boats & landing craft carried: 2 or 6 x LCVPs
- Capacity: 2,100 tons oceangoing maximum; 350 tons main deckload
- Troops: 163
- Complement: 117
- Armament: Varied, ultimate armament; 1 × QF 12-pounder 12 cwt naval gun; 6 × 20 mm (0.79 in) Oerlikon cannon; 4 × Fast Aerial Mine (FAM) mounts

HM LST-404 was a United States Navy LST-1-class tank landing ship that was transferred to the Royal Navy during World War II. As with many of her class, the ship was never named. Instead, she was referred to by her hull designation.

== Construction ==
LST-404 was laid down on 27 August 1942, under Maritime Commission (MARCOM) contract, MC hull 924, by the Bethlehem-Fairfield Shipyard, Baltimore, Maryland; launched 28 October 1942; then transferred to the United Kingdom and commissioned on 16 December 1942.

== Service history ==
LST-404 was used to transport elements of the 179th Regimental Combat Team to "Beach Blue" during the Salerno landings in Italy, 10 September 1943.

On the afternoon of 15 August 1944, LST-404 was returning to England from the Normandy beachhead, as part of convoy FTM 69, with wounded personnel, casualties, and prisoners of war, when she was torpedoed by U-741 about 35 miles (56 km) southeast of St. Catherine's Point. (50°02′N 0°38′W) LST-413 was able to get alongside LST-404 and take off the passengers and crew, however, eight crewmen and several POWs were killed in the torpedo explosion. ATR-4 took LST-404 in tow and took her to St. Helen's Roads, Isle of Wight, and then on to Lee-on-Solent, on 16 August.

LST-404 saw no active service in the United States Navy. The tank landing ship was struck from the Navy list on 14 October 1944. She was decommissioned, returned to United States Navy custody on 21 October 1945, sold through the auspices of the State Department in November 1946, and was broken up in June 1948, at Zeebrugge.

== See also ==
- List of United States Navy LSTs

== Notes ==
Citations

== Bibliography ==
Online resources

- "LST-404". Dictionary of American Naval Fighting Ships. Naval History and Heritage Command. This article incorporates text from this source, which is in the public domain.
- "Bethlehem-Fairfield, Baltimore MD". www.ShipbuildingHistory.com. 14 August 2008.
- "USS LST-404". NavSource. 16 September 2016.
- Helgason, Guðmundur. "HMS LST-404". German U-boats of WWII - uboat.net.
