= HMS Foxhound (H69) =

British F-class destroyer

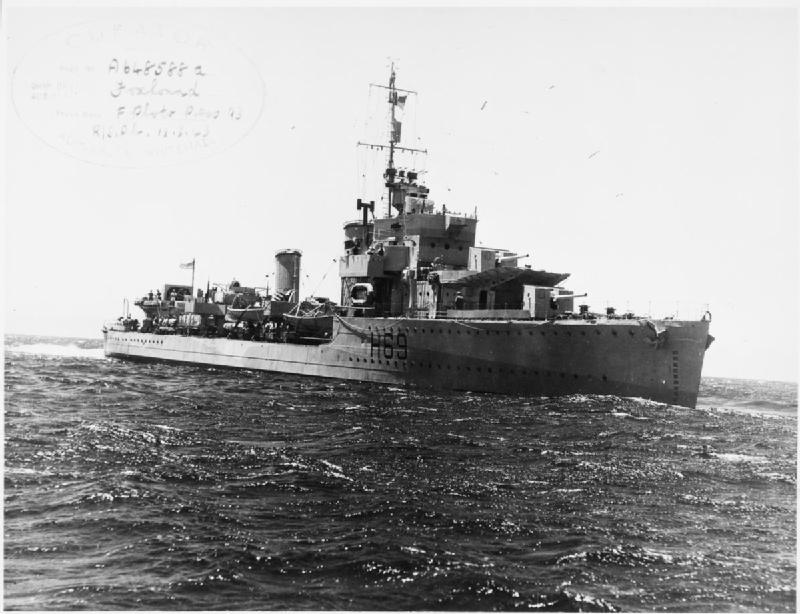
- Foxhound at sea, December 1942

History

United Kingdom
- Name: Foxhound
- Laid down: 21 August 1933
- Launched: 12 October 1934
- Commissioned: 6 June 1935
- Decommissioned: 8 February 1944
- Identification: Pennant number: H69
- Fate: Transferred to the Royal Canadian Navy, 8 February 1944

Canada
- Name: Qu'Appelle
- Namesake: Qu'Appelle River
- Acquired: 8 February 1944
- Commissioned: 8 February 1944
- Decommissioned: 26 May 1946
- Honours and awards: Atlantic 1944, Normandy 1944, Biscay 1944
- Fate: Sold for scrap, December 1947

General characteristics (as built)
- Class & type: E and F-class destroyer; Canadian River-class destroyer
- Displacement: 1,405 long tons (1,428 t) (standard)
- Length: 329 ft (100.3 m) o/a
- Beam: 33 ft 3 in (10.13 m)
- Draught: 12 ft 6 in (3.81 m) (deep)
- Installed power: 3 × Admiralty 3-drum boilers; 36,000 shaft horsepower (27,000 kW)
- Propulsion: 2 × shafts; 2 × geared steam turbines
- Speed: 35.5 knots (65.7 km/h; 40.9 mph)
- Range: 6,350 nmi (11,760 km; 7,310 mi) at 15 knots (28 km/h; 17 mph)
- Complement: 145
- Sensors & processing systems: ASDIC
- Armament: 4 × single 4.7 in (120 mm) guns; 2 × quadruple 0.5 in (12.7 mm) machine guns; 2 × quadruple 21 in (533 mm) torpedo tubes; 20 × depth charges, 1 rack and 2 throwers

HMS Foxhound was one of nine F-class destroyers built for the Royal Navy in the mid-1930s. Although she was assigned to the Home Fleet, the ship was detached as part of the Mediterranean Fleet to enforce the arms blockade imposed by Britain and France on both sides during the Spanish Civil War of 1936–39. Several weeks after the start of the Second World War in September 1939, Foxhound helped to sink a German submarine and participated in the Second Battle of Narvik during the Norwegian Campaign of April–June 1940. The ship was sent to Gibraltar in mid-1940 and formed part of Force H where she participated in the attack on Mers-el-Kébir. Foxhound escorted the aircraft carriers of Force H as they flew off aircraft for Malta and covered convoys resupplying and reinforcing the island until late 1941. During this time the ship helped to sink another German submarine.

In December, she was briefly transferred to the Mediterranean Fleet where she escorted several convoys to Malta from the Eastern Mediterranean. Foxhound was transferred to the Eastern Fleet in early 1942 and was then assigned to convoy escort duties off South Africa and then in West Africa until mid-1943 when she was converted into an escort destroyer. When the conversion was completed in early 1944, the ship was transferred to the Royal Canadian Navy and renamed HMCS Qu'Appelle. She was assigned escort duties in the Western Approaches for several months before the ship was transferred to the English Channel to protect convoys during the Normandy landings. Qu'Appelle engaged German surface ships several times before she was sent to Iceland for more convoy escort work in October. The ship received a lengthy refit in Canada at the end of the year that was not completed until mid-1945. Qu'Appelle then ferried Canadian troops back to Canada for several months before she became a training ship. She was placed in reserve in mid-1946 and was sold for scrap at the end of 1947.

== Description ==
The F-class ships were repeats of the preceding E-class. They displaced 1,405 long tons (1,428 t) at standard load and 1,940 long tons (1,970 t) at deep load. The ships had an overall length of 329 feet (100.3 m), a beam of 33 feet 3 inches (10.1 m) and a draught of 12 feet 6 inches (3.8 m). They were powered by two Brown-Curtis geared steam turbines, each driving one propeller shaft, using steam provided by three Admiralty three-drum boilers. The turbines developed a total of 36,000 shaft horsepower (27,000 kW) and gave a maximum speed of 35.5 knots (65.7 km/h; 40.9 mph). Foxhound barely exceeded her designed speed during her sea trials. She carried a maximum of 470 long tons (480 t) of fuel oil that gave her a range of 6,350 nautical miles (11,760 km; 7,310 mi) at 15 knots (28 km/h; 17 mph). The ships' complement was 145 officers and ratings.

The ships mounted four 4.7-inch (120 mm) Mark IX guns in single mounts, designated 'A', 'B', 'X', and 'Y' in sequence from front to rear. For anti-aircraft (AA) defence, they had two quadruple mounts for the 0.5 inch Vickers Mark III machine gun. The F class was fitted with two above-water quadruple torpedo tube mounts for 21-inch (533 mm) torpedoes. One depth charge rack and two throwers were fitted; 20 depth charges were originally carried, but this increased to 35 shortly after the Second World War began.

=== Wartime modifications ===
By October 1940, Foxhound had her rear torpedo tube mount replaced by a 12-pounder AA gun. While the ship was under repair in late 1941, her existing director-control tower and rangefinder above the bridge was replaced by a new director with a Type 285 gunnery radar mounted on its roof. These fed target data to the new Fuze-Keeping Clock, an analogue fire-control system that calculated the gunnery information for the guns. The ship also received a HF/DF radio direction finder at the top of her foremast. Her short-range AA armament was augmented by two 20 mm (0.8 in) Oerlikon guns on the wings of the ship's bridge, a pair on the enlarged searchlight platform and, probably, another pair were added on the quarterdeck.

When she was converted into an escort destroyer in late 1943, 'B' gun was replaced by a Hedgehog anti-submarine spigot mortar and stowage was increased for a total of 70 depth charges which meant that 'Y' gun and the 12-pounder AA gun had to be removed to compensate for the weight. A Type 271 target-indication radar replaced the director. It is likely that the Vickers guns were replaced by the Oerlikons from the quarterdeck at this time.

== Construction and career ==
Foxhound, the seventh ship of that name in the Royal Navy, was laid down by John Brown & Company at their Clydebank shipyard on 15 August 1933. She was launched on 12 October 1934 and completed on 21 June 1935. The ship cost 247,234 pounds, excluding government-furnished equipment like the armament. Foxhound was initially assigned to the 6th Destroyer Flotilla (DF) of the Home Fleet, but often detached to the Mediterranean Fleet to enforce the arms embargo imposed on both sides in the Spanish Civil War by the Non-Intervention Committee. Between November 1936 and 13 February 1937, the ship was based in Gibraltar except for a brief refit at Sheerness Dockyard in January. She patrolled the Spanish ports on the Bay of Biscay in May–June and August–October before returning home for a refit at Chatham Dockyard from 27 October to 30 December. During her service in northern Spanish waters, Foxhound was accidentally engaged and straddled by the Spanish nationalist minelayer Jupiter while on station off Gijon in August. She then returned to the Mediterranean to patrol the area between Gibraltar and Oran, French Algeria from January to March 1938. On 22 September, the ship collided with the submarine Seahorse, damaging one of her propellers. She was repaired at Sheerness from 10 November to 12 December. Foxhound remained in home waters for the rest of 1938–39. The 6th DF was renumbered the 8th Destroyer Flotilla in April 1939, five months before the start of World War II.

In September 1939, Foxhound was assigned to the Home Fleet and based at Scapa Flow. In the first month of hostilities she was part of an anti-submarine hunting group centred on the aircraft carrier Ark Royal. On 14 September, the carrier was unsuccessfully attacked by the German submarine U-39. Foxhound, in company with her sisters Faulknor and Firedrake, counter-attacked and sank U-39 north-west of Ireland. In February 1940, she was one of the escorts for Convoy TC 3 carrying troops from Canada to the UK. Later that month the ship rescued the survivors of the torpedoed freighter SS Orania on 11 February.

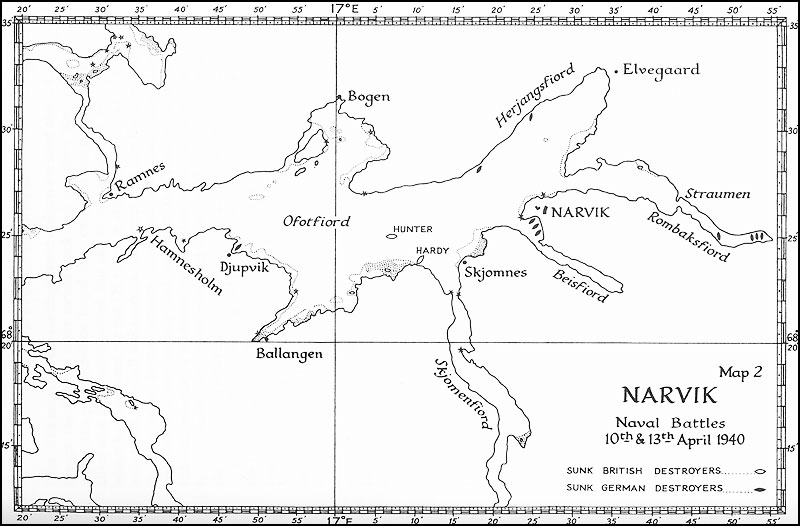
A map of the Ofotfjord

During the Second Battle of Narvik, Foxhound and the destroyers Icarus and Hero streamed their TSDS minesweeping gear in advance of the battleship Warspite and her escort as they steamed up the Vestfjord to engage the remaining German destroyers on 13 April. The ship and four other British destroyers pursued the remaining German ships into the Rombaksfjorden (the easternmost branch of the Ofotfjord), east of Narvik, where the lack of ammunition had forced the German ships to retreat. During the battle, Foxhound rescued two officers and nine ratings from the destroyer Z12 Erich Giese. During May, she escorted troop convoys to Iceland as they occupied the island. In early June, the ship was escorting the battlecruiser Repulse and two cruisers as they searched for illusory German commerce raiders off Iceland; they were recalled to Norwegian waters on 9 June after the Germans launched Operation Juno, an attack on the Allied convoys evacuating Norway, but the Germans had already returned to base by the time the ships arrived. Later, Foxhound escorted Ark Royal and the battlecruiser Hood, together with her sisters Faulknor and Fearless and the destroyer Escapade, from Scapa Flow to Gibraltar where they would form Force H.

=== Force H, 1940–1941 ===
On the morning of 3 July, she ferried Captain Cedric Holland, the emissary of Admiral James Somerville, commander of Force H, to meet with Admiral Marcel-Bruno Gensoul, commander of the Vichy French forces at Mers-el-Kébir, Algeria. Holland was to deliver an ultimatum regarding the disposition of the French ships there to ensure that they could not fall into the hands of the Germans. Gensoul initially refused to meet with such a low-ranking envoy, but later relented and negotiations were underway that afternoon to disarm the French ships in place when the British Prime Minister, Winston Churchill, ordered the talks terminated to forestall the impending arrival of French reinforcements. The British opened fire a half-hour later, including Foxhound. A month later the ship escorted Force H during Operation Hurry, a mission to fly off fighter aircraft for Malta and conduct an airstrike on Cagliari on 2 August. Shortly afterwards, she escorted Hood back home and began a refit at Sheerness that lasted until October.

Foxhound then returned to Gibraltar and escorted the aircraft carriers Argus and Ark Royal during Operations Coat and White in November. In between sorties into the Mediterranean, the ship escorted convoys between Gibraltar and West Africa. In early January 1941, she was involved in Operation Excess. On 31 January, Force H, including Foxhound, departed Gibraltar to carry out Operation Picket, an unsuccessful night torpedo attack by eight of Ark Royal's Fairey Swordfish on the Tirso Dam in Sardinia. The British ships returned to Gibraltar on 4 February and began preparing for Operation Grog, a naval bombardment of Genoa, that was successfully carried out five days later. On 7 April, Foxhound was escorting Convoy WS 7 off the coast of Sierra Leone, West Africa, when she rescued three seamen. They were survivors from the cargo liner Umona, which had been sunk a week earlier. In mid-May, she participated in Operation Splice, another mission in which the carriers Ark Royal and Furious flew off fighters for Malta.

Force H was ordered to join the escort of Convoy WS 8B in the North Atlantic on 24 May, a day after the Battle of the Denmark Strait, but they were directed to search for the German battleship Bismarck and the heavy cruiser Prinz Eugen on the 25th. Heavy seas increased fuel consumption for all of the escorts and Foxhound was forced to return to Gibraltar to refuel later that day before rejoining the capital ships of Force H on the 29th, after Bismarck had been tracked down and sunk. The destroyer screened another flying-off mission to Malta on 14 June; two days later, after German blockade runners reached France, Force H sortied into the Atlantic on a failed search for more blockade runners. Together with her sisters Faulknor, Fearless, Forester and Foresight, Foxhound helped to sink the German submarine U-138 on 18 June. Four days later, the 8th DF was tasked to intercept a German supply ship spotted heading towards the French coast. The next day they intercepted MV Alstertor which was scuttled by her crew upon the approach of the British ships. They rescued 78 British POWs taken from ships sunk by German raiders and the crew. In late June, Foxhound screened Ark Royal and Furious as they flew off more fighters for Malta in Operation Railway.

During Operation Substance, Firedrake and Foxhound were each leading a column of the convoy, streaming their TSDS minesweeps, through the Sicilian Narrows on 23 July when an Italian bomb near missed Firedrake and disabled her so that she had to be towed back to Gibraltar. The bulk of the convoy reached Malta the next day before the escorts rejoined Force H. A week later she screened the capital ships of Force H as they covered another Malta convoy (Operation Style). Foxhound returned to the UK in August for a refit that lasted until November. The ship was briefly assigned to Escort Group EG.3 in the North Atlantic for convoy escort duties later that month until she was transferred to the Mediterranean Fleet in late December.

=== 1942–1946 ===
Foxhound screened the light cruisers of Force B and the freighter Glengyle of Convoy MF 2 from Alexandria, Egypt, to Malta in early January 1942. A week later, she escorted the cruisers covering Convoy MF 3 to Malta and was detached to escort the freighter MV Thermopylae to Benghazi, Libya, after she developed engine trouble on 18 January. En route the freighter was sunk by German aircraft and Foxhound arrived back at Alexandria on 20 January. By 29 March, the ship had been transferred to the Eastern Fleet and was assigned to the fast ships of Force A as Somerville organised his forces in anticipation of the Japanese invasion of the Indian Ocean. Shortly afterwards she was transferred to South Africa and the 2nd Destroyer Flotilla to escort convoys. Foxhound was then transferred to 4th Destroyer Flotilla at Freetown, Sierra Leone, in May–July 1943.

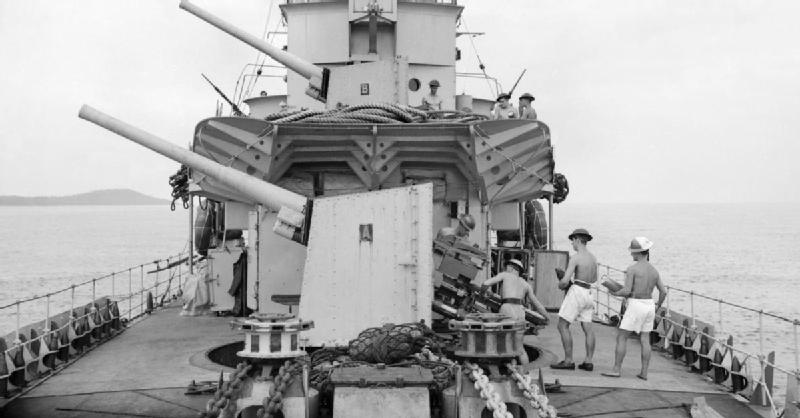
The ship's forward 4.7-inch guns, Freetown, 1943

Foxhound was converted to an escort destroyer from August 1943 and she was transferred to Canada on completion on 8 February 1944. The ship was commissioned into the Royal Canadian Navy that same day as HMCS Qu'Appelle. After working up at the Anti-Submarine Training School at Tobermory on the Isle of Mull, she was assigned to the Western Approaches Command. Initially Qu'Appelle was a part of the 6th Escort Group based at Londonderry Port, but she was transferred to the 12th Escort Group in May where she later patrolled the western entrance to the English Channel after the Normandy landings to protect shipping from German attacks.

Together with the destroyers Saskatchewan, Skeena, and Restigouche, Qu'Appelle attacked three German patrol boats off Brest on the night of 5–6 July, with the German patrol boat V715 being sunk and Qu'Appelle lightly damaged. On 11 August, the ship, Restigouche, Skeena and the destroyer Assiniboine intercepted a small convoy south of Brest. While they sank two naval trawlers, Qu'Appelle was accidentally rammed by Skeena during the engagement and was under repair until 5 September. The following month she joined the 11th Escort Group for patrols off Iceland until the end of November. The ship arrived at Halifax on 29 November to begin a refit at Pictou, Nova Scotia, that lasted from 5 December to 30 June 1945.

Qu'Appelle made four trips to the UK to ferry Canadian troops back to Canada by 25 September. The ship then became a stationary training ship for the Torpedo School at Halifax. She was placed in reserve on 27 May 1946 and then sold to German and Milne for scrap in December 1947. (Note: Macpherson and Barrie differ significantly from English in their account of the late history of the ship. They say that the refit ended on 31 March 1945 and Qu'Appelle made her trooping voyages between August and October. By their account she became a training ship on 11 October and was removed from service in January 1946.)

== Sources ==
- Admiralty Historical Section: The Royal Navy and the Mediterranean. Whitehall Histories, Naval Staff Histories. Vol. II November 1940 – December 1941. London: Whitehall History in association with Frank Cass. 2002. ISBN 0-7146-5205-9.
- Colledge, J. J.; Warlow, Ben (2006) [1969]. Ships of the Royal Navy: The Complete Record of All Fighting Ships of the Royal Navy from the 15th Century to the Present (3rd Rev ed.). London: Chatham Publishing. ISBN 978-1-86176-281-8. OCLC 67375475.
- English, John (1993). Amazon to Ivanhoe: British Standard Destroyers of the 1930s. Kendal, England: World Ship Society. ISBN 0-905617-64-9.
- Foreign Office: Index to the correspondence of the Foreign Office for the year 1937, Part 4. Kraus–Thomson, 1937
- Friedman, Norman (2009). British Destroyers From Earliest Days to the Second World War. Annapolis, Maryland: Naval Institute Press. ISBN 978-1-59114-081-8.
- Haarr, Geirr H. (2010). The Battle for Norway: April–June 1940. Barnsley: Seaforth Publishing. ISBN 978-1-84832-057-4.
- Haarr, Geirr H. (2009). The German Invasion of Norway, April 1940. Annapolis, Maryland: Naval Institute Press. ISBN 978-1-59114-323-9.
- Lasterle, Philippe (July 2003). "Could Admiral Gensoul Have Averted the Tragedy of Mers el-Kebir?" (PDF). Journal of Military History. 67 (3): 835–44. doi:10.1353/jmh.2003.0234. S2CID 159759345 – via Project MUSE.
- Lenton, H. T. (1998). British & Empire Warships of the Second World War. Annapolis, Maryland: Naval Institute Press. ISBN 1-55750-048-7.
- MacPherson, Ken & Barrie, Ron (2002). The Ships of Canada's Naval Forces 1910–2002. St. Catharines, Ontario: Vanwell. ISBN 1-55125-072-1.
- March, Edgar J. (1966). British Destroyers: A History of Development, 1892–1953; Drawn by Admiralty Permission From Official Records & Returns, Ships' Covers & Building Plans. London: Seeley Service. OCLC 164893555.
- Rohwer, Jürgen (2005). Chronology of the War at Sea 1939–1945: The Naval History of World War Two (Third Revised ed.). Annapolis, Maryland: Naval Institute Press. ISBN 1-59114-119-2.
- Smith, Peter C. (2004). Destroyer Leader: The Story of HMS Faulknor 1935–46 (3rd rev. exp. ed.). Barnsley: Pen & Sword Maritime. ISBN 1-84415-121-2.
- Whitley, M. J. (1988). Destroyers of World War Two: An International Encyclopedia. Annapolis, Maryland: Naval Institute Press. ISBN 0-87021-326-1.
