= HMS Faulknor (H62) =

Destroyer of the Royal Navy

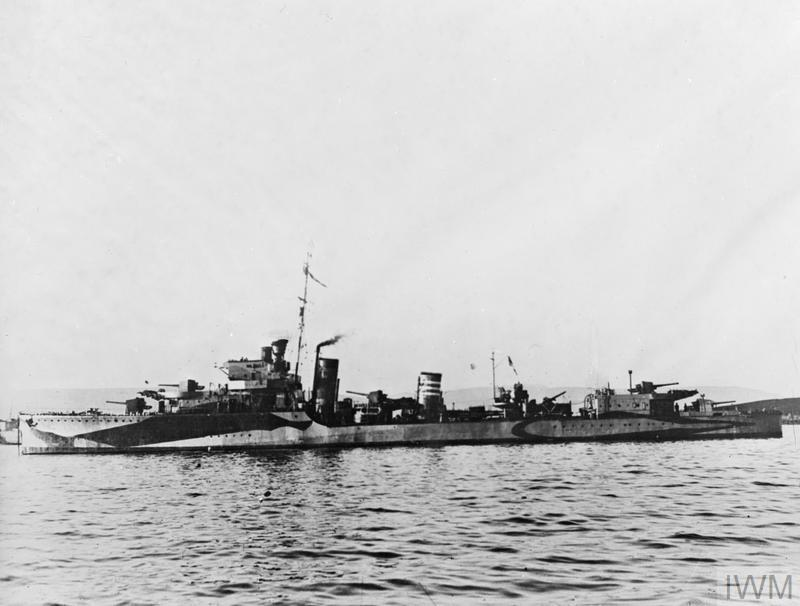
- Faulknor, January 1943

History

United Kingdom
- Name: Faulknor
- Namesake: Robert Faulknor
- Ordered: 17 March 1933
- Builder: Yarrows, Scotstoun
- Cost: £271,886
- Laid down: 31 July 1933
- Launched: 12 June 1934
- Commissioned: 24 May 1935
- Decommissioned: 25 July 1945
- Motto: Dulcit amor Patria; ("Love of fatherland leads")
- Honours and awards: Battle honours : Atlantic 1939–43; Norway 1940; Spartivento 1940; Malta Convoys 1941; Arctic 1942–43; Sicily 1943; Salerno 1943; Aegean 1943; Mediterranean 1943–44; Anzio 1944; Normandy 1944
- Fate: Sold, 21 January 1946
- Badge: On a Field White, a trident Gold, over two laurel leaves Green

General characteristics (as built)
- Class & type: F-class destroyer flotilla leader
- Displacement: 1,475 long tons (1,499 t) (standard); 2,010 long tons (2,040 t) (deep load)
- Length: 343 ft (104.5 m) o/a
- Beam: 33 ft 9 in (10.3 m)
- Draught: 12 ft 6 in (3.8 m)
- Installed power: 3 × Admiralty 3-drum boilers; 38,000 shp (28,000 kW)
- Propulsion: 2 × shafts, 2 × geared steam turbines
- Speed: 36 knots (67 km/h; 41 mph)
- Range: 6,500 nmi (12,000 km; 7,500 mi) at 15 knots (28 km/h; 17 mph)
- Complement: 175
- Sensors & processing systems: ASDIC
- Armament: 5 × single 4.7 in (120 mm) guns; 2 × quadruple 0.5 in (12.7 mm) AA machine guns; 2 × quadruple 21 in (533 mm) torpedo tubes; 20 × depth charges, 1 rail and 2 throwers

HMS Faulknor was the flotilla leader for the F-class destroyers built for the Royal Navy during the 1930s. The ship had a particularly active operational role during World War II, being awarded 11 battle honours, and was known as "The hardest worked destroyer in the Fleet". She was the first ship to sink a German U-boat, took part in the Norwegian Campaign, served with Force H in the Mediterranean on the Malta Convoys, escorted convoys to Russia and across the Atlantic, and saw action during the invasions of Sicily, Italy and Normandy, and was at the liberation of the Channel Islands. She was then decommissioned and sold for scrap in late 1945.

== Design and description ==
As the flotilla leader for the F-class destroyers, Faulknor was built to the same design as Exmouth, flotilla leader for the preceding E-class destroyers, which marked a return to building flotilla leaders to an enlarged design, the most obvious difference being the additional 4.7-inch (120 mm) gun between the funnels. Overall, she was only slightly larger than the other F-class destroyers in terms of length, beam, and draught, although she displaced an additional 90 long tons (91 t) tons, and had a complement of 175 officers and ratings, compared to the standard F-class complement of 145.

Faulknor displaced 1,475 long tons (1,499 t) at standard load and 2,010 long tons (2,040 t) at deep load. The ship had an overall length of 343 feet (104.5 m), a beam of 33 feet 9 inches (10.3 m) and a draught of 12 feet 6 inches (3.8 m). She was powered by two Parsons geared steam turbines, each driving one propeller shaft, using steam provided by three Admiralty three-drum boilers. The turbines developed a total of 38,000 shaft horsepower (28,000 kW) and gave a maximum speed of 36 knots (67 km/h; 41 mph). Faulknor reached a speed of 36.53 knots (67.65 km/h; 42.04 mph) during her sea trials. The ship carried a maximum of 490 long tons (500 t) of fuel oil that gave her a range of 6,500 nautical miles (12,000 km; 7,500 mi) at 15 knots (28 km/h; 17 mph). When inclined, she had a metacentric height of 2.89 feet (0.88 m) at deep load.

The ship mounted five 4.7-inch Mark IX guns in single mounts, one superfiring pair fore and aft of the superstructure and the fifth gun between the funnels. The mounts were designated 'A', 'B', 'Q', 'X', and 'Y' in sequence from front to rear. For anti-aircraft defence, Faulknor had two quadruple Mark I mounts on the bridge wings for the 0.5 inch (12.7 mm) Vickers Mark III machine gun. She was fitted with two above-water quintuple torpedo tube mounts for 21-inch (533 mm) torpedoes. One depth charge rack and two throwers were fitted; 20 depth charges were originally carried, but this increased to 35 shortly after the war began.

=== Wartime modifications ===
While under repair in May–June 1940, her aft bank of torpedo tubes were replaced by a QF three-inch (76 mm) 20 cwt (Note: "Cwt" is the abbreviation for hundredweight, 20 cwt referring to the weight of the gun.) AA gun. The ship was modified to prepare her for Arctic weather and her depth-charge stowage was increased to 38 during her late-1941 refit. In mid-1942, 'X' gun was removed, the three-inch gun repositioned there and the aft torpedo tubes were reinstalled. The quadruple Vickers machine gun mounts were replaced by shielded single mounts for 20-millimetre (0.8 in) Oerlikon AA guns; another pair of Oerlikon mounts were installed on the aft superstructure. Her original low-angle rangefinder above the bridge was replaced by a new high-angle gunnery director fitted with an analog Fuze Keeping Clock (mechanical computer) and a Type 285 gunnery radar was mounted on its roof. A Type 286PQ surface-search radar was installed on the foremast; it was replaced by a Type 291 radar in March–April 1943. The three-inch gun was replaced by a quadruple mount for 2-pounder (40 mm (1.6 in)) Mk II AA guns and the single mounts on the bridge wings were replaced by twin mounts for a total of six Oerlikons.

== Construction and career ==
The ship was ordered on 17 March 1933 from Yarrow Shipbuilders under the 1932 Programme, although her hull was sub-contracted to Vickers Armstrongs. She was laid down at their Walker, Newcastle upon Tyne shipyard on 31 July, and launched on 12 June 1934 by the wife of Rear-Admiral Reginald Henderson, Third Sea Lord and Controller of the Navy, as the third ship of her name. Faulknor was completed on 24 May 1935 at a cost of £271,886, excluding items supplied by the Admiralty such as guns, ammunition and communications equipment. Captain Marshall Clarke was her first captain, and also commander of the 6th Destroyer Flotilla (DF) of the Home Fleet. After working up in May–July, the ship to put into Portsmouth to remedy the defects revealed from 29 July to 21 September, before she could assume her proper place with her flotilla.

Faulknor, together with most of the ships of her flotilla, was sent to reinforce the Mediterranean Fleet during the Second Italo-Abyssinian War; during this time, Captain Victor Hilary Danckwerts relieved Clarke in March 1936. The ship remained there until 20 July when she began a refit at Portsmouth that lasted until 3 October. She was detached to the Mediterranean to enforce the arms embargo imposed on both sides in the Spanish Civil War by the Non-Intervention Committee during January–March 1937 and then deployed off the Spanish ports on the Bay of Biscay for another three months before returning home. Faulknor collided with the freighter SS Clan MacFadyen off Ushant on 4 August and was under repairs at Portsmouth until 28 December. She was assigned to work with the French Navy in the Mediterranean for the first three months of 1938 before returning home. Danckwerts was relieved in his turn by Captain C. S. Daniel in April. The 6th DF was renumbered the 8th Destroyer Flotilla in April 1939, five months before the start of World War II.

=== World War II ===
In September 1939, Faulknor and her 8th DF was assigned to the Home Fleet and based at Scapa Flow. In the first month of hostilities she was part of an anti-submarine hunting group centred on the aircraft carrier Ark Royal. On 14 September, the carrier was attacked by the German submarine U-39. Faulknor, in company with her sister ships Foxhound and Firedrake, sank U-39 north-west of Ireland, rescuing most of her crew. After a pair of fishing trawlers were sunk by a submarine off the Hebrides, the 6th and 8th DFs were ordered to sweep the area on 19 September. The following day, Faulknor rescued 20 crewmen from U-27 after several of her sisters sank the submarine and then resumed their normal escort duties. A month later, the ship was damaged during heavy seas while escorting the capital ships of the Home Fleet and was repaired at Scotstoun from 15 to 28 October. Two months later, she was escorting the battleship Nelson when the latter struck a magnetic mine as they were entering Loch Ewe on 4 December. Faulknor remained there for a time in case any further mining attempts were made. In February 1940, she was one of the escorts for Convoy TC 3 carrying troops from Canada to the UK. Later that month the ship rescued 10 survivors of the torpedoed freighter SS Orania on 11 February. Captain Antony de Salis assumed command of the ship and the flotilla on 19 February.

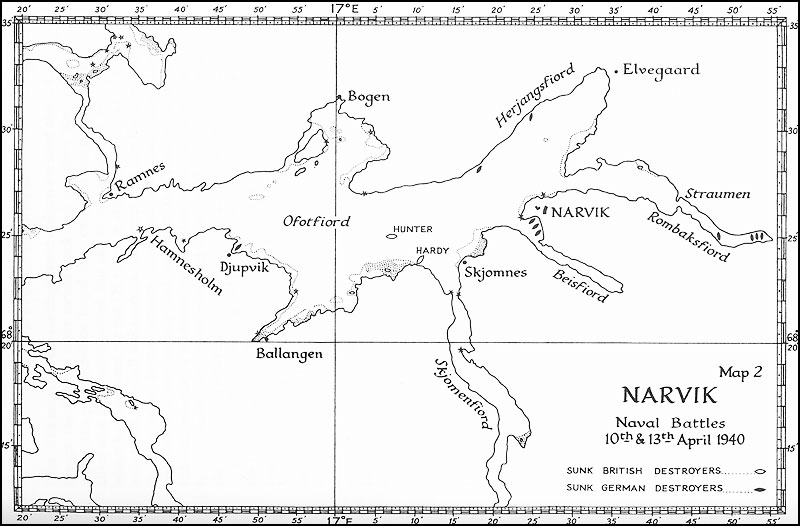
Map of the Ofotfjord

Faulknor participated in the Norwegian Campaign of April–June, screening the ships of the Home Fleet early in the campaign. After the Second Battle of Narvik on 12 April, De Salis, Captain (D) of the 8th DF and commander of Faulknor, was appointed the Senior Destroyer Officer for the Narvik area with authority over the destroyers in the area and sent them to patrol the Ofotfjord to evaluate the German defences and prevent submarines from entering. A landing party from Faulknor went ashore on 16 April to inspect the wreck of the beached German destroyer Z19 Hermann Künne to search for useful documents and to assess her condition. They found nothing and one man was killed by a sniper. The following day, Faulknor and the destroyer Zulu bombarded the German ship and set her afire. During this time, the ship was attacked by German aircraft several times to little effect. On 25 April, she helped to land part of the 2nd Battalion, the South Wales Borderers to Bogen and Lenvik. Later she provided naval gunfire support in support of the Allied advance on Narvik. On 4 May, Faulknor rescued 52 survivors from the Polish destroyer Grom, which had been sunk by German bombers and recovered the bodies of 60 more crewmen. The next day, the ship ran aground while bombarding German defences in the Rombaksfjord, but was only lightly damaged. On the voyage home for repairs, she escorted a convoy of empty troopships. Faulknor arrived at Scapa Flow on 9 May and sailed for Grimsby for repairs.

==== Force H ====
The repairs were completed on 12 June and a week later, she escorted the battlecruiser Hood and Ark Royal, together with her sisters Fearless and Foxhound and the destroyer Escapade, from Scapa Flow to Gibraltar where they formed Force H. In early July, Faulknor screened the larger British ships during the Attack on Mers-el-Kébir, in French Algeria. During Operation MA 5, a planned carrier attack on Italian airfields in Sardinia, the destroyer Escort was torpedoed by the Italian submarine Guglielmo Marconi on 11 July after the attack had been cancelled due to lack of surprise. The torpedo blew a large hole in the ship, but the British tried to salvage her. Despite their efforts, she foundered later that morning after the destroyers Forester and Faulknor took off the survivors. A month later the ship was one of the escorts for Force H during Operation Hurry, a mission to fly off fighter aircraft for Malta and conduct an airstrike on Cagliari on 2 August. On 13 September, Force H rendezvoused with a convoy that was carrying troops for the capture Dakar from the Vichy French. Ten days later, they attacked Dakar, but were driven off by the Vichy French defences. In early October, Faulknor escorted a troop convoy from Freetown, Sierra Leone, to French Cameroon. She then returned to Gibraltar and escorted the aircraft carriers Argus and Ark Royal during Operation Coat and Operation White in November. On 21 November, Faulknor, together with the light cruiser Despatch and Forester, intercepted the Vichy French blockade runner MV Charles Plumier and escorted her to Gibraltar. The ship escorted Force F to Malta during Operation Collar later in the month and participated in the inconclusive Battle of Cape Spartivento on 27 November. The following month Faulknor covered another convoy to Malta and went to the assistance of Convoy WS 5A after it had been attacked by the German heavy cruiser Admiral Hipper.

In early January, she screened Force H during Operation Excess. Later that month, Faulknor and Forester temporarily relieved some of the escorts for Convoy WS 5B bound for Egypt via the Cape of Good Hope and stayed with the convoy to Freetown. Before arriving there on 26 January, they were detached from Force H to reinforce the Freetown Escort Force. Faulknor rescued four survivors from the oil tanker SS British Premier on 3 February after they had been at sea for 41 days. Their stay in Freetown did not last long as they were ordered to escort Convoy SL 67 and the battleship Malaya en route back to Gibraltar in late February. The slow convoy was attacked by two U-boats that sank five ships from the convoy on 8 March, with the destroyers rescuing some of the survivors. Later that day, the German battleships Gneisenau and Scharnhorst spotted the convoy, but Admiral Günther Lütjens declined to attack when Malaya was spotted. Force H rendezvoused with the convoy three days later and Faulknor and Forester arrived back in Gibraltar on 16 March. Faulknor spent most of the rest of the month refitting.

On 2–4 April, the ship led the escorts for Ark Royal as she flew off more fighters bound for Malta and repeated the mission three weeks later. In early May she was part of the destroyer screen with five other destroyers for the battleship Queen Elizabeth, and the light cruisers Naiad, Fiji and Gloucester which were joining the Mediterranean Fleet. This was part of Operation Tiger which included a supply convoy taking tanks to the Middle East and the transfer of warships. Faulknor and the other F-class destroyers had their Two-Speed Destroyer Sweep (TSDS) minesweeping gear rigged to allow them to serve as a fast minesweepers en route to Malta. Despite this, one merchant ship was sunk by mines and another damaged. Later that month, she participated in Operation Splice, another Club Run in which the carriers Ark Royal and Furious flew off fighters for Malta.

Force H was ordered to join the escort of Convoy WS 8B in the North Atlantic on 24 May, after the Battle of the Denmark Strait on 23 May, but they were directed to search for the German battleship Bismarck and Prinz Eugen on 25 May. Heavy seas increased fuel consumption for all of the escorts and Faulknor was forced to return to Gibraltar to refuel later that day before rejoining the capital ships of Force H on 29 May, after the Last battle of the battleship Bismarck. In early June the destroyer participated in two more aircraft delivery missions to Malta (Operations Rocket and Tracer). On 16 June, after German blockade runners reached France, Force H sortied into the Atlantic on a search for more blockade runners. Together with Fearless, Foresight, Forester and Foxhound, Faulknor helped to sink U-138 on 18 June. Four days later, the 8th DF was sent to intercept a German supply ship heading towards the French coast. The next day they spotted MV Alstertor which was scuttled by her crew upon the approach of the British ships. They rescued 78 British POWs taken from ships sunk by German raiders as well as the crew. In late June, Faulknor screened Ark Royal and Furious as they flew off more fighters for Malta in Operation Railway.

During a Malta supply convoy (Operation Substance), the ship went to the assistance of Fearless on 23 July, after she had been crippled and set afire by Italian torpedo-bombers, but she could not be safely towed back to Gibraltar and had to be sunk by Forester's torpedoes. A week later Faulknor screened the capital ships of Force H as they covered another Malta convoy (Operation Style). On the return voyage, her turbines broke down, but she was able to limp to Gibraltar after the port turbine was repaired. An inspection revealed that some of the blades in the starboard turbine had fractured. As the dockyard lacked the spare parts and the heavy lifting gear necessary, Faulknor was ordered home for a complete refit. She was assigned as the senior ship of Convoy HG 70 despite being limited to a speed of 18 knots (33 km/h; 21 mph) and her convoy reached Londonderry on 16 August without having lost a ship. Two days later the ship began a refit in Southampton that was not completed until 9 November.

==== Arctic and Atlantic convoys ====
Faulknor was assigned to the Home Fleet at Scapa Flow after the completion of her refit, and led the escort for the battleship Duke of York as she ferried Prime Minister Winston Churchill to meet with the U.S. president Franklin D. Roosevelt in the Atlantic Conference in mid-December. Faulknor and Foresight suffered weather damage en route, and were forced to break off and seek refuge in the Azores, Portugal, before returning to Scapa Flow on 23 December.

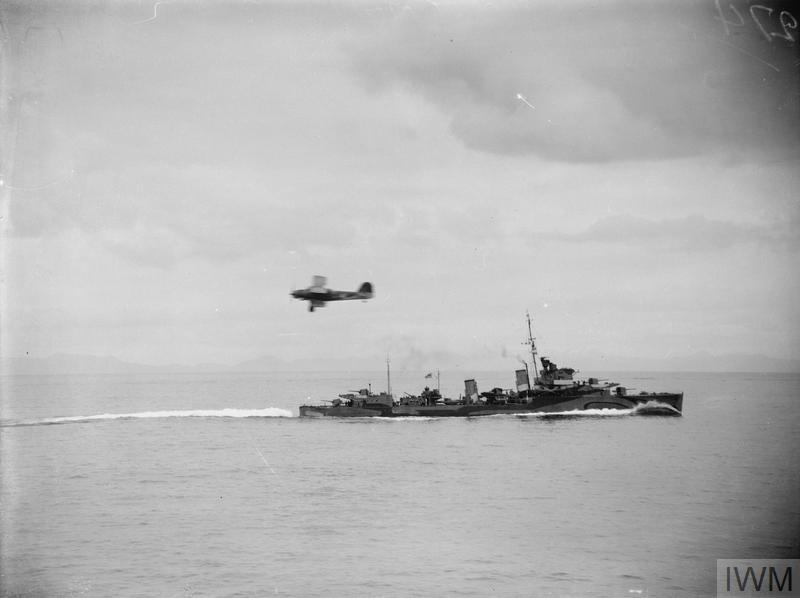
A Fairey Albacore torpedo bomber from the aircraft carrier Victorious overflies Faulknor in May 1942

On 27 January 1942, Captain Alan Scott-Moncrieff relieved de Salis. she was deployed with units of the Home Fleet escorting convoys to Russia. Scott-Moncrieff commanded the close escort for Convoy PQ 9/10 and the returning Convoy QP 7 in February, and, while escorting the covering force for Convoy PQ 12 at the beginning of March, was ordered to assist the damaged light cruiser Sheffield after she had encountered a drifting mine. After escorting her to Seidisfjord, Iceland, Faulknor rejoined the covering force on 9 March, shortly before it turned back for Scapa Flow. Several days later, the ship led a destroyer sweep off the Norwegian coast on an unsuccessful search for the German battleship Tirpitz, arriving back at Scapa on 14 March. After some repairs for some weather damage, Scott-Moncrieff again commanded the escorts for the covering force for Convoy PQ 13 and the returning Convoy QP 9 at the end of the month.

On 1 April Faulknor led a force of five other destroyers that were to escort ten Norwegian merchant ships attempting to reach Britain from Sweden via the Skagerrak. The Germans were expecting the breakout and damaged or sank six of them while causing two others to return to Sweden. Faulknor sank the burning SS Rigmor after her crew had been taken off by another destroyer, despite attacks by the Luftwaffe. As usual, she led the escorts of the distant covering force for Convoy PQ 14, 11–18 April, Convoy PQ 15, 22 April – 5 May and Convoy PQ 16, 23–30 May, and then Convoy PQ 17, 29 June – 8 July, with little incident other than the usual heavy weather. Five days later Faulknor began a refit at a shipyard at Hull that lasted until 27 August.

Type 285 fire control radar and Type 286PQ warning radar was fitted, a 3 in (76 mm) HA gun replaced the 4.7-inch mounting in the X position, and the after torpedo tube mounting was replaced. She returned to convoy escort duty, screening Convoy PQ 18 in September, and sinking the U-589 south of Spitsbergen on the 12th of September. In October she escorted returning Convoy QP 15, and Convoy JW 51A in December. Further escort duty followed in 1943, escorting Convoy JW 52 in January, Convoy JW 53 in February, and Convoy RA 53 in March. In April she was detached for convoy escort duties in the North Atlantic with the Flotilla as the 4th Escort Group, escorting convoys HX 234, SC 127, ONS 6, ONS 182, and HX 239.

==== Mediterranean and Aegean ====
In June 1943 Faulknor rejoined the 8th Destroyer Flotilla for Fleet duties in the Mediterranean, arriving at Alexandria on 5 July to support the Allied invasion of Sicily (Operation Husky). She served as part of the screen for the covering force in the Ionian Sea (two aircraft carriers, three battleships, and four cruisers with 17 other Allied destroyers). After screening and patrol duties in August, she supported Allied Allied invasion of Italy in Operation Baytown and at Salerno (Operation Avalanche) with destroyers of 4th, 8th and 24th Flotillas. She was then detached with other destroyers to screen ships escorting the Italian Fleet to Alexandria via Malta, and then was transferred to the Eastern Mediterranean to support Allied operations in the Dodecanese Campaign. She transported troops to Leros, carried out patrols, sank several cargo ships and landing craft, and carried out bombardments of shore positions before the operation was abandoned in November.

In December Faulknor supported military operations on the west coast of Italy, escorting the landing ships Royal Ulsterman and Princess Beatrix with No. 9 Commando for a landing north of the Garigliano (Operation Partridge), then carrying out diversionary bombardments. In January 1944 she took part in the landings at Anzio (Operation Shingle), providing naval gunfire support and anti-aircraft defence during the initial landings, then as a patrol and escort ship into March.

==== Normandy and the Channel ====
In April 1944, Faulknor returned to Scapa Flow to support the Normandy landings (Operation Neptune) joining ten other destroyers in Force J of the Eastern Task Force and to bombard the beach defences west of La Riviere. On 27 April she sailed to the Solent for exercises. She sailed for Normandy on 4 June, but was recalled when the operation was postponed for 24 hours. On the 5th she sailed with Convoy J1, made up of the 9th Minesweeping Flotilla, four Danlayers, a Harbour Defence Motor Launch and the 1st Division of 159 BYMS Flotilla. On the morning on 6 June she provided naval gunfire support off Juno Beach, returning to Portsmouth to re-ammunition later in the day. On 7 June she returned to Normandy with General Sir Bernard Montgomery, the Allied Land Forces Commander, on board for transport to the beachhead to set up his Tactical HQ. Montgomery's insistence that the ship approach the beach as close as possible led to her running aground on a sandbank and she had to wait for the next high tide before being refloated with the aid of a tug. She was then deployed on patrols, anti-aircraft defence, and ferrying duties. On the 24th she embarked the First Sea Lord Admiral of the Fleet Andrew Cunningham, the Second Sea Lord Admiral Algernon Willis, the Naval Secretary Admiral Cecil Harcourt, and the Lord Privy Seal Lord Beaverbrook at Portsmouth to visit the Assault Area. After arrival the flag of Admiral Bertram Ramsay, the Allied naval commander was worn during a visit by Admiral Alan G. Kirk, the U.S. naval commander. She returned to Portsmouth with her passengers same day.

Montgomery had persistently ordered the destroyer closer to shore, resulting in damage to the Sonar sensor which was situated under the hull. Following this, Faulknor was released from duty in July and sailed to Grimsby for repairs. In September she was deployed for support and convoy defence duty in the Channel, and in October joined the 14th Escort Group based at Milford Haven, employed in the Irish Sea, English Channel and the South-West Approaches. In December she rejoined the reformed 8th Destroyer Flotilla at Plymouth, and was deployed for the defence of Channel convoys. On 8 May 1945 she accepted the surrender of the German garrison at Saint Peter Port, Guernsey, and on the 17 May escorted six German minesweepers and two patrol boats to the UK. On 6 June she escorted the cruiser Jamaica taking King George VI to visit the Channel Islands.

=== Decommissioning and disposal ===
In July Faulknor was reduced to the Reserve and de-stored at Plymouth, then sailed to Dartmouth to decommission on the 25th. She was put on the Disposal List in December 1945, and was sold on 21 January 1946 to BISCO for breaking-up by Thos. W. Ward at Milford Haven. After being stripped of equipment at Plymouth in March she was towed to the breaker's yard, arriving on 4 April 1946.

== Bibliography ==
- Admiralty Historical Section (2002). The Royal Navy and the Mediterranean, November 1940 – December 1941. Whitehall Histories Naval Staff Histories. Vol. II. London: Whitehall History in association with Frank Cass. ISBN 0-7146-5205-9.
- Colledge, J. J.; Warlow, Ben (2006) [1969]. Ships of the Royal Navy: The Complete Record of All Fighting Ships of the Royal Navy from the 15th Century to the Present (3rd Rev ed.). London: Chatham Publishing. ISBN 978-1-86176-281-8. OCLC 67375475.
- English, John (1993). Amazon to Ivanhoe: British Standard Destroyers of the 1930s. Kendal, England: World Ship Society. ISBN 0-905617-64-9.
- Friedman, Norman (2009). British Destroyers From Earliest Days to the Second World War. Annapolis, Maryland: Naval Institute Press. ISBN 978-1-59114-081-8.
- Haarr, Geirr H. (2010). The Battle for Norway: April–June 1940. Barnsley, UK: Seaforth Publishing. ISBN 978-1-84832-057-4.
- Lenton, H. T. (1998). British & Empire Warships of the Second World War. Annapolis, Maryland: Naval Institute Press. ISBN 1-55750-048-7.
- March, Edgar J. (1966). British Destroyers: A History of Development, 1892–1953; Drawn by Admiralty Permission From Official Records & Returns, Ships' Covers & Building Plans. London: Seeley Service. OCLC 164893555.
- Montgomery, Bernard Law (1958). The Memoirs of Field-Marshal Montgomery. London: The Companion Book Club (Oldhams Press Ltd).
- Rohwer, Jürgen (2005). Chronology of the War at Sea 1939–1945: The Naval History of World War Two (3rd rev. ed.). Annapolis, Maryland: Naval Institute Press. ISBN 1-59114-119-2.
- Smith, Peter C. (1968). Destroyer Leader: The Story of HMS Faulknor 1935–46 (1st ed.). London: William Kimber & Co. SBN 7183-0041-6.
- Smith, Peter C. (1974) [1968]. Destroyer Leader (Pbk. repr. New English Library, London ed.). London: William Kimber. ISBN 0-450-01951-9.
- Smith, Peter C. (2004). Destroyer Leader: The Story of HMS Faulknor 1935–46 (3rd revised and expanded ed.). Barnsley: Pen & Sword Maritime. ISBN 1-84415-121-2.
- Whitley, M. J. (1988). Destroyers of World War Two: An International Encyclopedia. Annapolis, Maryland: Naval Institute Press. ISBN 0-87021-326-1.
