= HMS Fortune (H70) =

Destroyer

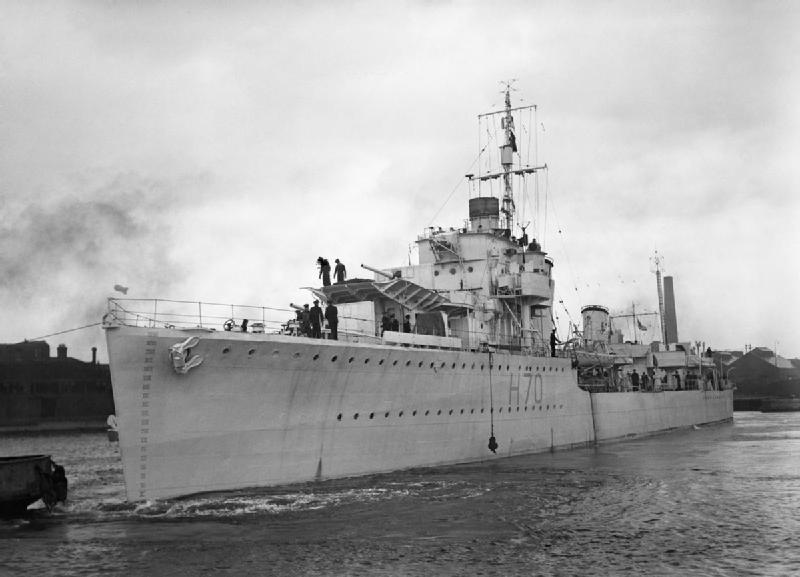
- Fortune in June 1943

History

United Kingdom
- Name: Fortune
- Builder: John Brown & Company, Clydebank
- Laid down: 25 July 1933
- Launched: 29 August 1934
- Commissioned: 27 April 1935
- Fate: Transferred to the Royal Canadian Navy, 31 May 1943

Canada
- Name: Saskatchewan
- Namesake: Saskatchewan River
- Acquired: 31 May 1943
- Commissioned: 31 May 1943
- Out of service: 28 January 1946
- Identification: Pennant number: H70
- Honours and awards: Atlantic 1943-44, Normandy 1944, Biscay 1944
- Fate: Sold for scrap, 1946

General characteristics (as built)
- Class & type: F-class destroyer
- Displacement: 1,405 long tons (1,428 t) (standard)
- Length: 329 ft (100.3 m) o/a
- Beam: 33 ft 3 in (10.13 m)
- Draught: 12 ft 6 in (3.81 m) (deep)
- Installed power: 3 × Admiralty 3-drum boilers; 36,000 shaft horsepower (27,000 kW)
- Propulsion: 2 × shafts; 2 × geared steam turbines
- Speed: 35.5 knots (65.7 km/h; 40.9 mph)
- Range: 6,350 nmi (11,760 km; 7,310 mi) at 15 knots (28 km/h; 17 mph)
- Complement: 145
- Sensors & processing systems: ASDIC
- Armament: 4 × single 4.7 in (120 mm) guns; 2 × quadruple 0.5 in (12.7 mm) machine guns; 2 × quadruple 21 in (533 mm) torpedo tubes; 20 × depth charges, 1 rack and 2 throwers

HMS Fortune was one of nine F-class destroyers built for the Royal Navy in the mid-1930s. Although she was assigned to the Home Fleet upon completion, the ship was detached to the Mediterranean Fleet to enforce the arms blockade imposed by Britain and France on both sides during the Spanish Civil War of 1936–39. Several weeks after the start of the Second World War in September 1939, Fortune helped to sink a German submarine. The ship escorted the larger ships of the fleet during the early stages of World War II and played a minor role in the Norwegian Campaign of 1940. Fortune was sent to Gibraltar in mid-1940 and formed part of Force H where she participated in the Battle of Dakar against the Vichy French. The ship escorted numerous convoys to Malta in 1940–41 until she was badly damaged by Italian bombers in mid-1941.

After repairs were completed, Fortune was briefly assigned to the Mediterranean Fleet before she was transferred to the Eastern Fleet in the Indian Ocean in early 1942. The ship screened an aircraft carrier during the Battle of Madagascar later that year and was assigned to convoy escort duties for the rest of 1942 and early 1943. She returned home in February to begin conversion into an escort destroyer. The ship was transferred to the Royal Canadian Navy (RCN) when it was completed in mid-1943 and renamed HMCS Saskatchewan. The ship spent the next year escorting convoys in the North Atlantic before she was transferred to the English Channel to defend convoys during the Normandy landings in June 1944. Saskatchewan engaged some German patrol boats the following month and was lightly damaged. She was sent to Canada for repairs and a general refit and did not return to the UK until January 1945. The ship resumed her former duties until the end of the war in May and then ferried troops back to Canada for several months. Saskatchewan was judged surplus later that year and was sold for scrap, in early 1946.

== Description ==
The F-class ships were repeats of the preceding E class. They displaced 1,405 long tons (1,428 t) at standard load and 1,940 long tons (1,970 t) at deep load. The ships had an overall length of 329 feet (100.3 m), a beam of 33 feet 3 inches (10.1 m) and a draught of 12 feet 6 inches (3.8 m). They were powered by two Brown-Curtis geared steam turbines, each driving one propeller shaft, using steam provided by three Admiralty three-drum boilers. The turbines developed a total of 36,000 shaft horsepower (27,000 kW) and gave a maximum speed of 35.5 knots (65.7 km/h; 40.9 mph). Fortune barely exceeded her designed speed during her sea trials. She carried a maximum of 470 long tons (480 t) of fuel oil that gave her a range of 6,350 nautical miles (11,760 km; 7,310 mi) at 15 knots (28 km/h; 17 mph). The ships' complement was 145 officers and ratings.

The ships mounted four 4.7-inch (120 mm) Mark IX guns in single mounts, designated 'A', 'B', 'X', and 'Y' in sequence from front to rear. For anti-aircraft (AA) defence, they had two quadruple Mark I mounts for the 0.5 inch Vickers Mark III machine gun. The F class was fitted with two above-water quadruple torpedo tube mounts for 21-inch (533 mm) torpedoes. One depth charge rack and two throwers were fitted; 20 depth charges were originally carried, but this increased to 35 shortly after the war began.

=== Wartime modifications ===
Fortune had her rear torpedo tubes replaced by a 12-pounder (76 mm) AA gun by April 1941. In February–May 1943, she was converted into an escort destroyer. A Type 286 short-range surface search radar was fitted and a Type 271 target indication radar was installed above the bridge, replacing the director-control tower and rangefinder. The ship also received a HF/DF radio direction finder mounted on a pole mainmast. Her short-range AA armament was augmented by four 20 mm (0.8 in) Oerlikon guns and the .50-calibre machine guns were replaced by a pair of Oerlikons. A split Hedgehog anti-submarine spigot mortar was installed abreast 'A' gun and stowage for a total of 70 depth charges meant that 'Y' gun, the 12-pounder and her Two-Speed Destroyer Sweep (TSDS) minesweeping gear had to be removed to compensate for their weight.

== Construction and career ==
Fortune, the 23rd ship of that name in the Royal Navy, was laid down by John Brown & Company at their Clydebank shipyard on 27 July 1933. She was launched on 29 August 1934 and completed on 27 April 1935. The ship cost 247,564 pounds, excluding government-furnished equipment like the armament. Fortune was initially assigned to the 6th Destroyer Flotilla (DF) of the Home Fleet, but detached to the Mediterranean Fleet in 1937 to enforce the arms embargo imposed on both sides in the Spanish Civil War by the Non-Intervention Committee. The 6th DF was renumbered the 8th Destroyer Flotilla in April 1939, five months before the start of World War II.

After a pair of fishing trawlers were sunk by a submarine off the Hebrides after the start of World War II in September 1939, the 6th and 8th DFs were ordered to sweep the area on 19 September. The following day, Fortune and three of her sister ships sank the German submarine U-27 and then resumed their normal escort duties. In February 1940, she was one of the escorts for Convoy TC 3 carrying troops from Canada to the UK. In the following month, while escorting units of the Home Fleet north-west of Shetland on 20 March, she was credited with sinking U-44, although later research suggests that the submarine was destroyed in a minefield which had been laid by other British destroyers on 13 March.

During the Norwegian Campaign, Fortune played a minor role escorting the oiler RFA War Pindari to Namsos on 15 April. On 25 April, she ferried part of the 2nd Battalion, the South Wales Borderers to Bogen and Lenvik. A few days later the ship escorted the aircraft carriers Ark Royal and Glorious and the battleship Valiant off the coast of Norway. In early May, she escorted two cruisers ferrying troops to occupy Iceland. In August, Fortune was briefly transferred to the 4th DF and on 10 August, the ship rescued survivors from the torpedoed armed merchant cruiser Transylvania. Later in the month, she escorted a convoy to Gibraltar and was transferred to Force H on the 28th.

=== Force H, 1940–41 ===
During Operation Hats, the ship escorted Force H while the carriers Argus and Ark Royal flew off fighter aircraft for Malta and conducted an airstrike on Cagliari on 2 August. On 13 September, Force H rendezvoused with a convoy that was carrying troops intended to capture Dakar from the Vichy French. Ten days later, they attacked Dakar where Fortune sank the French submarine Ajax on the 24th, rescuing 76 of the crew. In November, the ship escorted the carriers during Operations Coat and White as they flew off fighters for Malta and attacked the airfield at Elmas, Sardinia. During the former operation, Fortune was detached and escorted Force F to Malta, streaming her TSDS gear at the head of the convoy to serve as a fast minesweeper.

In early January 1941, she participated in Operation Excess. Three months later, Fortune and four other destroyers escorted the light cruiser HMS Sheffield, the battlecruiser Renown, and Ark Royal in Operation Winch, which delivered a dozen Hurricane fighters to Malta. Beginning on 24 April, Fortune and Force H covered Argus flying off more Hurricanes as well as the destroyers of the 5th Destroyer Flotilla sailing to Malta in Operation Dunlop. In early May she was part of the destroyer screen with five other destroyers for the battleship Queen Elizabeth, and the light cruisers Naiad, Fiji and Gloucester which were joining the Mediterranean Fleet. This was part of Operation Tiger which included a supply convoy taking tanks to the Middle East and the transfer of warships. Fortune and her sisters had their TSDS gear deployed en route to Malta. Despite this, one merchant ship was sunk by mines and another damaged. During the return voyage on 10 May, the ship was badly damaged by a 250-kilogram (550 lb) bomb that detonated nearby. The shockwave ruptured the hull, knocked out her engines, slightly bent her propeller shafts, and caused a lot of flooding. Her crew jettisoned nearly 18,000 pounds (8,200 kg) of topweight and she was able to reach a speed of 12 knots (22 km/h; 14 mph) en route to Gibraltar for temporary repairs. Fortune then sailed to Chatham Royal Dockyard for permanent repairs that lasted until November.

Although she returned to Gibraltar that same month, the ship did not become fully operational and mechanical problems restricted her to local duties until February 1942. On the 9th of that month, Fortune escorted the light cruiser Cleopatra to Malta and then escorted her and a convoy including the transport MV Breconshire to Alexandria, Egypt where they arrived on the 17th. She was transferred to the 2nd DF of the Eastern Fleet and arrived at Trincomalee, Ceylon on 7 March. Admiral James Somerville, commander of the fleet, assigned her to screen the slow ships of Force B as he organised his forces in anticipation of the Japanese Indian Ocean Raid. On 4 April, the ship rescued 88 survivors from the torpedoed freighter MV Glenshiel. Fortune returned to the Mediterranean to participate in Operation Vigorous, a convoy from Alexandria to Malta, in June. After the ship returned to the Indian Ocean, she was assigned to the 12th DF and escorted the carrier Illustrious when that ship supported operations on Madagascar in September. Fortune spent the rest of the year and the first part of 1943 escorting convoys in the Indian Ocean until she was sent home in February for conversion into an escort destroyer.

=== HMCS Saskatchewan ===
Upon completion of the conversion, the ship was transferred to the RCN on 31 May, renamed Saskatchewan, and then gifted to Canada on 15 June 1943. She was assigned to Escort Group C3, of the Mid-Ocean Escort Force, as the "Senior Officer's" ship, which was based in Londonderry Port. The ship remained with the group until she was transferred to the 12th Escort Group in May 1944 where she later patrolled the western entrance to the English Channel after the Normandy landings to protect shipping from German attacks.

Together with the destroyers Qu'Appelle, Skeena, and Restigouche, Saskatchewan attacked three German patrol boats off Brest on the night of 5–6 July, with sinking the German patrol boat V715. Saskatchewan was lightly damaged and suffered one man dead and four wounded. The ship was sent to Canada for a refit and arrived at Halifax on 6 August. She began her refit at Shelburne, Nova Scotia which lasted until November. More work was required at St. John's, Newfoundland and Saskatchewan did not return to Britain until January 1945.

Upon her arrival, she was assigned first to the 14th Escort Group and then the 11th Escort Group. With the end of the war on 9 May, the ship ferried Canadian troops back home, arriving on 30 May. She made four voyages between St John's and Quebec City before being declared surplus on 23 September, although the ship was not paid off until 28 January 1946 at Sydney, Nova Scotia. Saskatchewan was sold later that year to the International Iron & Metal Co. for scrap.

== Ship's bell ==
The ship's bell of Saskatchewan is currently at the Vancouver Island Military Museum in Nanaimo, British Columbia. The Christening Bells Project at Canadian Forces Base Esquimalt Naval and Military Museum includes information from the ship's bell of Saskatchewan, which was used for baptism of babies on board ship.

== Bibliography ==
- Admiralty Historical Section (2002). The Royal Navy and the Mediterranean. Whitehall histories., Naval Staff histories. Vol. 2, November 1940 – December 1941. London: Whitehall History in association with Frank Cass. ISBN 0-7146-5205-9.
- Colledge, J. J.; Warlow, Ben (2006) [1969]. Ships of the Royal Navy: The Complete Record of All Fighting Ships of the Royal Navy from the 15th Century to the Present (3rd Rev ed.). London: Chatham Publishing. ISBN 978-1-86176-281-8. OCLC 67375475.
- English, John (1993). Amazon to Ivanhoe: British Standard Destroyers of the 1930s. Kendal, England: World Ship Society. ISBN 0-905617-64-9.
- Forbes, Donald, Two Small Ships, Hutchinson, London 1957. Memoir of an officer who served in HMS Fortune.
- Friedman, Norman (2009). British Destroyers From Earliest Days to the Second World War. Annapolis, Maryland: Naval Institute Press. ISBN 978-1-59114-081-8.
- Haarr, Geirr H. (2010). The Battle for Norway: April–June 1940. Barnsley, UK: Seaforth Publishing. ISBN 978-1-84832-057-4.
- Lenton, H. T. (1998). British & Empire Warships of the Second World War. Annapolis, Maryland: Naval Institute Press. ISBN 1-55750-048-7.
- MacPherson, Ken & Barrie, Ron (2002). The Ships of Canada's Naval Forces 1910–2002. St. Catharines, Ontario: Vanwell. ISBN 1-55125-072-1.
- March, Edgar J. (1966). British Destroyers: A History of Development, 1892–1953; Drawn by Admiralty Permission From Official Records & Returns, Ships' Covers & Building Plans. London: Seeley Service. OCLC 164893555.
- Rohwer, Jürgen (2005). Chronology of the War at Sea 1939–1945: The Naval History of World War Two (Third Revised ed.). Annapolis, Maryland: Naval Institute Press. ISBN 1-59114-119-2.
- Smith, Peter C. (2004). Destroyer Leader: The Story of HMS Faulknor 1935–46 (3rd revised and expanded ed.). Barnsley, South Yorkshire, UK: Pen & Sword Maritime. ISBN 1-84415-121-2.
- Whitley, M. J. (1988). Destroyers of World War Two: An International Encyclopedia. Annapolis, Maryland: Naval Institute Press. ISBN 0-87021-326-1.
