= German submarine U-27 (1936) =

German World War II submarine

Coordinates: 58°35′N 09°02′W

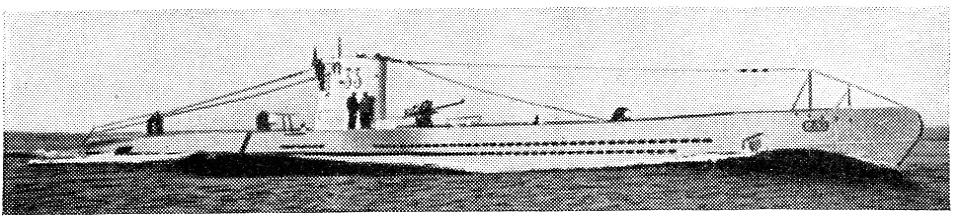
- U-33, a typical Type VIIA boat

History

Nazi Germany
- Name: U-27
- Ordered: 1 April 1935
- Builder: DeSchiMAG AG Weser, Bremen
- Cost: 4,189,000 ℛ︁ℳ︁
- Yard number: 908
- Laid down: 11 November 1935
- Launched: 24 June 1936
- Commissioned: 12 August 1936
- Fate: Sunk, 20 September 1939

General characteristics
- Class & type: Type VIIA submarine
- Displacement: 626 tonnes (616 long tons) surfaced; 745 t (733 long tons) submerged
- Length: 64.51 m (211 ft 8 in) o/a; 45.50 m (149 ft 3 in) pressure hull
- Beam: 5.85 m (19 ft 2 in) o/a; 4.70 m (15 ft 5 in) pressure hull
- Height: 9.50 m (31 ft 2 in)
- Draught: 4.37 m (14 ft 4 in)
- Installed power: 2,100–2,310 PS (1,540–1,700 kW; 2,070–2,280 bhp) (diesels); 750 PS (550 kW; 740 shp) (electric)
- Propulsion: 2 shafts; 2 × diesel engines; 2 × electric motors
- Speed: 17 knots (31 km/h; 20 mph) surfaced; 8 knots (15 km/h; 9.2 mph) submerged
- Range: 6,200 nmi (11,500 km; 7,100 mi) at 10 knots (19 km/h; 12 mph) surfaced; 73–94 nmi (135–174 km; 84–108 mi) at 4 knots (7.4 km/h; 4.6 mph) submerged
- Test depth: 220 m (720 ft); Crush depth: 230–250 m (750–820 ft)
- Complement: 4 officers, 40–56 enlisted
- Sensors & processing systems: Gruppenhorchgerät
- Armament: 5 × 53.3 cm (21 in) torpedo tubes (four bow, one stern); 11 × torpedoes or 26 × TMA or 39 × TMB tube-launched mines; 1 × 8.8 cm (3.46 in) deck gun (220 rounds); 1 × 2 cm (0.79 in) AA gun (4,380 rounds)

Service record
- Part of: 2nd U-boat Flotilla; 12 August 1936 – 20 September 1939
- Identification codes: M 08 129
- Commanders: Kptlt. / K.Kapt. Hans Ibbeken; 12 August 1936 – 4 October 1937; Kptlt. Johannes Franz; 5 October 1937 – 5 June 1939; Kapt.z.S. Hans-Georg von Friedeburg; 6 June – 8 July 1939; Kptlt. Johannes Franz; 8 July – 20 September 1939
- Operations: 1 patrol: 23 August – 20 September 1939
- Victories: 2 merchant ships sunk (624 GRT)

German submarine U-27 was a Type VIIA U-boat of Nazi Germany's Kriegsmarine built for service in World War II. Her keel was laid down in November 1935 in Bremen. She was commissioned in August 1936 with Korvettenkapitän Hans Ibbeken in command. Ibbeken was relieved on 4 October 1937, by Johannes Franz, who commanded the boat until 6 June 1939 when Hans-Georg von Friedeburg assumed command for barely one month. He was relieved on 8 July again by Johannes Franz, who commanded the boat until her loss on 20 September 1939.

U-27 had a very short career, with only one war patrol and only two enemy ships sunk. Following the sinking of two British trawlers, Davara on 13 September and Rudyard Kipling on 16 September, U-27 was hunted down and sunk west of Lewis, Scotland, by depth charges from the British destroyers HMS Fortune, Faulknor and Forester. All 38 crewmen survived and were made prisoner for the remainder of the war.

== Construction and design ==
=== Construction ===
U-27 was ordered by the Kriegsmarine on 1 April 1935 in violation of the Treaty of Versailles. Her keel was laid down in the AG Weser shipyard in Bremen as yard number 908 on 11 November 1935. After about nine months of construction, she was launched on 24 June 1936 and commissioned into the Kriegsmarine as the second Type VIIA submarine, (after U-33, which was commissioned a few months earlier), on 12 August under the command of Korvettenkapitän Hans Ibbeken.

=== Design ===
Like all Type VIIA submarines, U-27 displaced 626 tonnes (616 long tons) on the surface and 745 t (733 long tons) submerged. She was 64.51 m (211 ft 8 in) in overall length and had a 45.50 m (149 ft 3 in) pressure hull. U-27's propulsion consisted of two MAN 6-cylinder 4-stroke M 6 V 40/46 diesel engines that totaled 2,100–2,310 PS (1,540–1,700 kW; 2,070–2,280 bhp) at maximum between 470 and 485 rpm giving a maximum speed of 17 knots (31 km/h; 20 mph) on the surface and a range of 6,200 nmi (11,500 km; 7,100 mi) at 10 knots (19 km/h; 12 mph). The submarine was also equipped with two Brown, Boveri & Cie GG UB 720/8 electric motors that totaled 750 PS (550 kW; 740 shp). Their maximum rpm was 322 and they could propel the submarine 95 nmi (176 km; 109 mi) at 4 knots (7.4 km/h; 4.6 mph) when submerged, with an underwater maximum speed of 8 knots (15 km/h; 9.2 mph). The U-boat's test depth was 220 m (720 ft), but she could go as deep as 230–250 m (750–820 ft) without having her hull crushed. U-27's armament consisted of five 53.3 cm (21 in) torpedo tubes (four located in the bow and one in the stern). She could have up to 11 torpedoes on board or 22 TMA mines or 33 TMB mines. U-27 was also equipped with an 8.8 cm (3.5 in) L/45 deck gun with 220 rounds. Her anti-aircraft defenses consisted of one 2 cm (0.79 in) anti-aircraft gun. U-27 had a crew of four officers and 40 to 56 enlisted men.

== Service history ==
U-27 had a very short career, conducting only one war patrol and sinking only two enemy vessels before she herself was sunk. She left Wilhelmshaven on her first war patrol on 23 August 1939. For a period of 24 days, she traveled down the coast of Germany and neutral Belgium and the Netherlands, through the English Channel and out into the Atlantic Ocean off the coast of Ireland. Here, the boat sank two British trawlers, totaling 624 GRT. The first attack took place at 2:55 on 13 September, 21 nmi (39 km; 24 mi) northwest of Tory Island, when the trawler Davara was shelled by U-27's deck gun. Following the sinking of Davara, her captain and 11 other crew members were picked up by the steam merchant ship Willowpool. The second vessel to be sunk was the trawler Rudyard Kipling. The attack took place at 3:53 on 16 September, 100 nmi (190 km; 120 mi) west of the west coast of neutral Ireland, with the ship being sunk by scuttling charges from U-27. Following the sinking of Rudyard Kipling, the submarine picked up the crew of the trawler who were then given food and warm clothes. Eight hours later, Rudyard Kipling's crew were allowed to re-enter their lifeboats to row the remaining 5 nmi (9.3 km; 5.8 mi) to Ireland.

=== Fate ===
The destroyers HMS Fortune and HMS Faulknor (who sank U-39 six days earlier), had been part of a concerted effort to find and sink the U-Boat that had been attacking trawlers. On 20 September 1939, three torpedoes were fired at the warships, but failed to do any damage when they exploded prematurely. The British vessels replied with a series of depth charge attacks, one of which damaged the German submarine sufficiently to force her to the surface. Fortune's ramming attack was curtailed when it became apparent that the U-Boat was surrendering. All 38 crewmen survived and were taken prisoner. U-27 became the second German submarine to be sunk in World War II after U-39 was sunk on 14 September 1939.

U-27's skipper, Kapitänleutnant Johannes Franz was able, via code, to inform Bdu, the U-boat high command, of the situation regarding the malfunctioning torpedoes from his prison camp.

== Summary of raiding history ==
Date	Name	Nationality	Tonnage (GRT)	Fate
13 September 1939	Davara	United Kingdom	291	Sunk
16 September 1939	Rudyard Kipling	United Kingdom	333	Sunk

== See also ==
- Battle of the Atlantic (1939-1945)

== Bibliography ==
- "U-1163 Type VIIA". ubootwaffe.net. Archived from the original on 11 December 2008.
- Helgason, Guðmundur. "The Type VIIA boat U-27". German U-boats of WWII - uboat.net.
- Helgason, Guðmundur. "War Patrols by German U-boat U-27". German U-boats of WWII - uboat.net.
- Gröner, Erich; Jung, Dieter; Maass, Martin (1991). U-boats and Mine Warfare Vessels. German Warships 1815–1945. Vol. 2. Translated by Thomas, Keith; Magowan, Rachel. London: Conway Maritime Press. ISBN 0-85177-593-4.
- Helgason, Guðmundur. "Darava (Steam trawler)". German U-boats of WWII - uboat.net.
- Helgason, Guðmundur. "Patrol info for U-27 (First patrol)". German U-boats of WWII - uboat.net.
- Kemp, Paul (1999). U-Boats Destroyed - German Submarine Losses in the World Wars. London: Arms & Armour. ISBN 1-85409-515-3.
- Helgason, Guðmundur. "U-boat Losses - 1939". German U-boats of WWII - uboat.net.
- Helgason, Guðmundur. "Ships hit by U-27". German U-boats of WWII - uboat.net.
