= German submarine U-741 =

German World War II submarine

Coordinates: 50°02′N 00°36′W

History

Nazi Germany
- Name: U-741
- Ordered: 5 June 1941
- Builder: Schichau-Werke, Danzig
- Yard number: 1544
- Laid down: 30 April 1942
- Launched: 4 February 1943
- Commissioned: 10 April 1943
- Fate: Sunk on 15 August 1944

General characteristics
- Class & type: Type VIIC submarine
- Displacement: 769 tonnes (757 long tons) surfaced; 871 t (857 long tons) submerged
- Length: 67.10 m (220 ft 2 in) o/a; 50.50 m (165 ft 8 in) pressure hull
- Beam: 6.20 m (20 ft 4 in) o/a; 4.70 m (15 ft 5 in) pressure hull
- Height: 9.60 m (31 ft 6 in)
- Draught: 4.74 m (15 ft 7 in)
- Installed power: 2,800–3,200 PS (2,100–2,400 kW; 2,800–3,200 bhp) (diesels); 750 PS (550 kW; 740 shp) (electric)
- Propulsion: 2 shafts; 2 × diesel engines; 2 × electric motors
- Speed: 17.7 knots (32.8 km/h; 20.4 mph) surfaced; 7.6 knots (14.1 km/h; 8.7 mph) submerged
- Range: 8,500 nmi (15,700 km; 9,800 mi) at 10 knots (19 km/h; 12 mph) surfaced; 80 nmi (150 km; 92 mi) at 4 knots (7.4 km/h; 4.6 mph) submerged
- Test depth: 230 m (750 ft); Crush depth: 250–295 m (820–968 ft)
- Complement: 4 officers, 40–56 enlisted
- Armament: 5 × 53.3 cm (21 in) torpedo tubes (four bow, one stern); 14 × torpedoes; 1 × 8.8 cm (3.46 in) deck gun (220 rounds); 2 × twin 2 cm (0.79 in) C/30 anti-aircraft guns

Service record
- Part of: 8th U-boat Flotilla; 10 April – 31 October 1943; 1st U-boat Flotilla; 1 November 1943 – 15 August 1944
- Identification codes: M 41 306
- Commanders: Oblt.z.S. Gerhard Palmgren; 10 April 1943 – 15 August 1944
- Operations: 5 patrols: 1st patrol: 25 November 1943 – 27 January 1944; 2nd patrol: 29 February – 3 May 1944; 3rd patrol: 19 – 29 June 1944; 4th patrol: 5 – 15 July 1944; 5th patrol: 3 – 15 August 1944
- Victories: 1 warship total loss (1,625 tons)

German submarine U-741 was a Type VIIC U-boat built by F Schichau GmbH of Danzig and commissioned on 10 April 1943.

== Design ==
German Type VIIC submarines were preceded by the shorter Type VIIB submarines. U-741 had a displacement of 769 tonnes (757 long tons) when at the surface and 871 tonnes (857 long tons) while submerged. She had a total length of 67.10 m (220 ft 2 in), a pressure hull length of 50.50 m (165 ft 8 in), a beam of 6.20 m (20 ft 4 in), a height of 9.60 m (31 ft 6 in), and a draught of 4.74 m (15 ft 7 in). The submarine was powered by two Germaniawerft F46 four-stroke, six-cylinder supercharged diesel engines producing a total of 2,800 to 3,200 metric horsepower (2,060 to 2,350 kW; 2,760 to 3,160 shp) for use while surfaced, two AEG GU 460/8–27 double-acting electric motors producing a total of 750 metric horsepower (550 kW; 740 shp) for use while submerged. She had two shafts and two 1.23 m (4 ft) propellers. The boat was capable of operating at depths of up to 230 metres (750 ft).

The submarine had a maximum surface speed of 17.7 knots (32.8 km/h; 20.4 mph) and a maximum submerged speed of 7.6 knots (14.1 km/h; 8.7 mph). When submerged, the boat could operate for 80 nautical miles (150 km; 92 mi) at 4 knots (7.4 km/h; 4.6 mph); when surfaced, she could travel 8,500 nautical miles (15,700 km; 9,800 mi) at 10 knots (19 km/h; 12 mph). U-741 was fitted with five 53.3 cm (21 in) torpedo tubes (four fitted at the bow and one at the stern), fourteen torpedoes, one 8.8 cm (3.46 in) SK C/35 naval gun, 220 rounds, and two twin 2 cm (0.79 in) C/30 anti-aircraft guns. The boat had a complement of between forty-four and sixty.

== Service history ==
On 5 July 1944, U-741 departed Brest under the protection of 4 Vorpostenboot escort trawlers. Escort Group 12, Royal Canadian Navy, detected the German force on radar and intercepted it, engaging in the vicinity of the Pierres Noires lighthouse (Battle of Pierres Noires) in the late evening. U-741 managed to escape, but one of the German escorts was sunk.

On 15 August 1944, she attacked convoy FTM-69 and torpedoed the Royal Navy Tank Landing ship HMS LST-404, 35 miles South East of St. Catherine's Point causing extensive damage and seven fatalities. Although the vessel was beached, she later broke in two and was declared a total loss. Convoy escorts counter-attacked; the corvette HMS Orchis is credited with the destruction of U-741. Orchis rescued one survivor.

The wreck was identified by marine archaeologist Innes McCartney in 2000 near the position given by the Allies.

In five patrols U-741 accounted for the total loss of one warship, for a total of 1,625 tons.

=== Wolfpacks ===
U-741 took part in six wolfpacks, namely:

- Coronel 1 (14 – 17 December 1943)
- Sylt (18 – 23 December 1943)
- Rügen 2 (23 – 28 December 1943)
- Rügen 1 (28 December 1943 – 7 January 1944)
- Rügen (7 – 14 January 1944)
- Preussen (7 – 22 March 1944)

== Summary of raiding history ==
Date	Ship Name	Nationality	Tonnage (Note: Merchant ship tonnages are in gross register tons. Military vessels are listed by tons displacement.)	Fate
15 August 1944	HMS LST-404	Royal Navy	1,625	Total loss

== Bibliography ==
- Busch, Rainer; Röll, Hans-Joachim (1999). German U-boat commanders of World War II : a biographical dictionary. Translated by Brooks, Geoffrey. London, Annapolis, Md: Greenhill Books, Naval Institute Press. ISBN 1-55750-186-6.
- Busch, Rainer; Röll, Hans-Joachim (1999). Der U-Boot-Krieg, 1939-1945: Deutsche U-Boot-Verluste von September 1939 bis Mai 1945 [German U-boat losses from September 1939 to May 1945] (in German). Vol. IV. Hamburg, Berlin, Bonn: Mittler. ISBN 3-8132-0514-2.
- Gröner, Eric; Jung, Dieter; Maass, Martin (1991). German Warships 1815-1945: U-boats and Mine Warfare Vessels. Vol. 2. Translated by Thomas, Keith; Magowan, Rachel. London: Conway Maritime Press. ISBN 0-85177-593-4.
