= Battle of Pierres Noires =

- Part of World War II, Battle of the Atlantic, Invasion of Normandy
Date	5 July 1944
Location	Iroise Sea, near Pierres Noires lighthouse 48°12′42″N 4°54′53″W
Result	Allied victory

Belligerents
Canada	Germany

Commanders and leaders
Dickson Wallace	Gerhard Palmgren

Strength
4 destroyers	4 patrol boats 1 U-boat

Casualties and losses
	1 patrol boat sunk 1 patrol boat damaged

The Battle of Pierres Noires was a naval action that occurred during the Allied Operation Dredger, involving several Royal Canadian Navy (RCN) destroyers and a German Kriegsmarine U-boat with surface escorts near Brest, France. The RCN force managed to sink or damage some of the escorts but the U-boat was able to escape.

== Background ==
The port of Brest had been an important German U-boat base since the Fall of France, and its capture was one of the objectives of Operation Overlord. With the increasing effectiveness of the Allied anti-submarine campaign it often became essential for U-boats departing the port to have surface escorts. The German Kriegsmarine would often employ naval trawlers, Vorpostenbooten to accomplish that task, and these boats developed a reputation among the Allied navies. On 5 July 1944 Escort Group 12 and Escort Group 14 were deployed to the vicinity of Brest as part of Operation Dredger; EG 12 (Consisting of the RCN River-class destroyers HMCS Saskatchewan, Qu'Appelle, Skeena and Restigouche) was to intercept the U-boats and their escorts close inshore, while EG 14 would patrol further offshore to intercept any that managed to escape.

== Battle ==
U-741 departed Brest on 5 July 1944 under the protection of four Vorpostenboot escort trawlers. Escort Group 12, with Qu'Appelle as leader, detected the German force on radar and set off in pursuit at 30 kn (56 km/h; 35 mph). The two sides engaged in the vicinity of the Pierres Noires lighthouse in the late evening. The darkness, combined with uncertainty of the size of the German force and the close range at which the ships engaged each other nullified some of the advantage in speed and armament enjoyed by EG 12, and U-741 managed to escape. Despite inflicting some damage on all of the Canadian vessels, the Vorpostenboot V-715 was sunk, another was severely damaged, and the remainder withdrew to Brest. EG 12 withdrew to Portsmouth for repairs.

== Aftermath ==
Operation Dredger would continue with further Allied naval infiltration into the Bay of Biscay, engaging the U-boats and their escorts in their home waters. U-741 was sunk in the English Channel on 15 August, a few days after American forces began the Battle for Brest. The last U-boat departed on 4 September, just before the Americans took control of the city on 19 September. Skeena was lost in a storm off Iceland on 25 October, the only ship from EG 12 not to survive the war.

== See also ==
- Battle of Ushant (1944)
