= Rudyard Kipling (ship) =

British steam trawler

Coordinates: 53°50′N 11°10′W

- The steam trawler Rudyard Kipling.

History

United Kingdom
- Name: Rudyard Kipling
- Namesake: Rudyard Kipling
- Owner: Newington Steam Trawling Co Ltd, Hull (1920–1934); Sun Steam Trawling Co Ltd, Fleetwood (1934–1939)
- Port of registry: Hull, England (1920–1934); Fleetwood, England (1934–1939)
- Builder: Cochrane & Sons Ltd, Selby
- Yard number: 686
- Launched: 11 November 1920
- Completed: February 1921
- In service: 1920–1939
- Identification: FD 33
- Fate: Sunk on 16 September 1939

General characteristics
- Tonnage: 333 GRT
- Length: 138.8 ft (42.3 m)
- Beam: 23.7 ft (7.2 m)
- Draught: 12.9 ft (3.9 m)
- Propulsion: T.3-cylinder by C. D. Holmes & Co Ltd, Hull
- Crew: 13

Rudyard Kipling was a British steam trawler launched in 1920 that undertook fishing operations off the coasts of Great Britain and Ireland for almost 20 years. On 16 September 1939, shortly after the outbreak of World War II, the trawler was captured 40 miles (64 km) west of Clare Island by the German submarine U-27. After removing food, equipment, and the crew from the ship, the Germans sank her with the use of scuttling charges. Several hours later the crew of the Rudyard Kipling were cast adrift 5 nautical miles (9.3 km) off the coast of Ireland. They eventually landed their lifeboats at Killybegs.

Rudyard Kipling was the 27th merchant ship, the 26th British merchant ship, and the second British trawler to be sunk by a German U-boat in World War II.

== Construction and design ==
The Rudyard Kipling was constructed in the town of Selby by the shipbuilder Cochrane & Sons Ltd. The trawler was launched as yard number 686 on 11 November 1920. Named Rudyard Kipling by the ship's owner Newington Steam Trawling Co Ltd., she was registered in the port of Hull on 4 February 1921 and completed later that month. Her official number was 144068. She had a net register tonnage of 140 and her gross register tonnage was 333. The trawler was 138.8 feet (42.3 m) from bow to stern with a draught of 12.9 feet (3.9 m) and a breadth of 23.7 feet (7.2 m). Her engine was a T.3-cylinder from C. D. Holmes & Co Ltd., also of Hull.

== Service history ==
=== Early service ===
Following completion and registration, the Rudyard Kipling began fishing off of the coast of Ireland and Great Britain. Sometime in January 1929 German trawler Johs Thode sank, her crew made it to an uninhabited island off Murmansk, Soviet Union. The crew was rescued by Rudyard Kipling which turned the crew over to a Soviet gunboat for transportation to Murmansk. On 28 January 1930 the president of the Germany presented her captain, mate, chief engineer, and second engineer with two gold watches, two binoculars, and a cash reward for the rest of the crew for assisting the trawler. In May 1934, the trawler was sold to Sun Steam Trawling Co Ltd. On 10 May, her registry from Hull was closed and on 16 May, she was registered in the English port town of Fleetwood, where her new owners were based. Rudyard Kipling remained with Sun Steam Trawling for the rest of her career.

=== Sinking ===
On 16 September 1939, Rudyard Kipling left Fleetwood for a routine fishing trip to an area off the west coast of Ireland. The trawler, under the command of Skipper Charles Robinson and with a crew of 12 men, was about 100 nautical miles (190 km) west of the Irish town of Donegal when the German submarine U-27 came alongside and ordered them to pull over to the submarine and surrender. The German crew then took Rudyard Kipling's food, including sugar, bread and fish, as well as the trawler's wireless radios, and transferred them over to the U-boat. Timed explosive charges were then placed on the trawler and three minutes later, at 15:53, the trawler exploded and sank.

While raiding the trawler, the Germans took the crew of Rudyard Kipling on board and provided them with food and warm clothes. Eight hours later, in the early hours of 17 September, the Germans allowed the crew of the Rudyard Kipling to reboard their lifeboats and set them adrift 5 miles (8.0 km) west of the port town of Donegal. Sometime later the crew landed at Killybegs to the west of the town. The Rudyard Kipling was the 27th merchant ship (the 26th one to be British) and the second British trawler to be sunk by a German U-boat in World War II.
