= Davara =

British steam trawler

Coordinates: 55°31′15″N 8°37′57″W

- The steam trawler Davara.

History

United Kingdom
- Name: Davara
- Owner: Mount Steam Fishing Co. Ltd, Fleetwood
- Port of registry: Fleetwood, England
- Builder: Cochrane & Sons Ltd, Selby
- Yard number: 517
- Launched: 6 January 1912
- Completed: March 1912
- In service: 1912–1939
- Identification: FD 152
- Fate: Sunk northwest of Tory Island, 13 September 1939.

General characteristics
- Tonnage: 291 GRT
- Length: 130 ft (40 m)
- Beam: 23.5 ft (7.2 m)
- Draught: 12.5 ft (3.8 m)
- Propulsion: T.3-cylinder by Charles D. Holmes & Co. Ltd, Hull
- Crew: 12

History

United Kingdom

Davara was a British steam fishing trawler. Launched in 1912, it was requisitioned in 1914 by the Royal Navy for service in World War I and fitted out as a minesweeper. She was returned to her owners after the war and began service as a trawler once more.

On 13 September 1939, twelve days after the outbreak of World War II, U-27 intercepted the Davara on a normal fishing trip. The submarine began to shell the trawler with its deck gun. The hands managed to escape the trawler in a lifeboat, and the Davara sank at 14:55 from the damage inflicted by U-27's deck gun. Her crew remained in the water "baling and rowing" for five hours before they were picked up by the steamer Willowpool and safely made landfall. Davara was the first British trawler to be sunk by enemy action in World War II.

== Construction and design ==
Davara (Official Number 132409) was constructed in Selby by the shipbuilder Cochrane & Sons Ltd. On 6 January 1912, the trawler was launched from yard number 517. Christened the Davara by her owners, Mount Steam Fishing Co. Ltd, she was registered in the port of Fleetwood on 6 March 1912 and completed sometime later that same month. She had a net register tonnage of 116 and a gross register tonnage of 291. The trawler was 130 feet (40 m) from bow to stern, with a draught of 12.5 feet (3.8 m) and a breadth of 23.5 feet (7.2 m). Her engine consisted of a T.3-cylinder from C. D. Holmes & Co. Ltd.

== History ==
=== Early service ===
Following completion and registration, Davara began a fishing career off the coast of Ireland and Great Britain. Her service as a trawler continued for about two years uninterrupted. In November 1914, three months after the outbreak of World War I, the trawler was requisitioned for war service by the Royal Navy and furnished for minesweeping. Davara survived the war and was returned to Mount Steam Fishing Co. Ltd in 1919, beginning fishing duties anew. On 7 August 1930, the trawler was grounded on "Tiger's Tail" during the approach to Wyre Dock in Fleetwood. She was soon re-floated and safely proceeded into the dock.

=== Sinking ===
On 12 September 1939, Davara left Fleetwood for a routine fishing trip off the west coast of Ireland under the command of her skipper, William Boyles. The next day, U-27 spotted the trawler about 21 nautical miles (39 km; 24 mi) northwest by north of Tory Island. U-27 then began shelling Davara with its 8.8 cm SK C/35 deck gun, firing a total of 35 rounds at the trawler. Boyles managed to get a lifeboat into the water and all of the crew abandoned ship.

The shelling of the abandoned Davara continued a further thirty minutes, stopping at 14:55 with the trawler's sinking. The crew remained in the lifeboat for a further five hours. They were eventually picked up by the West Hartlepool steamer Willowpool and landed safely. Davara was the first British trawler, and the seventeenth ship, to be sunk by an enemy submarine in World War II.
