= German submarine U-39 (1938) =

German World War II submarine

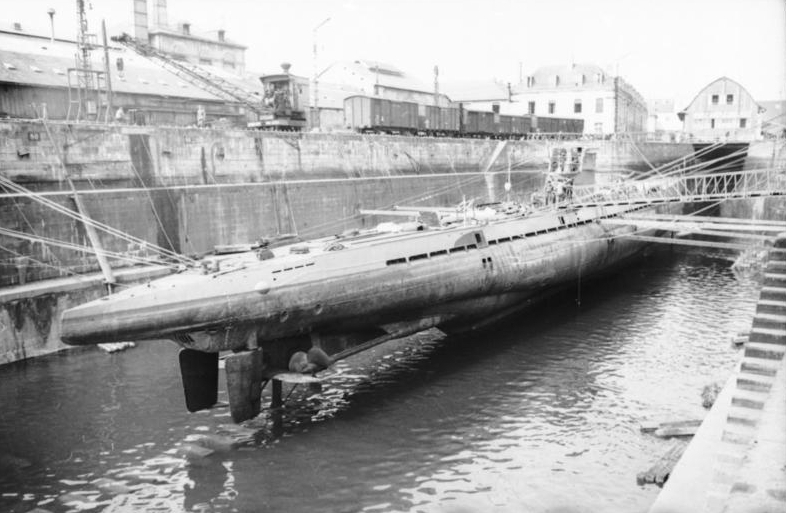
- U-37, (an identical U-boat to U-39) at Lorient in 1940

History

Nazi Germany
- Name: U-39
- Ordered: 29 July 1936
- Builder: AG Weser, Bremen
- Yard number: 944
- Laid down: 2 June 1937
- Launched: 22 September 1938
- Commissioned: 10 December 1938
- Fate: Sunk on 14 September 1939

General characteristics
- Class & type: Type IXA submarine
- Displacement: 1,032 t (1,016 long tons) surfaced; 1,153 t (1,135 long tons) submerged
- Length: 76.50 m (251 ft) o/a; 58.75 m (192 ft 9 in) pressure hull
- Beam: 6.51 m (21 ft 4 in) o/a; 4.40 m (14 ft 5 in) pressure hull
- Height: 9.40 m (30 ft 10 in)
- Draught: 4.70 m (15 ft 5 in)
- Installed power: 4,400 PS (3,200 kW; 4,300 bhp) (diesels); 1,000 PS (740 kW; 990 shp) (electric)
- Propulsion: 2 shafts; 2 × diesel engines; 2 × electric motors
- Speed: 18.2 knots (33.7 km/h; 20.9 mph) surfaced; 7.7 knots (14.3 km/h; 8.9 mph) submerged
- Range: 10,500 nautical miles (19,400 km; 12,100 mi) at 10 knots (19 km/h; 12 mph) surfaced; 65–78 nmi (120–144 km; 75–90 mi) at 4 knots (7.4 km/h; 4.6 mph) submerged
- Test depth: 230 m (750 ft)
- Complement: 4 officers, 44 enlisted
- Armament: 6 × torpedo tubes (4 bow, 2 stern); 22 × 53.3 cm (21 in) torpedoes; 1 × 10.5 cm SK C/32 naval gun (180 rounds); 1 × 3.7 cm (1.5 in) SK C/30 AA gun; 1 × twin 2 cm FlaK 30 AA guns

Service record
- Part of: 6th U-boat Flotilla; 10 December 1938 – 14 September 1939
- Identification codes: M 12 679
- Commanders: Kptlt. Gerhard Glattes; 10 December 1938 – 14 Sep 1939
- Operations: 1 patrol: 19 August – 14 September 1939
- Victories: No ships sunk or damaged

German submarine U-39 was a Type IXA U-boat of the Kriegsmarine that operated from 1938 to the first few days of World War II.

She was ordered by the Kriegsmarine on 29 July 1936 as part of the re-armament program (Aufrüstung) in Germany, which was illegal under the terms of the Treaty of Versailles. The keel for U-39 was laid down on 2 June 1937, by DeSchiMAG AG Weser of Bremen. She was commissioned on 10 December 1938 with Kapitänleutnant Gerhard Glattes in command.

On 14 September 1939, just 27 days after she began her first patrol, U-39 attempted to sink the British aircraft carrier HMS Ark Royal by firing two torpedoes at her. Due to a technical defect the torpedoes exploded before reaching their target. The U-39 was immediately hunted down by three British destroyers, HMS Foxhound, HMS Faulknor and HMS Firedrake, and disabled with depth charges. After the crew managed to resurface with the then sinking submarine all members were captured during the evacuation.

U-39 was the first German U-boat to be sunk in World War II.

== Design ==
As one of the eight original German Type IX submarines, later designated IXA, U-39 had a displacement of 1,032 tonnes (1,016 long tons) when at the surface and 1,153 tonnes (1,135 long tons) while submerged. The U-boat had a total length of 76.50 m (251 ft), a pressure hull length of 58.75 m (192 ft 9 in), a beam of 6.51 m (21 ft 4 in), a height of 9.40 m (30 ft 10 in), and a draught of 4.70 m (15 ft 5 in). The submarine was powered by two MAN M 9 V 40/46 supercharged four-stroke, nine-cylinder diesel engines producing a total of 4,400 metric horsepower (3,240 kW; 4,340 shp) for use while surfaced, two Siemens-Schuckert 2 GU 345/34 double-acting electric motors producing a total of 1,000 metric horsepower (740 kW; 990 shp) for use while submerged. She had two shafts and two 1.92 m (6 ft) propellers. The boat was capable of operating at depths of up to 230 metres (750 ft).

The submarine had a maximum surface speed of 18.2 knots (33.7 km/h; 20.9 mph) and a maximum submerged speed of 7.7 knots (14.3 km/h; 8.9 mph). When submerged, the boat could operate for 65–78 nautical miles (120–144 km; 75–90 mi) at 4 knots (7.4 km/h; 4.6 mph); when surfaced, she could travel 10,500 nautical miles (19,400 km; 12,100 mi) at 10 knots (19 km/h; 12 mph). U-39 was fitted with six 53.3 cm (21 in) torpedo tubes (four fitted at the bow and two at the stern), 22 torpedoes, one 10.5 cm (4.13 in) SK C/32 naval gun, 180 rounds, and a 3.7 cm (1.5 in) SK C/30 as well as a 2 cm (0.79 in) C/30 anti-aircraft gun. The boat had a complement of forty-eight.

== Service history ==
=== Patrol and Sinking ===
U-39 conducted only one war patrol during her entire career, as part of the 6th U-boat Flotilla. She left Wilhelmshaven with U-31, U-32, U-35 and U-53 all of which were also a part of the 6th Flotilla, on 19 August 1939, in preparation for the beginning of World War II. She headed into the North Sea and eventually circumnavigated the British Isles. Prior to her sinking, U-39 was attacked in the North Sea on 10 September while en route to the British Isles. She was depth charged by an unidentified British vessel and was forced to dive to 100 meters (328 feet) to escape the attack.

On 14 September 1939, after only 27 days at sea, U-39 fired two torpedoes at the British aircraft carrier HMS Ark Royal off Rockall Bank north-west of Scotland. Lookouts spotted the torpedo tracks and Ark Royal turned towards the attack, reducing her cross-section and causing both torpedoes to miss and explode short of their target. Following the failed attack, three British destroyers in the vicinity of the Ark Royal, HMS Faulknor, Firedrake, and Foxhound detected U-39. All three destroyers depth charged the U-boat and seconds after Firedrake released her depth charges, U-39 surfaced. Foxhound, which was the closest to the U-boat, picked up 25 crew members while Faulknor rescued 11 and Firedrake saved the remaining eight. The crewmen were then taken ashore in Scotland and spent the rest of the war in various prisoner-of-war camps, including the Tower of London, before being shipped to Canada.

U-39 was the first of many U-boats to be sunk in World War II; at 58°32′N 11°49′W.

=== Aftermath ===
Four other U-boats joined U-39 on her ill-fated patrol, U-31, U-32, U-53 and U-55. According to a report by the Seekriegsleitung (German Supreme Naval Command) on 22 September 1939, U-32 and U-53 were heading back to their home port of Kiel while only U-31 and U-35 remained in the operational area north of the British Isles. According to plan, U-39 should also have made for Kiel. However, there had been no contact with the U-boat for several days. A lack of response from U-39, despite several requests to give her current location, began to fuel rumours that she was sunk. This belief was later confirmed by a British radio transmission detailing the arrival of the first German prisoners of war who were members of the Kriegsmarine, at a London railway station a few days later.

== Bibliography ==
- Busch, Rainer; Röll, Hans-Joachim (1999). German U-boat commanders of World War II : a biographical dictionary. Translated by Brooks, Geoffrey. London, Annapolis, Md: Greenhill Books, Naval Institute Press. ISBN 1-55750-186-6.
- Busch, Rainer; Röll, Hans-Joachim (1999). Deutsche U-Boot-Verluste von September 1939 bis Mai 1945 [German U-boat losses from September 1939 to May 1945]. Der U-Boot-Krieg (in German). Vol. IV. Hamburg, Berlin, Bonn: Mittler. ISBN 3-8132-0514-2.
- Edwards, Bernard (1996). Dönitz and the Wolf Packs - The U-boats at War. Cassell Military Classics. p. 87. ISBN 0-304-35203-9.
- Gröner, Erich; Jung, Dieter; Maass, Martin (1991). U-boats and Mine Warfare Vessels. German Warships 1815–1945. Vol. 2. Translated by Thomas, Keith; Magowan, Rachel. London: Conway Maritime Press. ISBN 0-85177-593-4.
- Rossiter, Mike (2007). Ark Royal: the life, death and rediscovery of the legendary Second World War aircraft carrier. London: Corgi Books. ISBN 978-0-552-15369-0.
- Kemp, Paul (1999). U-Boats Destroyed - German Submarine Losses in the World Wars. London: Arms & Armour. ISBN 1-85409-515-3.
