= Marconi-class submarine =

Italian submarine class

- Leonardo Da Vinci, the most successful Italian submarine in World War II

Class overview
- Name: Marconi class
- Builders: Cantieri Riuniti dell'Adriatico; Odero Terni Orlando
- Operators: Regia Marina; Kriegsmarine; Imperial Japanese Navy
- In commission: 1940–1945
- Completed: 6
- Lost: 5

General characteristics
- Type: Submarine
- Displacement: 1,195 long tons (1,214 t) (surfaced); 1,490 long tons (1,514 t) (submerged)
- Length: 76.5 m (251 ft 0 in)
- Beam: 6.81 m (22 ft 4 in)
- Draught: 4.72 m (15 ft 6 in)
- Propulsion: Diesel-electric; 2 × CRDA diesel engines; 2 × Marelli electric motors
- Speed: 17.8 kn (33.0 km/h; 20.5 mph) (surfaced); 8.2 kn (15.2 km/h; 9.4 mph) (submerged)
- Range: Surfaced: 2,900 nmi (5,400 km; 3,300 mi) at 17 kn (31 km/h; 20 mph); 10,500 nmi (19,400 km; 12,100 mi) at 8 kn (15 km/h; 9.2 mph); Submerged: 8 nmi (15 km; 9.2 mi) at 8 kn (15 km/h; 9.2 mph); 110 nmi (200 km; 130 mi) at 3 kn (5.6 km/h; 3.5 mph)
- Test depth: 90 m (300 ft)+
- Complement: 57
- Armament: 8 × 533 mm (21.0 in) torpedo tubes (4 bow, 4 stern); 1 × 100 mm (4 in) / 47 caliber gun; 4 × 13.2 mm (0.52 in) machine guns

The Marconi class was a class of six submarines built for the Royal Italian Navy (Italian: Regia Marina). The submarines were all launched between 1939 and 1940, and all but one, Luigi Torelli, were lost in the Atlantic during the Second World War.

== Class members ==
=== Guglielmo Marconi ===
Guglielmo Marconi (pennant number MN) was launched 27 July 1939 and completed on 2 February 1940. On its first wartime patrol in the Mediterranean Sea, Marconi torpedoed the Royal Navy destroyer HMS Escort on 8 July 1940. Marconi sailed on 6 September 1940 and passed the Strait of Gibraltar on 11 September for an Atlantic patrol to Bordeaux on 29 September. En route Marconi sank the neutral Spanish fishing boat Almirante Jose de Carranza. Marconi sank one ship on its first BETASOM patrol from Bordeaux. After an unsuccessful patrol, Marconi sank three ships on its third BETASOM patrol and damaged a Yugoslavian freighter on the following patrol which was later sunk by U-126. Marconi was lost to unknown causes sometime after 28 October 1941 on its fifth BETASOM patrol.

Ships sunk by Marconi
Ship	Flag	Patrol	Date	Tonnage (GRT)	Notes
HMS Escort	Royal Navy	1st	8 July 1940	—N/a	Destroyer; 2 killed
Vingaland	Sweden	3rd	9 November 1940	2,734 gross register tons (GRT)	Freighter from Convoy HX 84
Cairndale	United Kingdom	5th	30 May 1941	8,129	Tanker; 4 killed
Baron Lovat	United Kingdom	5th	6 June 1941	3,395	Freighter from Convoy OG 63
Taberg	Sweden	5th	6 June 1941	1,392	Freighter from Convoy OG 63, 6 survivors from a crew of 22
Total:				17,055	

=== Leonardo da Vinci ===
Leonardo da Vinci (pennant number LV) was launched 16 September 1939. da Vinci sailed on 22 September 1940 and passed the Strait of Gibraltar on 27 September for an Atlantic patrol to Bordeaux on 31 October. After unsuccessful patrols from 21 December to 20 January 1941 and from 4 April to 4 May, da Vinci sank one ship on its third BETASOM patrol. After another unsuccessful patrol from 15 August to 24 September, da Vinci sank two ships during Operation Neuland and four ships on the following patrol. After being modified to carry a midget submarine, da Vinci sailed without the midget submarine and sank four ships. Sailing again without the midget submarine, da Vinci sank six ships on its last patrol. While attempting to return to Bordeaux, da Vinci was sunk on 23 May 1943 by the escorts of convoy KMF 15. There were no survivors. Leonardo da Vinci was the top scoring non-German submarine of the entire war.

Ships sunk by da Vinci
Ship	Flag	Patrol	Date	Tonnage (GRT)	Notes
Auris	United Kingdom	4th	28 June 1941	8,030	Tanker; 27 survivors from a crew of 59
Cadebello	Brazil	6th	25 February 1942	3,557	Freighter; no survivors
Everasma	Latvia	6th	28 February 1942	3,644	Freighter from Convoy TAW 12 torpedoed at 16°00′N 49°00′W; 15 survivors
Reine Marie Stewart	Panama	7th	2 June 1942	1,087	Schooner
Chile	Denmark	7th	7 June 1942	6,956	Freighter; 39 survivors from a crew of 44
Alioth	Netherlands	7th	10 June 1942	5,483	Freighter; 8 survivors from a crew of 36
Clan Macquarrie	United Kingdom	7th	13 June 1942	6,471	Collier; 1 killed from a crew of 90
Empire Zeal	United Kingdom	8th	2 November 1942	7,009	Freighter
Andreas	Greece	8th	5 November 1942	6,566	Freighter
Marcus Whitman	United States	8th	10 November 1942	7,176	Liberty ship; no casualties
Veerhaven	Netherlands	8th	11 November 1942	5,291	Freighter; no casualties
RMS Empress of Canada	Canada	9th	14 March 1943	21,517	Troopship; 392 killed from 1,800 aboard
Lulworth Hill	United Kingdom	9th	18 March 1943	7,628	Freighter
Sembilan	Netherlands	9th	17 April 1943	6,566	Freighter
Manar	United Kingdom	9th	18 April 1943	8,007	Freighter
John Drayton	United States	9th	21 April 1943	7,177	Liberty ship
Doryessa	United Kingdom	9th	25 April 1943	8,078	Tanker; 11 survivors from a crew of 54
Total:				120,243	

=== Michele Bianchi ===
Michele Bianchi (pennant number BH) was launched 3 December 1939. Its first war patrol was in the Mediterranean Sea from 15 August to 3 September 1940. Bianchi sailed on 27 October 1940 and reached the Strait of Gibraltar on 3 November. The attempted transit to the Atlantic was detected by Royal Navy forces; and Bianchi took refuge in the neutral port of Tangier. Bianchi sailed from Tangier on 12 November and reached Bordeaux on 18 December 1940. Bianchi sank three ships on its first BETASOM patrol from Bordeaux; but the next patrol from 30 April to 30 May 1941 was unsuccessful. After sailing from Bordeaux on 4 July 1941, Bianchi was sunk with all hands by HMS Tigris on 5 July.

Ships sunk by Bianchi
Ship	Flag	Patrol	Date	Tonnage (GRT)	Notes
Belcrest	United Kingdom	4th	14 February 1941	4,517	Freighter from Convoy SC 21; no survivors
Huntingdon	United Kingdom	4th	24 February 1941	10,946	Credit for sinking shared with U-96; no casualties
Baltistan	United Kingdom	4th	27 February 1941	6,803	Freighter; 18 survivors from a crew of 69
Total:				22,266	

=== Luigi Torelli ===
Torelli (pennant number TI) was launched 6 January 1940. After one short war patrol in the Mediterranean, Torelli sailed on 31 August 1940 and passed the Strait of Gibraltar on 8 September for an Atlantic patrol to Bordeaux on 5 October. Torelli sank four ships on its first BETASOM patrol; and, after an unsuccessful second patrol, sank one ship on a third patrol. After another unsuccessful patrol, Torelli assisted the three Calvi-class submarines on a rescue mission of 254 sailors from the sunken German auxiliary cruiser Atlantis in December 1941.

Torelli sank two ships during Operation Neuland. Torelli again sailed from Bordeaux on 2 June 1942, but was twice damaged by aircraft and sought refuge in the neutral Spanish ports of Avilés and Santander, Cantabria before returning to Bordeaux on 15 July. After an extensive refit, Torelli was again damaged at sea by aircraft on 16 March 1943 and returned to Bordeaux on 3 April. Torelli was then selected for conversion to a "transport submarine" in order to exchange rare or irreplaceable trade goods with Japan. Cargo capacity of 160 tons reduced reserve buoyancy from 20–25% to 3.5–6%; and armament was reduced to defensive machine guns. Torelli sailed as a transport submarine on 18 June 1943 and reached Penang on 27 August 1943.

==== UIT-25 ====
Torelli was commissioned into the German Kriegsmarine as UIT-25 when Italy capitulated to the Allies in September 1943.

==== I-504 ====
UIT-25 was taken over by the Imperial Japanese Navy and became I-504 when Germany surrendered in May 1945. I-504 shot down a B-25 Mitchell bomber while under Japanese flag near the very end of the war in the Pacific, allegedly the last success of a Japanese naval vessel in that conflict. It was found at Kobe when Japan surrendered and scuttled by the United States Navy in Kii Suido.

Ships sunk by Torelli
Ship	Flag	Patrol	Date	Tonnage (GRT)	Notes
Nemea	Greece	3rd	15 January 1941	5,198	Freighter; 14 survivors from a crew of 31
Brask	Norway	3rd	15 January 1941	4,079	Freighter; 20 survivors from a crew of 32
Nicolas Filinis	Greece	3rd	16 January 1941	3,111	Freighter; 26 survivors from a crew of 29
Urla	United Kingdom	3rd	28 January 1941	5,198	Freighter; no casualties
Ida Knudsen	Norway	5th	21 July 1941	8,913	Tanker; 5 killed
Scottish Star	United Kingdom	8th	19 February 1942	7,224	Freighter; 4 killed from a crew of 73
Esso Copenhagen	Panama	8th	25 February 1942	9,245	Tanker; 1 killed from a crew of 39
Total:				42,968	

=== Alessandro Malaspina ===
Alessandro Malaspina (pennant number MP) was launched 18 February 1940 and completed on 20 June 1940. Its first patrol was through the Strait of Gibraltar on 3 August for an Atlantic patrol. Malaspina sank one ship before reaching Bordeaux on 4 September. Admiral Karl Dönitz visited Malaspina on 30 September to welcome Regia Marina sailors to the German base. The first BETASOM patrols from 9 October to 9 November 1940, from 5 January to 28 February 1941 were unsuccessful; but during a third patrol Malaspina damaged the British liner Lycaon on 3 May 1941. Malaspina then sank two ships on the next patrol. Malaspina sailed from Bordeaux on 7 September 1941; and is believed to have been sunk on 10 September by No. 10 Squadron RAAF Short Sunderland "U".

Ships sunk by Malaspina
Ship	Flag	Patrol	Date	Tonnage (GRT)	Notes
British Fame	United Kingdom	1st	12 August 1940	8,406	Tanker from Convoy OB 193; 3 killed from crew of 49
Lycaon	United Kingdom	3rd	3 May 1941		Passenger Liner. Damaged
Nikiklis	Greece	4th	14 July 1941	3,576	Freighter; 11 killed from crew of 28
Guelma	United Kingdom	4th	17 July 1941	4,402	Freighter; no casualties
Total:				16,384	

=== Maggiore Baracca ===
Maggiore Baracca (pennant number BC) was launched 21 April 1940 and completed on 10 July 1940. Its first patrol was through the Strait of Gibraltar on 7 September for an Atlantic patrol. Baracca sank one ship before reaching Bordeaux on 6 October. Baracca sank one ship on its first BETASOM patrol from Bordeaux, but last four patrols were unsuccessful. On the final patrol, Baracca was sunk by HMS Croome on 7 September 1941. Thirty-two members of the submarine crew survived the sinking.

Ships sunk by Baracca
Ship	Flag	Patrol	Date	Tonnage (GRT)	Notes
Aghios Nicolaus	Greece	1st	1 October 1940	3,687	Freighter
Lilian Moller	United Kingdom	2nd	18 November 1940	4,866	Freighter; no survivors
Total:				8,553	

== See also ==
- Italian submarines of World War II
