= Italian ship Giacomo Nani =

Giacomo Nani or simply Nani was the name of at least two ships of the Italian Navy named in honour of the Venetian admiral Giacomo Nani and may refer to:

- Italian submarine Giacomo Nani, a Barbarigo-class submarine launched in 1918 and discarded in 1935.
- Italian submarine Nani, a Marcello-class submarine launched in 1938 and sunk in 1941.
