= Convoy SC 19 =

Convoy during naval battles of the Second World War

Convoy SC.19
- Part of World War II
Date	12 January – 2 February 1941
Location	North Sea
Result	German victory

Belligerents
Kriegsmarine	Royal Canadian Navy; Royal Navy

Commanders and leaders
Admiral Karl Dönitz	

Strength
~4 U-boats	28 merchant ships 11 escorts (9 during attack)

Casualties and losses
	7 ships sunk

Convoy SC 19 was the 19th of the numbered series of World War II slow convoys of merchant ships from Sydney, Cape Breton Island to Liverpool. The trade convoy left Halifax, Nova Scotia on 12 January 1941 and was found by U-boats of the 7th U-boat Flotilla on 29 January. Seven ships were sunk before the convoy reached Liverpool on 2 February.

== Ships in the convoy ==
=== Allied merchant ships ===
A total of 28 merchant vessels joined the slow convoy, composed of ships making 8 knots or less.

Name	Flag	Tonnage (GRT)	Notes
Aikaterini (1913)	Greece	4,929	1 dead. 30 survivors. Sunk by U-93
Baltara (1918)	United Kingdom	3,292	
Barrhill (1912)	United Kingdom	4,972	
Basil (1928)	United Kingdom	4,913	Commodore: Capt R Gill CBE Rd RNR
Brynhild (1907)	United Kingdom	2,195	
Carperby (1928)	United Kingdom	4,890	
Culebra (1919)	United Kingdom	3,044	
Dimitrios Chandris (1910)	Greece	4,643	Returned, must Dry-Dock
Grelrosa (1914)	United Kingdom	4,574	Straggled, bombed & sunk by a Focke-Wulf Fw 200 aircraft
King Robert (1920)	United Kingdom	5,886	Sunk by U-93
Kul (1907)	Norway	1,310	
Kyriakoula (1918)	Greece	4,340	
Merchant Royal (1928)	United Kingdom	5,008	
Penhale (1924)	United Kingdom	4,071	
Rockpool (1927)	United Kingdom	4,892	Wrecked, then salved and became Empire Trent
Rushpool (1928)	United Kingdom	5,125	Straggled and sunk by U-94
Ruth I	Norway	3,531	
Sesostris (1915)	Egypt	2,962	Straggled and sunk by U-106
Shirvan (1925)	United Kingdom	6,017	
Snar (1920)	Norway	3,176	Ashore, re-floated, beached Bannatyne Cove
Stad Arnhem (1920)	Netherlands	3,819	
Tovelil (1925)	United Kingdom	2,225	
Varanger (1925)	Norway	9,305	
Vestland (1916)	Norway	1,934	
Vigsnes (1930)	Norway	1,599	
W B Walker (1935)	United Kingdom	10,468	Sunk by U-93
West Wales (1925)	United Kingdom	4,353	Sunk by U-94 after convoy had scattered
Winkleigh (1940)	United Kingdom	5,468	

=== Convoy escorts ===
A series of armed military ships escorted the convoy at various times during its journey.

Name	Flag	Type	Joined	Left
HMS Antelope	Royal Navy	A-class destroyer	27 Jan 1941	31 Jan 1941
HMS Anthony	Royal Navy	A-class destroyer	27 Jan 1941	31 Jan 1941
HMCS Arrowhead	Royal Canadian Navy	Flower-class corvette	12 Jan 1941	12 Jan 1941
HMS Aurania	Royal Navy	Armed merchant cruiser	12 Jan 1941	26 Jan 1941
HMS Heather	Royal Navy	Flower-class corvette	26 Jan 1941	1 Feb 1941
HMS Jackal	Royal Navy	J-class destroyer	29 Jan 1941	29 Jan 1941
HMS/HMT Lady Madeleine	Royal Navy	ASW (anti-submarine warfare) trawler	26 Jan 1941	31 Jan 1941
HMS Pegasus	Royal Navy	Seaplane tender/prototype fighter catapult ship	26 Jan 1941	31 Jan 1941
HMS Picotee	Royal Navy	Flower-class corvette	26 Jan 1941	01 Feb 1941
HMS Sardonyx	Royal Navy	Admiralty S-class destroyer	29 Jan 1941	30 Jan 1941
HMS Scimitar	Royal Navy	Admiralty S-class destroyer	29 Jan 1941	30 Jan 1941

== Bibliography ==
- Hague, Arnold (2000). The Allied Convoy System 1939–1945. ISBN 1-86176-147-3.
- Rohwer, J.; Hummelchen, G. (1992). Chronology of the War at Sea 1939–1945. Naval Institute Press. ISBN 1-55750-105-X.
