= Italian submarine Luigi Torelli =

Marconi-class submarine of the Italian navy

History

Italy
- Name: Luigi Torelli
- Namesake: Luigi Torelli
- Builder: Oto (La Spezia, Italy)
- Laid down: 15 February 1939
- Launched: 6 January 1940
- Commissioned: 15 May 1940
- Home port: BETASOM, Bordeaux
- Fate: Seized by the Japanese on 8 September 1943 and handed over to Nazi Germany on 10 September 1943

Service record as Luigi Torelli
- Commanders: C.F. Aldo Cocchia; C.F. Primo Longobardo; T.V. Antonio De Giacomo; T.V. Augusto Migliorini; T.V. Enrico Gropalli
- Victories: 7 merchant ships sunk (42,968 GRT)

Nazi Germany
- Name: UIT-25
- Acquired: 10 September 1943
- Commissioned: 6 December 1943
- Fate: Incorporated into the Japanese Navy following the German surrender on 10 May 1945

Service record as UIT-25
- Part of: 12th U-boat Flotilla; December 1943 – September 1944; 33rd U-boat Flotilla; October 1944 – May 1945
- Identification codes: M 32 441
- Commanders: Oblt.z.S. Werner Striegler; 6 December 1943 – 13 February 1944; 16 February – 31 August 1944; Oblt.z.S. / Kptlt. Herbert Schrein (acting); September 1944 – February 1945; Oblt.z.S. Alfred Meier; 25 November 1944 – February 1945
- Operations: 3 patrols
- Victories: None

Japan
- Name: I-504
- Acquired: 10 May 1945
- Commissioned: 14 July 1945
- Fate: Captured by the U.S. Navy and scuttled on 16 April 1946

Service record as I-504
- Commanders: Kaigun-tai-i Shuzo Hirota (Note: Serve as commander of I-504 concurrently); 14 July – 30 October 1945; Kaigun-tai-i Chiaki Tanaka; 30 October – 1 December 1945
- Operations: None
- Victories: None

General characteristics
- Class & type: Marconi-class submarine
- Displacement: 1,195 tons (standard); 1,400t (full load)
- Length: 251 ft (77 m)
- Beam: 22.4 ft (6.8 m)
- Draught: 15.6 ft (4.8 m)
- Propulsion: (surfaced/submerged) diesel / electric, 2 shafts; 2,700 / 1,100 kW (3,600 / 1,500 hp)
- Speed: 33.0 / 15.2 km/h (17.8 / 8.2 kn) (surfaced/submerged)
- Complement: 57
- Armament: 1 × 100 mm (4 in) gun; 4 × 13.2 mm (0.52 in) anti-aircraft; 8 × 533 mm (21") torpedo tubes (4 bow, 4 stern); 12 torpedoes

Italian submarine Luigi Torelli was a Marconi-class submarine of the Italian navy during World War II. The vessel operated in the Atlantic from September 1940 until mid-1943, then was sent to the Far East. After Italy's surrender in 1943, the Luigi Torelli was taken over by Nazi Germany's Kriegsmarine, then, in the waning months of the war, the Japanese Imperial Navy. It was one of only two ships to serve in all three major Axis navies. The other, also an Italian submarine and a sister submarine of Luigi Torelli, was Comandante Cappellini.

== Construction ==
Luigi Torelli was built at the Oto shipyard in La Spezia, Italy. One of six boats of the Marconi-class submarine, which were laid down on 15 February 1939, Luigi Torelli was launched on 6 January 1940. Designed as an ocean-going vessel, she was intended for operations both in the Mediterranean and in the Atlantic.

== Service history ==
When Italy entered World War II in June 1940 the Luigi Torelli was still completing its training and shakedown period. Afterward, it conducted a short reconnaissance mission in the Gulf of Genoa, and was then dispatched to the Atlantic to Bordeaux in occupied France to serve in the Italian submarine flotilla there.

Between 11 and 29 September 1940, the Luigi Torelli was assigned to patrol an area just off the Azores Islands. On 5 October 1940, she reached Bordeaux. In the following weeks, the boat left port several times and made short practice missions.

On 15 January 1941 Luigi Torelli, under the command of Primo Longobardo, sighted a small convoy and sank the Greek vessel Nemea, the Norwegian vessel Brask and the Greek vessel Nicolas Filinis. A fourth vessel was also damaged, but escaped due to the foul weather. This was one of the few examples of an Italian submarine achieving great results while participating in a Wolfpack attack, according to Regia Marina Italiana. Two weeks later, the Luigi Torelli sank the British vessel Urla. In July 1941, she sank the Norwegian tanker Ida Knudsen. A year later, she sank the British vessel Scottish Star and the Panamanian motor tanker Esso Copenhagen.

The Torelli was the first submarine to be attacked by an Allied Vickers Wellington using the Leigh light, on the night of 3 June 1942 at roughly 70 miles (110 km) off the Spanish coast, suffering considerable damage but managing to reach the port of Avilés and, after an attempt to reach Bordeaux ended when an Australian Short Sunderland attacked the submarine and inflicted further damage upon it, it ended up in Santander; after emergency repairs, the submarine managed to exit the port (where the Spanish authorities intended to intern it) with a stratagem, and safely reached Bordeaux on July 15.

In 1943, the Luigi Torelli, after surviving at least two serious air attacks, was one of seven Italian submarines designated to be converted into transports. The Italian boats, due to their dimensions, were deemed better suited for long voyages to the Far East on missions to acquire precious and rare material. The Luigi Torelli left for the Far East on 14 June 1943. The operation was under German control but the Luigi Torelli retained its Italian crew.

The Luigi Torelli was one of three Italian submarines in the Far East in 1943 when the new Italian government agreed to an armistice with the Allies. Of the three, the Luigi Torelli, Comandante Cappellini and Giuliani and their crews were temporarily interned by the Japanese. The Luigi Torelli and two other boats then passed to German U-boat command and, with mixed German and Italian crews, continued to fight against the Allies. The Kriegsmarine assigned new officers to the Luigi Torelli, renamed her the UIT-25 and had her take part in German war operations in the Pacific.

Following the German surrender in 1945, the Luigi Torelli was again given a new name, the I-504, by the Japanese, and operated with the Imperial Japanese Navy until 30 August 1945. The Luigi Torelli and sister submarine Comandante Cappellini were the only two ships to fly the flags of all three main Axis powers during World War II.

As the I-504, Luigi Torelli's crew claimed to have shot down a B-25 Mitchell bomber while under the Japanese flag near the very end of the war in the Pacific, allegedly the last success by an Axis naval vessel in the conflict.

== Fate ==
Captured by the U.S. in Kobe, Japan, at the conclusion of the war, the Luigi Torelli was scuttled by the US Navy in the Kii Strait on 16 April 1946.

== Summary of raiding history ==
Ships sunk by Luigi Torelli
Patrol	Date	Ship	Flag	Tonnage	Notes
3rd	15 January 1941	Nemea	Greece	5,198	Freighter; 14 survivors from a crew of 31
3rd	15 January 1941	Brask	Norway	4,079	Freighter; 20 survivors from a crew of 32
3rd	16 January 1941	Nicolas Filinis	Greece	3,111	Freighter; 26 survivors from a crew of 29
3rd	28 January 1941	Urla	United Kingdom	5,198	Freighter; no casualties
5th	21 July 1941	Ida Knudsen	Norway	8,913	Tanker; 5 killed
8th	19 February 1942	Scottish Star	United Kingdom	7,224	Freighter; 4 killed from a crew of 73
8th	25 February 1942	Esso Copenhagen	Panama	9,245	Tanker; 1 killed from a crew of 39
Total:				42,968	
