= Italian submarine Comandante Cappellini =

World War II Italian Marcello-class submarine

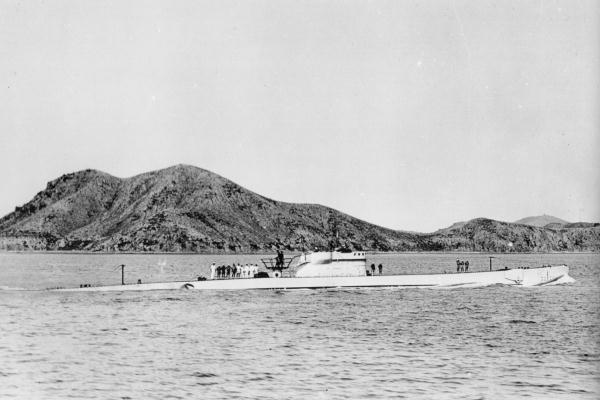
- Italian submarine Comandante Cappellini in the Inland Sea, Japan in August 1944.

History

Italy
- Name: Comandante Cappellini
- Laid down: 25 April 1938
- Launched: 14 May 1939
- Commissioned: 23 September 1939
- Renamed: Aquilla III in May 1943
- Fate: Captured by Japan on 10 September 1943 and handed over to Germany

Service record as Comandante Cappellini
- Commanders: C.C. Cristiano Masi; C.C. Salvatore Todaro; T.V. Aldo Lenzi; T.V. Marco Revedin; C.C. Walter Auconi
- Victories: 5 merchant ships sunk (31,648 GRT)

Nazi Germany
- Name: UIT-24
- Acquired: 10 September 1943
- Commissioned: 6 December 1943
- Fate: Incorporated into Japanese Navy after German surrender on 10 May 1945
- Notes: Mixed Italian / German crew

Service record as UIT-24
- Part of: 12th U-boat Flotilla; December 1943 – September 1944; 33rd U-boat Flotilla; October 1944 – May 1945
- Identification codes: M 31 365
- Commanders: Oblt.z.S. Heinrich Pahls; 6 December 1943 – 8 May 1945
- Operations: 6 patrols
- Victories: None

Japan
- Name: I-503
- Acquired: 10 May 1945
- Commissioned: 14 July 1945
- Fate: Captured by the U.S. Navy in August 1945 and scuttled on 16 April 1946
- Notes: Mixed Italian / German / Japanese crew

Service record as I-503
- Commanders: Kaigun-tai-i Shuzo Hirota (Note: Served as commander of I-504 concurrently); 14 July – 30 October 1945; Kaigun-tai-i Chiaki Tanaka; 30 October – 1 December 1945
- Operations: None
- Victories: None

General characteristics
- Class & type: Marcello-class submarine
- Displacement: 1,060 long tons (1,077 t) surfaced; 1,313 long tons (1,334 t) submerged
- Length: 73 m (239 ft 6 in)
- Beam: 7.19 m (23 ft 7 in)
- Draught: 5.1 m (16 ft 9 in)
- Propulsion: Diesel-electric; 2 × Fiat diesel engines; 2 × CRDA electric motors
- Speed: 17.4 knots (32.2 km/h; 20.0 mph) surfaced; 8 knots (15 km/h; 9.2 mph) submerged
- Complement: 58
- Armament: 8 × 21 in (533 mm) torpedo tubes (4 bow, 4 stern); 2 × 100 mm (4 in)/47 caliber guns; 4 × 13.2 mm (0.52 in) machine guns

Italian submarine Comandante Cappellini was a World War II Italian Marcello-class submarine built for the Italian Royal Navy (Italian: Regia Marina). After Italy's surrender, the submarine was captured by the Japanese and handed over to Germany as UIT-24. Following the capitulation of Germany, the Japanese integrated the boat into their fleet as I-503 (Japanese: 伊号第五百三潜水艦).

The Comandante Cappellini and sister submarine Luigi Torelli were the only two ships to fly the flags of all three main Axis powers during World War II.

== Service history ==
Operating under the command of Capitano di corvetta Cristiano Masi, later Capitano di corvetta Salvatore Todaro, then of Tenente di vascello Aldo Lenzi, later of Tenente di vascello Marco Revedin and Capitano di corvetta Walter Auconi, Comandante Cappellini carried out several war patrols in the Atlantic Ocean while based in BETASOM, sinking 31,648 gross registered ton of enemy shipping. She participated in the rescue of the survivors of the Laconia in September 1942. It was later converted to the transport of strategic materials to and from Japan. After Italy's capitulation in 1943, the submarine was captured by the Imperial Japanese Navy and handed over to Germany at Sabang on 10 September 1943. Commissioned into the Kriegsmarine as foreign U-boat UIT-24 and assigned to 12th U-boat Flotilla with a mixed Italian and German crew. She remained in the Pacific because of failed attempts to return to the 12th Flotilla base at Bordeaux in occupied France.

At Germany's surrender in May 1945, the submarine was taken over and commissioned into the Imperial Japanese Navy as I-503 (her crew now a mixture of Italians, Germans, and Japanese) and shuttled between ports as a transport submarine. At Japan's surrender in August 1945, she was seized by the United States Navy, which scuttled her off Kobe on 16 April 1946.

== In fiction ==
Cappellini is mentioned (and seen briefly in some scenes) in the 2011 TV movie The Sinking of the Laconia. The Capellini and her crew are the main subject of a Japanese two hour TV 2022 special Sensuikan Cappellini-go no Boken (The adventure of the Submarine Cappellini). The vessel plays a central part in the 2023 Italian war film Comandante.

== Summary of raiding history ==
Ships sunk by Comandante Cappellini
Date	Ship Name	Nationality	Tonnage (GRT)	Fate
15 October 1940	Kabalo	Belgium	5,186	Sunk
5 January 1941	Shakespeare	United Kingdom	5,029	Sunk
14 January 1941	Eumaeus	United Kingdom	7,472	Sunk
18 May 1942	Tisnaren	Sweden	5,747	Sunk
31 May 1942	RFA Dinsdale	United Kingdom	8,214	Sunk
Total:			31,648	

== See also ==
- Italian submarines of World War II

== Bibliography ==
- Busch, Rainer; Röll, Hans-Joachim (1999). German U-boat commanders of World War II : a biographical dictionary. Translated by Brooks, Geoffrey. London, Annapolis, Md: Greenhill Books, Naval Institute Press. ISBN 1-55750-186-6.
- Gröner, Erich; Jung, Dieter; Maass, Martin (1991). German Warships 1815–1945, U-boats and Mine Warfare Vessels. Vol. 2. Translated by Thomas, Keith; Magowan, Rachel. London: Conway Maritime Press. ISBN 0-85177-593-4.
- Bagnasco, Erminio (1977). Submarines of World War Two. London: Cassell & Co. ISBN 1-85409-532-3.
- Léonce Peillard, 長塚隆二(Translation), Submarine war 1939-1945 (潜水艦戦争 1939–1945), Hayakawa Publishing, 1979 (Japanese)
