= List of shipwrecks in July 1941 =

The list of shipwrecks in July 1941 includes all ships sunk, foundered, grounded, or otherwise lost during July 1941.

== 1 July ==
List of shipwrecks: 1 July 1941
Ship	State	Description
Adjutant	Kriegsmarine	World War II: The auxiliary minelayer (354 GRT), formerly the Norwegian whate catcher Pol IX before being captured by Pinguin (Kriegsmarine) was scuttled by Komet (Kriegsmarine) off the Chatham Islands after engine trouble. There were no casualty.
Bystryi	Soviet Navy	World War II: The Gnevny-class destroyer on her trip from Sevastopol for Nikolaev struck a German aerial mine in Sevastopol Bay and subsequently sank in shallow water. 24 of her crew were killed and 81 wounded in the explosion. The destroyer was raised on 13 July, but was never repaired.
HMT Devon County	Royal Navy	World War II: The naval trawler struck a mine and sank in the Thames Estuary (51°28′51″N 0°59′14″E) with the loss of three of her crew.
Homefire	United Kingdom	World War II: The cargo ship was bombed and sunk in the North Sea (53°05′30″N 1°28′00″E) by Luftwaffe aircraft with the loss of two of her crew.
Imanta	Soviet Navy	The requisitioned 1,233 GRT cargo ship (VT-555) on a trip for Tallinn, ran aground on rocks off Kurgalsky Peninsula, and was wrecked (59°52′N 28°04′E).
Jesus Antonio	Spain	World War II: The cargo ship (1,235 GRT) struck a mine and sank in the Mediterranean Sea off Imperia, Italy with the loss of 17 crew. There were 3 survivors.
M-81	Soviet Navy	World War II: The M-class submarine struck a mine and sank on the Laine Bank, in the Baltic Sea off Vormsi, Estonia (59°09′N 22°58′E).
M 3134	Kriegsmarine	World War II: The naval drifter/auxiliary minesweeper was sunk off Liepāja, Latvia, by a mine laid by T-204 Fugas (Soviet Navy). There were nine dead and five survivors.
HMS Malvernian	Royal Navy	World War II: The armed boarding vessel was bombed and damaged in the Atlantic Ocean (47°37′N 19°07′W) by Luftwaffe aircraft with the loss of 24 of her 164 crew. The ship was abandoned, but remained afloat until 19 July when she was scuttled 90 nautical miles (170 km; 100 mi) off the Cabo Prior Lighthouse, Spain. Survivors were rescued by HMS Scarborough (Royal Navy), Kriegsmarine minesweepers, or reached the Spanish coast in lifeboats.
HNoMS MTB 5	Royal Norwegian Navy	The motor torpedo boat was wrecked by an accidental engine room explosion in the United Kingdom. Four of her crew were killed.
Strathgairn	United Kingdom	World War II: The 115.6-foot (35.2 m), 211-ton fishing trawler struck a mine and sank on 1 or 14 July, depending on sources, in the Atlantic Ocean 20 nautical miles (37 km) south west of Barra Head, Outer Hebrides with the loss of five of her eleven crew.
T-299 Imanta	Soviet Navy	World War II: The minesweeper struck a mine, laid by S-44 and S-104 (both Kriegsmarine) in the west entrance of Soela Strait, and subsequently sank (58°41′N 22°22′E).
Toronto City	United Kingdom	World War II: The 2,486 GRT weather ship was torpedoed and sunk in the Atlantic Ocean (47°03′N 30°00′W) by U-108 (Kriegsmarine) with the loss of all 43 crew.

== 2 July ==
List of shipwrecks: 2 July 1941
Ship	State	Description
Città di Tripoli	Italy	World War II: The cargo ship (2,933 GRT) on a passage from Samos for Piraeus, was torpedoed and sunk in the Mediterranean Sea in Kea Channel (37°41′50″N 24°15′50″E) by HMS Torbay (Royal Navy). 11 crew were lost. The 48 survivors were rescued by Citta di Savona (Italy).

== 3 July ==
List of shipwrecks: 3 July 1941
Ship	State	Description
Everiga	Soviet Union	World War II: The 4,648 GRT cargo ship was sunk as blockship at Pärnu by Soviet torpedo boats. Later raised by Germans, towed to Copenhagen for repairs, but never finished. Returned to the USSR after the war.
Felipe Crespi	Spain	World War II: The cargo ship (297 GRT) struck a mine and sank in the Mediterranean Sea off Genoa, Italy. Seven crew were killed.
Johanna Hendrika	Netherlands	World War II: The fishing boat struck a mine and sank off Katwijk aan Zee with the loss of all four hands.
KOL 72	Kriegsmarine	World War II: The naval trawler struck a mine and sank at Kołobrzeg, Poland.
Laura C.	Italy	World War II: The 6,181 GRT cargo ship on a passage from Taranto for Naples was torpedoed and heavily damaged in the Mediterranean Sea off Saline Joniche, Calabria (37°55′N 15°44′E) by HMS Upholder (Royal Navy) with the loss of six of her 38 crew. The ship was towed and beached at the mouth of Molaro River, but due to sustained damage she shortly sank.
HMT Receptive	Royal Navy	World War II: The 86 GRT converted minesweeper struck a mine and sank in the Thames Estuary 2.5 nautical miles (4.6 km) north of Sheppey (51°20′50″N 0°54′35″E) with the loss of nine of her crew.
Robert L. Holt	United Kingdom	World War II: The cargo ship (2,918 GRT), on a passage from Liverpool for Warri in ballast, was shelled and sunk in the Atlantic Ocean (24°15′N 20°00′W) by U-69 (Kriegsmarine) with the loss of all 56 crew, including Vice-Admiral Norman Wodehouse.
HMT Rosme	Royal Navy	World War II: The 82 GRT auxiliary sailing barge struck a mine and sank in Barrow Deep (51°34′12″N 1°03′00″E). The crew was rescued and landed at Harwich.
TK-12	Soviet Navy	World War II: The G-5-class motor torpedo boat struck a mine and sank off Balaklava with a loss of entire crew.
Vyborg	Soviet Union	World War II: The cargo ship (3,183 GRT) on a passage from Leningrad for Tallinn was torpedoed and sunk in the Baltic Sea (60°08′N 27°32′E) by Vesikko (Finnish Navy) with the loss of a crew member.

== 4 July ==
List of shipwrecks: 4 July 1941
Ship	State	Description
HMT Akranes	Royal Navy	World War II: The 358 GRT requisitioned naval trawler was bombed and sunk in the North Sea off Bridlington, Yorkshire by Luftwaffe aircraft.
Auditor	United Kingdom	World War II: The 5,444 GRT cargo ship on a trip from London for Capetown and Beira with general cargo and aircraft, was torpedoed and sunk in the Atlantic Ocean (25°33′N 28°23′W) by U-123 (Kriegsmarine) with the loss of one of her 76 crew. Survivors reached the Azores and Cape Verde Islands, Portugal in their lifeboats.
Balfron	United Kingdom	World War II: The 362 GRT coaster on passage from Southend on Sea to Grangemouth was bombed and sunk in the North Sea 3.5 nautical miles (6.5 km; 4.0 mi) off Ravenscar, Yorkshire with the loss of four of her crew.
Lunan	United Kingdom	World War II: The 363 GRT coaster on a trip from Ely Harbour for Portishead with a cargo of coal, struck a mine and sank in River Ely (51°26′48″N 3°10′24″W) with the loss of five of her six crew.
St. Didier	Vichy France	World War II: The auxiliary cruiser was sunk off Adalia, Turkey by Fairey Albacore aircraft of the Royal Air Force whilst attempting to pass herself off as a Turkish merchant ship.

== 5 July ==
List of shipwrecks: 5 July 1941
Ship	State	Description
Advance	Norway	World War II: The coaster was bombed and sunk off Vågsøy by aircraft.
Anselm	United Kingdom	World War II: The troopship was torpedoed and sunk in the Atlantic Ocean (44°25′N 28°35′W) by U-96 (Kriegsmarine) with the loss of 254 of the 1,316 people aboard. Survivors were rescued by HMS Challenger and HMS Starwort (both Royal Navy).
Bencruachan	United Kingdom	World War II: The 5,920 GRT cargo ship on a trip from Barry for Alexandria with general cargo, struck a mine and sank in the Mediterranean Sea off the Mex High Lighthouse, Alexandria with the loss of three of her 51 crew. The wreck was scrapped in 1950–1951.
Dante de Lutti	Regia Marina	World War II: The naval trawler (266 GRT) was shelled and sunk in the Mediterranean Sea off Ras Tajunes, Libya by HMS Triumph (Royal Navy). One crew was killed and 4 wounded.
Fowey Rose	United Kingdom	World War II: The coaster was bombed and sunk in the Atlantic Ocean (51°51′N 5°28′W) by Luftwaffe aircraft.
Jantina	Regia Marina	World War II: The submarine (650 GRT) was torpedoed and sunk in the Aegean Sea off Milos, Greece (37°39′N 25°00′E) by HMS Torbay (Royal Navy). There were 41 dead and six survivors. The wreck was discovered in November 2021.
Michele Bianchi	Regia Marina	World War II: The Marconi-class submarine was torpedoed and sunk in the Bay of Biscay (45°03′N 4°01′W) by Tigris (Royal Navy) with the loss of all 61 crew.
Ninfea	Italy	World War II: The cargo ship (607 GRT) was sunk by gunfire by HMS Triumph (Royal Navy) in the Mediterranean Sea off Ras Tajunes, Libya. There were no casualties.
Rasma	Soviet Union	World War II: The 3,204 GRT cargo ship on a voyage from Tallinn for Leningrad with a cargo of grain and flour, struck a mine and was damaged in the Baltic Sea. She was beached on Mohni, with her crew and passengers successfully disembarking. She was bombed on 10 July by Luftwaffe aircraft and torpedoed by S-26 and S-28 (both Kriegsmarine), destroying her wreck.
HMS Snaefell	Royal Navy	World War II: The auxiliary paddle minesweeper was bombed and sunk in the North Sea eight miles (13 km) off Sunderland, County Durham (54°03′N 1°20′W) by Luftwaffe aircraft with the loss of three of her crew.
Stig Gorthon	Sweden	World War II: The cargo ship struck a mine and sank in the North Sea off Borkum, Lower Saxony, Germany. Her 25 crew were rescued.
Wyreema	United Kingdom	World War II: The motor yacht was lost on board Bencruachan (United Kingdom) when the latter ship was sunk.

== 6 July ==
List of shipwrecks: 6 July 1941
Ship	State	Description
T-216	Soviet Navy	The Fugas-class minesweeper struck a mine and sank off Tahkuna Lighthouse as she was guiding Soviet submarines M-103 and M-97.
Unnamed fishing vessel	Soviet Union	World War II: The sail fishing vessel was sunk with depth charges by Syosky, Vinha, and Raju (all Finnish Navy).
Westfield	United Kingdom	World War II: The fishing trawler was bombed and sunk in the Bristol Channel off Lundy Island, Devon by Luftwaffe aircraft. All ten crew were lost.

== 7 July ==
List of shipwrecks: 7 July 1941
Ship	State	Description
Gustav Eugene	France	World War II: The fishing trawler was sunk in the Bay of Biscay off Ouessant, Finistère by HMS Sealion (Royal Navy).
Gustav Jeanne	France	World War II: The fishing trawler was sunk in the Bay of Biscay off Ouessant by HMS Sealion (Royal Navy).
HMT Lord St. Vincent	Royal Navy	World War II: The 92-foot (28 m), 115-ton contraband control naval trawler struck a mine and sank in the Thames Estuary off North East Gunfleet Buoy, Burnham-on-Crouch, Essex with the loss of one or two of her crew.
Luise Bergmann	Germany	World War II: The schooner struck a mine and sank in the Baltic Sea off Kolberg.
Neuenfelde	Germany	World War II: The cargo ship struck a mine and sank in the Baltic Sea off Kolberg.
TShch-101 Petrozavodsk	Soviet Navy	The 180 GRT auxiliary minesweeper struck an acoustic mine and sank off Tolbukhin Lighthouse, Kronstadt. Raised in the Fall 1941, repaired and returned to service in November 1941 as TShch-39

== 8 July ==
List of shipwrecks: 8 July 1941
Ship	State	Description
Christus Regnat	France	World War II: The fishing trawler was sunk in the Bay of Biscay off Ouessant, Finistère by HMS Sealion (Royal Navy).
LI	Germany	World War II: The steamship was shelled and sunk in the Mediterranean Sea east of Kithera, Greece by HMS Torbay (Royal Navy).
LXIV	Germany	World War II: The steamship was shelled and sunk in the Mediterranean Sea east of Kithera by HMS Torbay (Royal Navy).
M-1104 Jan Hubert	Kriegsmarine	The minesweeper was lost in a collision off Sogne, Norway at 58°25′N 7°55′E.
No. 102	Soviet Navy	The Project 1125-class gunboat was sunk on this date.
RTShch-103	Soviet Navy	The K-15/M-17-class river minesweeping launch was sunk on this date.
RTShch-106	Soviet Navy	The K-15/M-17-class river minesweeping launch was sunk on this date.
St Pierre d'Alacantra	France	World War II: The fishing trawler was sunk in the Bay of Biscay off Ouessant by HMS Sealion (Royal Navy).

== 9 July ==
List of shipwrecks: 9 July 1941
Ship	State	Description
Blue Mermaid	United Kingdom	World War II: The 97 GRT sailing barge struck a mine and sank in the North Sea off Clacton-on-Sea, Essex (51°39′01″N 1°08′05″E) with the loss of two of her crew.
Designer	United Kingdom	World War II: The cargo ship was torpedoed and sunk in the Atlantic Ocean (42°59′N 31°40′W) by U-98 (Kriegsmarine) with the loss of 67 of her 78 crew. Survivors were rescued by Souta Princesca (Portugal).
Hansestadt Danzig	Kriegsmarine	World War II: The minelayer struck a mine and sank in the Baltic Sea east of Öland, Sweden.
Inverness	United Kingdom	World War II: The cargo ship was torpedoed and sunk in the Atlantic Ocean (42°46′N 32°45′W) by U-98 (Kriegsmarine) with the loss of six of her 43 crew. Survivors reached the Azores, Portugal in their lifeboats.
L 12	Germany	World War II: The ship was shelled and sunk in the Mediterranean Sea east of Kithera by HMS Torbay (Royal Navy).
LV	Germany	World War II: The ship was shelled and sunk in the Mediterranean Sea east of Kithera, Greece by HMS Torbay (Royal Navy).
LVI	Germany	World War II: The ship was shelled and sunk in the Mediterranean Sea east of Kithera by HMS Torbay (Royal Navy).
Preußen	Kriegsmarine	World War II: The minelayer struck a mine and sank in the Baltic Sea east of Öland.
Shch-206	Soviet Navy	World War II: Action of 9 July 1941: The Shchuka-class submarine was shelled, depth charged and sunk by torpedo boat Năluca, gunboat Stihi Eugen, and motor torpedo boats Viscolul, Viforul and Vijelia (all Royal Romanian Navy) about 8 nautical miles (15 km) east of Mangalia (43°51.5′N 28°45′E).
T-890	Soviet Navy	World War II: The converted 613 GRT minesweeper was sunk in Litsa Fjord by Junkers Ju 88 bombers, while supporting a landing operation. Thirteen of her crew died.
Tannenberg	Kriegsmarine	World War II: The minelayer struck a mine and sank in the Baltic Sea east of Öland.

== 10 July ==
List of shipwrecks: 10 July 1941
Ship	State	Description
Celano	Royal Navy	World War II: The tender to HMS Tedworth (Royal Navy) struck a mine and sank with the loss of all six of her crew.
Hermes	Germany	World War II: The cargo ship was intercepted by HMS Canton (Royal Navy) 300 nautical miles (560 km; 350 mi) off the Saint Peter and Saint Paul Archipelago, Brazil and was scuttled by her crew, who were taken as prisoners of war.
Isabella Fowlie	United Kingdom	World War II: The fishing trawler was bombed and sunk in the North Sea 7 nautical miles (13 km) north east of the Longstone Lighthouse by Luftwaffe aircraft.
M-23	Kriegsmarine	World War II: The minesweeper was mined, damaged, and beached in the Irben Strait. She was raised, repaired, and returned to service. (Look 11/07/1941)
M-205	Kriegsmarine	World War II: The minesweeper was mined and sunk in the Irben Strait. She was later raised, repaired and returned to service.
Svint	Norway	World War II: The cargo ship was bombed and sunk in the Atlantic Ocean seven nautical miles (13 km; 8.1 mi) north west of Trevose Head, Cornwall, United Kingdom (50°38′26″N 4°57′12″W) by Luftwaffe aircraft with the loss of one of her 21 crew.
UJ 113 Nordmark	Kriegsmarine	World War II: The auxiliary submarine chaser was sunk off Liepāja, Latvia by a mine laid by T-204 Fugas (Soviet Navy).

== 11 July ==
List of shipwrecks: 11 July 1941
Ship	State	Description
BKA-111	Soviet Navy	World War II: The gunboat was shelled and sunk by Romanian forces in the Chilia branch of the Danube.
BKA-134	Soviet Navy	World War II: The gunboat was shelled and sunk by Romanian forces in the Chilia branch of the Danube.
HMS Defender	Royal Navy	World War II: The D-class destroyer was bombed and damaged off Sidi Barrani, Egypt by a Junkers Ju 88 aircraft of Lehrgeschwader 1, Luftwaffe. She was subsequently scuttled by HMAS Vendetta (Royal Australian Navy).
Kai	Germany	World War II: The cargo ship struck a mine and sank. She was on a voyage from Rotterdam, South Holland, Netherlands to Aarhus, Denmark.
M-23	Kriegsmarine	World War II: The Type 1935 minesweeper was mined and sunk off "Parnava". She was raised, repaired, returned to service.
No. 103	Soviet Navy	The Project 1125-class gunboat was sunk on this date.
No. 501	Soviet Navy	The Project 1125-class gunboat was sunk on this date.
Suzette	United Kingdom	The trawler was wrecked in heavy weather and fog on Girdle Reef, Peterhead.

== 12 July ==
List of shipwrecks: 12 July 1941
Ship	State	Description
Patrai	Greece	World War II: The cargo ship was bombed and sunk at Port Said, Egypt, by Luftwaffe aircraft. She was raised post-war, repaired and returned to service.
Sparta	Germany	World War II: The cargo ship was bombed and sunk at Tripoli, Libya. She was later salvaged, repaired and put into service as a Sperrbrecher.

== 13 July ==
List of shipwrecks: 13 July 1941
Ship	State	Description
Caldea	Italy	World War II: The cargo ship (2,703 GRT) was torpedoed and sunk in the Mediterranean Sea 10 nautical miles (19 km) north west of Benghazi, Libya by HMS Taku (Royal Navy) with the loss of 2 or 3 lives.
Collingdoc	United Kingdom	World War II: The cargo ship struck a mine and sank in the Thames Estuary off Southend, Essex. She was refloated on 21 July, requisitioned by the Admiralty and scuttled as a blockship at Scapa Flow on 28 March 1942.
Deutschland	Kriegsmarine	World War II: The landing ship was bombed and sunk in the Gulf of Riga by Ilyushin DB-3 aircraft of the Soviet Air Force.
Hannington Court	United Kingdom	The cargo ship caught fire in the Indian Ocean. She was shelled and sunk on 19 July by HMS Dragon (Royal Navy) as she was a danger to navigation (34°46′05″S 19°23′07″E).
Musher	United States	The fishing vessel was destroyed by fire in Sitka Sound, Alaska Territory. Both people on board survived.
Pegasus	Vichy France	World War II: The tankerstruck a mine and sank at Beirut, Lebanon, or was attacked by British aircraft and sunk.
RT-32 Kumzha	Soviet Navy	World War II: The 207 GRT converted fishing trawler, towing a underwater fuel tank from Murmansk to a newly organized base at Yokanga, was shelled and damaged by Hermann Schoemann (Kriegsmarine), and was subsequently beached in Gavrilovsky Bay with a loss of 7 of her crew. She was raised in 1943, but never repaired.
RT-67 Molotov	Soviet Navy	World War II: The 557 GRT converted fishing trawler, towing a underwater fuel tank from Murmansk to a newly organized base at Yokanga, was shelled and sunk off Gavrilovsky Islands by Hans Lody, Karl Galster and Hermann Schoemann (all Kriegsmarine) with a loss of 24 people.
Scorton	United Kingdom	World War II: The cargo ship was bombed and damaged by Luftwaffe aircraft off the Smith's Knoll, in the North Sea off the north Norfolk coast. She was subsequently repaired and returned to service.
SKR-22 Passat	Soviet Navy	World War II: The 1,062 GRT converted fishing trawler, guarding a small convoy of RT-32 Kumzha and RT-67 Molotov ships, was shelled and sunk off Gavrilovski Islands (69°35′N 35°57′E) by Hans Lody, Karl Galster and Hermann Schoemann (all Kriegsmarine). with a loss of 39 of her 41 crew.

== 14 July ==
List of shipwrecks: 14 July 1941
Ship	State	Description
Aspen	Sweden	World War II: The cargo ship was bombed and sunk in the North Sea 45 nautical miles (83 km) off Rotterdam, South Holland, Netherlands by Luftwaffe aircraft with the loss of two of her crew.
Brodwal	Vichy France	World War II: The damaged 3,385 GRT cargo ship anchored outside of Beirut harbor, was torpedoed and sunk by British aircraft.
Georgic	United Kingdom	Georgic World War II: The troopship was bombed and damaged in the Gulf of Suez by Luftwaffe aircraft with the loss of 26 lives. Georgic was beached, and was salvaged in November. She was later repaired, and returned to service in 1945.
Lesbian	Vichy France	World War II: The cargo ship was scuttled at Beirut.
Nikoklis	Greece	World War II: The cargo ship was torpedoed and sunk in the Atlantic Ocean 105 nautical miles (194 km) south west of the Azores, Portugal by Alessandro Malaspina (Regia Marina) with the loss of seventeen of her 28 crew.
Rupert de Larrinaga	United Kingdom	World War II: The cargo ship was torpedoed and sunk in the Atlantic Ocean (36°18′N 21°11′W) by Morosini (Regia Marina). Her 44 crew were rescued by Campeche (Spain).
Sir John Baldwin	Romania	World War II: The dredger was bombed and sunk in the Danube by Soviet Air Force aircraft.

== 15 July ==
List of shipwrecks: 15 July 1941
Ship	State	Description
A 10	Royal Navy	World War II: The lighter was bombed and sunk in the Mediterranean Sea (32°15′N 25°26′E) by Luftwaffe aircraft with the loss of a crew member.
NMS Aurora	Royal Romanian Navy	World War II: Operation München: The minelayer, previously damaged during 28 June raid, was bombed and sunk in Sfântu Gheorghe branch near Domnița Maria by 11 SB-2 bombers of 40th SBAP. She was later raised, repaired and returned to service as a tug.
Barbarigo	Italy	World War II: The cargo ship (5,293 GRT) was torpedoed and sunk in the Mediterranean Sea eight nautical miles (15 km; 9.2 mi) south of Pantelleria (36°27′N 11°45′E) by HMS P33 (Royal Navy). Her whole crew was saved by Pegaso (Regia Marina).
Farfield	United Kingdom	World War II: The coaster was bombed and sunk in the Irish Sea five nautical miles (9.3 km; 5.8 mi) off South Stack, Anglesey by Luftwaffe aircraft with the loss of eight of her nine crew.
Iris	Sweden	The cargo ship (1,974 GRT) collided with RFA Blue Ranger (Royal Fleet Auxiliary) and sank in the Firth of Clyde four nautical miles (7.4 km; 4.6 mi) off Pladda, Buteshire, United Kingdom. Her crew were rescued.
HMS Lady Somers	Royal Navy	World War II: The ocean boarding vessel was torpedoed and sunk in the Atlantic Ocean (37°12′N 20°32′W) by Morosini (Regia Marina). Her 175 crew were rescued by Campeche (Spain).
M-49	Soviet Navy	World War II: The M-class submarine struck a mine and sank off Vladivostok.
M-63	Soviet Navy	World War II: The M-class submarine struck a mine and sank off Vladivostok.
Nettuno	Regia Marina	World War II: The patrol vessel was torpedoed and sunk in the Mediterranean Sea by Taku (Royal Navy).
HMS Prince Philippe	Royal Navy	The landing ship collided with Empire Wave (United Kingdom) off the west coast of Scotland and sank with the loss of a crew member.
Vinnitsa	Soviet Navy	World War II: The Zhitomir-class river monitor was shelled and damaged by German field artillery on the Berezina River and run aground off Parichi. She was scuttled the next day to avoid capture.
Vincenzo Padre	Regia Marina	World War II: The patrol vessel was torpedoed and sunk in the Mediterranean Sea by Taku (Royal Navy).

== 16 July ==
List of shipwrecks: 16 July 1941
Ship	State	Description
HMMGB 90, and HMMGB 92	Royal Navy	The ELCO 70-foot-class motor gun boats were destroyed by fire at Portland Harbour, Dorset.
HMIS Sophie Marie	Royal Indian Navy	The minesweeper/naval trawler ran aground off Cochin. She was refloated the next day.

== 17 July ==
List of shipwrecks: 17 July 1941
Ship	State	Description
HMT Fertile Vale	Royal Navy	The naval trawler collided with another vessel and sank in the Firth of Tay.
Guelma	United Kingdom	World War II: The cargo ship was torpedoed and sunk in the Atlantic Ocean (30°44′N 17°33′W) by Alessandro Malaspina (Regia Marina). Her 41 crew were rescued by HMS Thunderbolt (Royal Navy).
HMS LCT 10	Royal Navy	World War II: The LCT Mk 1-class landing craft tank was bombed and damaged off Sidi Barani, Egypt, by Junkers Ju 87 aircraft of Lehrgeschwader 1, Luftwaffe. She was taken under tow but consequently sank.
Maddalena Odero	Italy	World War II: The cargo ship was torpedoed and severely damaged in the Tyrrhenian Sea by HNLMS O23 (Royal Netherlands Navy). She was bombed and sunk off Lampedusa the next day by British aircraft.
Virgo Fidelis	France	World War II: The fishing trawler was attacked by HMS Thrasher (Royal Navy) in the Bay of Biscay off San Sebastián, Gipuzkoa, Spain and was beached. She was declared a total loss.

== 18 July ==
List of shipwrecks: 18 July 1941
Ship	State	Description
Kola	Soviet Union	World War II: The cargo ship struck a mine and sank in the Black Sea with the loss of three of her 33 crew.
TKА-123	Soviet Navy	World War II: The G-5-class motor torpedo boat was bombed and sunk in Irben Strait by Luftwaffe aircraft.

== 19 July ==
List of shipwrecks: 19 July 1941
Ship	State	Description
Holmside	United Kingdom	World War II: The cargo ship was torpedoed and sunk in the Atlantic Ocean (19°00′N 21°30′W) by U-66 (Kriegsmarine) with the loss of 21 of her 37 crew. Survivors were rescued by Sete Citades (Portugal).
Jean Marie	United States	The fishing vessel was destroyed by fire off Kruzof Island in the Alexander Archipelago, Alaska Territory. The only person aboard survived.
NK-08 Kanonier	Kriegsmarine	World War II: The escort vessel was torpedoed and sunk in the North Sea off Sirevåg, Norway by aircraft of 42 Squadron, Royal Air Force with the loss of thirteen of her 29 crew. Survivors were rescued by Helga Ina (Germany).
No. 403	Soviet Navy	The Project 1125-class gunboat was sunk on this date.
Serdityi	Soviet Navy	World War II: The Soobrazitelny-class destroyer was bombed and damaged in the Suur Strait, Gulf of Finland, by a Junkers Ju 88 aircraft of Küstenfliegergruppe 806, Luftwaffe. Salvage attempts were abandoned on 22 July.
Shtil	Soviet Navy	World War II: The patrol vessel was bombed and sunk in the Arctic Sea by Junkers Ju 87 aircraft of the Luftwaffe.
HMS Umpire	Royal Navy	World War II: Convoy EC 47: The U-class submarine collided with HMT Peter Hendriks (Royal Navy) off The Wash (53°09′N 1°08′E) and sank with the loss of sixteen of her 38 crew.

== 20 July ==
List of shipwrecks: 20 July 1941
Ship	State	Description
Brynje	Norway	World War II: The 3,916 GRT cargo ship on a trip from Rotterdam for Harstad with a cargo of coke, struck a mine and sank in the Skagerrak off Kalundborg, Denmark (55°42′18″N 10°57′20″E). She was salvaged in March 1944 but was declared a total loss.
Empress	United States	The fishing vessel was destroyed by fire at the entrance to Traitors Cove (55°42′N 131°39′W) in the Behm Canal, Alaska Territory.
Stremitenlnyi	Soviet Navy	World War II: The Gnevny-class destroyer (1,631/2,007 t, 1938) was bombed and sunk at Yekatarinskaya Gavan by Junkers Ju 87 of 12 Staffel, Lehrgeschwader 1, Luftwaffe with the loss of 121 of her crew.
HMS Union	Royal Navy	World War II: The U-class submarine was depth charged and sunk in the Mediterranean Sea south south west of Pantelleria, Italy by Circe (Regia Marina) with the loss of all 31 crew.

== 21 July ==
List of shipwrecks: 21 July 1941
Ship	State	Description
Bangalore	United Kingdom	World War II: The cargo ship collided in the Atlantic Ocean (1°30′N 41°54′W) with Richmond Castle (United Kingdom). Bangalore was scuttled at 0°59′N 43°00′W by a Royal Navy ship as she was a danger to navigation. Bangalore was on a voyage from London to Hong Kong.
Hans Christophersen	Germany	World War II: The cargo ship struck a mine and sank in the North Sea off Terschelling, Friesland, Netherlands.
Ida Knudsen	Norway	World War II: The 8,913 GRT tanker on a trip from Port of Spain for Gibraltar with a cargo of fuel oil, was torpedoed and sunk in the Atlantic Ocean (34°34′N 13°14′W) by Luigi Torelli (Regia Marina) with the loss of five of her 38 crew. Fifteen of her survivors were rescued by the fishing trawler Altair (Portugal) and taken to Las Palmas, and the rest managed to reach Agadir on 28 July.
M-94	Soviet Navy	World War II: The M-class submarine was torpedoed and sunk in the Baltic Sea off Hiiumaa, Estonia (58°51′N 22°02′E) by U-140 (Kriegsmarine) with the loss of eight of her nineteen crew. Survivors were rescued by M-98 (Soviet Navy).
Wandsbeck	Germany	World War II: The transport ship was bombed and sunk at Narvik, Norway in a British air raid. She was refloated on 29 March 1943. Subsequently repaired and returned to service.

== 22 July ==
List of shipwrecks: 22 July 1941
Ship	State	Description
Brarena	Italy	World War II: The 6,996 GRT tanker travelling in convoy from Trapani for Tripoli, was bombed and damaged in the Mediterranean Sea about 80 nautical miles (150 km; 92 mi) southeast of Pantelleria by Blenheim Mk.IV bombers of No. 110 Squadron RAF. The ship was taken into tow by Fuciliere and Folgore, but was hit by a torpedo during another aerial attack by two Fairey Swordfish aircraft of 830 Squadron, Fleet Air Arm, forcing the crew to abandon the ship. The tanker continued drifting and burning until she came ashore near Kerkennah in early August.
Lacplesis	Soviet Navy	World War II: The 253 GRT icebreaking tug on a trip from Triigi for Mõntu with a cargo of torpedoes, was shelled and damaged in the Gulf of Riga off Abruka by S-28 and S-29 (both Kriegsmarine). She was towed to Roomassaare, where she sank on 29 July. Later raised by Germans and put back in service.
Preußen	Germany	World War II: The cargo ship was torpedoed and sunk in the Mediterranean Sea 30 nautical miles (56 km; 35 mi) south east of Pantelleria by Fairey Swordfish aircraft of 30 Squadron, Fleet Air Arm with the loss 180 of the 440 people aboard.
TK-71	Soviet Navy	World War II: The G-5-class motor torpedo boat was shelled and sunk in the Gulf of Riga south of Abruka by German S-28 and S-29 (both Kriegsmarine).

== 23 July ==
List of shipwrecks: 23 July 1941
Ship	State	Description
Adamant	United Kingdom	World War II: The sailing barge struck a mine and sank at Hull, Yorkshire. She was later salvaged.
Adzhariya	Soviet Union	World War II: The passenger ship was bombed and sunk in the Black Sea off Odesa by Luftwaffe aircraft with the loss of four of her crew. The wreck was raised and scrapped post-war.
HMS Fearless	Royal Navy	World War II: The F-class destroyer was torpedoed and damaged in the Mediterranean Sea north east of Bône, Algeria by Regia Aeronautica aircraft. Her crew were rescued by HMS Forester (Royal Navy) which then scuttled her at 37°40′N 8°20′E.
M 3131 Betje	Kriegsmarine	World War II: The auxiliary minesweeper, a former Dutch fishing boat (186 GRT), struck a mine and sank in the Gulf of Riga (57°30′N 22°04′E). There were 22 dead and 3 survivors.
Narova	Soviet Navy	The auxiliary river gunboat was sunk on this date.
Omfleet	United Kingdom	World War II: The sailing barge struck a mine and sank at Hull.
Soavita	United Kingdom	World War II: The sailing barge struck a mine and sank at Hull. She was later salvaged.
Tirpitz	Kriegsmarine	World War II: The cargo ship struck a mine and sank off Cape del Arma.
UJ 113 Nordmark	Kriegsmarine	World War II: The submarine chaser struck a mine and sank in the Baltic Sea off Liepāja, Latvia.
V 1310 Lena Rehder	Kriegsmarine	World War II: The vorpostenboot was torpedoed and sunk in the English Channel off Boulogne, Pas-de-Calais, France by a Royal Navy motor torpedo boat.
V 1508 Rau III	Kriegsmarine	World War II: The vorpostenboot was sunk in the English Channel south west of Boulogne.

== 24 July ==
List of shipwrecks: 24 July 1941
Ship	State	Description
Meridian	Soviet Union	World War II: The survey ship was shelled and sunk in the Arctic Sea between Iokanga and Teriberka by Friedrich Eckoldt, Hermann Schoemann, Karl Galster, and Richard Beitzen (all Kriegsmarine). with the loss of 46 of the 63 people on board.
No. 11	Soviet Navy	The KM-2-class motor launch was lost on this date.

== 25 July ==
List of shipwrecks: 25 July 1941
Ship	State	Description
B 247 Maria Immancolata	Regia Marina	World War II: The patrol vessel was torpedoed and sunk in the Mediterranean Sea off Gaidero Island, Greece by HMS Tetrarch (Royal Navy).
Ellinico	Greece	World War II: The cargo ship was torpedoed and sunk in the Atlantic Ocean by U-108 (Kriegsmarine).
Erlangen	Germany	World War II: The cargo ship was intercepted in the South Atlantic off the mouth of the River Plate by HMS Newcastle (Royal Navy) and was scuttled by her crew.
Ikuta Maru	Imperial Japanese Navy	The Ikuta Maru-class gunboat ran aground in the Yokosuka area and was damaged. The vessel was pulled off the same day, and the damage had been repaired by 13 August.
Kazak Poyarkov	Soviet Union	World War II: The 1,035 GRT icebreaker hit a Soviet mine and sank in the Olga Bay with the loss of 30 of her 45 crew.
Macon	United Kingdom	World War II: The cargo liner was torpedoed and sunk in the Atlantic Ocean (32°48′N 26°12′W) by Barbarigo (Regia Marina) with the loss of 28 of the 49 people on board.
No. 98	Soviet Navy	The Project 1124/No 41-class gunboat was lost on this date.

== 26 July ==
List of shipwrecks: 26 July 1941
Ship	State	Description
Atlantic City	United Kingdom	World War II: Convoy OS 1: The cargo ship was torpedoed and damaged in the Atlantic Ocean (55°42′N 9°58′W) by U-141 (Kriegsmarine) and was abandoned by her 41 crew. She was later re-boarded and reached the Clyde under her own power. She was repaired, and returned to service in November 1941.
Botwey	United Kingdom	World War II: Convoy OS 1: The cargo ship was torpedoed and sunk in the Atlantic Ocean 60 nautical miles (110 km; 69 mi) north of Tory Island, County Donegal, Ireland (55°42′N 9°53′W) by U-141 (Kriegsmarine). Her 53 crew were rescued.
Horn Shell	United Kingdom	World War II: The tanker was torpedoed and sunk in the Atlantic Ocean (33°32′N 22°18′W) by Barbarigo (Regia Marina) with the loss of seventeen of her 57 crew. Survivors were rescued by the fishing trawler Maria Leonor (Portugal).
MAS 451	Regia Marina	World War II: The MAS 451-class motor torpedo boat was bombed and sunk off Malta by Royal Air Force aircraft.
MAS 452	Regia Marina	World War II: The MAS 451-class motor torpedo boat was either bombed and sunk, or damaged and captured, off Malta by Royal Air Force aircraft.
Metallist	Soviet Union	World War II: The cargo ship was shelled and sunk at Hanko, Finland by German shore-based artillery.
PK-306	Soviet Navy	World War II: Battle of Bengtskär: The MO-4-class patrol boat was sunk in the Baltic Sea off Bengtskär, Finland by Uusimaa (Finnish Navy). Sixteen of her crew were taken as prisoners of war.
R-169	Kriegsmarine	World War II: The Type R-151 minesweeper was bombed and sunk by Soviet aircraft off Windau, with a loss of eleven of her crew and twelve wounded, during a combined sea and air attack on a German convoy.

== 27 July ==
List of shipwrecks: 27 July 1941
Ship	State	Description
Ben Strome	United Kingdom	World War II: The fishing trawler was bombed and sunk in the Atlantic Ocean 15 nautical miles (28 km; 17 mi) south east of Fugloy, Faroe Islands by Luftwaffe aircraft with the loss of all ten crew.
Erato	United Kingdom	World War II: Convoy OG 69: The cargo ship was torpedoed and sunk in the Atlantic Ocean (43°10′N 17°30′W) by U-126 (Kriegsmarine) with the loss of nine of her 36 crew. Survivors were rescued by HMS Begonia (Royal Navy).
Hawkinge	United Kingdom	World War II: Convoy OG 69: The cargo ship was torpedoed and sunk in the Atlantic Ocean 800 nautical miles (1,500 km; 920 mi) south west of the Fastnet Rock (44°55′N 17°44′W) by U-203 (Kriegsmarine) with the loss of fifteen of her 31 crew. Survivors were rescued by HMS Sunflower and HMS Vanoc (both Royal Navy).
Inga I	Norway	World War II: Convoy OG 69: The cargo ship was torpedoed and sunk in the Atlantic Ocean (43°10′N 17°30′W) by U-126 (Kriegsmarine) with the loss of three of her nineteen crew.
Kellwyn	United Kingdom	World War II: Convoy OG 69: The cargo ship was torpedoed and sunk in the Atlantic Ocean (approximately 43°N 17°W) by U-79 (Kriegsmarine) with the loss of fourteen of her 23 crew. Survivors were rescued by HMT St Nectan (Royal Navy).
Lenin	Soviet Union	World War II: The 2,713 GRT passenger ship evacuating from Odessa, wandered into Soviet minefield, struck a mine and sank off Cape Sarych with a loss of approximately 2,500 men. 508 people were rescued by Gruziya and Voroshilov.
Nikitas	Italy	World War II: The caïque was attacked and sunk in the Aegean Sea five nautical miles (9.3 km; 5.8 mi) south of Kos, Greece by HMS Tetrarch (Royal Navy).
Smelyi	Soviet Navy	World War II: The Soobrazitelny-class destroyer was torpedoed and damaged in the Gulf of Riga by S 54 (Kriegsmarine). Smelyi was scuttled by a torpedo from TK-54 (Soviet Navy).(

== 28 July ==
List of shipwrecks: 28 July 1941
Ship	State	Description
A8	Royal Navy	World War II: The lighter was bombed and sunk in the Mediterranean Sea of Bardia, Libya by Luftwaffe aircraft with the loss of eight of her crew.
Elbing III	Germany	World War II: The cargo ship was bombed and sunk in the Baltic Sea off Liepāja, Latvia by Soviet Air Force aircraft.
Federico	Italy	World War II: The cargo ship (1,488 GRT) was torpedoed and sunk in the Mediterranean Sea west of Calabria (39°28′N 15°52′E) by HMS Utmost (Royal Navy). One crew was lost. The other were rescued by the auxiliary cruiser Adriatico (Regia Marina).
Lapland	United Kingdom	World War II: Convoy OG 69: The cargo ship was torpedoed and sunk in the Atlantic Ocean north west of Cape Finisterre, Spain (40°10′N 15°30′W) by U-203 (Kriegsmarine). Her 26 crew were rescued by HMS Rhododendron (Royal Navy).
Mayone Parker	United States	The steamboat was wrecked off White Point, Choctawhatchee Bay, Florida.
Monteponi	Italy	World War II: The coaster was torpedoed and sunk in the Tyrrhenian Sea 12 nautical miles (22 km; 14 mi) north of Cape Comino, Sardinia (39°51′N 13°46′E) by HMS Olympus (Royal Navy).
Norita	Sweden	World War II: Convoy OG 69: The cargo ship was torpedoed and sunk in the Atlantic Ocean north west of Cape Finisterre (40°10′N 15°30′W) by U-203 (Kriegsmarine) with the loss of two of her 20 crew.
Strathlochy	United Kingdom	World War II: The fishing trawler was bombed and sunk in the Atlantic Ocean 180 nautical miles (330 km) north west of Rora Head, Orkney Islands by Luftwaffe aircraft.
Wrotham	United Kingdom	World War II: Convoy OG 69: The cargo ship was torpedoed and sunk in the Atlantic Ocean (approximately 43°N 17°W) by U-561 (Kriegsmarine). Her 26 crew were rescued by HMS Fleur de Lys and HMS Rhododendron (both Royal Navy).

== 29 July ==
List of shipwrecks: 29 July 1941
Ship	State	Description
Adam's Beck	United Kingdom	World War II: The collier was bombed and damaged in the North Sea off the mouth of the River Tyne by Luftwaffe aircraft. She sank the next day. Adam's Beck was on a voyage from the River Tyne to the River Thames.
Bernhard	Germany	The cargo ship collided with Frode (Sweden) and sank in the North Sea off Norderney.
Chaucer	United Kingdom	World War II: The cargo ship was shelled and sunk in the Atlantic Ocean (16°46′N 8°01′W) by Orion (Kriegsmarine). Her 48 crew were taken as prisoners of war.
HMS LCT 8	Royal Navy	World War II: The LCT Mk 1-class landing craft tank was bombed and sunk off Sidi Barani, Egypt by Junkers Ju 87 aircraft of I Staffen, Sturzkampfgeschwader 2, Luftwaffe and 239 Squadriglia, Regia Aeronautica.
Leontes	Germany	World War II: The 338 GRT coaster struck a mine and sank in the Baltic Sea off Windau (57°27′N 21°30′E) with a loss of one crew.
Syzran	Soviet Navy	The 1,307 GRT auxiliary minelayer struck a mine and was damaged off Cape Takil, Crimea. Repaired and returned to service as a cargo ship.

== 30 July ==
List of shipwrecks: 30 July 1941
Ship	State	Description
HMS Cachalot	Royal Navy	World War II: The Grampus-class submarine was rammed and sunk in the Mediterranean Sea by Generale Achille Papa (Regia Marina) with the loss of a crew member. Survivors were rescued and taken as prisoners of war.
Pickhuben	Germany	World War II: The fishing trawler struck a mine and sank in the North Sea.
Rotvær	Germany	World War II: Raid on Kirkenes and Petsamo: The fishing trawler was bombed and sunk at Petsamo, Finland by Fairey Swordfish aircraft of 812 Squadron, Fleet Air Arm, based on HMS Furious (Royal Navy) and Fairey Albacore aircraft of 827 Squadron, Fleet Air Arm, based on HMS Victorious (Royal Navy).
San Juan	United States	The cargo ship collided with another vessel and sank in the Indian Ocean (28°32′N 33°03′E).
Shahristan	United Kingdom	World War II: Convoy OS 1: The 6,935 GRT cargo ship on a trip from London for Basrah with general cargo, was torpedoed and sunk in the Atlantic Ocean (35°19′N 23°53′W) by U-371 (Kriegsmarine) with the loss of 65 of the 141 people on board. Survivors were rescued by HMS Derbyshire, HMS Sunflower (both Royal Navy), Campeche (Spain) and Gloria (Panama).
Sitoebondo	Netherlands	World War II: Convoy OS 1: The 7,049 GRT cargo ship on a trip from London for Calcutta with general cargo, was torpedoed and sunk in the Atlantic Ocean (35°19′N 23°53′W) by U-371 (Kriegsmarine) with the loss of 14 of her 77 crew. Survivors were rescued by Campeche and Campero (both Spain).
T-201 Zaryad	Soviet Navy	The Fugas-class minesweeper struck a mine and sank off Ristna Lighthouse, while travelling to meet returning submarines.
TShch-51 Zmey	Soviet Navy	The 245 GRT auxiliary minesweeper struck a mine and sank off Ristna Lighthouse (58°41.5′N 22°27′E), while travelling to meet returning submarines.

== 31 July ==
List of shipwrecks: 31 July 1941
Ship	State	Description
No. 46	Soviet Navy	The Izhoryets-25-class minesweeper was sunk in the Baltic Sea off Tallinn, Estonia.

== Unknown date ==
List of shipwrecks: unknown July 1941
Ship	State	Description
HMS LCA 119	Royal Navy	The landing craft assault was lost sometime in July.
Unnamed	Soviet Navy	World War II: The incomplete Project 122A-class submarine chaser was scuttled at the 300 Yard in Kiev.
Unnamed	Soviet Navy	World War II: The incomplete Project 122A-class submarine chaser was scuttled at the 300 Yard in Kiev.
Unnamed	Soviet Navy	World War II: The incomplete Project 122A-class submarine chaser was scuttled at the 300 Yard in Kiev.
Unnamed	Soviet Navy	World War II: The incomplete Project 122A-class submarine chaser was scuttled at the 300 Yard in Kiev.
