= List of shipwrecks in January 1941 =

List of shipwrecks in January 1941 includes all ships sunk, foundered, grounded, or otherwise lost during January 1941.

== 1 January ==
List of shipwrecks: 1 January 1941
Ship	State	Description
Attendant	United Kingdom	World War II: The cargo ship struck a mine and was damaged in the Thames Estuary off Sheerness, Kent. She was beached, but was later refloated, repaired and returned to service.
Catharina	Netherlands	The 391 GRT coaster on a trip from Southampton for Runcorn with a cargo of china clay, collided with Madrono (Norway) in the English Channel south of The Lizard, Cornwall, United Kingdom and sank (49°51′30″N 5°12′0″W). Her crew were rescued by Madrono.

== 2 January ==
List of shipwrecks: 2 January 1941
Ship	State	Description
Albano	Italy	World War II: The 2,364 GRT cargo ship on a passage from Durazzo for Valona, struck a mine and sank in the Adriatic Sea 1 nautical mile (1.9 km) east of Cape Laghi, Albania (41°10′N 19°24′E) with the loss of five of her 40 crew.
Monte Aralar	Spain	The 2,955 GRT cargo ship on trip from Vilagarcía for Seville with general cargo, was driven ashore at Bonanza. She was a total loss.
Nalgora	United Kingdom	World War II: The 6,579 GRT cargo ship on a trip from Leith for Alexandria with boom defense gear, was torpedoed, shelled and sunk in the Atlantic Ocean 350 nautical miles (650 km) north of the Cape Verde Islands, Portugal (22°24′N 21°11′W) by U-65 (Kriegsmarine). All 105 passengers and crew survived. Some were rescued by Nolisement and Umgeni (both United Kingdom), others reached land in their lifeboat.

== 3 January ==
List of shipwrecks: 3 January 1941
Ship	State	Description
M 3410 Kasia	Kriegsmarine	World War II: The 113 GRT naval drifter/minesweeper got stranded on a sandbar off Cadzand and was wrecked.
Liisa	Finland	World War II: The cargo ship was bombed and sunk at Bremen, Germany by Royal Air Force aircraft. She was later salvaged.
HMT New Spray	Royal Navy	The naval trawler foundered in a gale in the Thames Estuary off Sheerness, Kent.
Nuovo Salvatore	Kingdom of Italy	World War II: The 29 GRT motor fishing cutter was scuttled at Bardia.
Pinewood	United Kingdom	World War II: The cargo ship struck a mine and sank in the Thames Estuary 1.5 nautical miles (2.8 km) south of Southend Pier, Essex with the loss of six of her eighteen crew.
Yrsa	Finland	World War II: The Royal Air Force bombed a bridge over the Kiel Canal dropping it on the cargo ship, sinking her. She was raised and removed, and the canal was reopened.

== 4 January ==
List of shipwrecks: 4 January 1941
Ship	State	Description
Snyg	Norway	World War II: The 1,326 GRT cargo ship on a voyage from Oslo for Kristiansund with cargo of iron and lumber was bombed and sunk west of Hådyret off Egersund, Norway by Hudson bomber of the Royal Air Force. Her crew were rescued by M-1103 (Kriegsmarine).

== 5 January ==
List of shipwrecks: 5 January 1941
Ship	State	Description
Shakespeare	United Kingdom	World War II: The cargo ship was shelled and sunk in the Atlantic Ocean (18°05′N 21°10′W) by Comandante Cappellini (Regia Marina) with the loss of twenty of her 42 crew.
Soemba	Netherlands	World War II: Convoy HX 100: The cargo ship foundered in the Atlantic Ocean 300 nautical miles (560 km) off Cape Race, Dominion of Newfoundland (45°52′N 49°10′W) with the loss of 34 of her 58 crew.
V 303 Tannenberg	Kriegsmarine	The vorpostenboot sank or was sunk on this date. She was subsequently raised, repaired and returned to service.
V 306 Fritz Hincke	Kriegsmarine	World War II: The vorpostenboot struck a mine and sank off IJmuiden, North Holland, Netherlands with the loss of 22 lives.
G-26 Vulcano	Regia Marina	World War II: The 273 GRT auxiliary minesweeper, struck an aerial mine and sank at Tobruk roadstead. Her crew were rescued.

== 6 January ==
List of shipwrecks: 6 January 1941
Ship	State	Description
Antonis	Greece	World War II: The cargo ship was shelled and sunk in the Atlantic Ocean (8°17′N 23°32′W) by Kormoran (Kriegsmarine). Her 28 crew were taken as prisoners of war.
Empire Thunder	United Kingdom	World War II: Convoy OB 269: The 5,965 GRT cargo ship on her maiden trip from Sunderland for William Head, Washington in ballast, straggled behind the convoy. She was torpedoed and sunk in the Atlantic Ocean west of the Hebrides (59°14′N 12°43′W) by U-124 (Kriegsmarine) with the loss of nine or her 39 crew. Survivors were rescued by HMT Kingston Onyx (Royal Navy).
Gadra	United Kingdom	World War II: The fishing trawler struck a mine and sank in the Atlantic Ocean 1.5 nautical miles (2.8 km) off Myling Head, Faroe Islands with the loss of seven of her ten crew.
Lion	United Kingdom	World War II: The tug struck a mine and sank in the River Medway with the loss of all five crew.

== 7 January ==
List of shipwrecks: 7 January 1941
Ship	State	Description
H. H. Petersen	United Kingdom	World War II: The 975 GRT coaster on a trip from Goole for Rochester with a cargo of coal, struck a mine and sank in the North Sea (52°22′N 2°05′E). Her crew were rescued.
Nani	Regia Marina	World War II: The Marcello-class submarine was sunk in the Atlantic Ocean (60°15′N 15°27′W) by HMS Anemone and HMS La Malouine (both Royal Navy). All 53 crew were lost.
UJ 175	Kriegsmarine	World War II: The MOB-FD-class naval trawler/submarine chaser was sunk by mines off Feiestein with the loss of ten lives.
Wolf	Kriegsmarine	World War II: The Type 24 torpedo boat struck a mine shortly before midnight while returning from a mine-laying operation and sank in the North Sea off Dunkerque, Nord, France, with the loss of 45 of her crew.

== 8 January ==
List of shipwrecks: 8 January 1941
Ship	State	Description
Clytoneus	United Kingdom	World War II: The 6,278 GRT cargo ship on a trip from Macassar for Ellesmere Port with a cargo of sugar, was bombed and sunk in the Atlantic Ocean (54°45′N 15°35′W) by a Focke-Wulf Fw 200 aircraft of I Staffeln, Kampfgeschwader 40, Luftwaffe. All 62 crew were rescued by HMS Esperance Bay and HMS Wild Swan (both Royal Navy).
Strathearn	Trinity House	World War II: The lighthouse tender struck a mine and sank in the North Sea (51°45′N 1°10′E) with the loss of fifteen lives.

== 9 January ==
List of shipwrecks: 9 January 1941
Ship	State	Description
Bassano	United Kingdom	World War II: The 4,843 GRT cargo ship on a voyage from New York for Hull with a cargo of iron and steel, was torpedoed and sunk in the Atlantic Ocean (57°57′N 17°42′W) by U-105 (Kriegsmarine) with the loss of one of her 56 crew. Survivors were rescued by HMS Esperance Bay and HMS Wild Swan (both Royal Navy).
Carlo Martinolinch	Italy	World War II: The 4,208 GRT cargo ship on a passage from Messina for Taranto was torpedoed and sunk in the Mediterranean Sea about 6 nautical miles (11 km) off Palizzi Marina (38°28′N 16°44′E) by HMS Parthian (Royal Navy) with the loss of five of her 39 crew.
HMT Dusky Queen	Royal Navy	The naval trawler ran aground in the Strait of Dover and was wrecked.
Giovanni Maria	Italy	World War II: The 636 GRT coaster on a trip from Derna for Tobruk struck a mine and sank in the Mediterranean Sea off 12 nautical miles (22 km) off Tobruk. Her ten crew were rescued and taken prisoners.
Palma	Italy	World War II: The 2,715 GRT cargo ship on a trip from Civitavecchia for Cagliari with general cargo, was torpedoed and sunk in the Mediterranean Sea (39°15′N 9°44′E) off Cape Carbonara, Sardinia by HMS Pandora (Royal Navy) with a loss of two men.
Socony	United Kingdom	World War II: The tanker collided with Tongarito (United Kingdom) and sank in the Atlantic Ocean (51°03′N 41°32′W).
Valdivagna	Italy	World War II: The 5,417 GRT cargo ship on a trip from Civitavecchia for Cagliari with general cargo, was torpedoed and sunk in the Mediterranean Sea (39°15′N 9°44′E) off Cape Carbonara by HMS Pandora (Royal Navy).

== 10 January ==
List of shipwrecks: 10 January 1941
Ship	State	Description
Austvard	Norway	World War II: Convoy SL 62: The cargo ship was bombed and sunk in the Atlantic Ocean 130 nautical miles (240 km) west of County Galway, Ireland by a Focke-Wulf Fw 200 Kondor aircraft of the Luftwaffe with the loss of 23 of her 28 crew.
HMS Gallant	Royal Navy	World War II: Operation Excess: The G-class destroyer hit a mine off Pantellaria after en attack by Circe and Vega (both Regia Marina) drove the convoy toward a mine barrage. Gallant lost her bow, and was towed to Malta by HMS Kingston (Royal Navy); 59 crewmembers lost their lives. The surviving section was damaged beyond repair by German bombers in Valletta, Malta, on 5 April 1942. The wreck was refloated and sunk as a blockship in September 1943.
Inez	Sweden	World War II: The 310 GRT coaster on a passage from Wismar for Malmö ran aground at Oskarsgrundet, off Limhamn and subsequently sank.
Middlesex	United Kingdom	World War II: The cargo ship struck a mine and sank in the Bristol Channel off Flat Holm, Glamorgan. Her crew were rescued. The wreck was subsequently dispersed by explosives.
Vega	Regia Marina	World War II: Operation Excess: The Spica-class torpedo boat was shelled and sunk in the Mediterranean Sea off Cape Bon, Tunisia by HMS Bonaventure and HMS Southampton (both Royal Navy) with the loss of 122 of her 128 crew.

== 11 January ==
List of shipwrecks: 11 January 1941
Ship	State	Description
Beachy	United Kingdom	World War II: The convoy rescue ship was bombed and sunk in the Atlantic Ocean (53°29′N 16°24′W) by a Focke-Wulf Fw 200 aircraft of I Staffeln, Kampfgeschwader 40, Luftwaffe with the loss of five of her crew. Survivors were rescued by HMT Arab (Royal Navy).
Bertha	Sweden	World War II: The cargo ship (1,215 GRT) struck a mine and sank off Copenhagen, Denmark with the loss of four of her seventeen crew.
Brechsee	Germany	World War II: The cargo ship struck a mine and sank off Malmö, Sweden. The Swedish pilot and some of her crew were wounded.
Greyfriars	United Kingdom	World War II: The cargo ship was bombed and damaged in the North Sea off Grimsby, Lincolnshire by Luftwaffe aircraft with the loss of five crew. She came ashore the next morning at Chapel St Leonards, Lincolnshire. Greyfriars was refloated on 14 January.
Locotenant Lepri Remus	Royal Romanian Navy	World War II: The Capitan Dumitrescu-class minesweeper was sunk in the Danube Estuary off Sulina by a mine laid the day before by the minelayer Aurora (Royal Romanian Navy).
Manhattan	United States	Manhattan The ocean liner ran aground off Lake Worth Lagoon, Florida. There were no casualties among her 192 passengers and 482 crew. She was refloated on 4 February, repaired and returned to service.
MTB 37, MTB 39, MTB 40, MTB 74, MTB 75, and MTB 108	Royal Navy	World War II: The motor torpedo boats were destroyed whilst under construction at Vosper Thorneycroft's yard, Southampton, Hampshire during a Luftwaffe air raid.
Oriole	United Kingdom	World War II: The fishing trawler struck a mine and sank in the Atlantic Ocean off the Faroe Islands with the loss of all ten crew.
HMS Southampton	Royal Navy	World War II: The Town-class cruiser was bombed and damaged in the Mediterranean Sea south east of Malta by Junkers Ju 87 aircraft of II Staffeln, Sturzkampfgeschwader 2n, Luftwaffe with the loss of 81 of her 748 crew. She was scuttled by HMS Gloucester and HMS Orion (both Royal Navy).
HMT Uberous	Royal Navy	The naval trawler ran aground off Londonderry.

== 12 January ==
List of shipwrecks: 12 January 1941
Ship	State	Description
Strathrye	United Kingdom	World War II: The 115.7-foot (35.3 m), 212-ton fishing trawler struck a mine and sank 10 miles north of the Great Orme in the Atlantic Ocean (50°35′N 3°59′W). Her crew were rescued.

== 14 January ==
List of shipwrecks: 14 January 1941
Ship	State	Description
Borkum	Germany	The pilot boat ran aground in the Hubert Gat and was wrecked.
Buitenzorg	Netherlands	The 7,073 GRT cargo ship on a trip from Calcutta for Dundee with general cargo, ran aground on the rocks off Grey Island, in the Sound of Mull, Inner Hebrides, United Kingdom (56°30′15″N 5°44′28″W) and was wrecked. There were no casualties.
Emilie Maersk	Denmark	The 2,212 GRT cargo ship ran aground in the North Sea off Borkum, Germany and was wrecked. Her crew survived.
Eumaeus	United Kingdom	World War II: The cargo ship was shelled and sunk in the Atlantic Ocean (8°55′N 15°03′W) by Comandante Cappellini (Regia Marina). There were 337 soldiers and crewmen aboard; 315 were rescued by HMT Bengali and HMT Spaniare (both Royal Navy) but some died of their wounds, bringing the number of dead to 27 or 32 depending on sources.
HMS Fitzroy	Royal Navy	World War II: The Hunt-class minesweeper struck a mine in the North Sea off Harwich, Essex and was beached. She was repaired, and returned to service in June 1941.

== 15 January ==
List of shipwrecks: 15 January 1941
Ship	State	Description
Brask	Norway	World War II: The cargo ship was torpedoed and sunk in the Atlantic Ocean (52°45′N 23°59′W) by Luigi Torelli (Regia Marina) with the loss of twelve of her 32 crew. Survivors boarded the drifting Nemea (Greece) the next day and were later rescued by HMS Highlander (Royal Navy).
Città di Messina	Italy	World War II: The 2,472 GRT cargo ship on a passage from Benghasi for Tripoli was torpedoed and sunk in the Mediterranean Sea off Khoms (32°59′N 14°11′E) by HMS Regent (Royal Navy) with the loss of 432 of the 598 people on board.
Karri	United Kingdom	World War II: The coaster struck a mine and was damaged in Liverpool Bay 2 nautical miles (3.7 km) north of the Bar Lightship ( Trinity House) and was beached at Tranmere, Cheshire. A crew member was killed. She was later refloated, arriving at Liverpool, Lancashire for repairs on 10 April.
Mancunium	United Kingdom	World War II: The sludge carrier struck a mine and sank in Liverpool Bay 2 nautical miles (3.7 km) north east of the Bar Lightship ( Trinity House). Her crew were rescued.
Maywood	United Kingdom	World War II: The cargo ship struck a mine and was damaged in the Irish Sea (51°21′N 3°16′W). She was beached at Whitemore Bay, Barry, Glamorgan.
Nemea	Greece	World War II: The cargo ship was torpedoed and damaged in the Atlantic Ocean (52°33′N 24°13′W) by Luigi Torelli (Regia Marina) with the loss of seventeen of her 31 crew. She was abandoned, but was reboarded on 16 January, along with survivors from Brask (Norway). They were rescued by HMS Highlander (Royal Navy). Nemeasank on 17 January.
Stalker	United Kingdom	World War II: The fishing trawler was bombed in the North Sea off Grimsby, Lincolnshire by Luftwaffe aircraft, and was beached in a sinking condition. All eleven crew were rescued. She was later refloated, repaired and returned to service.
Sudani	Egypt	World War II: The 511 GRT coaster on a passage to Alexandria in ballast, ran aground and was wrecked about 20 nautical miles (37 km) west of Mersa Matruh.

== 16 January ==
List of shipwrecks: 16 January 1941
Ship	State	Description
HMT Desiree	Royal Navy	World War II: The naval trawler struck a mine in the Thames Estuary and sank. Her crew were rescued.
Meandros	Greece	World War II: The cargo ship was bombed and damaged in the Atlantic Ocean (55°15′N 11°40′W) by a Focke-Wulf Fw 200 aircraft of I Staffeln, Kampfgeschwader 40, Luftwaffe. Her crew were rescued. Meandros was taken in tow by a Royal Navy ship, but was scuttled on 20 January.
Nicolaos Filinis	Greece	World War II: The cargo ship was torpedoed and sunk by Luigi Torelli (Regia Marina) with the loss of three of her 29 crew.
Onoba	Netherlands	World War II: The tanker was bombed and sunk in the Atlantic Ocean (55°55′N 12°24′W) by a Focke-Wulf Fw 200 aircraft of I Staffeln, Kampfgeschwader 40, Luftwaffe. Her crew were rescued.
Oropesa	United Kingdom	World War II: The passenger ship was torpedoed and sunk in the Atlantic Ocean (56°28′N 12°00′W) by U-96 (Kriegsmarine) with the loss of 106 of the 249 people on board. Survivors were rescued by HMS Superman, HMS Tenacity and HMS Westcott (all Royal Navy).
Romsey	United Kingdom	World War II: The coaster struck a mine and was damaged in the Bristol Channel (51°41′N 5°09′W). She was beached at Dale, Pembrokeshire.
Spirality	United Kingdom	The coaster collided with Bonnington Court (United Kingdom) at Ipswich, Suffolk. Spirality capsized and sank. She was run into by a Royal Navy vessel on 25 January and by Sanfry (United Kingdom) on 30 January. Spirality was refloated on 16 March but sank again. She was refloated on 27 March, repaired and returned to service.

== 17 January ==
List of shipwrecks: 17 January 1941
Ship	State	Description
Almeda Star	United Kingdom	World War II: The troopship was torpedoed and sunk in the Atlantic Ocean (58°16′N 13°40′W) by U-96 (Kriegsmarine) with the loss of all 325 people on board.
Athelduke	United Kingdom	World War II: The tanker struck a mine and was damaged in the Bristol Channel (51°21′N 3°20′W). She was beached in Whitmore Bay, Barry, Glamorgan.
HTMS Dongkla	Royal Thai Navy	World War II: Franco-Thai War: Battle of Ko Chang: The coastal defence ship was shelled and damaged in the Gulf of Siam off the coast of French Indo-China by La Motte-Picquet and other ships (all French Navy). She ran aground, but sank when towed off.
Ingenieur Riebell	Kriegsmarine	World War II: The escort ship was torpedoed and sunk by a Royal Navy ship at an unknown location. She was subsequently refloated and scrapped.
HTMS Songhkla	Royal Thai Navy	World War II: Franco-Thai War: Battle of Ko Chang: The torpedo boat was shelled and sunk in the Gulf of Siam off the coast of French Indo-China by La Motte-Picquet and other ships (all French Navy).
HTMS Sri Ayuthia	Royal Thai Navy	World War II: Franco-Thai War: The coastal defence ship was torpedoed and damaged by La Motte-Picquet (French Navy). She was beached in the River Chantaboum, French Indo-China.
HTMS Thonburi	Royal Thai Navy	World War II: Franco-Thai War, Battle of Ko Chang: The coastal defence ship was severely damaged by La Motte-Picquet and other ships (all French Navy). She was beached, but was later repaired and returned to service.
HTMS Chonburi	Royal Thai Navy	World War II: Franco-Thai War: Battle of Ko Chang: The torpedo boat was shelled and sunk in the Gulf of Siam off the coast of French Indo-China by La Motte-Picquet and other ships (all French Navy).
Zealandic	United Kingdom	World War II: The passenger ship was torpedoed and sunk in the Atlantic Ocean (58°28′20″N 20°43′00″W) by U-106 (Kriegsmarine) with the loss of all 73 people on board.

== 18 January ==
List of shipwrecks: 18 January 1941
Ship	State	Description
British Union	United Kingdom	World War II: The tanker was shelled and sunk in the Atlantic Ocean (26°34′N 30°58′W) by Kormoran (Kriegsmarine) with the loss of one, or ten, of her 45 crew with 27 captured and made prisoners of war, and seven rescued by HMS Arawa (Royal Navy).
Diana	Netherlands	World War II: Convoy FN 388: The coaster struck a mine and sank in the Bristol Channel (51°18′N 3°10′W). Two of her crew were rescued. Four of her crew and a pilot were killed.
Godfried Bühren	Germany	World War II: The cargo ship struck a mine and sank in the Kattegat 20 nautical miles (37 km) east of the Limfjord.
HMS Kung Wo	Royal Navy	World War II: The auxiliary minelayer was bombed and sunk by Japanese aircraft 6 nautical miles (11 km) north west of "Pompong Island".
Lello	Italy	World War II: The 1,384 GRT cargo ship struck a mine and sank while on a voyage from Palmaria for Civitavecchia.

== 19 January ==
List of shipwrecks: 19 January 1941
Ship	State	Description
Bonnington Court	United Kingdom	World War II: Convoy FN 388: The cargo ship was bombed and sunk in the North Sea off the Sunk Lightship ( Trinity House) by Luftwaffe aircraft with the loss of two of her crew.
Neghelli	Regia Marina	World War II: The Adua-class submarine was sunk in the Mediterranean Sea off Crete, Greece by HMS Greyhound (Royal Navy) with the loss of all 46 crew.
Nymph	United States	The troller struck a reef and sank near Point Retreat, Alaska Territory (58°24′45″N 134°57′15″W). Her two crew members reached shore and were rescued by USCGC Haida ( United States Coast Guard).

== 20 January ==
List of shipwrecks: 20 January 1941
Ship	State	Description
Barneveld	Netherlands	World War II: The cargo liner was captured in the Atlantic Ocean 1,200 nautical miles (2,200 km) west of Freetown, Sierra Leone (approximately 7°S 3°E) by Admiral Scheer (Kriegsmarine). All 100 people on board were taken as prisoners of war. Barneveld was scuttled the next day. She was on a voyage from London, United Kingdom to Table Bay.
Cornish Rose	United Kingdom	The cargo ship was abandoned in the Bristol Channel off Swansea, Glamorgan. Her crew were rescued by the Mumbles Lifeboat.
Florian	United Kingdom	World War II: The cargo ship was torpedoed and sunk in the Atlantic Ocean west of the Faroe Islands (61°14′N 12°05′W) by U-94 (Kriegsmarine) with the loss of all 44 crew. Florian was on a voyage from Oban, Argyllshire to New York, United States.
Heemskerk	Netherlands	World War II: Convoy SL 61: The cargo ship straggled behind the convoy. She was bombed and set on fire in the Atlantic Ocean by a Focke-Wulf Fw 200 aircraft of I Staffeln, Kampfgeschwader 40, Luftwaffe. She was torpedoed and sunk on 26 January (53°43′N 16°07′W) by U-105 (Kriegsmarine) with the loss of eight of her crew.
Portugal	Belgium	World War II: The cargo ship was torpedoed and sunk in the Atlantic Ocean (approximately 50°N 19°W) by Marcello (Regia Marina) with the loss of all hands.
HMT Relonzo	Royal Navy	World War II: The naval trawler struck a mine and sank in the Crosby Channel, off Liverpool, Lancashire with the loss of nineteen of her crew.
Stanpark	United Kingdom	World War II: The cargo ship was shelled and sunk in the Atlantic Ocean (9°27′S 3°00′W) by Admiral Scheer (Kriegsmarine). All 37 crew were rescued and taken as prisoners of war.

== 21 January ==
List of shipwrecks: 21 January 1941
Ship	State	Description
Burma	Italy	The 4,675 GRT cargo ship was driven ashore and broke in two while laid up at El Puerto de Santa María, Spain. Both sections were refloated and scrapped.
B-519 Cesare	Regia Marina	World War II: The 31 GRT auxiliary minesweeper, a converted motor fishing boat, was scuttled at Tobruk prior to city's evacuation.
HMS Englishman	Royal Navy	World War II: The rescue tug was bombed and sunk in the Atlantic Ocean 40 nautical miles (74 km) west of Tory Island, County Donegal, Ireland by Luftwaffe aircraft with the loss of eighteen of her crew.
B-349 Giuseppe C.	Regia Marina	World War II: The 23 GRT auxiliary minesweeper, a converted motor fishing boat, was scuttled at Tobruk prior to city's evacuation.
Korsfjord	Norway	The cargo ship collided with Banda Shahpour (United Kingdom) and sank in the Atlantic Ocean 200 nautical miles (370 km) north of Butt of Lewis, United Kingdom (60°40′N 12°09′W) with the loss of two of her 21 crew. Survivors were rescued by Banda Shahpour.
Mary E. O'Hara	United States	The fishing vessel sank in 50 feet (15 m) of water off the coast of Massachusetts in Outer Boston Harbor, 1/2 nautical mile (930 m) east of Finn's Ledge (42°23′00″N 070°55′00″W) after colliding with the barge Winifred Sheridan (United States). A total of eighteen people from the two vessels lost their lives.
Maria G.	Italy	World War II: The 98 GRT motor schooner on a trip from Arbatax for Civitavecchia, struck a mine and sank 38 nautical miles (70 km) northeast of Cape Comino, Sardinia.
P-17 Maria Luigi III	Regia Marina	World War II: The requisitioned 27 GRT steam tug was scuttled at Tobruk prior to city's evacuation.
Temple Mead	United Kingdom	World War II: The cargo ship was bombed and sunk in the Atlantic Ocean (54°14′N 14°30′W) by a Focke-Wulf Fw 200 aircraft of I Staffeln, Kampfgeschwader 40, Luftwaffe with the loss of fourteen of her 40 crew.
Winifred Sheridan	United States	The barge sank in up to 50 feet (15 m) of water off the coast of Massachusetts in Outer Boston Harbor, 0.5 nautical miles (0.93 km; 0.58 mi) east of Finn's Ledge (42°23′00″N 070°55′00″W) after colliding with the fishing vessel Mary E. O'Hara (United States). A total of 18 people from the two vessels lost their lives.

== 22 January ==
List of shipwrecks: 22 January 1941
Ship	State	Description
B-107 Angelo Giovanni	Regia Marina	World War II: The 24 GRT auxiliary minesweeper, a converted motor schooner, was scuttled at Tobruk prior to city's evacuation.
Augusto Tomei	Kingdom of Italy	World War II: The 296 GRT motor schooner was scuttled at Tobruk prior to city's evacuation.
R-271 Diego	Regia Marina	World War II: The 63 GRT auxiliary minesweeper, a converted motor schooner, on her way from Tobruk to Derna, was shelled and sunk in the Mediterranean Sea west of Tobruk by HMAS Vampire (Royal Australian Navy). All ten crew were rescued and made prisoners of war.
R-55 Fabio Filzi	Regia Marina	World War II: The 69 GRT auxiliary minesweeper, a converted motor schooner, was scuttled at Tobruk prior to city's evacuation.
G-60 Giuseppe Garibaldi	Regia Marina	World War II: The 47 GRT auxiliary minesweeper, a converted motor schooner, was scuttled at Tobruk prior to city's evacuation.
Jamaica Planter	United Kingdom	World War II: The cargo ship struck a mine and was damaged in the Bristol Channel off Barry Island, Glamorgan and was beached at Barry. She was refloated on 13 February and beached in Whitemore Bay, refloated again five days later and taken to Barry where she was repaired.
Kapetan Stratis	Greece	World War II: The cargo ship was bombed and sunk in the Atlantic Ocean (54°34′N 12°08′W) by a Focke-Wulf Fw 200 aircraft of I Staffeln, Kampfgeschwader 40, Luftwaffe with the loss of all 28 hands.
Liguria	Italy	The 15,354 GRT troopship, heavily damaged during 5 July 1940 attack, was scuttled at Tobruk. She was refloated in 1950 and scrapped.
HMT Luda Lady	Royal Navy	World War II: The naval trawler struck a mine and sank in the Humber. Her crew were rescued.
Madre delle Grazie	Italy	World War II: The requisitioned 25 GRT motor cutter was scuttled at Tobruk prior to city's evacuation.
R-16 Monte Pasubio	Regia Marina	World War II: The 49 GRT auxiliary minesweeper, a converted motor fishing boat, was scuttled at Tobruk prior to city's evacuation.
B-48 Nina	Regia Marina	World War II: The 44 GRT auxiliary minesweeper, a converted motor fishing boat, was scuttled at Tobruk prior to city's evacuation.
Nuovo S. Giuseppe	Kingdom of Italy	World War II: The 23 GRT motor fishing cutter was scuttled at Tobruk prior to city's evacuation.
Oslofjord	Norway	World War II: The troopship – beached at Tynemouth with her back broken since striking a mine off Newcastle upon Tyne, Northumberland, United Kingdom, on 1 December 1940, – broke in two, capsized, and sank in bad weather at 55°0.17′N 1°23.72′W.
P-16 Rosina	Regia Marina	World War II: The requisitioned 32 GRT steam tug was scuttled at Tobruk prior to city's evacuation.
B-357 S. Nicolò	Regia Marina	World War II: The 21 GRT auxiliary minesweeper, former motor schooner, was scuttled at Tobruk prior to city's evacuation.
San Giorgio	Regia Marina	The Italian cruiser San Giorgio scuttled at Tobruk World War II: Battle of Tobruk: The San Giorgio-class cruiser was scuttled at Tobruk.
HMS Saint Cyrus	Royal Navy	World War II: The Saint-class tugboat struck a mine and sank in the Humber with the loss of most of her crew.
R-38 Virgo Lauretana	Regia Marina	World War II: The requisitioned 44 GRT motor schooner was scuttled at Tobruk prior to city's evacuation.

== 23 January ==
List of shipwrecks: 23 January 1941
Ship	State	Description
Arora	United Kingdom	World War II: The fishing trawler (192 GRT) left Aberdeen that day for a fishing trip and went missing. A lifeboat damaged by bullets and bomb splinters was found off Orkneys some time later. She is thought to have been sunk by German aircraft and was lost with all nine crew.
Langleegorse	United Kingdom	World War II: Convoy SL 61: The cargo ship (4,524 GRT) was bombed and sunk in the Atlantic Ocean (53°19′N 13°11′W) by a Focke-Wulf Fw 200 aircraft of I Staffeln, Kampfgeschwader 40, Luftwaffe with the loss of all 37 crew.
Lurigethan	United Kingdom	World War II: Convoy SL 61: The cargo ship (3,564 GRT) was bombed and set afire in the Atlantic Ocean 280 nautical miles (520 km) west of Galway Bay, Ireland (53°46′N 16°00′W) by a Focke-Wulf Fw 200 aircraft of I Staffeln, Kampfgeschwader 40, Luftwaffe. 15 crew and a gunner were killed. She then straggled behind the convoy and was abandoned. The 35 survivors were rescued by HMS Arabis (Royal Navy) and Milos (Sweden). The abandoned Lurigethan was torpedoed and sunk on 26 January at 53°50′N 15°40′W by U-105 (Kriegsmarine).
Mostyn	United Kingdom	World War II: The cargo ship (1,859 GRT), a straggler of convoy HG 50, was bombed and heavily damaged in the Atlantic Ocean (54°30′N 14°52′W) by a Focke-Wulf Fw 200 aircraft of I Staffeln, Kampfgeschwader 40, Luftwaffe. Out of a crew of 21 and 1 gunner, 2 crew died. She was abandoned, and a tug sent to assist on the 25th failed to locate the ship, which was presumed sunk.

== 24 January ==
List of shipwrecks: 24 January 1941
Ship	State	Description
Corheath	United Kingdom	World War II: The cargo ship (1,096 GRT) struck a mine and sank in the Thames Estuary (51°27′N 1°25′E) with the loss of three lifes, the master and two gunners. There were 19 survivors.
Mandasor	United Kingdom	World War II: The cargo ship (5,144 GRT) was shelled and then sunk with demolition charges in the Indian Ocean 300 nautical miles (560 km) east of the Seychelles (4°18′S 61°00′E) by Atlantis (Kriegsmarine) with the loss of six of her 82 crew. The survivors, 20 of them being wounded, were taken as prisoners of war.
Vespasian	Norway	World War II: Convoy OB 276: The cargo ship (1,570 GRT) straggled behind the convoy the day before. She was torpedoed and sunk in the Atlantic Ocean (55°57′N 21°55′W) by U-123 (Kriegsmarine) with the loss of all eighteen crew.
Wirta	Finland	The 4,028 GRT cargo ship on a voyage from Baltimore for Petsamo, ran aground in Skerjafjörður, Iceland, and broke in two. She was declared a total loss. The whole crew was saved.

== 25 January ==
List of shipwrecks: 25 January 1941
Ship	State	Description
Spey	United Kingdom	The 178 GRT coaster on a passage from Tyne for Seahouses in ballast, ran aground at Coquet Island and subsequently sank.
Svea	United States	The fishing vessel was wrecked on the east shore of McLean Arm (54°47′45″N 131°57′15″W), Alaska Territory. The two people on board survived.
Tuck A. Hoe	United States	The fishing vessel was wrecked at Palm Point near Katalla, Alaska Territory (60°11′N 144°33′W). Her four crew survived.

== 26 January ==
List of shipwrecks: 26 January 1941
Ship	State	Description
Beemsterdijk	Netherlands	World War II: The cargo ship (8,869 GRT) struck a mine (probably a British one) and was damaged in the Bristol Channel 12 nautical miles (22 km) west of the Smalls Lighthouse. The crew all abandoned her in lifeboats but later all reboarded the ship. Various ships sent to help here found nothing as she reported a wrong location. She capsized the next day in bad weather at 51°17′N 6°23′W and sank with all lifeboats. Only four of her 42 crew survived on a raft and one drowned before they were rescued three days later.
Belgia	Sweden	World War II: Convoy FN 92: The cargo ship was bombed and damaged in the Thames Estuary by Luftwaffe aircraft with the loss of six of her 26 crew. Survivors were rescued by HMS Cotswold (Royal Navy). The burning ship drifted ashore at Frinton-on-Sea, Essex. She was later salvaged, repaired and returned to service as Empire Bell.
Catford	United Kingdom	World War II: The cargo ship struck a mine and was damaged in the Thames Estuary and was beached. She was later refloated.
Meriones	United Kingdom	World War II: The cargo ship ran aground on the Haisboro' Sands, Norfolk (52°53′N 1°47′E). She was bombed and sunk by Luftwaffe aircraft. Her crew were rescued.

== 27 January ==
List of shipwrecks: 27 January 1941
Ship	State	Description
Assunta in Cielo 2	Italy	The 29 GRT motor cutter developed a leak in her keel area and was beached approximately 4 kilometres (2.2 nmi) from Tolemaide, Italian Cyrenaica.
Caerphilly Castle	United Kingdom	World War II: The fishing trawler (275 GRT), originally laid down as a Castle-class trawler, was bombed and sunk in the Atlantic Ocean (52°35′N 12°00′W) by a Luftwaffe Focke-Wulf Fw 200 Condor aircraft with the loss of three of her crew.
HMT Darogah	Royal Navy	World War II: The naval trawler struck a mine and sank in the Thames Estuary.
Ingo	Germany	World War II: The cargo ship was torpedoed and sunk in the Mediterranean Sea off Cape Bon, Tunisia (34°27′N 14°11′E) by Fairey Swordfish aircraft of 830 Squadron, Fleet Air Arm. Eight of her crew and three passengers were killed. Survivors were rescued by Orione (Regia Marina).
Ringwall	United Kingdom	World War II: The coaster struck a mine and sank in the Irish Sea south of the Isle of Man.

== 28 January ==
List of shipwrecks: 28 January 1941
Ship	State	Description
Alhena	Netherlands	The 4,930 GRT cargo ship on a trip from Liverpool for Port Said and Haifa with general cargo, ran aground and got stranded in heavy fog on the Pladdy Rock, off South Rock lightship. She was later refloated and taken in tow for the Clyde, but sank whilst under tow on 10 September 1942.
Erling Jarl	Norway	The cargo ship ran aground and sank at Brønnøysund, Nordland with the loss of a crew member. She was later raised, repaired and re-entered service as Bodø.
Grelrosa	United Kingdom	World War II: Convoy SC 19: The cargo ship was bombed and sunk in the Atlantic Ocean (55°12′N 15°41′W) by a Focke-Wulf Fw 200 Kondor aircraft of I Staffeln, Kampfgeschwader 40, Luftwaffe with the loss of five of her 36 crew.
Homeside	United Kingdom	The 4,617 GRT cargo ship on a trip from Pepel for Tees with a cargo of iron ore, was reported in the Atlantic Ocean (43°52′N 8°40′W) with a severe leak. No further trace, presumed foundered with all hands.
K. V. Kruse	Canada	While under tow by the tug LaPoint (Flag unknown) off the coast of British Columbia in the vicinity of the Queen Charlotte Islands, the barge – a former five-masted schooner – disappeared when her towline broke in bad weather. She drifted 125 nautical miles (232 km) north as a derelict, and the United States Coast Guard discovered her wreck in Cordova Bay in the Alexander Archipelago east of Long Island, Alaska Territory in February 1941.
Kate	Greece	World War II: The cargo ship struck a mine and sank off Artemisium. Two of her crew were killed. Also reported as being bombed and sunk by Luftwaffe aircraft at Thessaloniki.
King Robert	United Kingdom	World War II: Convoy SC 19: The cargo ship was torpedoed and sunk in the Atlantic Ocean (56°00′N 15°23′W) by U-93 (Kriegsmarine). Her 42 crew were rescued by HMS Anthony and HMT Lady Madeleine (both Royal Navy).
Pandion	United Kingdom	World War II: The cargo ship was bombed and damaged at 55°34′N 10°22′W by a Focke-Wulf Fw 200 aircraft of I Staffeln, Kampfgeschwader 40, Luftwaffe. She was beached in Lough Swilly but later broke in two in a storm and was declared a total loss.
Tafelburg	Union of South Africa	World War II: The tanker struck a mine in the Bristol Channel (51°21′N 3°16′W) and was beached at Porthkerry, Glamorgan, United Kingdom. She was refloated on 27 March and beached at Whitemore Bay but broke in two and was declared a constructive total loss. Tafelburg was salvaged, repaired and entered service as Empire Heron.
Urla	United Kingdom	World War II: Convoy HX 102: The cargo ship straggled behind the convoy. She was torpedoed and sunk in the Atlantic Ocean (54°54′N 19°00′W) by Luigi Torelli (Regia Marina). Her 42 crew were rescued.
W. B. Walker	United Kingdom	World War II: Convoy SC 19: The tanker was torpedoed and damaged in the Atlantic Ocean 150 nautical miles (280 km) south east of Rockall, Inverness-shire (56°00′N 15°23′W) by U-93 (Kriegsmarine) with the loss of four of her 47 crew. She was taken in tow by HMS Anthony (Royal Navy) but broke in two four days later. The bow section was scuttled on 6 February; the stern section sank on 13 February. Survivors were rescued by HMS Antelope (Royal Navy) and HMS Anthony.

== 29 January ==
List of shipwrecks: 29 January 1941
Ship	State	Description
Afric Star	United Kingdom	World War II: The cargo ship was shelled and sunk in the Atlantic Ocean 400 nautical miles (740 km) west of St. Vincent by Kormoran (Kriegsmarine). Her crew were rescued and taken as prisoners of war.
Aikaterini	Greece	World War II: Convoy SC 19: The cargo ship was torpedoed and sunk in the Atlantic Ocean (56°00′N 15°23′W) by U-93 (Kriegsmarine). Her 31 crew were rescued but one of them died shortly after being rescued.
Eurylochus	United Kingdom	World War II: The cargo ship was shelled and sunk in the Atlantic Ocean (8°15′N 25°04′W) by Kormoran (Kriegsmarine) with the loss of fifteen of her 81 crew. Survivors were rescued by Kormoran and Monte Teide (Spain). The 38 survivors on Kormoran were taken as prisoners of war.
King Robert	United Kingdom	World War II: Convoy SC 19: The cargo ship was torpedoed and sunk in the Atlantic Ocean (56°00′N 15°23′W) by U-93 (Kriegsmarine). Her 42 crew were rescued.
Sesostris	Egypt	World War II: Convoy SC 19: The cargo ship straggled behind the convoy. She was torpedoed and sunk in the Atlantic Ocean (56°00′N 15°23′W) by U-106 (Kriegsmarine) with the loss of all hands.
Westmoreland	United Kingdom	World War II: The cargo ship struck a mine and was damaged in the Irish Sea 3 nautical miles (5.6 km) due west of the Bar Lightship ( Trinity House) and was abandoned. She was later reboarded and towed into Liverpool, Lancashire.
West Wales	United Kingdom	World War II: Convoy SC 19: The cargo ship straggled behind the convoy. She was torpedoed and sunk in the Atlantic Ocean (56°00′N 15°23′W) by U-94 (Kriegsmarine) with the loss of sixteen of her 37 crew. Survivors were rescued by HMS Antelope and HMS Anthony (both Royal Navy).

== 30 January ==
List of shipwrecks: 30 January 1941
Ship	State	Description
Austvard	Norway	World War II: Convoy SL 62: The cargo ship was bombed and sunk in the Atlantic Ocean 130 nautical miles (240 km) west of County Galway, Ireland by a Focke-Wulf Fw 200 Kondor aircraft of the Luftwaffe with the loss of 23 of her 28 crew.
Rushpool	United Kingdom	World War II: Convoy SC 19: The cargo ship straggled behind the convoy. She was torpedoed and sunk in the Atlantic Ocean (56°00′N 15°42′W) by U-94 (Kriegsmarine). Her 40 crew were rescued by HMS Antelope (Royal Navy).

== 31 January ==
List of shipwrecks: 31 January 1941
Ship	State	Description
Botusk	United Kingdom	World War II: Convoy HX 103: The collier struck a mine and sank 6 nautical miles (11 km) north east of North Rona Island with the loss of four of her fifteen crew. Survivors were rescued by HMS Verbena (Royal Navy).
Desmoulea	United Kingdom	World War II: Convoy AN 14, Attack on Convoy AN 14: The tanker was torpedoed and disabled by the torpedo boats Lupo and Libra (Regia Marina) off Crete (35°33′32″N 25°34′14″E) with the loss of a crew member. Desmoulea was initially abandoned by its crew, but, after being reboarded, it was towed to Souda Bay by HMS Dainty (Royal Navy) and spent the rest of the war as a stores hulk at Bombay, India.
Emmaplein	Netherlands	World War II: Convoy HX 103: The cargo ship struck a mine and sank 6 nautical miles (11 km) north east of North Rona Island. Her 34 crew were rescued by Ariel (UK) and two Royal Navy corvettes.
HMS Huntley	Royal Navy	World War II: The Hunt-class minesweeper was bombed and sunk in the Mediterranean Sea 30 nautical miles (56 km) west of Mersa Matruh, Egypt (31°25′N 26°48′E) by Heinkel He 111 aircraft of II Staffeln, Kampfgeschwader 26, Luftwaffe with the loss of eighteen of her crew.
Maja	Denmark	World War II: The cargo ship struck a mine and sank in the Elbe 3 nautical miles (5.6 km) north west of the Elbe II Lightship (Nazi Germany).
Olympier	Belgium	World War II: The cargo ship was bombed and sunk in by aircraft of 1 Staffeln, Kampfgeschwader 40, Luftwaffe 120 nautical miles (220 km) off Tory Island, County Donegal, Ireland (56°04′N 11°00′W) with the loss of eight of her 27 crew.
Pizarro	United Kingdom	World War II: The cargo ship was torpedoed and sunk in the Atlantic Ocean 650 nautical miles (1,200 km) off Cape Finisterre, Spain (49°03′N 19°40′W) by Dandolo (Regia Marina) with the loss of 23 of her 29 crew. Survivors were rescued by Macbrae (United Kingdom) and landed at Lisbon, Portugal.
Rowanbank	United Kingdom	World War II: Convoy SL 62: The cargo ship was bombed and sunk in the Atlantic Ocean (57°00′N 16°30′W) by Luftwaffe aircraft with the loss of all 68 crew.
Saturnus	Netherlands	World War II: The balloon barrage ship struck a mine in the Irish Sea and was abandoned. She came ashore at Maughold Head, Isle of Man. Later refloated and towed to Douglas.
Sollum	Egypt	World War II: The transport ship was bombed and damaged in the Mediterranean Sea off Sidi Barrani by Luftwaffe aircraft. She was consequently beached.
F-94 Ursus	Regia Marina	World War II: The requisitioned 407 GRT steam tug while towing floating battery GM 239 from Zara to Brindisi, was shelled and sunk in the Adriatic Sea (42°50′N 16°30′E) by HMS Rorqual (Royal Navy). Nine of the eighteen crew of Ursus and fourteen of the 49 of GM 239 were reported killed or missing.

== Unknown date ==
List of shipwrecks: Unknown date 1941
Ship	State	Description
Lycia	United Kingdom	World War II: The cargo ship was scuttled as a blockship in Scapa Flow (58°53′03″N 2°53′57″W).
Narval	Free French Naval Forces	World War II: The submarine was sunk by enemy action with the loss of all 50 crew.
