= Marcello-class submarine =

Submarine class

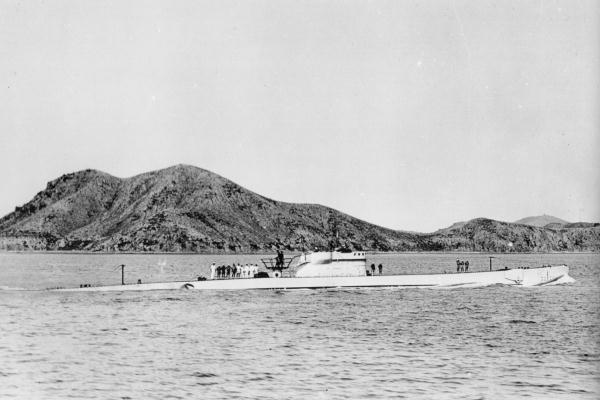
- German submarine UIT24 in the Inland Sea, Japan, August, 1944. UIT-24 was the ex-Italian submarine Comandante Cappelini and was later the IJN I-503.

Class overview
- Name: Marcello class
- Builders: Cantieri Riuniti dell'Adriatico (9); Odero Terni Orlando (2)
- Operators: Regia Marina; Kriegsmarine; Imperial Japanese Navy
- In commission: 1938–1947
- Completed: 11
- Lost: 10
- Scrapped: 1

General characteristics
- Type: Submarine
- Displacement: 1,060 long tons (1,077 t) surfaced; 1,313 long tons (1,334 t) submerged
- Length: 73 m (239 ft 6 in)
- Beam: 7.19 m (23 ft 7 in)
- Draught: 5.1 m (16 ft 9 in)
- Propulsion: Diesel-electric; 2 × CRDA diesels (first 9 vessels); 2 × Fiat diesel engines (last 2 vessels); 2 × CRDA electric engines (all vessels)
- Speed: 17.4 knots (20.0 mph; 32.2 km/h) surfaced; 8 knots (9.2 mph; 15 km/h) submerged
- Range: 2,500 nmi (4,600 km) at 17 knots (31 km/h) surfaced; 7,500 nmi (13,900 km) at 9.4 knots (17 km/h) surfaced; 8 nmi (15 km) at 8 knots (15 km/h) submerged; 120 nmi (220 km) at 3 knots (6 km/h) submerged
- Test depth: 100 m (330 ft)
- Complement: 58
- Armament: 8 × 533 mm (21 in) torpedo tubes (4 bow, 4 stern); 2 × 100 mm (4 in) / 47 caliber guns; 4 × 13.2 mm (0.52 in) machine guns

The Marcello class was a class of nine submarines built in 1937 and 1938 by CRDA in Trieste for the Royal Italian Navy (Italian: Regia Marina). Two similar submarines built in 1939 at La Spezia by Oto Melara are sometimes considered part of the class. All eleven served in the Mediterranean Sea at the start of the Second World War. After Provana's 1940 sinking, the remaining boats were transferred to the BETASOM Atlantic submarine base at Bordeaux in August 1940. After four boats had been sunk in the Atlantic, Barbarigo and Comandante Cappellini were then selected for conversion to "transport submarines" in order to exchange rare or irreplaceable trade goods with Japan. Cargo capacity of 160 tons reduced reserve buoyancy from 20–25% to 3.5–6%; and armament was reduced to defensive machine guns. Only Dandolo was in operational condition at the end of the war.

== Class members ==
=== Lorenzo Marcello ===
Lorenzo Marcello (pennant number ML) was launched on 20 November 1937 and completed on 5 March 1938. When Italy declared war, Marcello was temporarily disabled by air conditioning system leaks. Leakage of chloromethane refrigerants during submerged operations had caused central nervous system poisoning of the crew. After unsuccessful patrols in the Mediterranean, Marcello sailed on 31 October 1940 and passed the Strait of Gibraltar on 5 November for an Atlantic patrol to Bordeaux on 2 December. Marcello sank one ship on its first BETASOM patrol and was lost to unknown causes on its next patrol in late February 1941.

Ships sunk by Marcello
Ship	Flag	Patrol	Date	Tonnage (GRT)	Notes
Portugal	Belgium	2nd	20 January 1941	1,550	Freighter

=== Enrico Dandolo ===
Enrico Dandolo (pennant number DO) was launched 20 November 1937 and completed on 25 March 1938. After unsuccessful patrols in the Mediterranean, Dandolo sailed on 13 August 1940 and passed the Strait of Gibraltar on 16 August for an Atlantic patrol to Bordeaux on 10 September. Dandolo sank one ship and damaged another en route to Bordeaux. After an unsuccessful patrol, Dandolo sank one ship on its second BETASOM patrol. After another unsuccessful patrol, Dandolo sailed from Bordeaux on 26 June, passed the Strait of Gibraltar on 2 July, and returned to Naples on 7 July. Dandolo spent the remainder of the war in the Mediterranean damaging a neutral French tanker on 4 November 1941, sinking the neutral Spanish freighter Castillo Oropesa on 8 November 1941, and damaging the cruiser HMS Cleopatra on 16 July 1943. Dandolo sailed to the United States after the Italian armistice, and was scrapped in 1948.

Ships sunk by Dandolo
Ship	Flag	Patrol	Date	Tonnage (GRT)	Notes
Irvington Court	United Kingdom	1st	26 August 1940	5,187	Freighter; no casualties
Pizarro	United Kingdom	3rd	31 January 1941	1,367	Tanker; six survivors from a crew of 29
Total:				6,554	

=== Lazzaro Mocenigo ===
Lazzaro Mocenigo (pennant number MO) was launched 20 November 1937. Mocenigo was sunk off Cagliari during a 13 May 1943 USAAF air raid.

=== Giacomo Nani ===
Giacomo Nani (pennant number NI) was launched 16 January 1938. After unsuccessful patrols in the Mediterranean, Nani sailed on 29 September 1940 and passed the Strait of Gibraltar for an Atlantic patrol to Bordeaux on 4 November. Nani sank two ships en route to Bordeaux. Nani was lost to unknown causes sometime after 3 January 1941 on its first BETASOM patrol. j According to the Daily Telegraph obituary of Cpt Humphrey Boyes-Smith RN who died 24/6/99, Nani was sunk by depth charges from the Flower-class corvette HMS Anemone on 7/1/41.

Ships sunk by Nani
Ship	Flag	Patrol	Date	Tonnage (GRT)	Notes
HMS Kingston Sapphire	Royal Navy	1st	5 October 1940	—N/a	naval trawler
Maggie	Sweden	1st	27 October 1940	1,583	Freighter

=== Sebastiano Veniero ===
Sebastiano Veniero (pennant number VN) was launched 14 February 1938 and completed on 6 June. After an unsuccessful Mediterranean patrol, Veniero passed the Strait of Gibraltar on 7 July 1940 for an Atlantic patrol near the Canary Islands and returned past Gibraltar on 27 July. This was the first Axis submarine to pass Gibraltar during World War II, and the report of conditions delivered upon return to Naples on 1 August assisted future attempts to pass the strait. Veniero sailed on 28 September 1940 and passed the Strait of Gibraltar for an Atlantic patrol to Bordeaux on 2 November. After sinking two ships in six BETASOM patrols, Veniero sailed from Bordeaux on 8 August 1941 and returned through the Strait of Gibraltar to La Spezia on 2 September. On its seventh patrol after return to the Mediterranean, Veniero was assumed sunk (identification not confirmed) by a Consolidated PBY Catalina on 7 June 1942.

Ships sunk by Veniero
Ship	Flag	Patrol	Date	Tonnage (GRT)	Notes
Anastassia	Greece		18 December 1940	2,883	Freighter from convoy SC 15; 9 survivors
Agnete Maersk	United Kingdom		24 March 1941	2,104	Freighter from convoy OG 56; no survivors
Total:				4,987	

=== Andrea Provana ===
Andrea Provana (pennant number PR) was launched 16 March 1938. Provana was the first Italian submarine lost after Italy's declaration of war. Provana was sunk by the French sloop La Curieuse on 16 June 1940.

=== Agostino Barbarigo ===
Agostino Barbarigo (pennant number BO) was launched 12 June 1938. After unsuccessful patrols in the Mediterranean, Barbarigo sailed on 13 August 1940 and passed the Strait of Gibraltar for an Atlantic patrol to Bordeaux on 8 September. After unsuccessful BETASOM patrols from 14 October to 13 November 1940 and from 10 February to 8 March 1941, Barbarigo damaged the British freighter Manchester Port on 15 May 1941. Barbarigo sank two ships on its fourth BETASOM patrol. After an unsuccessful patrol from 22 October to 12 November 1941, Barbarigo sank the neutral Spanish freighter Navemar on 23 January 1942. Barbarigo sank one ship and damaged another during its seventh BETASOM patrol. Following an encounter with cruisers USS Omaha and USS Milwaukee coming to assist the damaged ship, Captain Grossi notoriously asserted he had sunk a battleship of the United States Navy. On the following patrol, a similarly unsuccessful launch of torpedoes at the Flower-class corvette HMS Petunia was reported as the sinking of another battleship. Barbarigo sank two Allied ships and another neutral Spanish freighter Monte Igueldo on its ninth BETASOM patrol. After conversion to a transport submarine, Barbarigo sailed from Bordeaux on 17 June 1943 and was sunk by aircraft in the Bay of Biscay.

Ships sunk by Barbarigo
Ship	Flag	Patrol	Date	Tonnage (GRT)	Notes
Macon	United Kingdom	5th	25 July 1941	4,727	Freighter; 21 survivors from a crew of 50
Horn Shell	United Kingdom	5th	26 July 1941	8,272	Tanker; 40 survivors from a crew of 57
Charlbury	United Kingdom	8th	29 May 1942	4,835	Freighter; 40 survivors from a crew of 42
Alfonso Penna	Brazil	10th	3 March 1943	3,540	Cargo liner
Stag Hound	United States	10th	3 March 1943	6,085	Freighter
Total:				27,459	

=== Angelo Emo ===
Emo (pennant number EO) was launched 29 June 1938 and completed on 10 October. After an unsuccessful first war patrol in the Mediterranean, Emo sailed on 29 August 1940 and passed the Strait of Gibraltar for an Atlantic patrol to Bordeaux on 3 October. Emo sank one ship en route to Bordeaux. After unsuccessful patrols from 31 October to 6 November 1940 and from 5 December to 1 January 1941, Emo sank one ship on its third BETASOM patrol. After another unsuccessful BETASOM patrol, Emo sailed from Bordeaux on 20 August and passed the Strait of Gibraltar to return to Naples on 1 September 1941. After spending two months as a training boat at the submarine school in Pula, Emo completed several Mediterranean war patrols before being sunk by the naval trawler HMS Lord Nuffield on 7 November 1942 during the preliminary stages of Operation Torch.

Ships sunk by Emo
Ship	Flag	Patrol	Date	Tonnage (GRT)	Notes
Saint Agnes	United Kingdom	2nd	14 September 1940	5,199	Freighter from convoy SL 46; no casualties
Western Chief	United Kingdom	5th	14 March 1941	5,759	Freighter from convoy SC 24; 21 survivors from a crew of 43
Total:				10,958	

=== Francesco Morosini ===
Francesco Morosini (pennant number MS) was launched 28 July 1938. After unsuccessful war patrols in the Mediterranean, Morosini sailed on 25 October 1940 and passed the Strait of Gibraltar on 31 October for an Atlantic patrol to Bordeaux on 28 November. After unsuccessful patrols from 22 January to 24 February and from 30 April to 20 May 1941, Morosini sank two ships on its third BETASOM patrol. After two more unsuccessful patrols, Morosini sank two ships during Operation Neuland. While returning to France after sinking another ship during a second patrol to the Caribbean Sea, Morosini was lost to unknown causes after 8 August 1942.

Ships sunk by Morosini
Ship	Flag	Patrol	Date	Tonnage (GRT)	Notes
Rupert de Larrinaga	United Kingdom	4th	14 July 1941	5,358	Freighter; no casualties
Lady Somers	United Kingdom	4th	15 July 1941	8,194	Cargo liner; no casualties
Oscilla	Netherlands	7th	16 March 1942	6,341	Tanker torpedoed with 4 killed
Peder Bogen	United Kingdom	7th	23 March 1942	9,741	Tanker torpedoed at 24°53′N 57°30′W with no casualties
Tysa	Netherlands	8th	30 June 1942	5,327	Freighter; no casualties
Total:				40,927	

=== Comandante Cappellini ===
Cappellini (pennant number CL) was launched 14 May 1939 as the first boat of the "improved Marcello class". After an unsuccessful war patrol in the Mediterranean, Cappellini sailed on 29 September 1940 and passed the Strait of Gibraltar on 5 October for an Atlantic patrol to Bordeaux on 5 November. Cappellini sank one ship en route to Bordeaux and two ships on its first BETASOM patrol. After unsuccessful patrols from 16 April to 20 May, 29 June to 6 July, and 17 November to 29 December 1941, Cappellini sank two ships on its fifth BETASOM patrol. During the following patrol, Cappellini participated in rescue operations of the Laconia incident. After another unsuccessful patrol, Cappelini was converted to a transport submarine. Cappellini sailed on 11 May and reached Singapore on 13 July 1943 with 160 tons of mercury, aluminum, welding steel, 20mm guns, ammunition, bomb prototypes, bombsights and tank blueprints. Cappellini was seized by Germany following the Italian armistice of September 1943 and commissioned into the Kriegsmarine as UIT-24. UIT-24 was then seized by the Imperial Japanese Navy following German surrender in May 1945 and renamed I-503. I-503 was found at Kobe when Japan surrendered and scuttled in Kii Suido by the United States Navy.

Ships sunk by Cappellini
Ship	Flag	Patrol	Date	Tonnage (GRT)	Notes
Kabalo	Belgium	1st	15 October 1940	5,051 GRT	Freighter of convoy OB 223; 1 killed from a crew of 43
Shakespeare	United Kingdom	2nd	5 January 1941	5,029 GRT	Freighter of convoy OB 262; 20 killed from a crew of 42
Eumaeus	United Kingdom	2nd	14 January 1941	7,472 GRT	Troopship; 23 killed from a crew of 86
Tisnaren	Sweden	6th	19 May 1942	5,747 GRT	Freighter of convoy OS 27; No casualties
Dinsdale	United Kingdom	6th	1 June 1942	8,250 GRT	Tanker
Total:				31,549	

=== Comandante Faà di Bruno ===
Comandante Faà di Bruno (also called Faà di Bruno) (pennant number FB) was launched 18 June 1939 and completed on 23 October 1939 as the second boat of the "improved Marcello class". After two unsuccessful war patrols in the Mediterranean, Faà di Bruno sailed on 28 August 1940 and passed the Strait of Gibraltar on 3 September for an Atlantic patrol to Bordeaux on 5 October. Faà di Bruno was lost to unknown causes on its first BETASOM patrol after sailing from Bordeaux on 31 October 1940.

== See also ==
- Italian submarines of World War II

== Sources ==
- Marcello class at regiamarina.net
- Erminio Bagnasco, Submarines of World War Two, Cassell & Co, London. 1977 ISBN 1-85409-532-3
- Brice, Martin Axis Blockade Runners of World War II (1981) Naval Institute Press ISBN 0-87021-908-1
- Kafka, Roger & Pepperburg, Roy L. Warships of the World Cornell Maritime Press (1946)
- Taylor, J.C. German Warships of World War II (1966) Doubleday & Company
- Reference to Nani at uboat.net
