= Trawler =

Trawler may refer to:

== Boats ==
- Fishing trawler, used for commercial fishing
- Naval trawler, a converted trawler, or a boat built in that style, used for naval purposes
  - Trawlers of the Royal Navy
- Recreational trawler, a pleasure boat built trawler-style

== Books ==
- Trawler, a book by Redmond O'Hanlon
