= German submarine U-93 (1940) =

German World War II submarine

Coordinates: 36°10′N 15°52′W

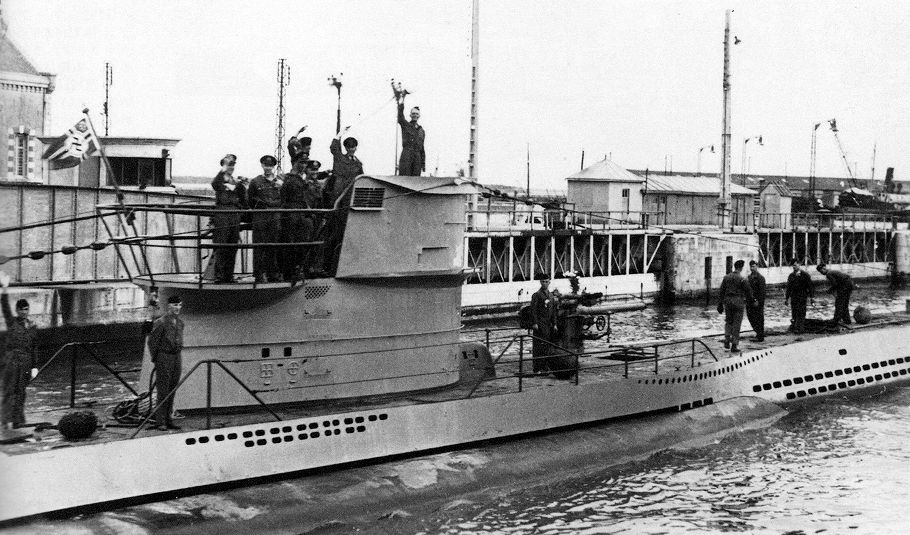
- U-93 departing on her maiden voyage

History

Nazi Germany
- Name: U-93
- Ordered: 30 May 1938
- Builder: Germaniawerft, Kiel
- Yard number: 598
- Laid down: 9 September 1939
- Launched: 8 June 1940
- Commissioned: 30 July 1940
- Fate: Sunk 15 January 1942

General characteristics
- Class & type: Type VIIC submarine
- Displacement: 769 tonnes (757 long tons) surfaced; 871 t (857 long tons) submerged
- Length: 67.10 m (220 ft 2 in) o/a; 50.50 m (165 ft 8 in) pressure hull
- Beam: 6.20 m (20 ft 4 in) o/a; 4.70 m (15 ft 5 in) pressure hull
- Height: 9.60 m (31 ft 6 in)
- Draught: 4.74 m (15 ft 7 in)
- Installed power: 2,800–3,200 PS (2,100–2,400 kW; 2,800–3,200 bhp) (diesels); 750 PS (550 kW; 740 shp) (electric)
- Propulsion: 2 shafts; 2 × diesel engines; 2 × electric motors
- Speed: 17.7 knots (32.8 km/h; 20.4 mph) surfaced; 7.6 knots (14.1 km/h; 8.7 mph) submerged
- Range: 8,500 nmi (15,700 km; 9,800 mi) at 10 knots (19 km/h; 12 mph) surfaced; 80 nmi (150 km; 92 mi) at 4 knots (7.4 km/h; 4.6 mph) submerged
- Test depth: 230 m (750 ft); Crush depth: 250–295 m (820–968 ft)
- Complement: 4 officers, 40–56 enlisted
- Armament: 5 × 53.3 cm (21 in) torpedo tubes (four bow, one stern); 14 × torpedoes or 26 TMA mines; 1 × 8.8 cm (3.46 in) deck gun (220 rounds); 1 x 2 cm (0.79 in) C/30 AA gun

Service record
- Part of: 7th U-boat Flotilla; 30 July 1940 – 15 January 1942
- Identification codes: M 05 631
- Commanders: Kptlt. Claus Korth; 30 July 1940 – 30 September 1941; Oblt.z.S. Horst Elfe; 6 October 1941 – 15 January 1942
- Operations: 7 patrols: 1st patrol: 9 – 25 October 1940; 2nd patrol: 7 – 29 November 1940; 3rd patrol: 11 January – 14 February 1941; 4th patrol: 3 May – 10 June 1941; 5th patrol: 12 July – 21 August 1941; 6th patrol: 18 October – 21 November 1941; 7th patrol: 23 December 1941 – 15 January 1942
- Victories: 8 merchant ships sunk (43,392 GRT)

German submarine U-93 was a Type VIIC U-boat of Nazi Germany's Kriegsmarine during World War II. She was laid down on 9 September 1939 at the F. Krupp Germaniawerft in Kiel as yard number 598, launched on 8 June 1940 and commissioned on 30 July 1940 under Kapitänleutnant Claus Korth.

She sank eight ships of 43,392 gross register tons (GRT) in seven patrols but was herself sunk by a British destroyer on 15 January 1942.

== Design ==
German Type VIIC submarines were preceded by the shorter Type VIIB submarines. U-93 had a displacement of 769 tonnes (757 long tons) when at the surface and 871 tonnes (857 long tons) while submerged. She had a total length of 67.10 m (220 ft 2 in), a pressure hull length of 50.50 m (165 ft 8 in), a beam of 6.20 m (20 ft 4 in), a height of 9.60 m (31 ft 6 in), and a draught of 4.74 m (15 ft 7 in). The submarine was powered by two Germaniawerft F46 four-stroke, six-cylinder supercharged diesel engines producing a total of 2,800 to 3,200 metric horsepower (2,060 to 2,350 kW; 2,760 to 3,160 shp) for use while surfaced, two AEG GU 460/8–27 double-acting electric motors producing a total of 750 metric horsepower (550 kW; 740 shp) for use while submerged. She had two shafts and two 1.23 m (4 ft) propellers. The boat was capable of operating at depths of up to 230 metres (750 ft).

The submarine had a maximum surface speed of 17.7 knots (32.8 km/h; 20.4 mph) and a maximum submerged speed of 7.6 knots (14.1 km/h; 8.7 mph). When submerged, the boat could operate for 80 nautical miles (150 km; 92 mi) at 4 knots (7.4 km/h; 4.6 mph); when surfaced, she could travel 8,500 nautical miles (15,700 km; 9,800 mi) at 10 knots (19 km/h; 12 mph). U-93 was fitted with five 53.3 cm (21 in) torpedo tubes (four fitted at the bow and one at the stern), fourteen torpedoes, one 8.8 cm (3.46 in) SK C/35 naval gun, 220 rounds, and a 2 cm (0.79 in) C/30 anti-aircraft gun. The boat had a complement of between forty-four and sixty.

== Service history ==
The boat's first patrol was preceded by a trip from Kiel to Kristiansand in Norway.

=== First patrol ===
She left the Norwegian port on 9 September 1940, heading for St. Nazaire in France which she reached, via the North Sea and the gap between the Faroe and Shetland Islands, on 25 October.

On the way, she sank the Hurunui on the 15th, 120 nautical miles (220 km; 140 mi) west of the Butt of Lewis, (the most northerly point of the Isle of Lewis in the Outer Hebrides). Two crew members died, but there were 73 survivors. She was also attacked three times in one day (17 October), twice by ships and once by an aircraft; no damage was caused. She sank the Dokka south of Iceland on the 17th: The survivors were then questioned by the Germans (a fairly common practice). They said that the sunken ship was the Cukna, but Korth saw through this ruse de guerre. U-93 was forced to dive by the presence and gunfire of HMS Folkestone.

After that, the boat headed for mid-ocean before docking at her French Atlantic base.

=== Second, third and fourth patrols ===
U-93's second voyage was uneventful, but during her third sortie she sank the Dione II with gunfire, northwest of Northern Ireland. She was also attacked by an Armstrong Whitworth Whitley of No. 502 Squadron RAF. The damage was such that the boat required repairs lasting three months.

The submarine's fourth patrol, which commenced on 12 July 1941, was disrupted when three men were wounded in an accident involving a machine gun. Nevertheless, she sank the Elusa on 21 May south southeast of Cape Farewell (Greenland).

=== Fifth and sixth patrols ===
Her fifth patrol took her as far south as a point west of Western Sahara. She was unsuccessfully bombed on the return journey west of Cape St. Vincent in Portugal

The boat's sixth patrol was to an area east of Newfoundland and Labrador on the Canadian side of the Atlantic.

=== Fate ===
Her seventh and final sortie began with her departure from St. Nazaire on 23 December 1941. She was sunk by depth charges dropped by HMS Hesperus between Portugal and the Azores on 15 January 1942.

=== Wolfpacks ===
U-93 took part in five wolfpacks, namely:

- West (8 – 26 May 1941)
- Süd (22 July – 5 August 1941)
- Schlagetot (23 October – 1 November 1941)
- Raubritter (1 – 8 November 1941)
- Seydlitz (27 December 1941 – 15 January 1942)

== Summary of raiding history ==
Date	Name	Nationality	Tonnage (Note: Tonnages are in gross register tons.)	Fate
15 October 1940	Hurunui	United Kingdom	9,331	Sunk
17 October 1940	Dokka	Norway	1,168	Sunk
17 October 1940	Uskbridge	United Kingdom	2,715	Sunk
29 January 1941	Aikatern	Greece	4,929	Sunk
29 January 1941	King Robert	United Kingdom	5,886	Sunk
29 January 1941	W.B. Walker	United Kingdom	10,468	Sunk
4 February 1941	Dione II	United Kingdom	2,660	Sunk
21 May 1941	Elusa	Netherlands	6,235	Sunk

== Bibliography ==
- Busch, Rainer; Röll, Hans-Joachim (1999). German U-boat commanders of World War II : a biographical dictionary. Translated by Brooks, Geoffrey. London, Annapolis, Md: Greenhill Books, Naval Institute Press. ISBN 1-55750-186-6.
- Busch, Rainer; Röll, Hans-Joachim (1999). Der U-Boot-Krieg, 1939-1945: Deutsche U-Boot-Verluste von September 1939 bis Mai 1945 [German U-boat losses from September 1939 to May 1945] (in German). Vol. IV. Hamburg, Berlin, Bonn: Mittler. ISBN 3-8132-0514-2.
- Edwards, Bernard (1996). Dönitz and the Wolf Packs – The U-boats at War. Cassell Military Classics. p. 35. ISBN 0-304-35203-9.
- Gröner, Eric; Jung, Dieter; Maass, Martin (1991). German Warships 1815-1945: U-boats and Mine Warfare Vessels. Vol. 2. Translated by Thomas, Keith; Magowan, Rachel. London: Conway Maritime Press. ISBN 0-85177-593-4.
