= Oropesa =

Oropesa may refer to:

== Places ==
- Oropesa, Spain, a town in Toledo, Spain
- Oropesa, Antabamba, the capital of Oropesa District, Antabamba, Peru
- Oropesa, Quispicanchi, the capital of Oropesa District, Quispicanchi, Peru
- Oropesa del Mar, a municipality in the comarca of Plana Alta in the Valencian Community, Spain

== People with the surname ==
- Eddie Oropesa (born 1971), Cuban baseball pitcher
- Elizabeth Oropesa (born 1954), Filipina actress
- Francisco Oropesa, suspect shooter in the 2023 Cleveland, Texas shooting
- Lisette Oropesa (born 1983), American soprano

== Other uses ==
- Oropesa (minesweeping), a naval minesweeping device
- SS Oropesa, a British steam turbine ocean liner launched in 1919

== See also ==
- Oropesa del Mar, a municipality in Castellón, Spain
- Oropesa District (disambiguation)
- Oropeza
