= Cecil Pugh =

RAF Chaplain and recipient of the George Cross (1898–1941)

Coordinates: 44°30′N 28°30′E

The Reverend Herbert Cecil Pugh GC
- Rev Pugh as an RAF Chaplain
- Born: 2 November 1898; Johannesburg, South African Republic
- Died: 5 July 1941 (aged 42); SS Anselm, Atlantic Ocean
- Cause of death: Killed in action
- Education: Jeppe High School for Boys; Mansfield College, Oxford
- Spouse: Amy Lilian Tarrant
- Children: Geoffrey, Alastair, Fiona
- Parent(s): Harry and Janet Pugh

Ecclesiastical career
- Religion: Christian
- Church: Congregational
- Ordained: 1924
- Congregations: Camberley Congregational Church, Surrey 1924–27; Christ Church, Friern Barnet, Middlesex 1927–39; RAF Bridgnorth 1939–41
- Title: The Reverend
- Military career
- Allegiance: British Empire
- Branch: South African Army; Royal Air Force
- Service years: 1917–19; 1939–41
- Rank: RAF Squadron Leader
- Units: South African Field Ambulance; RAF Volunteer Reserve
- Conflicts: First World War: Western Front; Second World War: Atlantic War; Sinking of SS Anselm †
- Awards: George Cross

Herbert Cecil Pugh, GC (2 November 1898 – 5 July 1941), usually called Cecil Pugh, was a Congregational Church minister and is the only clergyman to have received the George Cross. He was a South African who served in the First World War as a South African Army medical orderly and in the Second World War as a Royal Air Force chaplain. Pugh died in 1941 by remaining aboard a sinking troop ship to minister to trapped and wounded military personnel.

== Life ==
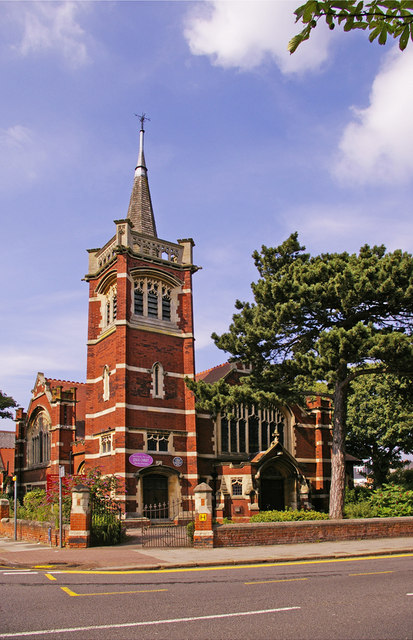
Christ Church, Friern Barnet, where Pugh was pastor from 1927 to 1939

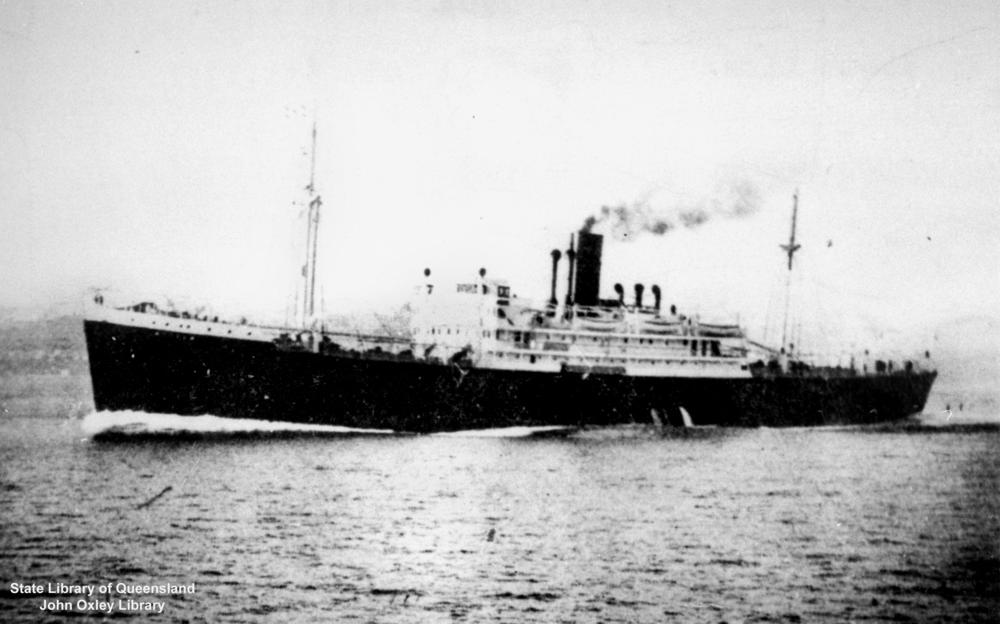
Anselm before becoming a troop ship

Pugh was the second of seven children of Harry Walter and Jane (Douglas) Pugh. He was born in 1898 in Johannesburg and attended Jeppe High School for Boys. In the First World War in 1917–19 he was a medical orderly in France with the South African Field Ambulance.

After the war Pugh went to England, studied at Mansfield College, Oxford 1920–24 and became a Congregational clergyman. He was in civilian ministry at Camberley Congregational Church 1924–27 and then at Christ Church, Friern Barnet, Middlesex 1927–39. Pugh married Amy Lilian Tarrant and they had three children: sons Geoffrey and Alastair and daughter Fiona.

== RAF service ==
When the Second World War broke out in 1939 Pugh became an RAF chaplain, with the rank of squadron leader. He served at RAF Bridgnorth in Shropshire until 1941, when he was posted to Takoradi on the Gold Coast. His passage to Takoradi was aboard the troop ship Anselm to Freetown, Sierra Leone.

Anselm was a cargo and passenger liner that had been converted into a troop ship by designating its passenger accommodation as officers' quarters and turning her holds into accommodation for other ranks. It had capacity for about 500 troops, but on this occasion was heavily overloaded with about 1,200 British Army, Royal Marines and RAF personnel. The 175 RAF personnel were on their way to serve in the North African Campaign.

On 5 July the German submarine U-96 torpedoed Anselm about 300 miles (480 km) north of the Azores. The explosion caused extensive damage below decks, where collapsed overheads and wrecked ladders injured or trapped many of the men in one of the converted holds. One survivor states that officers got away in boats from Anselm's stern without waiting to help their men. Pugh, however, remained aboard, tending the wounded and helping to launch lifeboats and liferafts.

As Anselm's bow settled lower in the water, Pugh turned his attention to his fellow airmen injured and trapped in one of the converted holds. He told some Royal Marines to lower him on a rope into the hold, insisting "Where my men are, I have to be". The Marines tried to dissuade him, but Pugh insisted, saying "My love of God is greater than my fear of death" so they did as he said. Once in the hold he knelt to pray with the trapped men, with seawater already up to his shoulders.

Anselm sank 22 minutes after it was hit. Pugh was not seen again.

== George Cross ==
Pugh's actions profoundly affected some of the 1,060 survivors. One at first thought his self-sacrifice had been "silly", but then recognised his bravery as an example. Other airmen and soldiers praised Pugh's "bravery" and "sacrifice".

Anselm's survivors went on to serve in the North African and Italian campaigns. As they returned to Britain after the war, their recollections of Pugh started to appear in the News of the World and the Daily Express. In 1947, his bravery was honoured with the George Cross, which King George VI presented to his widow Amy Pugh and Alastair Pugh, one of his sons, at Buckingham Palace.

At RAF Bridgnorth Pugh's example continued to be remembered until the station closed in 1963.

Pugh's George Cross citation states:

The Reverend H. C. Pugh, after seeing service in this country, was posted to Takoradi and embarked on H.M.T. Anselm, carrying over 1,300 passengers; for West Africa at the end of June, 1941. She was torpedoed in the Atlantic in the early hours of the 5 July 1941. One torpedo hit a hold on Deck C, destroying the normal means of escape. Mr. Pugh came up on deck in a dressing gown and gave all the help he could. He seemed to be everywhere at once, doing his best to comfort the injured, helping with the boats and rafts (two of these were rendered unserviceable as a result of the explosion) and visiting the different lower sections where men were quartered.

When he learned that a number of injured airmen were trapped in the damaged hold, he insisted on being lowered into it with a rope. Everyone demurred because the hold was below the water line and already the decks were awash and to go down was to go to certain death. He simply explained that he must be where his men were. The deck level was already caving in and the hold was three parts full of water so that, when he knelt to pray, the water reached his shoulders. Within a few minutes the ship plunged and sank and Mr. Pugh was never seen again. He had every opportunity of saving his own life but, without regard for his own safety and in the best tradition of the Service and of a Christian minister, he gave up his life for others."

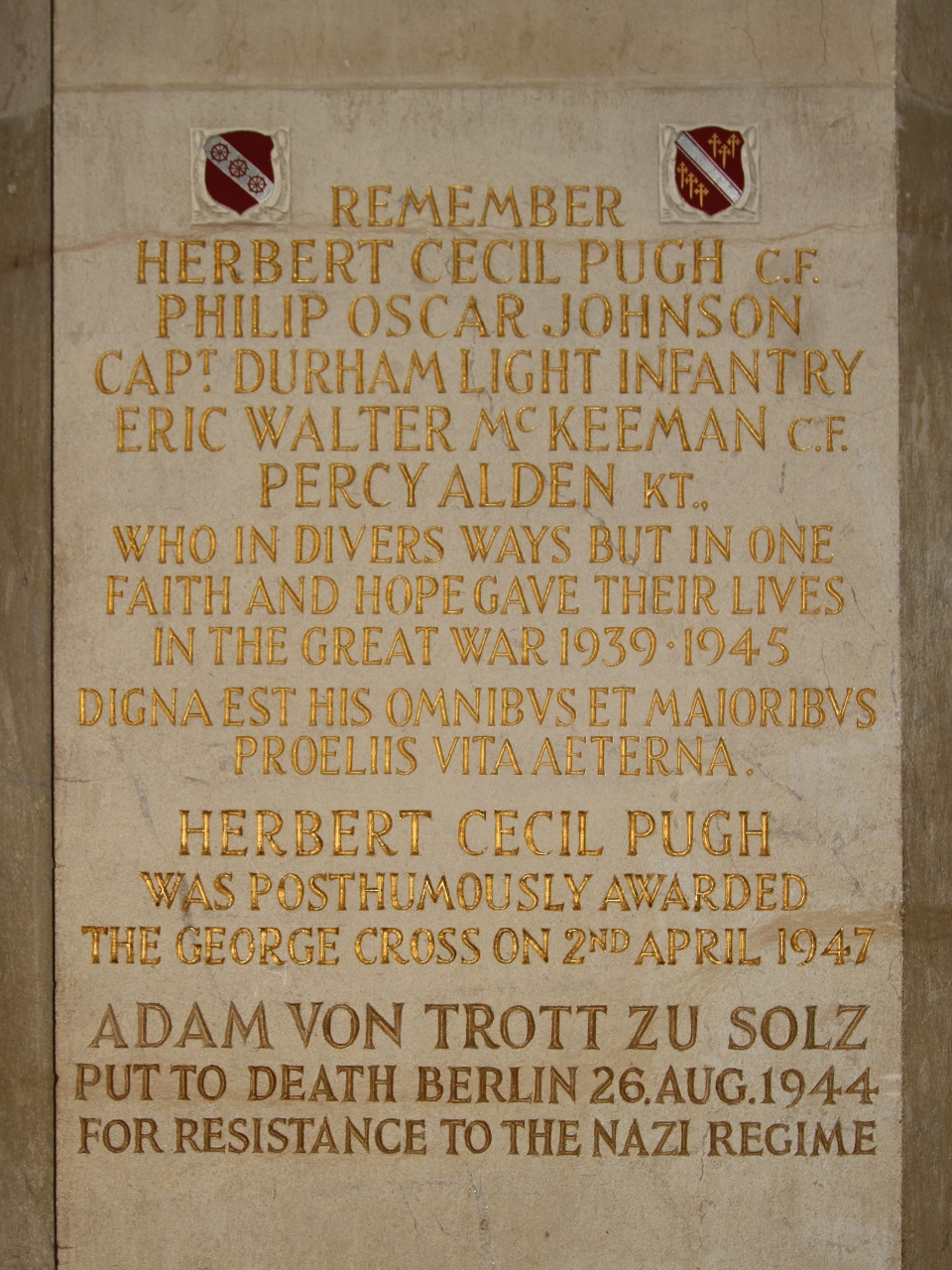
Inscription in the chapel of Mansfield College, Oxford in memory of alumni including Pugh

A photograph of Pugh, alongside his GC citation, is displayed at the Armed Forces Chaplaincy Centre, Amport House.

A blue plaque on a house in East Castle Street, Bridgnorth, notes his residence there during his ministry at RAF Bridgnorth and his honour.

An inscription in the chapel of Mansfield College, Oxford commemorates alumni killed in the Second World War, including Pugh.

== See also ==
- The Four Chaplains — United States Army chaplains who gave their lives in similar circumstances in 1943
- Tim Vakoc (1960–2009) – US Army chaplain severely wounded in Iraq in 2004

== Sources ==
- Darling, Ian (2009). "8: The Corporal's Ring". Amazing Airmen: Canadian Flyers in the Second World War. Toronto: Dundurn Press. pp. 97–105. ISBN 978-1554884247.
