= Oropeza =

Oropeza is a Spanish surname. Notable people with the surname include:

- Jenny Oropeza (1957–2010), California State Senator
- Sam Oropeza (born 1985), American mixed martial artist
- B. J. Oropeza (born 1961), American New Testament scholar and theologian

== Paternal name ==
- Francisco Oropeza, suspect shooter of the 2023 Cleveland, Texas shooting
- Jorge Oropeza (born 1983), Mexican footballer
- Juan Oropeza (1906–1971), Venezuelan lawyer, diplomat, writer, educator and political science expert
- Luis Oropeza (born 1995), Mexican footballer

== Maternal name ==
- Enrique Priego Oropeza (born 1947), Mexican politician
- Renato Prada Oropeza (born 1937), Bolivian-Mexican scientist, literary researcher and writer
- Martha Ramirez-Oropeza (born 1952), Mexican artist, researcher
- Andrade "El Idolo" (born 1989 as Manuel Alfonso Andrade Oropeza), aka La Sombra, a Mexican luchador

== See also ==
- Oropesa (disambiguation)
