= K79 =

K79 or K-79 may refer to:

- K-79 (Kansas highway), a state highway in Kansas
- HMS Petunia (K79), a former UK Royal Navy ship
