= SS Oropesa =

At least four British ships of the Pacific Steam Navigation Company have been named SS Oropesa.

- SS Oropesa – 1894 ship that was an armed merchant cruiser in World War I and was sunk in 1917.
- SS Oropesa – 1919 ocean liner that served in World War II and was sunk in 1941.
- SS Oropesa – A ship transferred from Shaw, Savill & Albion Line to PSNC and renamed Oropesa in 1968.
- SS Oropesa –1978 ship transferred from PSNC to Shaw, Savill & Albion in 1982.
