= SS Cathay (1924) =

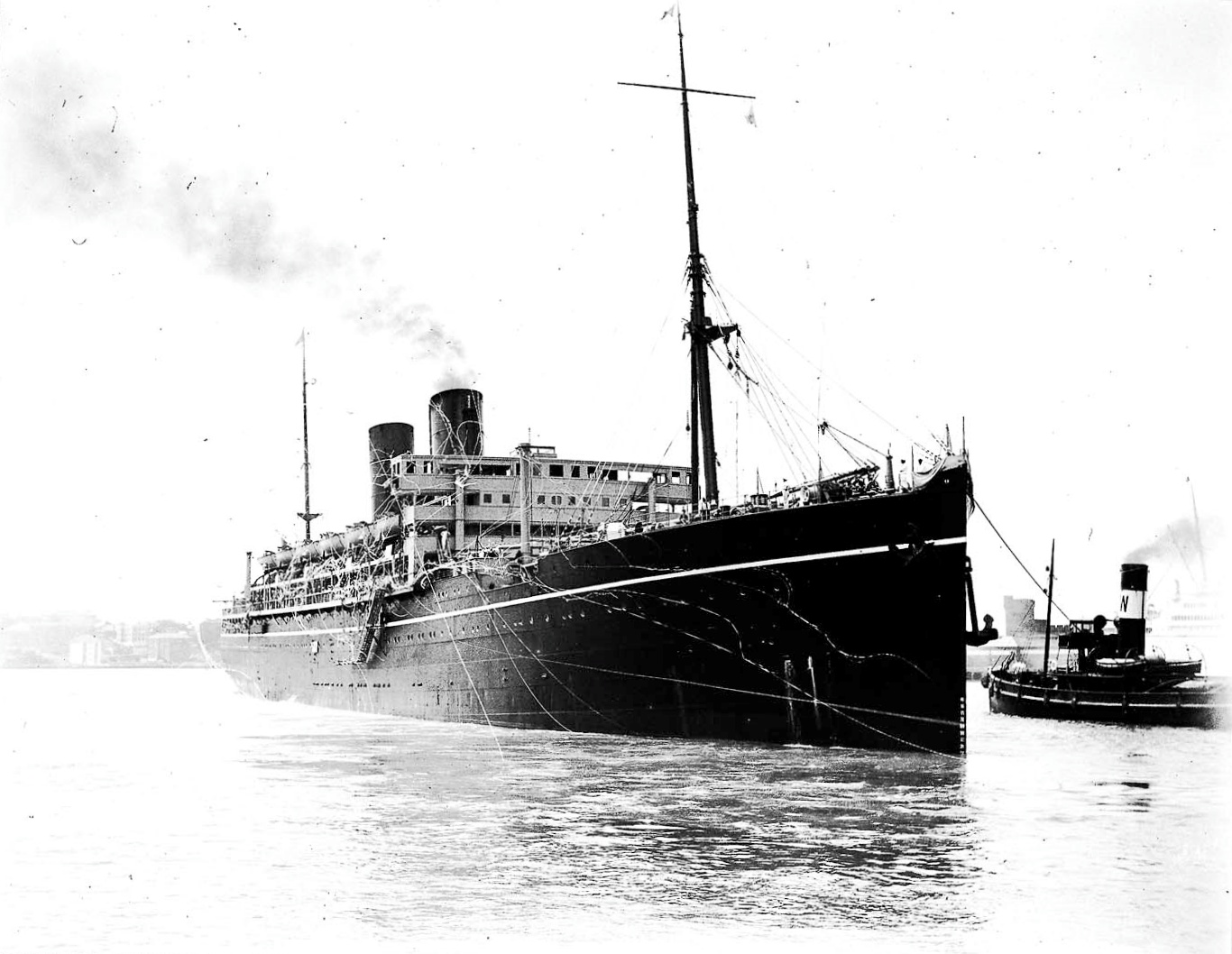
- Cathay in Sydney Harbour in the 1930s

History

United Kingdom
- Name: Cathay
- Namesake: Cathay
- Owner: P&O Steam Navigation Co
- Operator: P&O SN Co (1925–39); (United Kingdom) Royal Navy (1939–42)
- Port of registry: (United Kingdom) Glasgow
- Route: London – Sydney
- Ordered: 1923
- Builder: Barclay Curle & Co, Glasgow
- Yard number: 602
- Laid down: 1924
- Launched: 31 October 1924
- Completed: March 1925
- Acquired: 12 March 1925
- Maiden voyage: 27 March 1925
- Identification: UK official number 148843; Code letters KSHB (until 1933); Call sign GCDF (1934 onward)
- Fate: Sunk by air raid, 1942

General characteristics
- Class & type: P&O Cathay-class ocean liner
- Tonnage: 1926: 15,121 GRT, 8,696 NRT; 1934: 15,225 GRT, 8,746 NRT
- Length: 546.9 ft (166.7 m) o/a; 523.5 ft (159.6 m) registered; 522.2 ft (159.2 m) p/p
- Beam: 70.2 ft (21.4 m)
- Depth: 42.3 ft (12.9 m)
- Decks: 3
- Installed power: 1,905 NHP, 13,437 ihp
- Propulsion: 2 × screws; 2 × quadruple-expansion engines
- Speed: 16 knots (30 km/h; 18 mph)
- Capacity: Passengers: First Class 203; Second Class 103; Refrigerated cargo space: 196,270 cu ft (5,558 m^{3})
- Crew: 278
- Sensors & processing systems: as built: wireless direction finding; by 1936: as above plus echo sounding device.
- Armament: October 1939: 8 × BL 6-inch Mk XII guns; 2 × QF 3-inch 20 cwt AA guns
- Notes: sister ships: Comorin, Chitral

SS Cathay was a P&O passenger steamship that was built in Scotland in 1925 and sunk in the Mediterranean Sea in 1942. In the Second World War she was first an armed merchant cruiser and then a troop ship. In 1942 she took part in Operation Torch, and was sunk in a German air raid off Bougie, Algeria.

Cathay was the first of a class of three ocean liners for P&O, all built at the same time. Her sister ships were Comorin and Chitral.

This was the second of three P&O liners called Cathay. The first was a compound steamship that was built in Scotland in 1872 and scrapped in Japan in 1903. The third was a steam turbine ship that P&O owned between 1961 and 1976. She was built in Belgium in 1957 as Baudouinville. In 1976 P&O sold her to China, where she was renamed first Kengshin and then Shanghai.

== Building ==
Until 1914, P&O maintained a regular fortnightly liner service between Britain and Australia. But the company lost several ships in First World War, so after the Armistice it was able to restore only a monthly service on the route.

In the early 1920s P&O ordered several new passenger liners, of different sizes, for its various routes. It ordered Cathay and her sisters in 1923.

Barclay Curle & Company in Glasgow built Cathay and Comorin, and launched them on the same day, 31 October 1924. Lady Inchcape, the wife of P&O Chairman The Earl of Inchcape, performed the launching ceremony for Cathay. Alexander Stephen and Sons built Chitral, launching her on 27 January 1925.

Cathay was the first of the three sisters to be completed. She passed her sea trials on 12 March 1925. Comorin was completed that April and Alexander Stephen & Sons completed Chitral in June.

Cathay was 546.9 ft (166.7 m) long overall and 522.2 ft (159.2 m) between perpendiculars. Her registered length was 523.5 feet (159.6 m), her beam was 70.2 feet (21.4 m) and her depth was 42.3 feet (12.9 m). Her tonnages were 15,121 GRT and 8,696 NRT. Cathay and her sisters each had a cruiser stern, whereas P&O ships built before the First World War had counter sterns.

Cathay had twin screws. Each screw was driven by a four-cylinder quadruple-expansion steam engine. Between them her twin engines were rated at 1,905 NHP or 13,437 ihp, and gave her a speed of 16 knots (30 km/h). She had two funnels. The after one was a dummy.

Cathay had berths for 306 passengers: 203 in First Class and 103 in Second Class. One of Inchcape's daughters, the Honourable Elsie Mackay, supervised the interior décor of the passenger accommodation. Cathay's holds were refrigerated, and had space for 196,270 cu ft (5,558 m^{3}) of cargo.

P&O registered Cathay at Glasgow. Her UK official number was 148843 and her code letters were KSHB.

== Civilian career ==
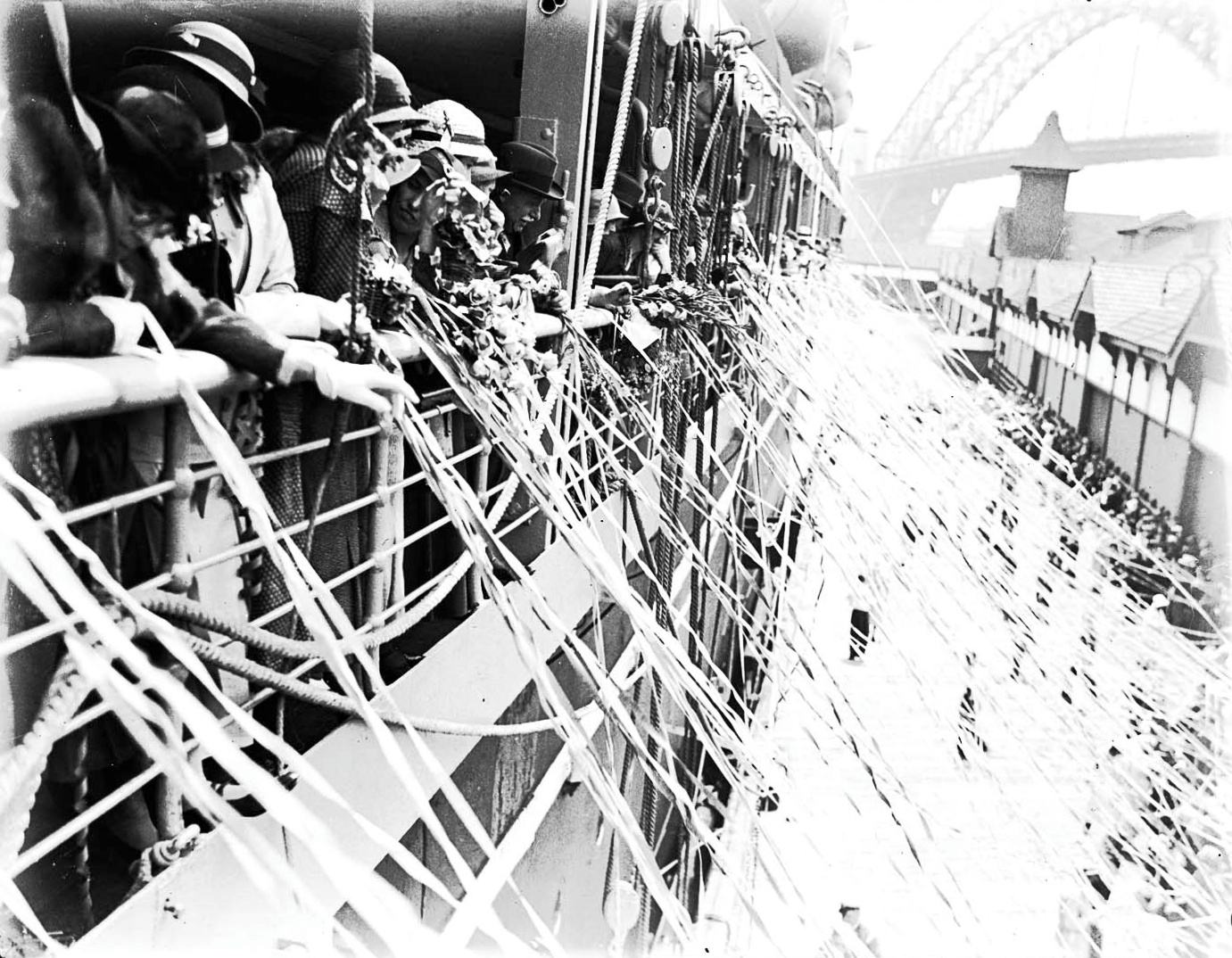
Passengers lining the rail of Cathay's deck holding farewell streamers in one of her departures from Circular Quay, Sydney, in the 1930s

Cathay began her maiden voyage from London to Sydney on 27 March 1925. Her regular route between Britain and Australia was via the Suez Canal. Within months of entering service, Cathay suffered a leak from her bunkers, causing heavy fuel oil to damage her cargo of meat. This led to a lengthy lawsuit.

In the 1930s P&O introduced larger and faster ships to its Australian route, starting with RMS Strathnaver in 1931 and RMS Strathaird in 1932. Cathay continued to serve the route, but from 1932 she additionally called at Bombay, and occasionally served P&O's Far East route.

In 1933 Cathay's tonnages were revised to 15,225 GRT and 8,746 NRT. In 1934 there was a worldwide reorganisation of merchant ship identification. Cathay's code letters KSHB were replaced with the new maritime call sign GCDF.

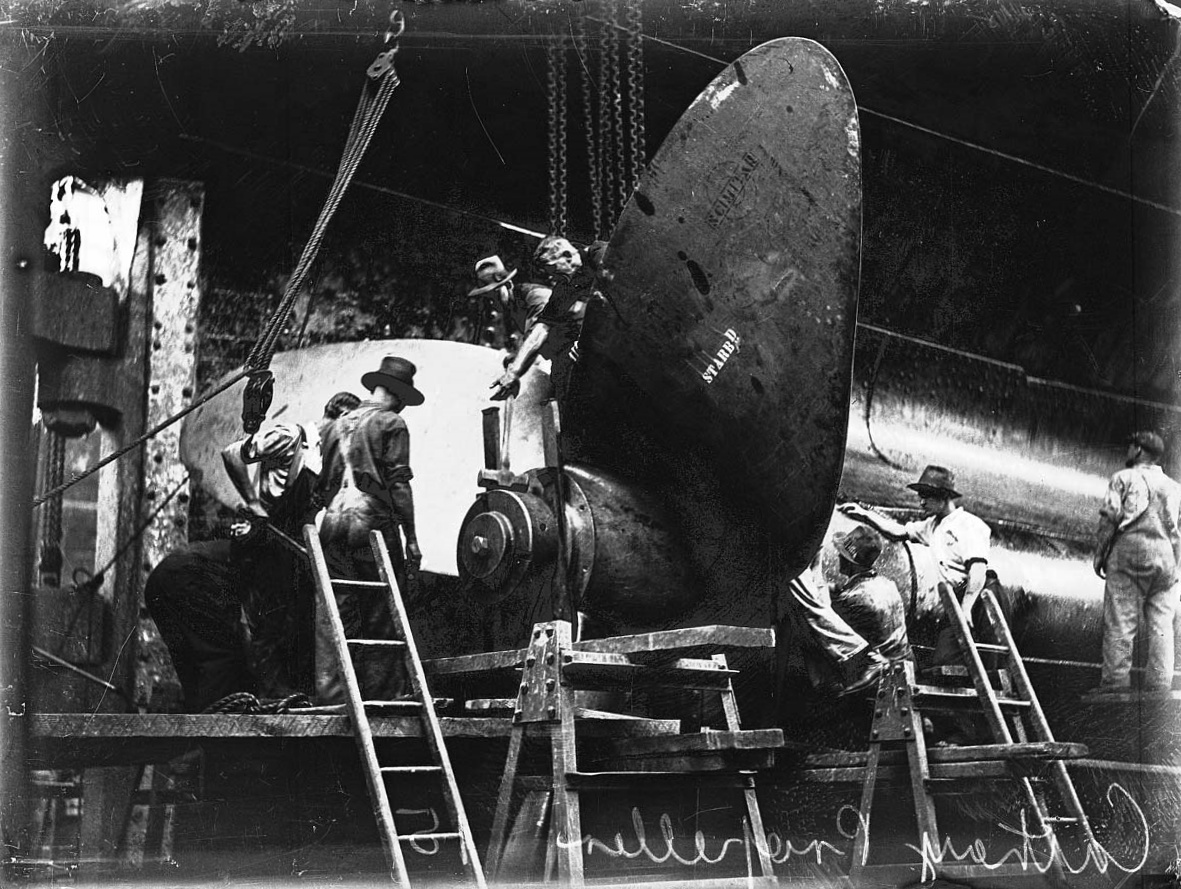
Fitting Cathay's new starboard propeller in Sutherland Dock, Sydney, in March 1934

On 14 December 1933 Cathay lost her starboard propeller while trying to make up time between Colombo and Fremantle. She waited in Australia until Strathnaver brought a new one from Britain. She was dry docked in Sutherland Dock at Cockatoo Island Dockyard for repairs, and she returned to service in March 1934.

By 1936 Cathay had been equipped with an echo sounding device.

== Armed merchant cruiser ==
On 25 August 1939 the Admiralty requisitioned Cathay. She was converted at Bombay into an armed merchant cruiser. Her dummy second funnel was removed. She was given a primary armament of eight BL 6-inch Mk XII guns. Her secondary armament included two QF 3-inch 20 cwt anti-aircraft guns. Her conversion was completed in October 1939, and she was commissioned as HMS Cathay.

From November 1939 Cathay patrolled in the Indian Ocean, calling at Bombay, Aden, Colombo, Trincomalee, Durban and Mombasa. Between June and August 1940 her duties also included escorting two convoys from Bombay to Suez.

In August 1940 Cathay transferred to the Atlantic. She undertook patrols, and escorted convoys between Freetown in Sierra Leone and either Liverpool or the Clyde.

=== Survivors from Anselm ===
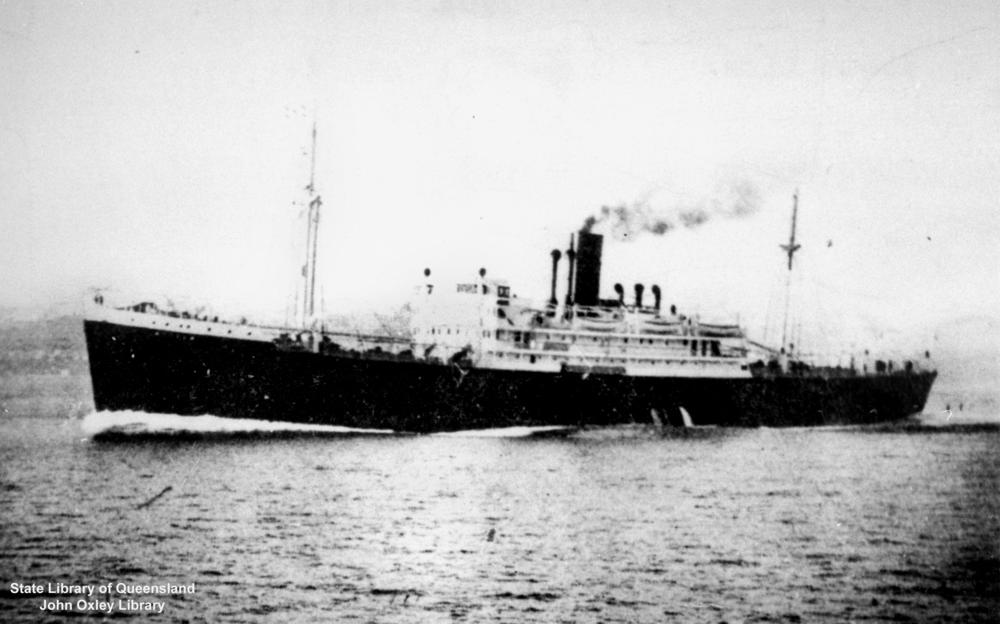
The troop ship Anselm

Cathay was one of the escorts of Convoy WS 9B, which left Liverpool on 29 June 1941. Also in the convoy was the troop ship Anselm, but shortly after departure the latter returned to port for repairs. Anselm later resumed her voyage, escorted by the survey vessel HMS Challenger and Flower-class corvettes Lavender, Petunia and Starwort.

On 4 July 1941 Cathay detached from convoy WS 9B to patrol. On 5 July the German submarine U-96 torpedoed Anselm in the South Atlantic, about 300 nautical miles (560 km) north of the Azores. She sank in 22 minutes, with the loss of 254 passengers and crew. 1,061 people survived, either in her lifeboats or rescued by her escorts, leaving the latter badly overloaded.

Cathay met the escorts, and 900 of the survivors were then transferred to her. She landed them at Freetown on 14 July.

Cathay's last convoy as an armed merchant cruiser escort was WS 12 from the Clyde to Freetown in October 1941. She then crossed the Atlantic from Freetown via Halifax, Nova Scotia, to New York, where she arrived on 14 October.

== Troop ship ==
On 5 February 1942 the Admiralty returned Cathay to P&O. The Bethlehem Steel Corporation refitted her in Brooklyn as a troop ship. She entered service again on 30 April 1942, leaving New York for Halifax, NS, where she joined eastbound Convoy NA 8. She carried 3,048 troops, and reached Belfast on 11 May.

On 31 May 1942 Cathay left the Clyde carrying 3,734 troops as part of Convoy WS 19P. The convoy called at Freetown and Cape Town, and Cathay continued with part of the convoy to Bombay. She returned via Durban, Cape Town and Freetown to the Clyde, where she arrived on 18 September.

=== Operation Torch ===
On 26 October 1942 Cathay left the Clyde in Convoy KMF 1. This was the landing force to launch Operation Torch, Allied invasion of French North Africa. On 7 November 1942 she landed troops west of Algiers.

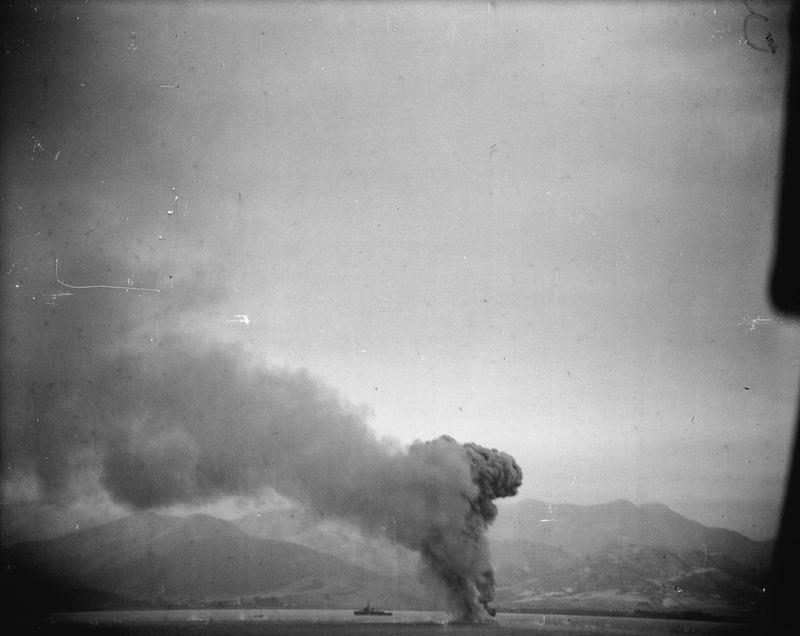
Cathay's ammunition explodes, 12 November 1942

At 1:30 pm on 11 November 1942, as Cathay was landing troops at Bougie, when German aircraft bombed her. The air raid killed one person. She was hit four times, and at 7:00 pm the order was given to abandon ship. At 10:00 pm a delayed action bomb exploded in her galley, starting a serious fire. At 7:00 am on 12 November, Cathay's ammunition exploded and blew off her stern. By 10:00 am she had capsized to starboard side and sunk.

All but one of Cathay's crew survived. At first some of the survivors were billeted aboard the British Indian SN Co ship Karanja, until enemy aircraft sank her too on 12 November. They were then transferred to P&O's Strathnaver.

== Bibliography ==
- Harnack, Edwin P (1930) [1903]. All About Ships & Shipping (4th ed.). London: Faber and Faber.
- "Vessels fitted with refrigerating appliances". Lloyd's Register of Shipping. Vol. I. London: Lloyd's Register of Shipping. 1926 – via Internet Archive.
- "Steamers & Motorships". Lloyd's Register of Shipping. Vol. II. London: Lloyd's Register of Shipping. 1927 – via Internet Archive.
- "Steamers & Motorships". Lloyd's Register of Shipping. Vol. II. London: Lloyd's Register of Shipping. 1934 – via Internet Archive.
- "Steamers & Motorships". Lloyd's Register of Shipping. Vol. II. London: Lloyd's Register of Shipping. 1936 – via Internet Archive.
- Osborne, Richard; Spong, Harry & Grover, Tom (2007). Armed Merchant Cruisers 1878–1945. Windsor, UK: World Warship Society. ISBN 978-0-9543310-8-5.
- "Losses Of P. & O. Liners". The Times. No. 50056. London. 1 February 1945. col. B, p. 2.
- Wilson, RM (1956). The Big Ships. London: Cassell & Co.
