= Heinrich Lehmann-Willenbrock =

German World War II U-boat captain (1911–1986)

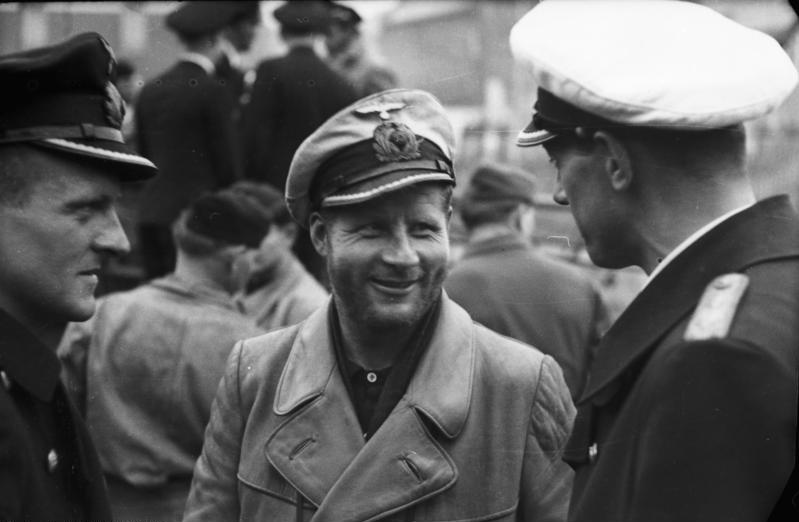
- Heinrich Lehmann-Willenbrock (center)
- Born: 11 December 1911; Bremen
- Died: 18 April 1986 (aged 74); Bremen
- Military career
- Allegiance: Weimar Republic; Nazi Germany
- Branch: Reichsmarine; Kriegsmarine
- Service years: 1931–1945
- Rank: Fregattenkapitän
- Nickname: Recke
- Units: SSS Horst Wessel; cruiser Karlsruhe; 7th U-boat Flotilla; 9th U-boat Flotilla; 11th U-boat Flotilla
- Commands: U-8; U-5; U-96; 9th U-boat Flotilla; U-256; 11th U-boat Flotilla
- Conflicts: World War II: Battle of the Atlantic; Operation Hartmut; Operation Weserübung; Battle for Brest
- Awards: Knight's Cross of the Iron Cross with Oak Leaves

Fregattenkapitän Heinrich Lehmann-Willenbrock (11 December 1911 – 18 April 1986) was a submarine commander in the Kriegsmarine of Nazi Germany during World War II. He commanded four U-boats, including U-96, a Type VIIC U-boat, which gained widespread recognition when one of its patrols was documented and publicized by an accompanying member of a propaganda company Lothar-Günther Buchheim. Lehmann-Willenbrock was awarded the Knight's Cross of the Iron Cross with Oak Leaves. The story of the U-96 was eventually made into a film called Das Boot, in which the captain was portrayed by Jürgen Prochnow. A mini-series was also later adapted.

After the war, Lehmann-Willenbrock became a merchant ship captain, serving as the first captain of Germany's nuclear freighter Otto Hahn.

== Early life and career ==
Lehmann-Willenbrock was born on 11 December 1911 in Bremen, in what was then the German Empire. He joined the Reichsmarine of the Weimar Republic in April 1931, as an Officer Candidate, and received his basic training with the Naval Infantry. He was promoted to Sea Cadet in October 1931 and attended Navy Officer Training from March 1932 to January 1933. He was then advanced to the rank of Midshipman and spent the next two years performing at-sea training. In August 1933, he was also appointed as navigation officer of the naval tender "Weser". He was advanced to Senior Midshipman in January 1935.

In April 1935, Lehmann-Willenbrock was commissioned as a Leutnant zur See (Lieutenant) and assigned as signals officer onboard the cruiser Karlsruhe. The following year, in September 1936, he was assigned for five months to the Naval Barracks at Glücksburg before receiving orders to report as Watch officer onboard the sailing vessel Horst Wessel. Lehmann-Willenbrock reported to the ship in February 1937, having received a promotion to Senior Lieutenant one month earlier. He served on the ship for twenty six months before applying to join the German Navy's submarine branch

== U-boat service ==
Lehmann-Willenbrock transferred to the U-boat arm of the German Navy in April 1939. Upon serving as an executive officer on U-8, he was promoted to captain and took command of U-5 in December 1939. His first patrol, which lasted 15 days, was along the coast of Norway during Operation Hartmut, the U-boat operation in support of the invasion of Norway.

Upon the return of U-5, Lehmann-Willenbrock was transferred to the newly commissioned U-96, a Type VIIC U-boat. During three patrols under Willenbrock's command, U-96 sank 125,580 tons of Allied shipping. In 1941, U-96 sank three British troop ships: Oropesa (16 January), Almeda Star (17 January) and Anselm (15 July), each with considerable loss of life. The seventh patrol was the approximate time that Lothar-Günther Buchheim boarded U-96 and documented the boat's operations in his book Das Boot.

Lehmann-Willenbrock left U-96 in March 1942 to be promoted to Korvettenkapitän and appointed commander of the 9th U-boat Flotilla, stationed in Brest. On 2 September 1944 he assumed command of U-256 and escaped the besieged Brest just a few days before the town's surrender. He reached Bergen, Norway, on 23 October. In Bergen he was appointed commander of the 11th U-boat Flotilla in December, and held the position until the German surrender in Norway on 9 May 1945.

During his patrols with U-96, Lehmann-Willenbrock was awarded with the Iron Cross 2nd Class, the Iron Cross 1st Class, the U-Boat War Badge, the Knight's Cross of the Iron Cross, and the Knight's Cross of the Iron Cross with Oak Leaves for his achievements. He sank 24 ships for 170,237 gross register tons (GRT), damaged two ships for 15,864 GRT and damaged one ship as a total loss for 8,888 GRT. A total of 1,272 people lost their lives.

== Awards ==
- Wehrmacht Long Service Award 4th Class (2 October 1936)
- Iron Cross (1939) 2nd Class (20 April 1940) & 1st Class (31 December 1940)
- U-boat War Badge (1939) (2 January 1941)
- Italian Croce di Guerra with Swords (1 November 1941)
- Knight's Cross of the Iron Cross with Oak Leaves
  - Knight's Cross on 26 February 1941 as Kapitänleutnant and commander of U-96
  - Oak Leaves on 31 December 1941 as Kapitänleutnant and commander of U-96
- Wound Badge (1939) in Black (8 May 1942)
- War Merit Cross 2nd Class with Swords (30 January 1944)
- U-boat Front Clasp in Bronze (19 October 1944)
- Cross of the Order of Merit of the Federal Republic of Germany

Military offices
| Preceded by Kapitänleutnant Wolf-Harro Stiebler | Commanding officer, U-8; 14 October 1939 – 30 November 1939 | Succeeded by Kapitänleutnant Georg-Heinz Michel |
| Preceded by Kapitänleutnant Günter Kutschmann | Commanding officer, U-5; 5 December 1939 – 11 August 1940 | Succeeded by Kapitänleutnant Herbert Opitz |
| First | Commanding officer, U-96; 14 September 1940 – 28 March 1942 | Succeeded by Kapitänleutnant Hans-Jürgen Hellriegel |
| Preceded by Kapitänleutnant Ernst-Günther Brischke | Commanding officer, U-256; 2 September 1944 – 18 October 1944 | Ship struck |
| Preceded by Kapitänleutnant Jürgen Oesten | Commander of the 9th U-boat Flotilla; May 1942 – September 1944 | Succeeded by disbanded |
| Preceded by Fregattenkapitän Hans Cohausz | Commander of the 11th U-boat Flotilla; December 1944 – May 1945 | Succeeded by disbanded |
