= German submarine U-8 (1935) =

German World War II submarine

Coordinates: 53°31′N 8°10′E

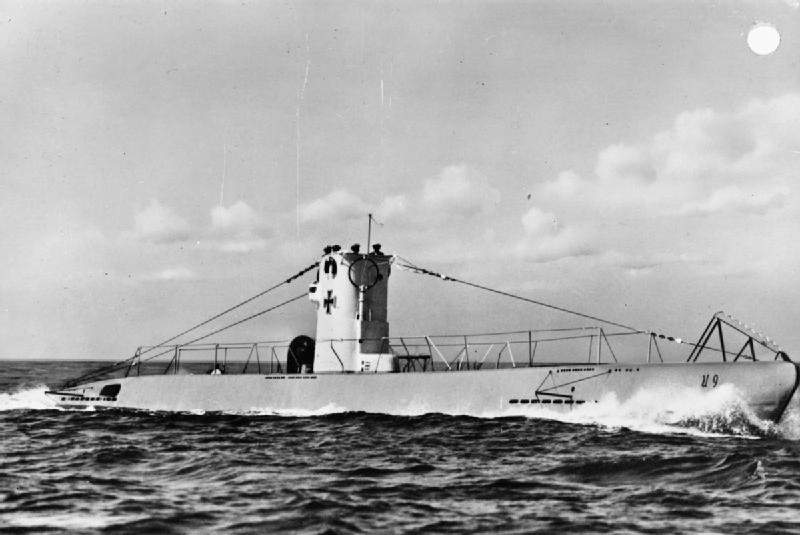
- U-9, a typical Type IIB boat

History

Nazi Germany
- Name: U-8
- Ordered: 20 July 1934
- Builder: Germaniawerft, Kiel
- Yard number: 542
- Laid down: 25 March 1935
- Launched: 16 July 1935
- Commissioned: 5 August 1935
- Fate: Scuttled on 5 May 1945, in the Raeder Lock at Wilhelmshaven.

General characteristics
- Class & type: Type IIB coastal submarine
- Displacement: 279 t (275 long tons) surfaced; 328 t (323 long tons) submerged
- Length: 42.70 m (140 ft 1 in) o/a; 27.80 m (91 ft 2 in) pressure hull
- Beam: 4.08 m (13 ft 5 in) (o/a); 4.00 m (13 ft 1 in) (pressure hull)
- Height: 8.60 m (28 ft 3 in)
- Draught: 3.90 m (12 ft 10 in)
- Installed power: 700 PS (510 kW; 690 bhp) (diesels); 410 PS (300 kW; 400 shp) (electric)
- Propulsion: 2 shafts; 2 × diesel engines; 2 × electric motors
- Speed: 13 knots (24 km/h; 15 mph) surfaced; 7 knots (13 km/h; 8.1 mph) submerged
- Range: 1,800 nmi (3,300 km; 2,100 mi) at 12 knots (22 km/h; 14 mph) surfaced; 35–43 nmi (65–80 km; 40–49 mi) at 4 knots (7.4 km/h; 4.6 mph) submerged
- Test depth: 80 m (260 ft)
- Complement: 3 officers, 22 men
- Armament: 3 × 53.3 cm (21 in) torpedo tubes; 5 × torpedoes or up to 12 TMA or 18 TMB mines; 1 × 2 cm (0.79 in) C/30 anti-aircraft gun

Service record
- Part of: U-boat School Flotilla; 1 September 1935 – 1 August 1939; 1 September 1939 – 3 January 1940; U-boat Defense School; 4 January – 12 April 1940; 1st U-boat Flotilla; 13 April – 30 June 1940; 24th U-boat Flotilla; 1 July – 17 December 1940; 22nd U-boat Flotilla; 18 December 1940 – 31 March 1945
- Identification codes: M 06 994
- Commanders: Kptlt. Harald Grosse; 13 August 1935 – 3 November 1936; Oblt.z.S. / Kptlt. Georg Peters; 24 June 1938 – 5 September 1939; Kptlt. Otto Schuhart; 2 September - 29 October 1938; Kptlt. Wolf-Harro Stiebler; 6 September - 13 October 1939; Kptlt. Heinrich Lehmann-Willenbrock; 14 October - 30 November 1939; Kptlt. Georg-Heinz Michel; 1 December 1939 - 4 May 1940; Kptlt. Eitel-Friedrich Kentrat; 5 May - 7 June 1940; Lt.z.S. Heinz Stein; 5 - 9 June 1940; Oblt.z.S. Walter Kell; 10 June - 6 July 1940; Oblt.z.S. Hans-Jürgen Zetzsche; 7 - 28 July 1940; Oblt.z.S. Walter Kell; 13 September - 17 December 1940; Kptlt. Heinrich Heinsohn; 18 December 1940 - 25 April 1941; Kptlt. Ulrich Borcherdt; 26 April - 22 May 1941; Oblt.z.S. Rolf Steinhaus; 23 May - 31 July 1941; Lt.z.S. / Oblt. Horst Deckert; 1 August 1941 - 16 May 1942; Oblt.z.S. Rudolf Hoffmann; 17 May 1942 - 15 March 1943; Oblt.z.S.d.R Alfred Werner; 16 March 1943 - 12 May 1944; Oblt.z.S. Jürgen Iversen; 13 May - 24 November 1944; Oblt.z.S. Jürgen Kriegshammer; 25 November 1944 - 31 March 1945
- Operations: 1 patrol: a. 19 May – 5 June 1940; b. 5–7 June 1940
- Victories: No ships sunk or damaged

The German submarine U-8 was a Type IIB U-boat of Nazi Germany's Kriegsmarine, based at Kiel during World War II. It was one of the smaller versions, and was first launched on 16 July 1935. Its first commander was Harald Grosse. U-8 would have 18 commanders over the course of its service, the last being Jürgen Kriegshammer.

== Design ==
German Type IIB submarines were enlarged versions of the original Type IIs. U-8 had a displacement of 279 tonnes (275 long tons) when at the surface and 328 tonnes (323 long tons) while submerged. Officially, the standard tonnage was 250 long tons (254 t), however. The U-boat had a total length of 42.70 m (140 ft 1 in), a pressure hull length of 28.20 m (92 ft 6 in), a beam of 4.08 m (13 ft 5 in), a height of 8.60 m (28 ft 3 in), and a draught of 3.90 m (12 ft 10 in). The submarine was powered by two MWM RS 127 S four-stroke, six-cylinder diesel engines of 700 metric horsepower (510 kW; 690 shp) for cruising, two Siemens-Schuckert PG VV 322/36 double-acting electric motors producing a total of 460 metric horsepower (340 kW; 450 shp) for use while submerged. She had two shafts and two 0.85 m (3 ft) propellers. The boat was capable of operating at depths of up to 80–150 metres (260–490 ft).

The submarine had a maximum surface speed of 12 knots (22 km/h; 14 mph) and a maximum submerged speed of 7 knots (13 km/h; 8.1 mph). When submerged, the boat could operate for 35–42 nautical miles (65–78 km; 40–48 mi) at 4 knots (7.4 km/h; 4.6 mph); when surfaced, she could travel 3,800 nautical miles (7,000 km; 4,400 mi) at 8 knots (15 km/h; 9.2 mph). U-8 was fitted with three 53.3 cm (21 in) torpedo tubes at the bow, five torpedoes or up to twelve Type A torpedo mines, and a 2 cm (0.79 in) anti-aircraft gun. The boat had a complement of twenty.

== Service history ==
U-8 was ordered on 20 July 1934, i.e. in violation of the Versailles Treaty, which denied Germany possession of submarines. The U-boat was not laid down until 25 March 1935, and launched on 16 July 1935, within weeks of the Anglo-German Naval Agreement, which granted Germany parity with the British Empire in submarines.

Commissioned on 5 August 1935 with Kapitänleutnant Harald Grosse in command, U-8 was used as a training boat until 31 March 1945, when the U-boat was decommissioned.

== Fate ==
U-8 was scuttled in the Raeder Lock at Wilhelmshaven on 5 May 1945.

== Bibliography ==
- Busch, Rainer; Röll, Hans-Joachim (1999). German U-boat commanders of World War II : a biographical dictionary. Translated by Brooks, Geoffrey. London, Annapolis, Md: Greenhill Books, Naval Institute Press. ISBN 1-55750-186-6.
- Gröner, Eric; Jung, Dieter; Maass, Martin (1991). German Warships 1815-1945: U-boats and Mine Warfare Vessels. Vol. 2. Translated by Thomas, Keith; Magowan, Rachel. London: Conway Maritime Press. ISBN 0-85177-593-4.
- Neistlé, Axel (2014). German U-Boat Losses during World War II: Details of Destruction (2 ed.). Havertown: Frontline Books (published 30 June 2014).
