= German submarine U-96 (1940) =

German World War II submarine

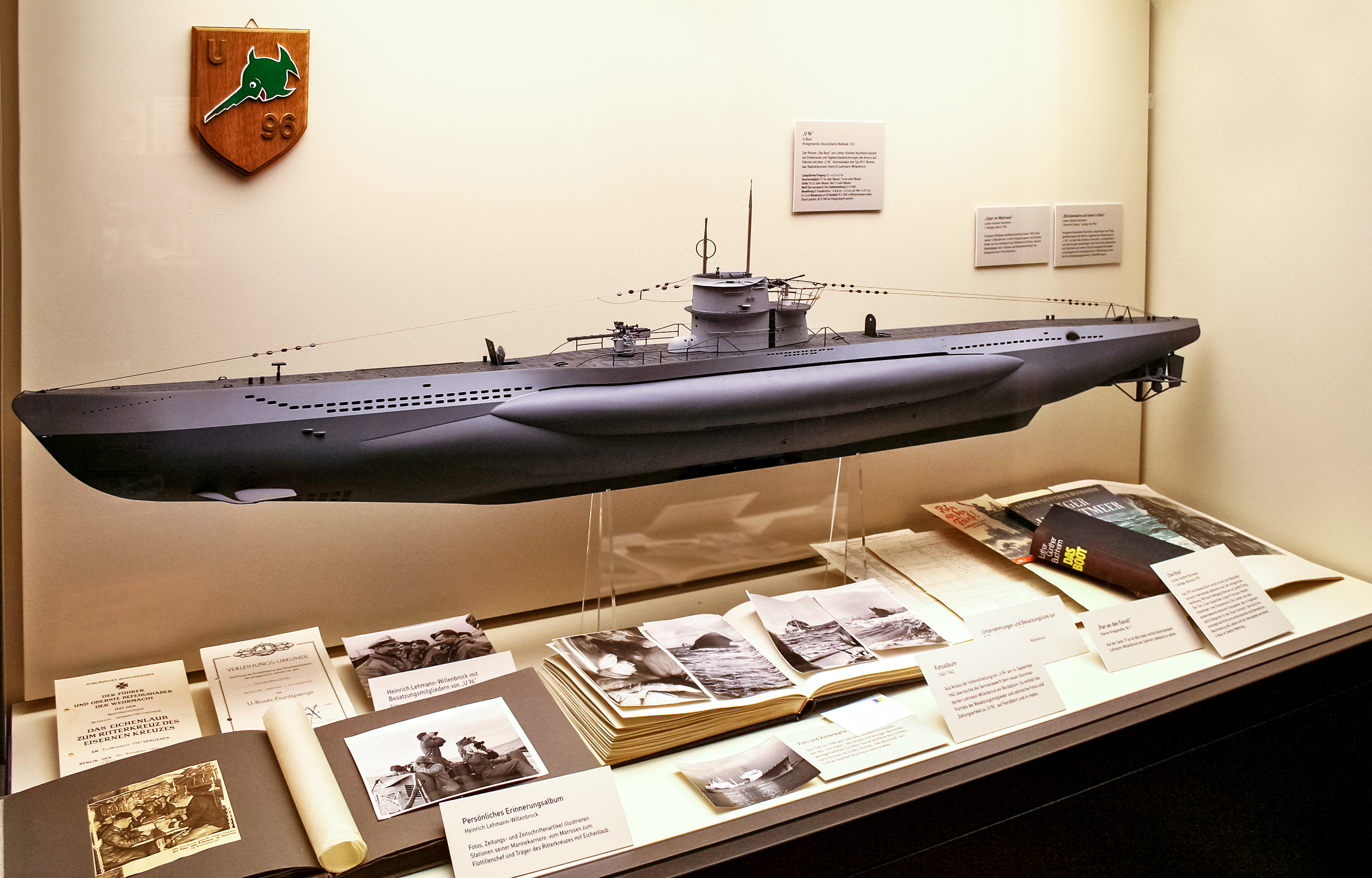
- Scale model of U-96

History

Nazi Germany
- Name: U-96
- Ordered: 30 May 1938
- Builder: Germaniawerft, Kiel
- Yard number: 601
- Laid down: 16 September 1939
- Launched: 1 August 1940
- Commissioned: 14 September 1940
- Decommissioned: 15 February 1945
- Fate: Sunk on 30 March 1945 at Wilhelmshaven by bombs during US air raid
- Badge

General characteristics
- Class & type: Type VIIC submarine
- Displacement: 769 tonnes (757 long tons) surfaced; 871 t (857 long tons) submerged
- Length: 67.10 m (220 ft 2 in) o/a; 50.50 m (165 ft 8 in) pressure hull
- Beam: 6.20 m (20 ft 4 in) o/a; 4.70 m (15 ft 5 in) pressure hull
- Height: 9.60 m (31 ft 6 in)
- Draught: 4.74 m (15 ft 7 in)
- Installed power: 2,800–3,200 PS (2,100–2,400 kW; 2,800–3,200 bhp) (diesels); 750 PS (550 kW; 740 shp) (electric)
- Propulsion: 2 shafts; 2 × diesel engines; 2 × electric motors
- Speed: 17.7 knots (32.8 km/h; 20.4 mph) surfaced; 7.6 knots (14.1 km/h; 8.7 mph) submerged
- Range: 8,500 nmi (15,700 km; 9,800 mi) at 10 knots (19 km/h; 12 mph) surfaced; 80 nmi (150 km; 92 mi) at 4 knots (7.4 km/h; 4.6 mph) submerged
- Test depth: 230 m (750 ft); Crush depth: 250–295 m (820–968 ft)
- Complement: 4 officers, 40–56 enlisted
- Armament: 5 × 53.3 cm (21 in) torpedo tubes (four bow, one stern); 14 × torpedoes or 26 TMA mines; 1 × 8.8 cm (3.46 in) deck gun (220 rounds); 1 x 2 cm (0.79 in) C/30 AA gun

Service record
- Part of: 7th U-boat Flotilla; 14 September 1940 – 31 March 1943; 24th U-boat Flotilla; 1 April 1943 - 30 June 1944; 22nd U-boat Flotilla; 1 July 1944 - 15 February 1945
- Identification codes: M 29 052
- Commanders: Kptlt. Heinrich Lehmann-Willenbrock; 14 September 1940 - 1 April 1942; Oblt.z.S. Hans-Jürgen Hellriegel; 28 March 1942 - 15 March 1943; Oblt.z.S. Wilhelm Peters; 16 March 1943 - 30 June 1944; Oblt.z.S. Horst Willner; February - June 1944; Oblt.z.S. Robert Rix; 1 July 1944 - 15 February 1945
- Operations: 11 patrols: 1st patrol: 4 – 29 December 1940; 2nd patrol: 9 – 22 January 1941; 3rd patrol: 30 January – 28 February 1941; 4th patrol: 12 April – 22 May 1941; 5th patrol: 19 June – 9 July 1941; 6th patrol: 2 August – 12 September 1941; 7th patrol: 27 October – 6 December 1941; 8th patrol: 31 January – 23 March 1942; 9th patrol: 23 April – 1 July 1942; 10th patrol: 24 August – 5 October 1942; 11th patrol: 26 December 1942 – 8 February 1943
- Victories: 27 merchant ships sunk (181,206 GRT); 1 merchant ship total loss (8,888 GRT); 4 merchant ships damaged (33,043 GRT)

German submarine U-96 was a Type VIIC U-boat of the German Navy (Kriegsmarine) during World War II. It was made famous after the war in Lothar-Günther Buchheim's 1973 bestselling novel Das Boot and the 1981 Oscar-nominated film adaptation of the same name, both based on his experience on the submarine as a war correspondent in 1941.

The keel was laid down on 16 September 1939, by Germaniawerft, of Kiel as yard number 601. She was commissioned on 14 September 1940, with Kapitänleutnant Heinrich Lehmann-Willenbrock in command. Lehmann-Willenbrock was relieved in March 1942 by Oberleutnant zur See Hans-Jürgen Hellriegel, who was relieved in turn in March 1943 by Oblt.z.S. Wilhelm Peters. In February 1944, Oblt.z.S. Horst Willner took command, turning the boat over to Oblt.z.S. Robert Rix in June of that year. Rix commanded the boat until 15 February 1945.

== Design ==
German Type VIIC submarines were preceded by the shorter Type VIIB submarines. U-96 had a displacement of 769 tonnes (757 long tons) when at the surface and 871 tonnes (857 long tons) while submerged. She had a total length of 67.10 m (220 ft 2 in), a pressure hull length of 50.50 m (165 ft 8 in), a beam of 6.20 m (20 ft 4 in), a height of 9.60 m (31 ft 6 in), and a draught of 4.74 m (15 ft 7 in). The submarine was powered by two Germaniawerft F46 four-stroke, six-cylinder supercharged diesel engines producing a total of 2,800 to 3,200 metric horsepower (2,060 to 2,350 kW; 2,760 to 3,160 shp) for use while surfaced, two AEG GU 460/8–27 double-acting electric motors producing a total of 750 metric horsepower (550 kW; 740 shp) for use while submerged. She had two shafts and two 1.23 m (4 ft) propellers. The boat was capable of operating at depths of up to 230 metres (750 ft).

The submarine had a maximum surface speed of 17.7 knots (32.8 km/h; 20.4 mph) and a maximum submerged speed of 7.6 knots (14.1 km/h; 8.7 mph). When submerged, the boat could operate for 80 nautical miles (150 km; 92 mi) at 4 knots (7.4 km/h; 4.6 mph); when surfaced, she could travel 8,500 nautical miles (15,700 km; 9,800 mi) at 10 knots (19 km/h; 12 mph). U-96 was fitted with five 53.3 cm (21 in) torpedo tubes (four fitted at the bow and one at the stern), fourteen torpedoes, one 8.8 cm (3.46 in) SK C/35 naval gun, 220 rounds, and a 2 cm (0.79 in) C/30 anti-aircraft gun. The boat had a complement of between forty-four and sixty.

== Service history ==
As part of the 7th U-boat Flotilla, stationed in Saint Nazaire, on the French Atlantic coast, U-96 conducted 11 patrols, sinking 27 ships totalling 181,206 gross register tons (GRT) and damaging four others totalling 33,043 GRT. She also caused one vessel of 8,888 GRT to be declared a total loss. The boat was a member of eleven wolfpacks. On 30 March 1945, U-96 was sunk by US bombs while in the submarine pens in Wilhelmshaven. In her entire career, she suffered no casualties to her crew. The boat was also known for her emblem, a green laughing sawfish. It became the symbol of the 9th Flotilla after Lehmann-Willenbrock took command in March 1942.

=== First patrol ===
U-96 departed Kiel on 4 December 1940 on her first patrol. Her route took her across the North Sea, through the gap between the Faroe and Shetland Islands and into the North Atlantic.

On 11 December, U-96 made contact with the scattered convoy HX 92 and attacked the British passenger ship Rotorua of 10,890 GRT, sinking her with a single torpedo launched at 15:12 in position 58°56′N 11°20′W. Most of her passengers and crew survived, her master, the convoy commodore and 21 others, however, perished. Later the same day, U-96 launched a torpedo at the Dutch merchant ship Towa of 5,419 GRT, hitting her amidships. The crippled ship did not immediately sink, so at 21:30 U-96 launched a second torpedo. After the second hit, the ship still stayed afloat, so the U-boat began shelling her half an hour later. The ship finally went under at 22:42 in position 58°50′N 10°10′W. The 37 crew members of Towa abandoned ship in three lifeboats, one of which capsized, drowning its occupants. 19 survivors were later picked up by an escort. A torpedo attack on Cardita of 8,237 GRT was unsuccessful.

In the early hours of 12 December, U-96 attacked the Swedish steamer Stureholm of 4,575 GRT, sinking her with a single torpedo launched at 01:56 in position 57°50′N 8°40′W. Two and a half hours later the un-escorted Belgian Macedonier was sighted and attacked with a single torpedo, which hit amidships, sinking her within 10 minutes in position 57°52′N 8°42′W. The crew had immediately abandoned ship and all but four out of 47 survived.

Two days later, on 14 December U-96 sank the British motor ship Western Prince of 10,926 GRT in position 59°32′N 17°47′W with two torpedoes. Later that day, at 21:02, U-96 fired at the British steamer Empire Razorbill, trying to stop her. After six rounds from her deck gun which resulted in three hits, U-96 abandoned the attack on the armed merchantman due to bad weather.

On 18 December, U-96 encountered the Dutch motor tanker Pendrecht and attacked her with a single torpedo at 16:15. The ship was hit astern but remained afloat. The crew, which had initially abandoned the ship, was able to re-board and sail her to Rothesay escorted by a British destroyer. U-96, which had lost contact during the night, remained in the general area, encountering a British battleship and her escorts, but could not attack.

After 26 days at sea, U-96 arrived in Lorient in occupied France on 29 December, having sunk five ships for a total of 37,037 GRT and damaging a further two ships for a total of 15,864 GRT.

=== Second patrol ===
On 9 January 1941, U-96 departed Lorient for her second war patrol. She returned to the waters west of Scotland, where she attacked the British SS Oropesa of 14,118 GRT early in the morning of 16 January. Three torpedoes were launched by U-96 in the space of two hours, finally sinking the ship in position 56°28′N 12°0′W at 06:16. One hundred and six passengers and crew perished, while 143 survivors were picked up by British destroyers.

The next day, U-96 encountered the un-escorted British passenger steamer Almeda Star of 14,936 GRT. A first torpedo was launched at 07:45, hitting the ship amidships, causing her to stop. A second torpedo hit the ship astern 20 minutes later, but still did not sink. Two more torpedoes were needed before Almeda Star sank in position 58°16′N 13°40′W, three minutes after the fourth and last torpedo was launched at 13:55. All passengers and crew, in total 360, were lost.

U-96 returned to base on 22 January 1941 and once more docked in Lorient after 14 days at sea, sinking two ships for a total of 29,054 GRT.

=== Third patrol ===
On 30 January 1941, U-96 left Lorient for her third war patrol in the North Atlantic. Two weeks into the patrol, she sighted a straggler from convoy HX 106 s, the British motor tanker Clea. The U-boat attacked shortly after 15:00 with a single torpedo, which hit Clea amidships, snapping her in half and setting the wreck on fire. The two halves were then sunk with artillery. Later the same day, another tanker, Arthur F. Corwin, of 10,516 GRT, was sighted. The tanker had already been hit by torpedoes from U-103, and was lagging behind the same convoy as Clea. U-96 launched two more torpedoes into the burning wreck, sinking her in position 60°25′N 17°11′W. All 59 crew members perished in the attack. In the morning, escorts of HX 106 spotted and attacked U-96 with four depth charges, but the U-boat escaped without damage.

At 02:27 on 18 February, the British Black Osprey of 5,589 GRT, part of HX 107 s, was attacked with a torpedo. A second torpedo sank the ship twelve minutes later. Black Osprey's crew of 36 abandoned ship in heavy weather, however, only eleven survivors were picked up two days later.

On 21 February a Focke Wulf "Condor" of I./KG 40 attacked and damaged a straggler from convoy OB 287, the 6,999 GRT Scottish Standard, killing five of her crew. The crew abandoned ship and 39 survivors were picked up by an escort, HMS Montgomery. On the next day, 22 February, U-96 came upon the abandoned tanker. Although there was a destroyer patrolling the area, U-96 was able to launch two torpedoes, sinking Scottish Standard in position 59°20′N 16°12′W. Following the second explosion, HMS Montgomery pursued the U-boat for five hours, dropping 37 depth charges without causing serious damage.

On 23 February 1941, U-96 made contact with convoy OB 288, and proceeded to attack in conjunction with U-69, U-73, U-95, and U-107 as well as the Italian submarine Michele Bianchi. The U-boats sank nine ships, including one escort, three of which were claimed by U-96.

The first, the British 5,457 GRT cargo ship Anglo-Peruvian, was mistaken for an auxiliary cruiser and attacked with two torpedoes at 23:27. The ship sank within three minutes after being hit with the loss of 29 of her crew in position 59°30′N 21°00′W. The 17 survivors were later picked up by a British merchant ship. Later the same night, at 01:16 on 24 February, the unescorted British SS Linaria of 3,385 GRT was attacked with a single torpedo. The ship sank 25 minutes after being hit by the torpedo at the stern. All 35 crew members were lost in the attack. An hour after Linaria was attacked, U-96 attacked the British SS Sirikishna of 5,458 GRT, hitting the ship amidships. Six hours later, U-96 launched a second torpedo at the wreck, that had been abandoned by the crew, which included the commodore of OB 288, Rear Admiral R.A.A. Plowden, DSO. There were no survivors.

After escaping the attack of an escort, HMS Churchill, U-96 made for port in St. Nazaire, France, where she arrived after 30 days at sea on 28 February, having sunk seven ships for a total of 45,391 GRT. Upon arrival the commander of U-96, Heinrich Lehmann-Willenbrock, was presented with the Knight's Cross of the Iron Cross, which he had been awarded two days before. The Wehrmachtbericht had announced on 25 February that Lehmann had sunk 55,600 tons on his last patrol, and a total of 125,580 tons of Allied shipping since taking command of U-96.

=== Fourth patrol ===
On 12 April 1941 U-96 set to sea again for her fourth war patrol. On 16 April, the U-boat made contact with convoy OB 309 and was immediately attacked by an escort, HMS Rockingham, resulting in some damage to the boat. On 28 April, U-96 encountered her sister U-95 in contact with convoy HX 121. At 19:25 U-96 launched three torpedoes against three tankers in the convoy. The first ship to be hit, Oilfield, a British motor tanker of 8,516 GRT, went up in flames upon being hit, all but eight of her crew of 55 perished in the attack. The second ship, the Norwegian tanker Caledonia, was hit in the engine room, killing seven crew members there. A further five crew members were killed when they drifted into the burning wreck of Oilfield nearby after jumping overboard. The rest of the crew survived when the rescue ship Zaafaran picked up 25 survivors in a lifeboat. The third ship sunk that day, the British steamship Port Hardy of 8,897 GRT, was hit accidentally when the third torpedo missed its target. Before the torpedo hit, U-96 was forced to submerge, as an escort, the Flower-class corvette HMS Gladiolus arrived on the scene. Port Hardy lost one crew member in the attack, while 97 passengers and crew were picked up by Zaafaran.

Shortly after 13:00 the next day, a slightly damaged U-96 was attacked by an aircraft, a Lockheed Hudson from No. 233 Squadron RAF, but the bombs did not cause any further damage. In the evening of 1 May, U-96 unsuccessfully attacked an unescorted freighter, before making contact with another convoy on 4 May. Contact was lost the next day, however. On 7 May, U-96 was spotted by a Short Sunderland shortly after noon, and over the course of two and a half hours, 32 bombs were dropped. Another air attack occurred a week later, on 14 May, when a four-engine aircraft dropped three bombs on the U-boat.

Early on 19 May, the British steamship Empire Ridge of 2,922 GRT, crossed U-96's path 90 nautical miles (170 km; 100 mi) west of Bloody Foreland (Ireland). Mistaking her for a 9000 GRT tanker, U-96 launched two torpedoes. Empire Ridge broke in half when the torpedoes hit, taking with her 31 of a crew of 33.

After 41 days at sea, U-96 returned to Saint Nazaire on 22 May, having sunk four ships for a total of 30,227 GRT.

=== Fifth patrol ===
The fifth war patrol started on 19 June 1941, when U-96 left Saint Nazaire for the North Atlantic again. Two weeks into the patrol, U-96 made contact with a small convoy. The boat was about 300 nautical miles (560 km; 350 mi) north of the Azores on 5 July 1941 when she found the survey vessel HMS Challenger leading an armed merchant cruiser (AMC) HMS Cathay and SS Anselm, a cargo and passenger liner of 5,954 GRT that had been converted into a troop ship. Also escorting the small convoy were three Flower-class corvettes: HMS Lavender, Petunia and Starwort. U-96 was under the impression that she had hit the survey ship and the AMC; instead, she had struck Anselm twice, sinking her and killing 254 people. Starwort's ASDIC was not working, but Lavender and Petunia counter-attacked with depth charges. The U-boat was seriously damaged and forced to curtail her patrol.

After 21 days at sea, U-96 arrived in Saint Nazaire, having sunk one ship of 5,954 GRT.

=== Sixth patrol ===
On 2 August 1941, U-96 left for her sixth patrol in the North Atlantic. On 12 August, the U-boat was part of group Greenland. Two weeks later, on 28 August, she joined group Prince-Elector. In early September, U-96 belonged to group Seawolf before returning to base. On 12 September she entered St.Nazaire after 42 days at sea, without attacking any ships.

=== Seventh patrol ===
On 27 October, U-96 left for her seventh patrol with journalist Lothar-Günther Buchheim aboard and joined group Stoßtrupp three days later. The next day, 31 October, the group made contact with convoy OS 10. U-96 launched four torpedoes at a long range, one of which struck the Dutch SS Bennekom. The ship went down half an hour after being hit, taking nine of her crew of 56 with her. Following the attack, the sloop HMS Lulworth arrived on the scene and forced U-96 under water with gun fire. The U-boat escaped the barrage of 27 depth charges unscathed. The next day, U-96 encountered two more of the escorts, HMS Gorleston and Verbena, but managed to escape again.

The U-boat spent November patrolling the North Atlantic as part of groups Störtebecker and Benecke, until secretly entering the neutral port of Vigo, Spain, and being resupplied by the interned German MV Bessel on 27 November. After leaving Vigo, U-96 made for the Strait of Gibraltar, with orders to enter the Mediterranean. However, late on 30 November the U-boat was spotted by a Fairey Swordfish of 812 Naval Air Squadron and heavily damaged by two bombs dropped by the aircraft. Unable to reach her destination, U-96 made for the port of Saint Nazaire. On the way she encountered the Spanish SS Cabo de Hornos, which returned from South America, after delivering a group of Jewish refugees to the Dutch colony of Curaçao, when Brazil denied them entry. When U-96's torpedo missed, the ship was stopped and her papers checked. On 6 December 1941, after 41 days at sea, U-96 returned to Saint Nazaire, having sunk one ship of 5,998 GRT.

=== Eighth patrol ===
The boat's eighth patrol saw success when she operated off the Canadian east coast. She sank Lake Osweya near Halifax on 20 February 1942. She was only 500 yd (460 m) from her target when the torpedo was launched.

She sank Torungen off Nova Scotia on 22 February and attacked Kars later the same day. The latter ship broke in two following the torpedo's impact. The bow section quickly sank, but the stern section was beached and declared a total loss.

The submarine's final victory this time out came on 9 March when she sank Tyr about 100 nautical miles (190 km; 120 mi) from Halifax.

=== Ninth and tenth patrols ===
For the ninth patrol, U-96 left St. Nazaire on 23 April 1942 and returned 73 days later, on 1 July without attacking anything.

On the tenth patrol, the boat damaged F. J. Wolfe on 10 September 1942 (although this ship was able to keep up with her convoy). U-96 also sank Sveve on the same day, as well as Elisabeth van Belgie. It also sank Deläes on the 11th.

=== Eleventh patrol ===
The boat's final operational patrol commenced with her departure from Saint Nazaire on 26 December 1942. Crossing the Atlantic for the last time, she then came back to the eastern side and after transferring a sick crew-member to U-163 on 3 January 1943, arrived at Königsberg (now Kaliningrad, Russia) on 8 February.

=== After active service ===
She spent most of the rest of the war as a training vessel. She was decommissioned on 15 February 1945 in Wilhelmshaven.

When US Eighth Air Force attacked Wilhelmshaven on 30 March 1945, U-96 was sunk in Hipper basin. The remains of the U-boat were broken up after the war.

== In popular culture ==
=== Books ===
During 1941, war correspondent Lothar-Günther Buchheim joined U-96 for her seventh patrol. His orders were to photograph and describe the U-boat in action for propaganda purposes. Over 5,000 photographs, most of them taken by Buchheim, survived the war. From his experiences, he wrote a short story, "Die Eichenlaubfahrt" (The Oak-Leaves Patrol) and a 1973 novel which was to become an international best-seller, Das Boot (The Boat), followed in 1976 by U-Boot-Krieg (U-boat War), a nonfiction chronicle of the voyage.

=== Film ===
In 1981 Wolfgang Petersen created the critically acclaimed film Das Boot based on Buchheim's novel of the same name with several alterations to the plot and characters. Both the novel and the film had a much darker ending than in reality, where the U-boat returns to port only to be destroyed during an air raid with many of her crew killed or wounded. In reality, U-96 survived war service, being decommissioned in February 1945 and converted into a training vessel. U-96 was sunk one month later in March by Allied bombs. The same replica of U-96 was used in Steven Spielberg's 1981 film Raiders of the Lost Ark, but has the number U-26, which in reality was a Type IA U-boat.

=== Video games ===
In 2019, Deep Water Studio released the video game UBOAT in early access. UBOAT gives the player command of U-96 during the Second World War.

UBOAT was officially released on August 4th, 2024, and was received positively.

U-96 is also featured as one of the five playable submarines in the video game Wolfpack released by Usurpator AP into early access in 2019.

The U-boat is also featured in the mobile game Azur Lane in an anthropomorphised form.

Toys

The Polish building block company Cobi released a 1:300 scale model containing 162 blocks and retailing at €19.99.

== Wolfpacks ==
U-96 took part in eleven wolfpacks:

- Hammer (5–12 August 1941)
- Grönland (12–27 August 1941)
- Kurfürst (28 August – 2 September 1941)
- Seewolf (2–10 September 1941)
- Stosstrupp (30 October – 4 November 1941), with Buchheim present on board
- Störtebecker (5–19 November 1941)
- Benecke (19–22 November 1941)
- Hecht (11 May – 18 June 1942)
- Stier (29 August – 2 September 1942)
- Vorwärts (3–25 September 1942)
- Jaguar (10–20 January 1943)

== Summary of raiding history ==
U-96 conducted eleven patrols, sinking 27 ships totalling 181,206 gross register tons (GRT) and damaging four others totalling 33,043 GRT. She also caused one vessel of 8,888 GRT to be declared a total loss.

Date	Ship	Nationality	Tonnage (GRT)	Convoy	Fate	Location	Deaths
11 December 1940	Rotorua	United Kingdom	10,890	HX 92	Sunk	58°56′N 11°20′W	22
11 December 1940	Towa	Netherlands	5,419	HX 92	Sunk	58°50′N 10°10′W	18
12 December 1940	Macedonier	Belgium	5,227	HX 92	Sunk	57°52′N 08°42′W	4
12 December 1940	Stureholm	Sweden	4,575	HX 92	Sunk	57°50′N 08°40′W	32
14 December 1940	Empire Razorbill	United Kingdom	5,118	OB 257	Damaged	59°31′N 13°15′W	0
14 December 1940	Western Prince	United Kingdom	10,926		Sunk	59°32′N 17°47′W	14
18 December 1940	Pendrecht	Netherlands	10,746	OB 259	Damaged	45°18′N 36°40′W	0
16 January 1941	Oropesa	United Kingdom	14,118		Sunk	56°28′N 12°00′W	106
17 January 1941	Almeda Star	United Kingdom	14,936		Sunk	58°16′N 13°40′W	360
13 February 1941	Arthur F. Corwin	United Kingdom	10,516	HX 106	Sunk	60°25′N 17°11′W	46
13 February 1941	Clea	United Kingdom	7,987	HX 106	Sunk	60°25′N 17°10′W	59
18 February 1941	Black Osprey	United Kingdom	5,589	HX 107	Sunk	61°30′N 18°10′W	25
22 February 1941	Scottish Standard	United Kingdom	6,999	OB 287	Sunk	59°20′N 16°12′W	5
23 February 1941	Anglo-Peruvian	United Kingdom	5,457	OB 288	Sunk	59°30′N 21°00′W	29
24 February 1941	Linaria	United Kingdom	3,385	OB 288	Sunk	61°00′N 25°00′W	34
24 February 1941	Sirikishna	United Kingdom	5,458	OB 288	Sunk	58°00′N 21°00′W	43
28 April 1941	Caledonia	Norway	9,892	HX 121	Sunk	60°03′N 16°10′W	12
28 April 1941	Oilfield	United Kingdom	8,516	HX 121	Sunk	60°05′N 17°00′W	47
28 April 1941	Port Hardy	United Kingdom	8,897	HX 121	Sunk	60°14′N 15°20′W	1
19 May 1941	Empire Ridge	United Kingdom	2,922	HG 61	Sunk	54°47′N 11°10′W	31
5 July 1941	Anselm	United Kingdom	5,954		Sunk	44°25′N 28°35′W	254
31 October 1941	Bennekom	Netherlands	5,998	OS 10	Sunk	51°20′N 23°40′W	8
19 February 1942	Empire Seal	United Kingdom	7,965		Sunk	43°14′N 64°45′W	1
20 February 1942	Lake Osweya	United States	2,398		Sunk	43°14′N 64°45′W	39
22 February 1942	Kars	United Kingdom	8,888	HX 175	Total Loss	44°15′N 63°25′W	50
22 February 1942	Torungen	Norway	1,948		Sunk	44°00′N 63°30′W	19
9 March 1942	Tyr	Norway	4,265		Sunk	43°40′N 61°10′W	13
10 September 1942	Elisabeth van Belgie	Belgium	4,241	ON 127	Sunk	51°30′N 28°25′W	1
10 September 1942	F.J. Wolfe	United Kingdom	12,190	ON 127	Damaged	51°30′N 28°25′W	0
10 September 1942	Sveve	Norway	6,313	ON 127	Sunk	51°28′N 28°30′W	0
11 September 1942	Delães	Portugal	415		Sunk	50°03′N 29°32′W	0
25 September 1942	New York *	United Kingdom	4,989	RB 1	Damaged	54°34′N 25°44′W	0

*Sunk the next day by U-91 with all hands lost.

== Gallery ==
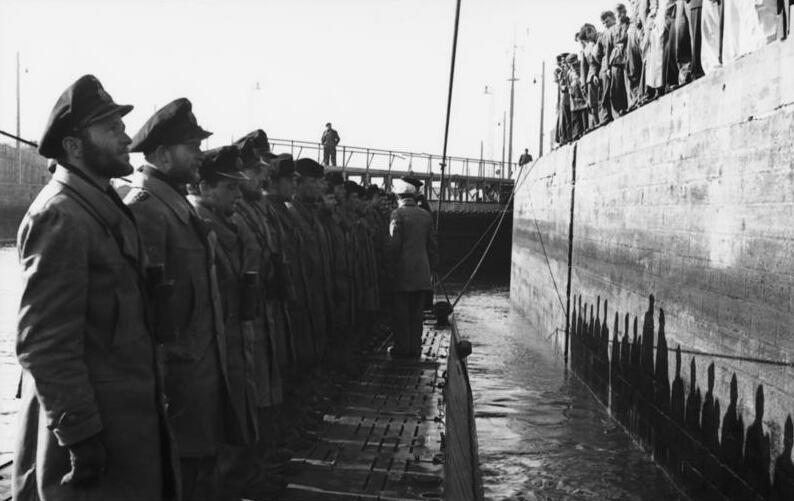
U-96 arrives in the port of Saint Nazaire

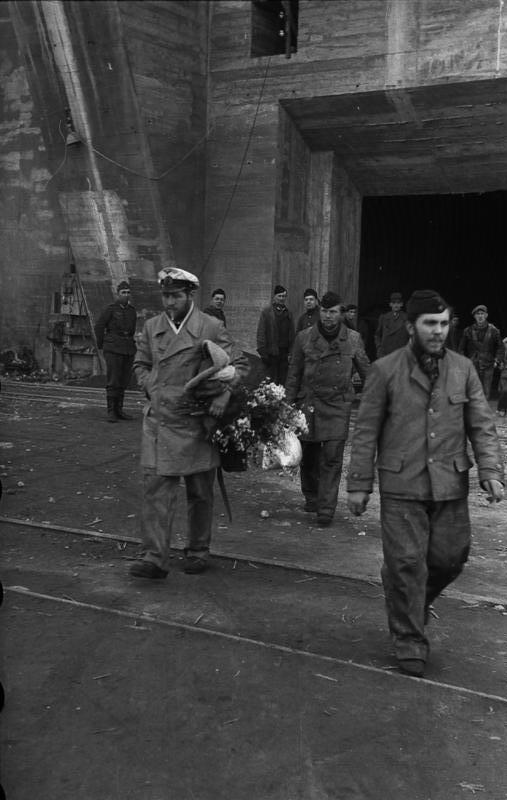
U-96 Crew disembarking after arrival. St. Nazaire's U-boat pens are in the background.

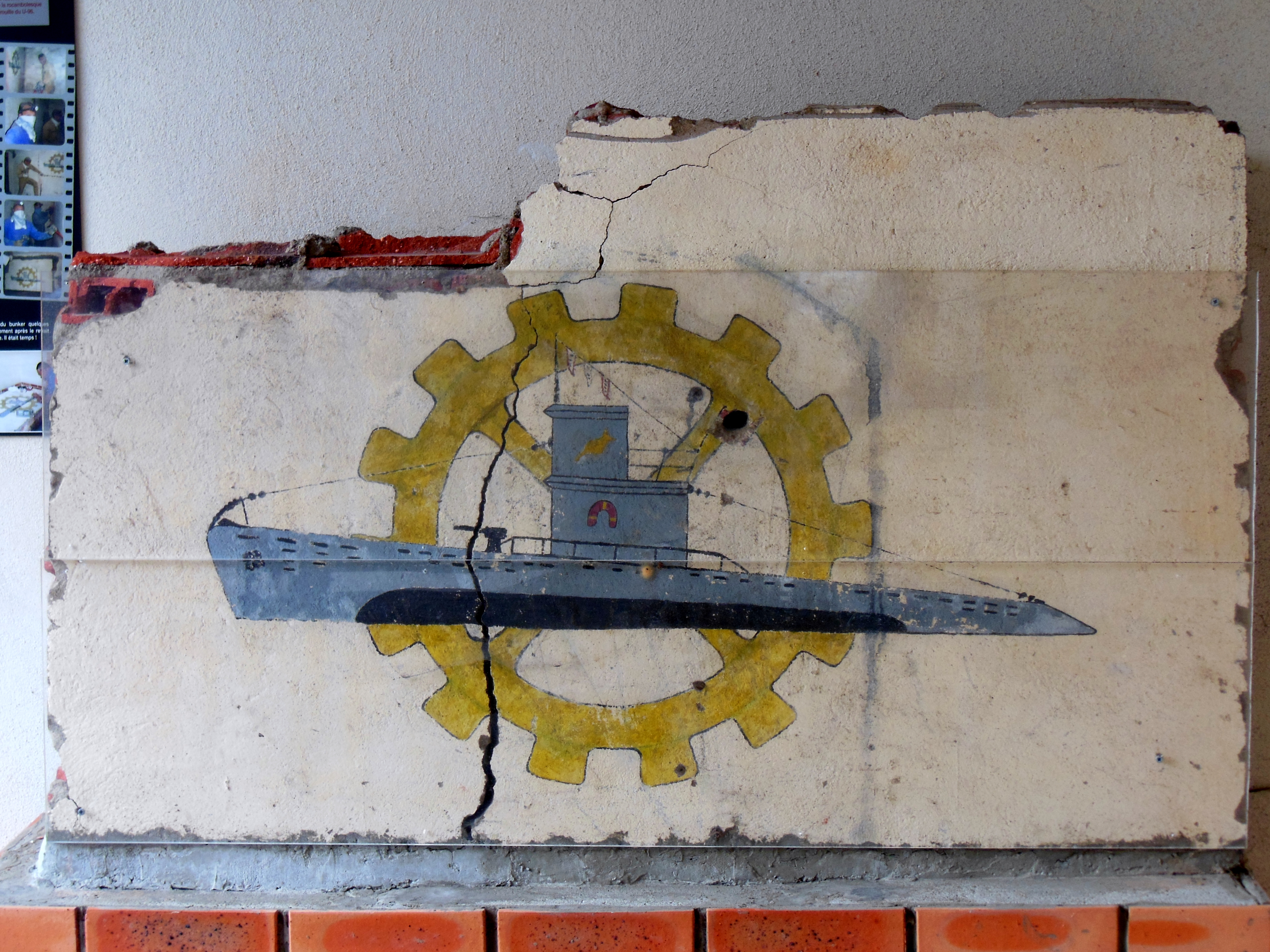
Fresco of U-96, outside the Grand Blockhaus Museum (Batz-sur-Mer, France)

== Bibliography ==
- Busch, Rainer; Röll, Hans-Joachim (1999). German U-boat commanders of World War II: a biographical dictionary. Translated by Brooks, Geoffrey. London, Annapolis, Md: Greenhill Books, Naval Institute Press. ISBN 1-55750-186-6.
- Busch, Rainer; Röll, Hans-Joachim (1999). Der U-Boot-Krieg, 1939-1945: Deutsche U-Boot-Verluste von September 1939 bis Mai 1945 [The U-Boat War, 1939-1945: German U-boat losses from September 1939 to May 1945] (in German). Vol. IV. Hamburg, Berlin, Bonn: Mittler. ISBN 3-8132-0514-2.
- Edwards, Bernard (1996). Dönitz and the Wolf Packs - The U-boats at War. Cassell Military Classics. pp. 66, 105, 108. ISBN 0-304-35203-9.
- Gröner, Erich; Jung, Dieter; Maass, Martin (1991). "U-boats and Mine Warfare Vessels". German Warships 1815–1945. Vol. 2. Translated by Thomas, Keith; Magowan, Rachel. London: Conway Maritime Press. ISBN 0-85177-593-4.
- Malcolm, Ian M (1 July 2013). Shipping Company Losses of the Second World War. History Press Limited. ISBN 978-0-7509-5371-9.
