= List of ships named Anselm =

Several cargo-passenger liners operated by Booth Line on their services to Brazilian Amazon ports have been named Anselm:

- SS Anselm (1882) - built by Andrew Leslie, Hebburn and scrapped in 1908 following a grounding in Honduras.
- SS Anselm (1905) - built by Workman, Clark and Company, Belfast and later the Argentinian Comodoro Rivadavia and Rio Santa Cruz. Suffered boiler explosion in 1952 and later scrapped.
- SS Anselm (1935) - built by William Denny and Brothers, Dumbarton. Converted to a troopship in 1940 and sunk by a submarine in 1941.
- MV Anselm (1961) - built by John Cockerill SA at Hoboken, Antwerp in 1950 as the Belgian Baudouinville, later Thysville. Purchased by Booth Line in 1961 but transferred to Blue Star Line as Iberia Star in 1963 and to Austasia Line as Australasia in 1965. Broken up in 1973.

== See also ==
- MV St Anselm
