= SS Anselm (1935) =

British turbine steamship sunk during World War II

Coordinates: 44°30′N 28°30′W

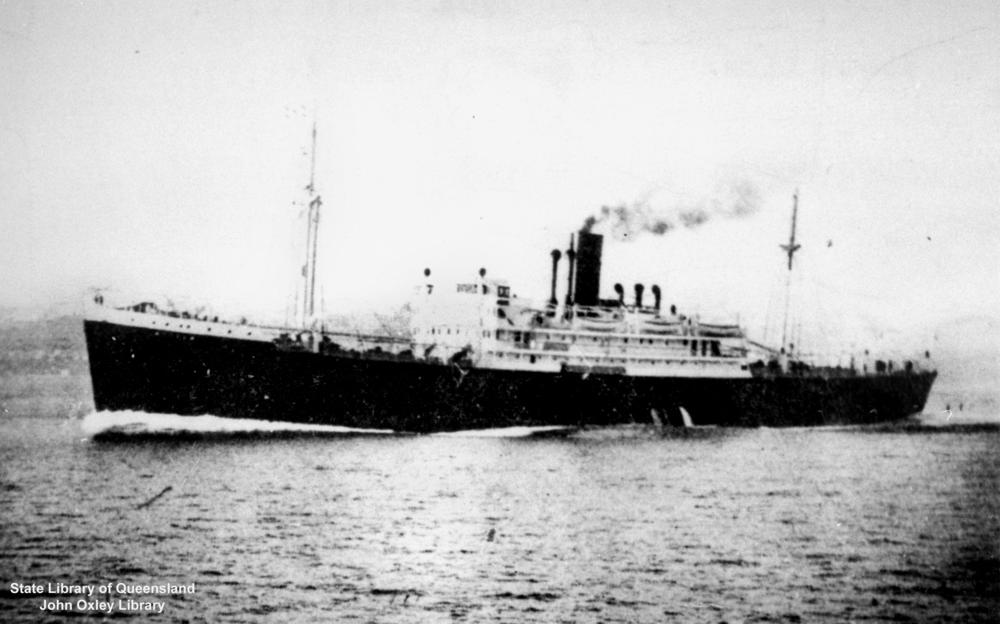
- Anselm under way

History

United Kingdom
- Name: Anselm
- Namesake: Anselm of Canterbury
- Owner: Booth Steamship Co
- Operator: Booth Steamship Co
- Port of registry: Liverpool
- Route: Liverpool – Brazil
- Builder: Wm Denny & Bros, Dumbarton
- Cost: £158,876
- Yard number: 1276
- Launched: 15 October 1935
- Completed: 17 December 1935
- Identification: UK official number 164275; call sign GYPF
- Fate: Sunk by torpedo, 5 July 1941

General characteristics
- Type: cargo & passenger liner; (1935–40); troop ship (1940–42)
- Tonnage: 5,954 GRT, 3,601 NRT
- Length: 412.3 ft (125.7 m)
- Beam: 55.7 ft (17.0 m)
- Draught: 25 ft 6 3/4 in (7.79 m)
- Depth: 25.8 ft (7.9 m)
- Installed power: 696 NHP
- Propulsion: 1 or 3 steam turbines; single screw
- Speed: 12 knots (22 km/h)
- Boats & landing craft carried: at least 6 lifeboats
- Capacity: Civilian service: 40 1st & 106 3rd class passengers; Wartime service: 500 troops
- Crew: 80
- Sensors & processing systems: wireless direction finding; echo sounding device
- Armament: DEMS

SS Anselm was a British turbine steamship of the Booth Steamship Company. She was built as a cargo and passenger liner in 1935 and requisitioned and converted into a troop ship in 1940. A German submarine sank her in 1941, killing 254 of those aboard.

== Building and civilian service ==
The Booth Steamship Company ordered Anselm for its passenger and cargo liner services between Liverpool and Brazil. William Denny and Brothers built her in its shipyard at Dumbarton on the Firth of Clyde in Scotland.

By the 1930s most British shipping companies specified oil fuel for new steamships because it was more economical. Booth, however, still specified coal because it was cheaper, and as the company's ships carried little cargo on outward voyages to South America and it considered it could afford larger coal bunkers. Anselm's bunkers had capacity for 980 long tons of coal.

Anselm had nine corrugated furnaces with a combined grate area of 176 square feet (16.4 m^{2}) heating three single-ended Howden-Johnson water-tube boilers with a combined heating surface of 7,704 square feet (715.7 m^{2}) that supplied steam at 250 lb_{f}/in^{2}.

Booth proposed a multiple-expansion steam reciprocating engine, with steam exhausted from the low-pressure cylinder then driving a low-pressure steam turbine for greater efficiency, as installed on its recent ships Boniface (1928), Hilary (1931), Clement (1934) and Crispin (1935). However, Denny persuaded Booth that it would be more economical to use pure turbine propulsion. Sources disagree as to whether she had three separate turbines or one three-stage Parsons turbine. Either way, her power was rated at 696 NHP and drove the shaft of her single propeller via single-reduction gearing.

Anselm was the last new ship ever built for Booth Line.

== War service ==
In November 1939 Anselm was in Liverpool and was due to sail to Pará via for Lisbon. Because of war conditions she was to leave with Convoy OB 32, which would then join Convoy OB 6. However, her sailing was cancelled and OB 32 left without her. Instead Anselm was requisitioned and quickly converted to carry about 500 troops. Her civilian passenger accommodation was assigned for officers; her holds were converted to accommodation for other ranks.

On 13 January 1940 she sailed from Freetown, Sierra Leone in Convoy SLF 16, which joined Convoy SL 16 and reached Liverpool on 27 January. On 25 June 1940 she left Freetown in Convoy SL 37, which reached Liverpool on 12 July. On 21 July 1940 she left Liverpool carrying 82 child evacuees to Halifax, Nova Scotia for the Children's Overseas Reception Board. In October 1940 she left Freetown in either Convoy SL 52 or Convoy SLF 52; the two combined at sea and on 10 November reached Liverpool.

On 18 December 1940 Anselm left Britain with Military Convoy WS 5A bound for Suez. On Christmas Day 1940 the German cruiser Admiral Hipper attacked Anselm, but Royal Navy escort cruisers drove Hipper off and the convoy dispersed. The convoy reformed on 27 December 1940 at Freetown and reached Suez on 16 February 1941. On her return voyage Anselm joined Convoy SL 74, which left Freetown on 10 May and reached Liverpool on 4 June. On 30 June Anselm left Liverpool again bound for Suez, sailing with Convoy WS 9B, which dispersed on 18 July.

== Final voyage and loss ==
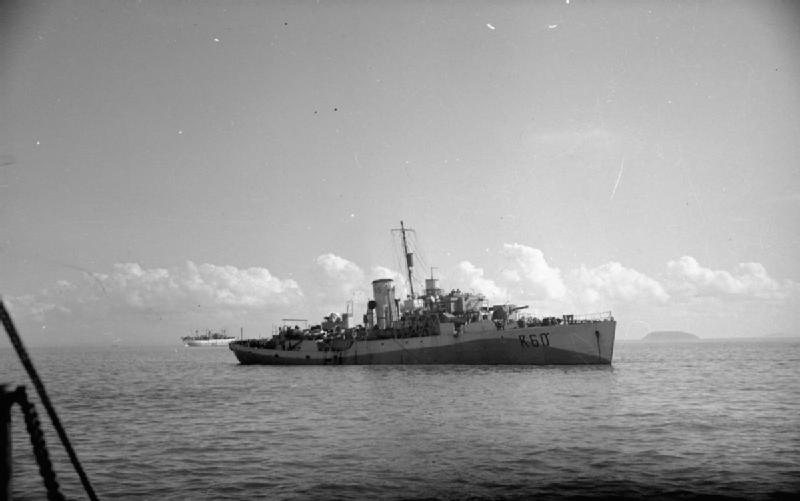
HMS Lavender was one of Anselm's escorts, and with HMS Petunia depth charged and damaged U-96

Toward the end of June 1941 Anselm left Britain for Freetown again. She was heavily overloaded with about 1,200 British Army, Royal Marines and Royal Air Force personnel: more than twice the 500 she had been converted to carry. There were 175 RAF personnel, posted to serve in the North African Campaign.

Some accounts say she sailed from Gourock on the Firth of Clyde; another that she left Loch Ewe in northwest Scotland on 26 June; another that she left Liverpool in England on 28 June. Sources agree that she was escorted by the survey vessel HMS Challenger and Flower-class corvettes Lavender, Petunia and Starwort. Some suggest that her escort also included the armed merchant cruiser Cathay.

In the early hours of 5 July 1941 Anselm and her escorts were in mid-Atlantic, proceeding south through fog about 300 nautical miles (560 km) north of the Azores. Challenger was leading the troop ship in line ahead; Starwort was stationed in line astern because her ASDIC was out of order. Lavender and Petunia were in screening positions ahead, either side of Challenger's bow. At about 0350 hours the fog cleared, and the convoy began to zigzag as evasive action against possible attack.

However, a Luftwaffe Focke-Wulf Fw 200 Condor patrol had reported the convoy's position and at 0426 hours the German Type VIIC submarine U-96, commanded by Kptlt Heinrich Lehmann-Willenbrock, fired a spread of four torpedoes at Challenger and Anselm. None hit Challenger but one struck Anselm's port side amidships, causing extensive damage and momentarily lifting the troop ship in the water. U-96 dived and the corvettes counter-attacked, Lavender firing six depth charges and Petunia firing 20. When the attack drew too close to the survivors it was broken off, but the submarine was seriously damaged and broke off her patrol to return to Saint-Nazaire submarine base in occupied France for repairs.

Anselm launched all her lifeboats except no. 6, which had been damaged by the explosion. Challenger had been 1/2 nautical mile (930 m) ahead but manoeuvred close to Anselm's port quarter and took off 60 or more survivors as the troop ship's bow settled in the water.

Officers from the passenger accommodation were able to reach the boat deck, but the impact caused extensive damage below decks, where collapsed overheads and wrecked ladders injured or trapped many of the men in one of the converted holds. One survivor states that officers got away in boats from Anselm's stern without waiting to help their men.

=== Cecil Pugh, GC ===
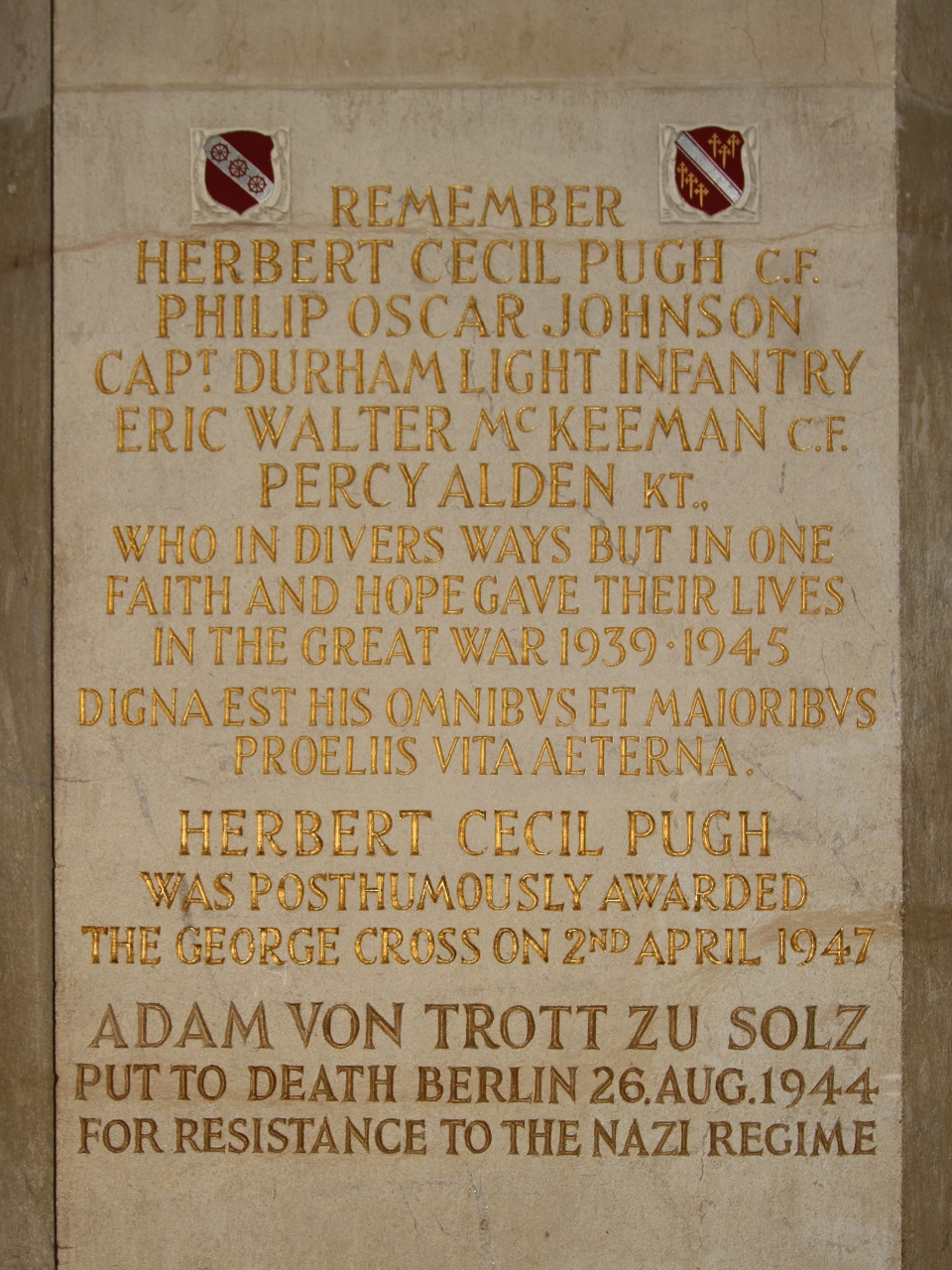
Inscription in the chapel of Mansfield College, Oxford in memory of alumni including Cecil Pugh

One officer who stayed aboard to the end was an Air Force chaplain lately of RAF Bridgnorth, Squadron Leader Cecil Pugh, who

"seemed to be everywhere at once, doing his best to comfort the injured, helping with the boats and rafts... and visiting the different lower sections where men were quartered. When he learned that a number of injured airmen were trapped in the damaged hold, he insisted on being lowered into it with a rope. Everyone demurred because the hold was below the water line and already the decks were awash and to go down was to go to certain death. He simply explained that he must be where his men were."

The ship sank 22 minutes after being hit, and four crew and about 250 troops were killed. Pugh went down with the ship, and in 1947 was posthumously awarded the George Cross.

=== Survivors ===
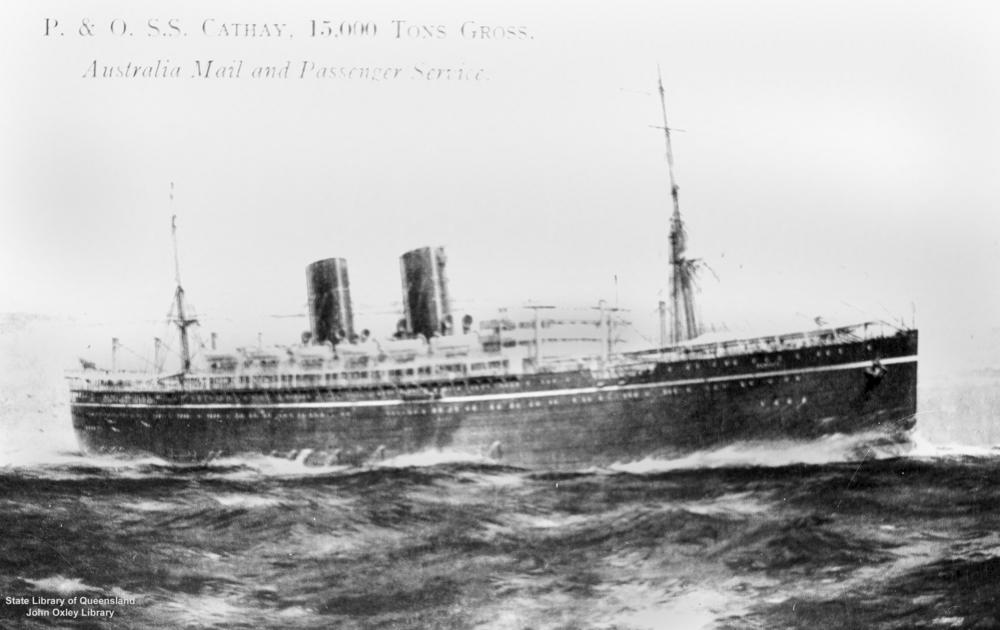
The armed merchant cruiser HMS Cathay took survivors from Anselm's overloaded escorts and landed them at Freetown

Most men aboard, including the majority of other ranks, did survive. Anselm's Master, Andrew Elliot, 92 of her crew, three DEMS gunners and 965 troops were rescued. Many were at first in the water, but were picked up by Challenger, Starwort or the ship's own lifeboats and rafts.

One leading aircraftman, Wilfrid Marten, recalled being in the sea for a few hours and being "near death's door" before he was rescued by a lifeboat. An officer in the boat then ordered him to row, but was silenced by a Naval rating or petty officer who threatened to throw the officer over the side.

Most of the survivors in the boats and rafts were transferred to the escort ships, ascending the sides by scramble nets. This left Challenger and the corvettes badly overloaded, so the survivors were transferred again to HMS Cathay which landed them at Freetown. The escorts may have missed one lifeboat, as one survivor reports that after the sinking he spent 18 days in a boat with neither food nor water.

== See also ==
- List of ships built by William Denny and Brothers

== Sources ==
- Blair, Clay (1996). Hitler's U-Boat War. Vol. 1: The Hunters, 1939–1942. New York: Random House. ISBN 0394588398.
- Darling, Ian (2009). "8: The Corporal's Ring". Amazing Airmen: Canadian Flyers in the Second World War. Toronto: Dundurn Press. pp. 97–105. ISBN 978-1-55488-424-7.
- Fethney, Michael (1990). The Absurd and the Brave: CORB, The True Account of the British Government's World War II Evacuation of Children Overseas. Lewes: The Book Guild. p. 60. ISBN 0863324479.
- John, AH (1959). A Liverpool Merchant House. London: George Allen & Unwin Ltd.
- "Steamers and Motorships". Lloyd's Register (PDF). Vol. II. London: Lloyd's Register. 1937 – via Southampton City Council.
