= SS Oropesa (1919) =

British ocean liner sunk during World War II

Coordinates: 56°17′N 12°00′W

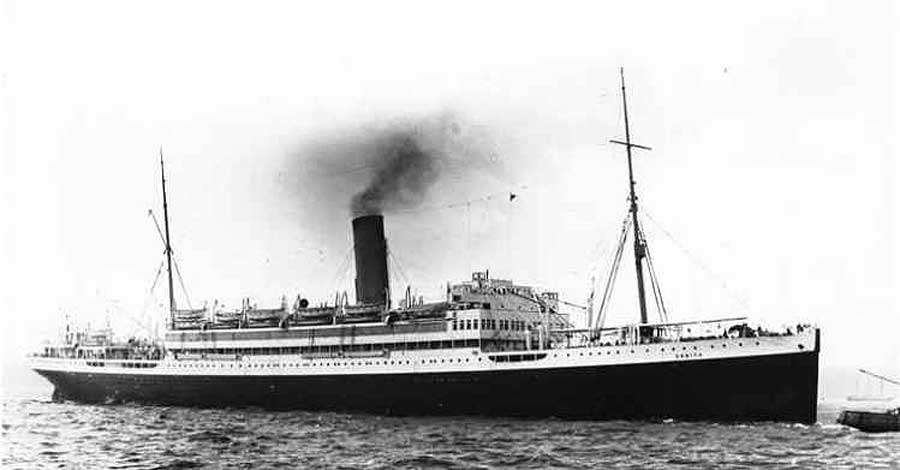
- Oropesa

History

United Kingdom
- Name: Oropesa
- Namesake: Either of two Oropesa Districts in Peru
- Owner: Pacific Steam Navigation Company
- Port of registry: Liverpool
- Builder: Cammell Laird, Birkenhead
- Yard number: 835
- Launched: 9 December 1919
- Maiden voyage: 4 September 1920
- Identification: UK official number 32485; Code letters KGRJ (1920–33); Call sign GDLP (1934–41)
- Fate: Sunk by torpedo, 16 January 1941

General characteristics
- Tonnage: 14,075 GRT; tonnage under deck 11,915; 8,608 NRT
- Length: 530 ft (160 m)
- Beam: 66.3 ft (20.2 m)
- Draught: 34 ft 3 1/2 in (10.45 m)
- Depth: 41.2 ft (12.6 m)
- Installed power: 1,647 NHP
- Propulsion: 6 Steam turbines, twin Propeller
- Speed: 14 knots (26 km/h)
- Capacity: 141 1st class; 131 2nd class; 360 3rd class
- Sensors & processing systems: Direction finding equipment
- Armament: DEMS

SS Oropesa was a British steam turbine ocean liner of the Pacific Steam Navigation Company (PSNC). She was built on Merseyside in 1920 and operated between Liverpool and South America. In 1941 the German submarine U-96 sank her in the Western Approaches, killing 106 people aboard.

== Building and civilian service ==
Cammell Laird built Oropesa at Birkenhead, launching her on 9 December 1919 and completing her in September 1920.

She was built as a coal-burner, with 32 corrugated furnaces with a combined grate area of 644 square feet (60 m^{2}) that heated four double ended boilers with a combined heating surface of 25,000 square feet (2,300 m^{2}). They supplied steam at 190 lb_{f}/in^{2} to six turbines with a combined rating of 1,647 NHP. They drove her twin propeller shafts via single reduction gearing, giving her a cruising speed of 14 knots (26 km/h).

Oropesa's maiden voyage began from Liverpool on 4 September 1920, taking her to Rio de Janeiro in Brazil and Buenos Aires in Argentina.

In May 1921 PSNC chartered Oropesa to Royal Mail Lines, for whom she worked the Hamburg – Southampton – New York route. She reverted to her owners in November 1922.

In 1924 PSNC had Oropesa converted to oil fuel, which is a more efficient fuel and takes less bunker space. In 1927 the company transferred her to the route between Liverpool and Valparaíso in Chile.

In January 1931 Oropesa took Edward, Prince of Wales and his brother Prince George to South America. She was then laid up at Dartmouth, Devon from October 1931 until 1937.

== War service ==
In September 1939 Oropesa was requisitioned as a troop ship. However, she spent the next 16 months carrying general cargo and passengers.

On 27 September carrying general cargo she left Liverpool with Convoy OB 11: an outward-bound convoy which then dispersed in the North Atlantic. On 2 December 1939 Oropesa left Halifax, Nova Scotia with Convoy HXF 11 bound for Liverpool. The next day, about 70 nautical miles (130 km) out of port she and the steam turbine cargo liner Manchester Regiment collided. 50 of the latter's crew were transferred to Oropesa and Manchester Regiment was taken in tow, but the cargo ship foundered and sank with a number of deaths. Oropesa returned the survivors to Halifax. On 12 January 1940 carrying general cargo Oropesa left Halifax again, this time with Convoy HXF 16, reaching Dover on 24 January.

On 3 March 1940 Oropesa left Liverpool with Convoy OB 103. Two days later, on 5 March, OB 103 joined Convoy OG 21F, which was bound for Gibraltar. Further out at sea Oropesa left OG 21F and continued independently to Bermuda. On 7 May carrying general cargo Oropesa left Bermuda with Convoy BHX 41, which joined Convoy HX 41 at sea on 13 May. HX 41 reached Liverpool on 23 May.

On 15 June 1940 carrying general cargo Oropesa left Liverpool with Convoy OB 168. Two days later, on 17 June, OB 168 formed Convoy OG 34F, which was bound for Gibraltar. Further out at sea Oropesa left OG 34F and continued independently to Panama. She returned with another general cargo, sailing independently as far as Bermuda. On 27 August she left Bermuda with Convoy BHX 69, which joined Convoy HX 69 at sea on 1 September. HX 69 reached Liverpool on 12 September.

Oropesa's next destination was Suez in Egypt. In June Italy had entered the War and France had surrendered. This made the Mediterranean unsafe for Allied ships, so thereafter nearly all Allied merchant shipping to the Near East and the Indian Ocean went via the South Atlantic and around the Cape of Good Hope. On 3 October 1940 Oropesa left Liverpool with Convoy WS 3A, which reached Cape Town, South Africa on 27 October. On 29 October she continued from Cape Town with Convoy WS 3, which reached Suez on 16 November.

== Final voyage and sinking ==
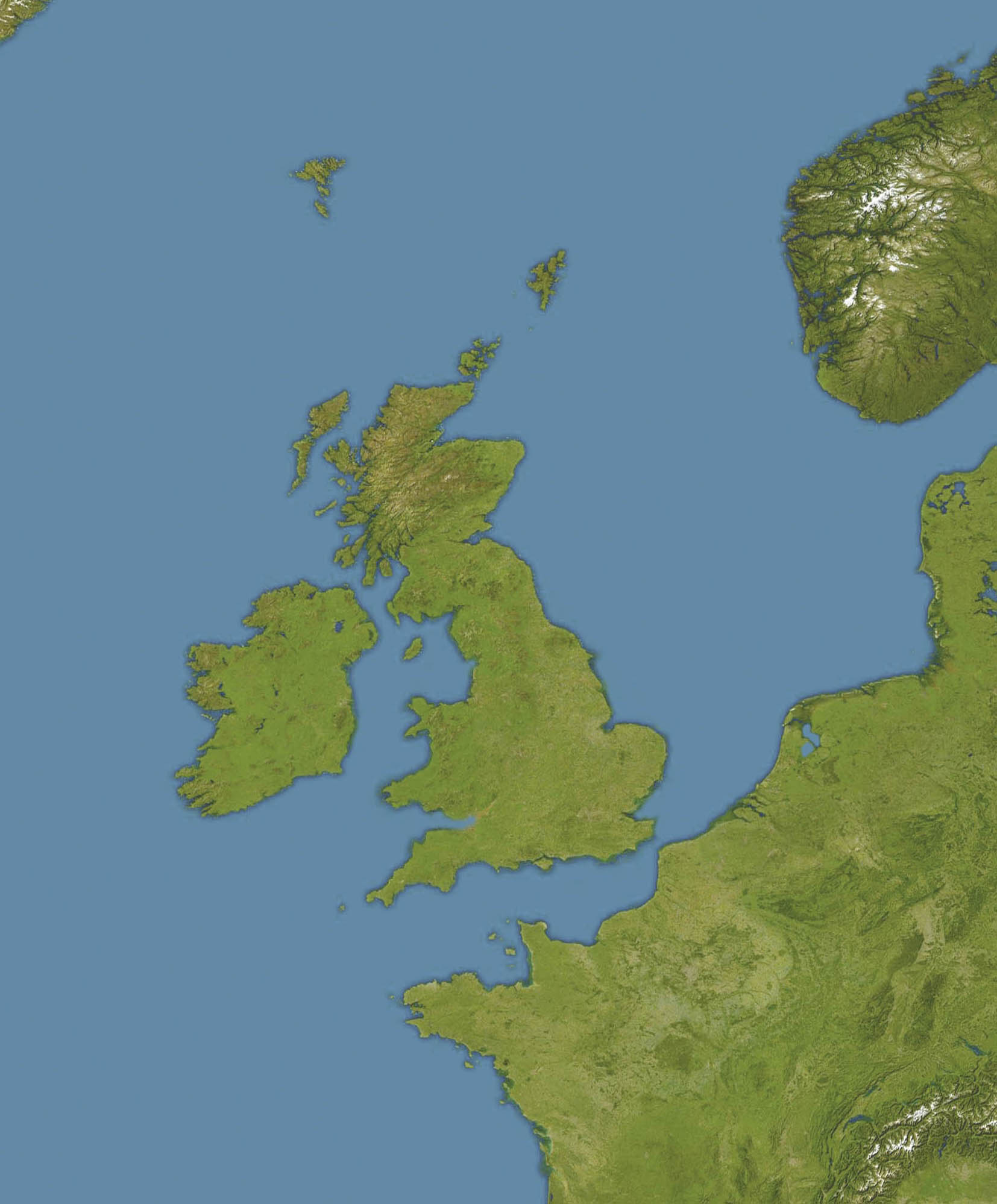
Approximate position of Oropesa's wreck

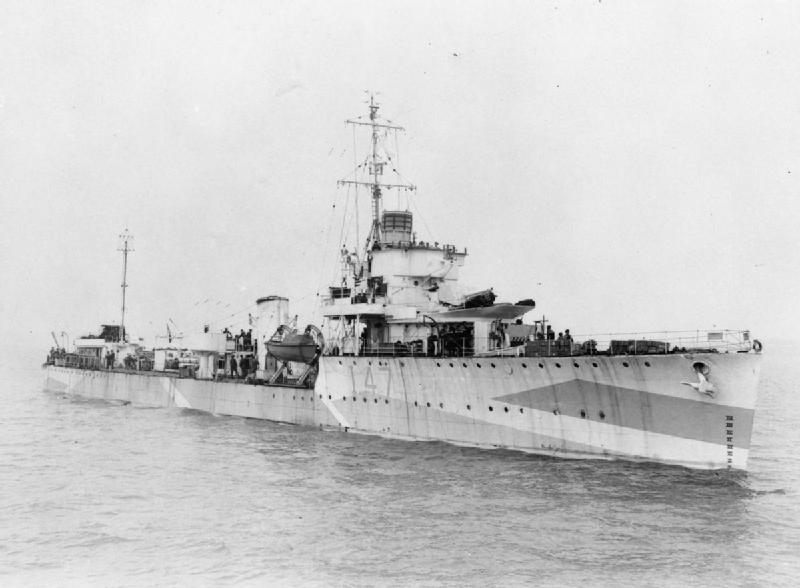
The destroyer HMS Westcott, which with two Royal Navy tugs rescued 143 survivors

Oropesa left Suez on 30 November with Convoy BS 9A, which dispersed off Aden on 5 December. On 12 December 1940 Oropesa left Mombasa in Kenya, calling at Beira, Mozambique, on 19 December and Cape Town on Christmas Day.

On 16 January 1941 at 03:56 hrs Oropesa was southeast of Rockall in the Western Approaches when the German Type VIIC submarine U-96, commanded by Kptlt. Heinrich Lehmann-Willenbrock, hit her in the stern with one G7a torpedo. Oropesa did not sink immediately, so U-96 waited and at 04:40 hrs fired another torpedo, but that malfunctioned and went in circles. U-96 fired again at 05:03 and 05:59 hrs, this time hitting Oropesa beneath her bridge and amidships. The liner capsized and sank at 06:16 hrs.

The Master, Harry Croft, 98 crew, a DEMS gunner and six passengers were killed. The Royal Navy tugs HMS Superman and HMS Tenacity and anti-submarine destroyer HMS Westcott rescued 109 crew, one DEMS gunner and 33 passengers and landed them at Liverpool.

U-96 had been at the scene for more than two hours, but escaped before Westcott could detect her. The next morning the submarine struck in the Western Approaches again, sinking SS Almeda Star and killing all 360 people aboard.

== Sources ==
- Harnack, Edwin P (1938) [1903]. All About Ships & Shipping (7th ed.). London: Faber and Faber. p. 557.
- Murfin, David (2020). "The Mobile Naval Base". In Jordan, John (ed.). Warship 2020. Oxford, UK: Osprey. pp. 188–192. ISBN 978-1-4728-4071-4.
