= 2023 Cleveland, Texas shooting =

Mass shooting in Texas, U.S.

- Location: 30°21′43.2″N 95°11′4.6″W; San Jacinto County, Texas, U.S.
- Date: April 28, 2023; 11:31 p.m. (CDT; UTC–5)
- Attack type: Mass shooting, mass murder
- Weapon: Anderson Manufacturing AR-15 style pistol
- Deaths: 5
- Injuries: 0
- Perpetrator: Francisco Oropeza
- Motive: Neighbor dispute

On April 28, 2023, a mass shooting occurred northwest of Cleveland in San Jacinto County, Texas, United States, resulting in the deaths of five people, including a nine-year-old boy. The perpetrator was a neighbor, who was captured on May 2 after a four-day manhunt.

== Shooting ==
The incident took place on April 28, 2023, at approximately 11:31 p.m. CDT, following a call made to the San Jacinto County Sheriff's Office in East Texas regarding harassment. At least 10 people were present at the location of the incident, (Note: The Sheriff's Office has said that there were 10 people at the home, a relative of one of those at the house said that there were 12 people, the Associated Press has reported 15 people, and the Houston Chronicle has reported 16 people.) which was situated 6 miles (9.7 km) northwest of the town of Cleveland, 45 miles (72 km) northeast of central Houston.

According to police reports, the suspect was asked by a neighbor, whose baby was trying to sleep, to stop firing his AR-15 rifle in his yard. The suspect allegedly refused, stating that it was his yard. The neighbor then warned the suspect that he would call the police. The suspect subsequently retrieved the rifle from his home, entered the neighbor's residence, and began shooting. Four of the victims died at the scene, while the nine-year-old boy was transported to a hospital by a fire department ambulance, where he was later pronounced dead. Three other minors were found covered in blood but were physically unharmed and were transported to a hospital.

According to a sheriff, all the victims were shot above the neck at close range, "almost execution style".

The shooting occurred eight days prior to an outlet mall shooting in Allen, Texas, leading to increased scrutiny of gun laws in Texas.

== Manhunt ==
Following the shooting, a manhunt was launched to capture the suspect, who was identified as 38-year-old Francisco Oropeza (born 1985). The authorities discovered a Mexican consulate card and footage from a Ring doorbell camera to identify him. The Houston field office of the Federal Bureau of Investigation (FBI) was involved in the search, and a judge issued an arrest warrant for Oropeza with a $5 million bond. The police believed that he had fled the scene on foot or by bicycle. Initially, the search radius was limited to 2-mile (3.2 km) but was later expanded to at least 10 mi (16 km) away. To help in the arrest of the suspect, a reward of $80,000 was offered, which increased to $100,000 prior to the suspect being arrested.

Initially, an FBI release had incorrect details, including a different spelling of Oropeza's name and a photo of an unrelated person. However, it was later updated with the correct information. Oropeza is a Mexican national who was born and raised in Mexico. According to ABC News, he had been deported from the United States back to Mexico four times between March 2009 and July 2016. Oropeza had previously lived in Montgomery County. Since 2020, Oropeza had been living in Cleveland, where he had a history of shooting outside in his yard. He also had a prior arrest record, mainly for DWI, according to records from the Texas Department of Public Safety.

On May 1, the suspect was briefly spotted on foot near Texas State Highway 105, causing schools in the area to be closed. On May 2, Oropeza was found in Cut and Shoot, Texas, 6 miles (9.7 km) east of Conroe and 18 miles (29 km) away from the scene of the shooting. The authorities found him hiding in a closet underneath someone's laundry in a house associated with one of his family members. They received a tip through the FBI's tip line at 5:15 p.m. CDT, and he was apprehended at 6:30 p.m. CDT. U.S. Marshals, Texas Department of Public Safety, and BORTAC apprehended him.

Shortly after Oropeza's arrest, Oropeza's wife, 52-year-old Divimara Lamar Nava (born August 1970), was taken into custody without incident in connection with the shooting at the arrest scene. Police believe Nava provided Oropeza with food and clothes during the manhunt, as well as allegedly plotting an escape to Mexico with Oropeza.

== Guilty plea and sentence ==
On January 29, 2025, Oropeza pleaded guilty in the shooting and was sentenced to life in prison without parole. Oropeza is now imprisoned in the John B. Connally Unit.

== Victims ==
The five people who died were all Honduran citizens and have been identified as Sonia Argentina Guzmán (25), Diana Velázquez Alvarado (21), Julisa Molina Rivera (31), José Jonathan Casárez (18), and Daniel Enrique Laso-Guzmán (9).

Texas Governor Greg Abbott faced criticism for referring to the victims as "illegal immigrants," which was widely perceived as insensitive since authorities had not officially disclosed their immigration status. The husband of one of the victims stated that his wife was a permanent resident of the United States.

== See also ==
- List of mass shootings in the United States in 2023
- List of shootings in Texas
