= Oropesa District =

Oropesa District may refer to:

- Oropesa District, Antabamba, Peru
- Oropesa District, Quispicanchi, Peru

== See also ==
- Oropeza Province, Bolivia
