= HMS Petunia (K79) =

Flower-class corvette

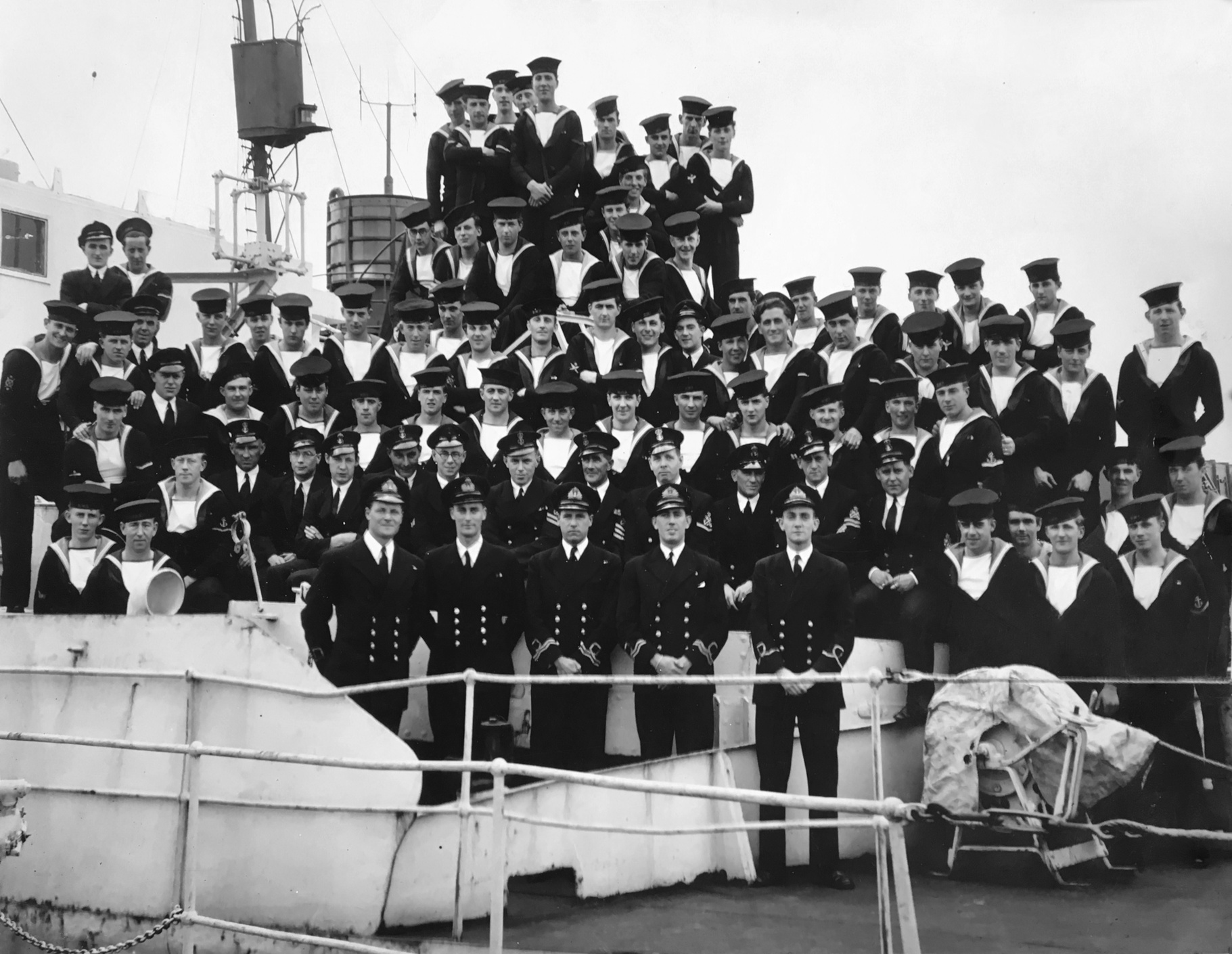
- Crew of HMS Petunia

History

United Kingdom
- Name: Petunia
- Namesake: Petunia
- Builder: Henry Robb, Leith
- Laid down: 4 December 1939
- Launched: 19 September 1940
- Commissioned: 13 January 1941
- Decommissioned: January 1946
- Identification: Pennant number: K79
- Fate: Sold to Republic of China, January 1946

Republic of China
- Name: Fu Bo; (伏波)
- Acquired: 12 January 1946
- Fate: Sunk in collision, 19 March 1947

General characteristics
- Class & type: Flower-class corvette
- Displacement: 925 long tons
- Length: 205 ft (62 m) o/a
- Beam: 33 ft (10 m)
- Draught: 11 ft 6 in (3.51 m)
- Propulsion: 1 × 4-cycle triple-expansion reciprocating steam engine; 2 × fire tube Scotch boilers; Single shaft; 2,750 ihp (2,050 kW)
- Speed: 16 kn (30 km/h)
- Range: 3,500 nmi (6,500 km) at 12 kn (22 km/h)
- Complement: 85
- Sensors & processing systems: 1 × SW1C or 2C radar; 1 × Type 123A or Type 127DV sonar
- Armament: 1 × BL 4-inch (101.6 mm) Mk.IX gun; 2 × Vickers .50 cal machine gun (twin); 2 × Lewis .303 cal machine gun (twin); 2 × Mk.II Depth charge throwers; 2 × Depth charge rails with 40 depth charges

HMS Petunia (K79) was a Flower-class corvette that served in the Royal Navy and was built by Henry Robb in 1940. She was named after the petunia, a flowering plant. Commissioned in 1940, rammed and sold to the Chinese Nationalist Government and renamed ROCS Fu Bo.

== Design and description ==
In early 1939, with the risk of war with Nazi Germany increasing, it was clear to the Royal Navy that it needed more escort ships to counter the threat from Kriegsmarine U-boats. One particular concern was the need to protect shipping off the east coast of Britain. What was needed was something larger and faster than trawlers, but still cheap enough to be built in large numbers, preferably at small merchant shipyards, as larger yards were already busy. To meet this requirement, the Smiths Dock Company of Middlesbrough, a specialist in the design and build of fishing vessels, offered a development of its 700-ton, 16 knots (18 mph; 30 km/h) whale catcher Southern Pride. They were intended as small convoy escort ships that could be produced quickly and cheaply in large numbers. Despite naval planners' intentions that they be deployed for coastal convoys, their long range meant that they became the mainstay of Mid-Ocean Escort Force convoy protection during the first half of the war. The original Flowers had the standard RN layout, consisting of a raised forecastle, a well deck, then the bridge or wheelhouse, and a continuous deck running aft. The crew quarters were in the foc'sle while the galley was at the rear, making for poor messing arrangements.

The modified Flowers saw the forecastle extended aft past the bridge to the aft end of the funnel, a variation known as the "long forecastle" design. Apart from providing a very useful space where the whole crew could gather out of the weather, the added weight improved the ships' stability and speed and was retroactively applied to a number of the original Flower-class vessels during the mid and latter years of the war.

== Construction and career ==
Petunia was one of 30 Flower-class corvettes ordered on 31 August 1939, and was laid down by Henry Robb at their shipyard at Leith on 4 December 1939 and launched on 19 September 1940. The ship was completed on 13 January 1941.

=== Service in the Royal Navy ===
On 5 July 1941, Petunia, together with the corvettes Lavender and Starwort and the Admiralty yacht (and former survey ship) Challenger, were escorting the troopship Anselm Gibraltar when the convoy was spotted by the German submarine U-96. U-96 torpedoed Anselm, which sank in 22 minutes, killing 254 of the 1200 troops aboard, while Petunia and Lavender counter-attacked with accurate depth charge attacks, which were broken off when the corvettes came close to Anselm's survivors in the water. The attacks badly damaged U-96 which was forced to prematurely return to France. In August 1941, Petunia transferred to the 8th Escort Group, escorting convoys to and from the mid Atlantic, where the convoys transferred to Canada-based escorts. Petunia was still part of the 8th Escort Group, based at Londonderry Port in Northern Ireland, in October 1941.

Petunia was transferred to Freetown, Sierra Leone in April 1942. On 5 October 1942, Petunia was on passage to Freetown, when the corvette was spotted by the Italian submarine Barbarigo, which fired a spread of five torpedoes at Petunia. A lookout aboard the corvette spotted the wakes of the torpedoes, allowing Petunia to avoid them. Petunia then dropped a depth charge to discourage further attack, the noise of which causing Barbarogo's captain, Enzo Grossi, to claim to have sunk his target, which he identified as a Mississippi-class battleship. On 11 October, Petunia rescued 126 survivors from the merchant ships Glendene and Agapenor, and took them to safety in Freetown. (Glendane had been sunk by U-125 on 8 October, with survivors picked up by Agapenor on 10 October, and then Agapenor was sunk by U-87 on 11 October). Later that month, Petunia commanded the escort for Convoy SL 125, with four corvettes tasked with protecting 42 merchant ships. The convoy came under heavy attack by German submarines from 25 October. While at first the escort managed to drive the attacks off, from the night of 27 October, the U-boats began to breach the defences, and by the time that increased air cover caused the attacks to be called off on 1 November, twelve merchant ships had been sunk. Throughout 1943, Petunia remained based in Freetown, being recorded as part of the 40th Escort Group in August that year. On 2 November 1943, Convoy SL 139 left Freetown, joining up with Convoy MKS 30 off Gibraltar on 14 November, with Petunia forming part of the escort for this very large (66 merchant ships) combined convoy. The Germans deployed large numbers of submarines against the convoy, in three patrol lines, but the heavy escort beat the attacks off, with three U-boats (U-211, U-536 and U-538) sunk, with one merchant ship sunk and one damaged by German air attack, and one sloop (Chanticleer) damaged by a German torpedo and later deemed not worth repairing. In December 1943, Petunia returned to the United Kingdom.

Petunia then joined Western Approaches Command, escorting convoys in the Western Approaches until May 1944. Petunia was then allocated to the forces preparing for the Invasion of France, and on 6 June, together with the corvettes Clarkia and Pink, the trawler Northern Foam and a Motor Launch, escorted assault convoy J.15, with 12 LSTs to Juno Beach for the landings.

=== Service in the Republic of China Navy ===
After the surrender of Nazi Germany, Petunia was nominated to be put into the reserve fleet and later put on the disposal list after the surrender of Japan in 1945. On 12 January 1946, she was sold to the Chinese Nationalist Government as ROCS Fu Bo.

On 19 March 1947, Fu Bo collided with the steamship Haimin at the Wuqiuyu lighthouse outside the mouth of Meizhou Bay, Fujian Province, sinking the corvette. The search and rescue operation took an hour to save the drowning people. At dawn, the steamship stopped the search and left for the Xiamen Naval Base Command, Xiamen to report the accident.

== Sources ==
- Battle Summary - No. 39: Operation "Neptune" Landings in Normandy June 1944: Volume II, Appendices. Tactical and Staff Duties Division, Admiralty. 1947. part 2 of 2.
- Blair, Clay (2000). Hitler's U-Boat War: The Hunters 1939–1942. London: Cassell & Co. ISBN 0-304-35260-8.
- Blair, Clay (2000). Hitler's U-Boat War: The Hunted 1942–1945. New York: Modern Library. ISBN 0-679-64033-9.
- Brown, David K (2007). Atlantic Escorts: Ships, Weapons & Tactics in World War II. Barnsley: Seaforth Publishing. ISBN 978-1-84415-702-0.
- Brown, David K (2006). Nelson to Vanguard: Warship Design and Development, 1923-1945. Naval Institute Press.
- Chesneau, Roger, ed. (1980). Conway's All the World's Fighting Ships 1922–1946. Greenwich, UK: Conway Maritime Press. ISBN 0-85177-146-7.
- Colledge, J. J.; Warlow, Ben (2006) [1969]. Ships of the Royal Navy: The Complete Record of All Fighting Ships of the Royal Navy from the 15th Century to the Present (3rd Rev ed.). London: Chatham Publishing. ISBN 978-1-86176-281-8. OCLC 67375475.
- Goodwin, Norman (2007). Castle Class Corvettes: An Account of the Service of the Ships and of Their Ships' Companies. Liskeard, UK: Maritime Books. ISBN 978-1-904459-27-9.
- Lambert, John; Brown, Les (2008). Flower Class Corvettes. ShipCraft Special. St. Catharines, Ontario: Vanwell Publishing. ISBN 978-1-55068-986-0.
- Lenton, H. T. (1998). British & Empire Warships of the Second World War. Annapolis, Maryland: Naval Institute Press. ISBN 1-55750-048-7.
- Rohwer, Jürgen; Hümmelchen, Gerhard (1992). Chronology of the War at Sea 1939–1945. London: Greenhill Books. ISBN 1-85367-117-7.
- Rohwer, Jürgen (2005). Chronology of the War at Sea 1939–1945: The Naval History of World War Two (Third Revised ed.). Annapolis, Maryland: Naval Institute Press. ISBN 1-59114-119-2.
- Winser, John de S. (1994). The D-Day Ships: Neptune: the Greatest Amphibious Operation in History. Kendal, UK: World Ship Society. ISBN 0-905617-75-4.
