= List of shipwrecks in December 1940 =

The list of shipwrecks in December 1940 includes ships sunk, foundered, grounded, or otherwise lost during December 1940.

== 1 December ==
For the sinking of Port Wellington on this day, see the entry for 30 November 1940

List of shipwrecks: 1 December 1940
Ship	State	Description
Appalachee	United Kingdom	World War II: Convoy HX 90: The 8,826 GRT tanker on a trip from Baytown for Avonmouth with a cargo of aviation spirit, was torpedoed and sunk in the Atlantic Ocean west of Ireland (54°30′N 20°00′W) by a U-101 (Kriegsmarine) with the loss of seven of her 39 crew. Survivors were rescued by Heliotrope (Royal Navy).
British Officer	United Kingdom	World War II: The 6,990 GRT tanker on a passage from Sheerness to the River Tyne in ballast, struck a mine in mouth of the River Tyne and was beached to prevent sinking, with the loss of five of her 47 crew. On 12 December the ship broke in two, and the stern section sank. The bow section was towed to port, where it was subsequently scrapped.
Her Majesty	United Kingdom	World War II: The paddle steamer was bombed and sunk at Southampton, Hampshire by Luftwaffe aircraft.
Loch Ranza	United Kingdom	World War II: Convoy HX 90: The 4,958 GRT cargo ship on a trip from Tacoma for Swansea with a cargo of grain and lumber, was torpedoed and damaged in the Atlantic Ocean (54°37′N 18°54′W) by U-101 (Kriegsmarine). She was beached in Rothesay Bay on 9 December. She was subsequently repaired, and returned to service in May 1941.
Oslofjord	Norway	World War II: The troopship struck a mine off Newcastle upon Tyne, Northumberland, United Kingdom and was beached at Tynemouth with her back broken. There was one casualty. She broke in two, capsized, and sank in bad weather at 55°0.17′N 1°23.72′W on 21–22 January 1941.
Palmella	United Kingdom	World War II: Convoy OG 46: The 1,578 GRT cargo ship on a trip from London for Porto with general cargo and mail, straggled behind the convoy. She was torpedoed and sunk in the Atlantic Ocean (40°30′N 13°30′W) by U-37 (Kriegsmarine) with the loss of one of her 29 crew. Survivors were rescued by the fishing trawler Navemar (Spain).
HMCS Saguenay	Royal Canadian Navy	World War II: The destroyer was torpedoed 300 miles (480 km) west of Ireland by the Italian submarine Argo (Regia Marina) while escorting Convoy HG 47. She managed to return to Barrow-in-Furness, Lancashire largely under her own power, but with 21 dead and without most of her bow
Santos	Germany	World War II: The cargo ship was bombed and sunk in the North Sea off Ostend, West Flanders, Belgium by Royal Air Force aircraft. She was later raised, repaired and returned to service.
Tribesman	United Kingdom	World War II: The 6,242 GRT cargo ship on a voyage from Liverpool for Calcutta with general cargo, was shelled and sunk in the Atlantic Ocean west of the Cape Verde Islands, Portugal (15°00′N 35°00′W) by Admiral Scheer (Kriegsmarine) with the loss of eight of her 53 crew. Fourteen of her crew were taken as prisoners of war.

== 2 December ==
List of shipwrecks: 2 December 1940
Ship	State	Description
Conch	United Kingdom	World War II: Convoy HX 90: The 8,376 GRT tanker on a trip from Trinidad for Clyde with a cargo of fuel oil, straggled behind the convoy. She was torpedoed and severely damaged in the Atlantic Ocean 370 nautical miles (690 km) west of Bloody Foreland, County Donegal, Ireland (55°40′N 19°00′W) by U-47 (Kriegsmarine). She was torpedoed and immobilized later the same day at that location by U-95 (Kriegsmarine). Her 53 crew abandoned the ship and were rescued by HMCS St. Laurent (Royal Canadian Navy). The abandoned vessel was torpedoed and sunk the next day by U-99 (Kriegsmarine).
HMS Forfar	Royal Navy	World War II: The 16,402 GRT armed merchant cruiser was torpedoed and sunk in the Atlantic Ocean west of Ireland (54°35′N 18°18′W) by U-99 (Kriegsmarine) with the loss of 173 of her 194 crew. Survivors were rescued by Dunsley (United Kingdom), HMCS St. Laurent (Royal Canadian Navy) and HMS Viscount (Royal Navy).
Goodleigh	United Kingdom	World War II: Convoy HX 90: The 5,448 GRT cargo ship on a trip from New Westminster for Oban with a cargo of lumber and spelter, was torpedoed and sunk in the Atlantic Ocean west of Ireland (55°02′N 18°45′W) by U-52 (Kriegsmarine) with the loss of one of her 37 crew. Survivors were rescued by HMS Viscount (Royal Navy).
Gwalia	Sweden	World War II: Convoy OG 46: The 1,258 GRT cargo ship on a trip from Cardiff for Lisbon with a cargo of coal and mail, straggled behind the convoy. She was torpedoed and sunk in the Atlantic Ocean off the coast of Portugal (39°22′N 14°22′W) by U-37 (Kriegsmarine) with the loss of sixteen of her 21 crew. Survivors were rescued by a Royal Navy destroyer.
Jeanne M.	United Kingdom	World War II: Convoy OG 46: The 2,465 GRT cargo ship on a trip from Cardiff for Lisbon with a cargo of coal, was torpedoed and sunk in the Atlantic Ocean (39°19′N 13°54′W) by U-37 (Kriegsmarine) with the loss of seven of her 26 crew. Survivors were rescued by HMT Erin (Royal Navy).
Jolly Girls	United Kingdom	World War II: The 483 GRT coaster on a trip from London for Rosyth with a cargo of ammunition and submarine cable, struck a mine and sank in the North Sea off Newcastle upon Tyne, Northumberland while under tow (55°00′29″N 01°23′08″W). Her crew were rescued.
Kavak	United Kingdom	World War II: Convoy HX 90: The 2,782 GRT cargo ship on a trip from Demerera for Newport with a cargo of bauxite ore and pitch, was torpedoed and sunk in the Atlantic Ocean (55°00′N 19°30′W) by U-101 (Kriegsmarine) with the loss of 25 of her 41 crew. Survivors were rescued by HMS Viscount (Royal Navy).
Kilgarran Castle	United Kingdom	World War II: The fishing trawler was bombed and sunk in the Atlantic Ocean (51°21′N 8°35′W) by Heinkel He 115 aircraft of Küstenfliegergruppe 406, Luftwaffe.
Lady Glanely	United Kingdom	World War II: Convoy HX 90: The 5,497 GRT cargo ship on a trip from Vancouver for London with a cargo of wheat and lumber, was torpedoed and sunk in the Atlantic Ocean west of Ireland (55°00′N 20°00′W) by U-101 (Kriegsmarine) with the loss of all 33 crew.
Migliarino	Italy	The 391 GRT motor schooner was bombed and sunk at Valona by 9 Blenheim Mk.I bombers of No. 211 Squadron RAF.
Pacific President	United Kingdom	World War II: Convoy HX 90: The 7,113 GRT cargo ship on a trip from Leith for New York in ballast, was torpedoed and sunk in the Atlantic Ocean west of Ireland (56°04′N 18°45′W) by U-43 (Kriegsmarine) with the loss of all 52 crew.
Samnanger	Norway	World War II: Convoy OB 251: The 4,276 GRT cargo ship on a trip from Hartlepool for Pepel in ballast, straggled behind the convoy. She was torpedoed and sunk in the Atlantic Ocean (approximately 54°N 18°W) by U-99 (Kriegsmarine) with the loss of all 30 crew.
Stirlingshire	United Kingdom	World War II: Convoy HX 90: The 6,022 GRT cargo ship on a trip from Sydney for Liverpool with a cargo of sugar, foodstuffs and lead, was torpedoed and sunk in the Atlantic Ocean 280 nautical miles (520 km) west of Bloody Foreland (55°36′N 16°22′W) by U-94 (Kriegsmarine). Her 74 crew were rescued by Empire Pride (United Kingdom).
Tasso	United Kingdom	World War II: Convoy HX 90: The 1,586 GRT cargo ship on a trip from Demerara for Oban with a cargo of timber, was torpedoed and sunk in the Atlantic Ocean west of Ireland (55°03′N 18°04′W) by U-52 (Kriegsmarine) with the loss of five of her 32 crew. Survivors were rescued by HMS Viscount (Royal Navy).
Victor Ross	United Kingdom	World War II: Convoy OB 251: The 12,247 GRT motor tanker on a trip from Liverpool for New York in ballast, was torpedoed and sunk in the Atlantic Ocean west of the Outer Hebrides (56°04′N 18°30′W) by U-43 (Kriegsmarine) with the loss of all 44 crew.
Ville d'Arlon	Belgium	World War II: Convoy HX 90: The 7,555 GRT passenger ship on a trip from New York for Liverpool with general cargo, straggled behind the convoy due to defects with her steering. She was torpedoed and sunk in the Atlantic Ocean, (55°00′N 19°30′W) by U-47 (Kriegsmarine) with the loss of all 57 people on board.
Wilhelmina	United Kingdom	World War II: Convoy HX 90: The 6,725 GRT cargo ship on a trip from New Westminster for Liverpool with general cargo, fish and wood pulp, was torpedoed and sunk in the Atlantic Ocean (55°43′N 15°06′W) by U-94 (Kriegsmarine) with the loss of five of her 39 crew. Survivors were rescued by HMS Gentian (Royal Navy).

== 3 December ==
List of shipwrecks: 3 December 1940
Ship	State	Description
Victoria City	United Kingdom	World War II: Convoy HX 90: The 4,739 GRT cargo ship on a trip from New York for London with a cargo of steel, straggled behind the convoy. She was torpedoed and sunk in the Atlantic Ocean by U-140 (Kriegsmarine) with the loss of all 43 crew.
W. Hendrik	United Kingdom	World War II: Convoy HX 90: The 4,360 GRT cargo ship was bombed and sunk in the Atlantic Ocean (56°26′N 12°20′W) by I./KG.40 Fw-200 aircraft with the loss of five of her 35 crew.

== 4 December ==
List of shipwrecks: 4 December 1940
Ship	State	Description
Daphne	Sweden	World War II: Convoy OG 46: The 1,513 GRT cargo ship on a trip from Glasgow for Lisbon with a cargo of coal, straggled behind the convoy. She was torpedoed and sunk in the Atlantic Ocean south west of Cabo Espichel, Portugal (38°12′N 9°26′W) by U-37 (Kriegsmarine) with the loss of eighteen of her nineteen crew.
Edwin Duke	United States	The tug sank during a storm in 55 feet (17 m) of water in the North Atlantic Ocean off Jones Beach Island south of Long Island, New York. USCGC Pontchartrain ( United States Coast Guard) took off her crew before she sank.
Empire Seaman	United Kingdom	The cargo ship was scuttled as a blockship at a British Channel port, or in East Weddell Sound (58°52′17″N 2°54′33″W).
Helene	Belgium	World War II: The fishing trawler struck a mine and sank off Milford Haven, Pembrokeshire, United Kingdom (51°41′N 5°09′W).
Skogheim	Norway	The cargo ship ran aground near the Songvår Lighthouse in Søgne Municipality and was wrecked. Her 26 crew survived.

== 5 December ==
List of shipwrecks: 5 December 1940
Ship	State	Description
Amlwch Rose	United Kingdom	The collier foundered in the Irish Sea north of Great Orme Head, Caernarvonshire with the loss of ten of her crew.
Calipso	Regia Marina	World War II: The Spica-class torpedo boat struck a mine and sank in the Mediterranean Sea east of Tobruk, Libya. Ninety of her 129 crew were killed.
HMS Cameron	Royal Navy	World War II: The Town-class destroyer was bombed while in drydock at Portsmouth, Hampshire by Luftwaffe aircraft. Fourteen crew were killed. HMS Cameron capsized as the drydock filled with water. She was raised in February 1941 and had been repaired by April 1941. She was subsequently used as a hull stress test ship.
Iderwald	Germany	World War II: The cargo ship was intercepted south of Cuba by HMS Diomede (Royal Navy) and was set afire by her crew. Iderwald sank on 9 December.
Klaus Schoke	Germany	World War II: The cargo ship sank three days after being intercepted in the Atlantic Ocean off the Azores, Portugal (38°28′N 22°15′W) by HMS California (Royal Navy). After an attempt to scuttle her, she had been taken in tow to Gibraltar but sank en route. Her 30 crew were captured.
Nimbin	Australia	World War II: The cargo ship struck a mine and sank in the Pacific Ocean off Norah Head, New South Wales (33°15′S 151°47′E) with the loss of seven of her 20 crew.
Oscar Midling	Finland	World War II: The 2,237 GRT cargo ship on a trip from Petsamo for Malmö with a cargo of nickel ore, was torpedoed and sunk in off Vågsøy (62°03′N 5°06′E) by HMS Sunfish (Royal Navy) with the loss of all 25 people on board.
Privet	United Kingdom	The 360 GRT coaster on a trip from Birkenhead for Belfast with a cargo of coal, foundered in Liverpool Bay off Birkenhead, Cheshire with the loss of all nine crew in a severe storm.
Silverpine	United Kingdom	World War II: Convoy OB 252: The 5,066 GRT cargo ship on a trip from Liverpool for New York in ballast, straggled behind the convoy. She was torpedoed and sunk in the Atlantic Ocean west of Ireland (54°14′N 18°08′W) by Argo (Regia Marina) with the loss of 36 of her 55 crew.

== 6 December ==
List of shipwrecks: 6 December 1940
Ship	State	Description
Accomac	United Kingdom	The 347 GRT coaster on a trip from Belfast for Silloth with a cargo of clay, suffered a boiler explosion while in Belfast Lough, ran aground and was wrecked at Pickie, Bangor, County Down. Her crew were rescued.
C 22 S Jupiter	Kriegsmarine	World War II: Operation Sealion: The requisitioned 218 GRT fishing trawler ran aground off Borkum and was wrecked. Raised in 1947, repaired and returned to service.
Mousse le Moyec	France	The 2,147 GRT collier on a passage from Plymouth for Bristol Channel in ballast, ran aground at Hartland Point, Devon, United Kingdom and was wrecked.
Nyland	Norway	World War II: Convoy EN 35: The 1,371 GRT cargo ship on a passage from Tyne for Mackenzie River in ballast, ran aground off Iona, Inner Hebrides in a strong gale and sank with the loss of all twenty crew.
HMS Regulus	Royal Navy	World War II: The Rainbow-class submarine struck a mine and sank in the Mediterranean Sea off Taranto, Italy with the loss of all 55 crew.
Skrim	Norway	World War II: Convoy OB 252: The 1,902 GRT cargo ship on a trip from Grangemouth for Sydney, straggled behind the convoy. She was torpedoed and sunk in the Atlantic Ocean by U-43 (Kriegsmarine) in an approximate position 53°0′N 21°0′W with the loss of all 23 crew.
South Coaster	United Kingdom	The 513 GRT coaster on a passage from Penzance for Cardiff in ballast, ran into a gale and was abandoned in the Bristol Channel. Her ten crew were rescued by Rachel and Mary Evans ( Royal National Lifeboat Institution). The ship was repaired and returned to service.
Supremity	United Kingdom	World War II: The 554 GRT coaster on a trip from Blyth for London with a cargo of coal, struck a mine and sank in the Thames Estuary north of Whitstable, Kent with the loss of a crew member.
Triona	Australia	World War II: The cargo ship was shelled and sunk in the Pacific Ocean off Nauru (5°12′S 165°39′E) by Komet and Orion (both Kriegsmarine) with the loss of four of her 64 crew. Survivors were taken as prisoners of war.

== 7 December ==
List of shipwrecks: 7 December 1940
Ship	State	Description
HMT Capricornus	Royal Navy	World War II: The naval trawler struck a mine and sank in the Thames Estuary north east of Sheerness, Kent.
HMT Cortina	Royal Navy	The naval trawler collided with HMS Lormont (Royal Navy) at the mouth of the Humber. Both ships sank.
Farmsum	Netherlands	World War II: Convoy OB 252: The 5,237 GRT cargo ship on a trip from Blyth for Buenos Aires with a cargo of coal, straggled behind the convoy. She was torpedoed and sunk in the Atlantic Ocean south west of Ireland (52°11′N 22°56′W) by U-99 (Kriegsmarine) with the loss of sixteen of her 31 crew. Survivors were rescued by HMS Ambuscade (Royal Navy).
HMS Lormont	Royal Navy	The guard ship collided with HMT Cortina (Royal Navy) at the mouth of the Humber. Both ships sank.
O 10 Adalia	Kriegsmarine	The requisitioned 3,199 GRT cargo ship collided with Mendoza (Germany) and sank off Vlissingen, Zeeland, Netherlands.
Phæax	Greece	The cargo ship was driven ashore and wrecked near Nojimazaki, Japan.
Stolwijk	Netherlands	World War II: Convoy SC 13: The cargo ship ran aground between Inishdovey and Inishborin, County Donegal, Ireland and was wrecked with the loss of ten of her 28 crew.
Vinni	Norway	World War II: The 5,181 GRT cargo ship, awaiting loading off Nauru, was surprised by Komet (Kriegsmarine). After a short chase, the ship was stopped, her crew taken prisoner, and the vessel was sunk by explosive charges about 6 nautical miles (11 km) off Nauru.
Watkins F. Nisbet	Canada	The sailing ship was wrecked or foundered.

== 8 December ==
List of shipwrecks: 8 December 1940
Ship	State	Description
Actuality	United Kingdom	World War II: The coaster struck a mine and sank north west of the Isle of Sheppey, Kent and 3 nautical miles (5.6 km) off the Mouse Lightship ( Trinity House).
Anthea	United Kingdom	The cargo ship collided with Maasdam (Netherlands) and sank off the coast of the Canada (44°48′N 46°37′W).
Ashcrest	United Kingdom	World War II: Convoy SC 13: The 5,652 GRT cargo ship on a trip from Philadelphia for Middlesbrough with a cargo of steel, straggled behind the convoy due to a broken rudder. She was torpedoed and sunk in the Atlantic Ocean off the west coast of Ireland (55°12′N 10°20′W) by U-140 (Kriegsmarine) with the loss of all 38 crew.
Beothic	Canada	The cargo ship ran aground off Cape Bauld, Dominion of Newfoundland and was wrecked.
Calabria	United Kingdom	World War II: Convoy SLS 56: The 9,515 GRT cargo liner on a trip from Calcutta for Liverpool with a cargo of iron ore, tea and oil cake, straggled behind the convoy. She was torpedoed and sunk in the Atlantic Ocean 295 nautical miles (546 km) off the Slyne Head Lighthouse, County Galway Ireland (52°43′N 18°07′W) by U-103 (Kriegsmarine) with the loss of all 360 people on board.
Empire Jaguar	United Kingdom	World War II: The Design 1105 ship was torpedoed and sunk in the Atlantic Ocean 296 nautical miles (548 km) west south west of the Slyne Head Lighthouse (51°34′N 17°35′W) by U-103 (Kriegsmarine) with the loss of all 37 crew.
Gorsethorn	United Kingdom	The cargo ship foundered in Liverpool Bay.
Idarwald	Germany	World War II: The cargo ship was intercepted in the Caribbean Sea south of Cuba (21°34′N 84°25′W) by HMS Diomede (Royal Navy) and an attempt was made to scuttle her. She finally sank on 9 December. The 45 men of Idarwald's crew were all captured by HMS Diomede.
Komata	United Kingdom	World War II: German attacks on Nauru: The cargo ship was shelled and sunk in the Pacific Ocean 20 nautical miles (37 km) east of Nauru by Komet (Kriegsmarine) with the loss of two of her crew.
Penang	Finland	World War II: The 2,019 GRT barque on a voyage from Port Victoria for Queenstown with a cargo of grain, was torpedoed and sunk in the Atlantic Ocean northwest of Tory Island (55°25′N 10°15′W) by U-140 (Kriegsmarine) with the loss of all eighteen crew.
Triadic	United Kingdom	World War II: German attacks on Nauru: The cargo ship was captured and scuttled in the Pacific Ocean off Nauru (0°43′S 167°20′E) by Orion (Kriegsmarine) with the loss of one of her 69 crew. Eleven survivors were taken as prisoners of war.
Triaster	United Kingdom	World War II: German attacks on Nauru: The cargo liner was shelled and sunk in the Pacific Ocean off Nauru by Orion (Kriegsmarine) with the loss of one of her 75 crew. Fifteen survivors were taken as prisoners of war.

== 9 December ==
List of shipwrecks: 9 December 1940
Ship	State	Description
HMS Royal Scot	Royal Navy	World War II: The anti-aircraft vessel struck a mine and sank in the Bristol Channel. A crew member was killed.
Usaramo	Kriegsmarine	World War II: The accommodation ship was bombed and damaged at Bordeaux, Gironde, France and was consequently beached.

== 10 December ==
List of shipwrecks: 10 December 1940
Ship	State	Description
Aghia Eirini	Greece	The cargo ship's steering gear had failed on 5 December. She ran aground at Clew Bay, County Mayo, Ireland and was wrecked.
Marangona	Italy	World War II: The 5,227 GRT tanker on a passage from Tripoli for Palermo, struck a mine and sank in the Mediterranean Sea 27 nautical miles (50 km) south of Pantelleria (36°13′N 11°59′E) with the loss of two lives.
Thor	Kriegsmarine	World War II: The tug was shelled and sunk in the English Channel off Cherbourg, Seine-Inférieure, France.
Tor I	Faroe Islands	World war II: The fishing trawler struck a mine and sank in the Atlantic Ocean (65°20′N 12°40′W).

== 11 December ==
List of shipwrecks: 11 December 1940
Ship	State	Description
Empire Statesman	United Kingdom	World War II: Convoy SLS 56: The 5,306 GRT cargo ship on a trip from Pepel for Oban and Tees with a cargo of iron ore, straggled behind the convoy due to problems with her engine. She was torpedoed and sunk in the Atlantic Ocean west of Ireland (53°40′N 17°00′W) by U-94 (Kriegsmarine) with the loss of all 32 crew.
Rhein	Germany	World War II: The cargo ship was intercepted in the Straits of Florida (24°55′N 83°15′W) by HNLMS Van Kinsbergen (Koninklijk Marine) and an attempt was made to scuttle her. Her crew were rescued by HNLMS Van Kinsbergen. The burnt-out wreck was sunk later that day by HMS Caradoc (Royal Navy).
Robinia	United Kingdom	World War II: The 116.3-foot (35.4 m), 207.5-ton fishing trawler struck a British mine and sank in the Atlantic Ocean (62°20′N 12°40′W). Her crew were rescued.
Rotorua	United Kingdom	World War II: Convoy HX 92: The 10,890 GRT troopship on a voyage from Lyttleton for Avonmouth with general cargo and 20 passengers, was torpedoed and sunk in the Atlantic Ocean off St. Kilda (58°56′N 11°20′W) by U-96 with the loss of 22 of the 132 people on board. Survivors were rescued by HMT Alsey, HMT Ebor Wyke and HMT Varanga (all Royal Navy).
Towa	Netherlands	World War II: Convoy HX 92: The 5,419 GRT cargo ship on a trip from Sorel for London with a cargo of grain and trucks, was torpedoed and sunk in the Atlantic Ocean west north west of the Outer Hebrides, United Kingdom (58°50′N 10°10′W by U-96 (Kriegsmarine) with the loss of eighteen of her 37 crew. Survivors were rescued by HMS Matabele (Royal Navy).

== 12 December ==
List of shipwrecks: 12 December 1940
Ship	State	Description
Dionyssios Stathatos	Greece	World War II: Convoy HX 91: The 5,168 GRT cargo ship on a trip from Montreal for Glasgow with a cargo of cereals, foundered in the Atlantic Ocean (58°31′N 21°55′W) with the loss of all hands.
Macedonier	Belgium	World War II: Convoy HX 92: The cargo ship was torpedoed and sunk in the Atlantic Ocean 10 nautical miles (19 km) south of St Kilda, United Kingdom (57°52′N 8°42′W) by U-96 (Kriegsmarine) with the loss of four of her 47 crew. Survivors were rescued by Súlan ( Iceland).
Margrethe	Denmark	World War II: The fishing vessel struck a mine and sank in the North Sea off Sylt, Germany. Three of her crew were killed.
Salvador	Uruguay	The passenger ship departed from Istanbul, Turkey carrying 327 passengers - Bulgarian Jewish refugees. She had a capacity for only 40 passengers. She foundered in the Sea of Marmara with the loss of 204 passengers.
Stureholm	Sweden	World War II: Convoy HX 92: The cargo ship was torpedoed and sunk in the Atlantic Ocean west of the Hebrides, Scotland (at 57°50′N 8°40′W), by U-96 (Kriegsmarine) with the loss of all 32 crew.

== 13 December ==
List of shipwrecks: 13 December 1940
Ship	State	Description
B-18 Arcangelo Gabriele	Regia Marina	The 27 GRT auxiliary minesweeper, a former motor fishing vessel, was bombed and sunk at Bardia by Royal Air Force aircraft.
Schwalbe	Germany	The cargo ship ran aground off Utö, Finland and was wrecked.
Sebastiano Bianchi	Italy	World War II: The 1,546 GRT cargo ship on a passage from Sant'Antioco for Taranto was torpedoed and sunk in the Mediterranean Sea 10 nautical miles (19 km) east-northeast of Cape Spartivento (37°58′N 16°15′E) by HMS Truant (Royal Navy). Her crew survived.

== 14 December ==
List of shipwrecks: 14 December 1940
Ship	State	Description
HMS Branlebas	Royal Navy	The La Melpomène-class torpedo boat sank in the Atlantic Ocean off the Eddystone Rocks during a storm with the loss of 101 of her 104 crew. Survivors were rescued by Mistral (Free French Naval Forces).
Cardross	Australia	The 1,896 GRT cargo ship on a trip from Sydney for Melbourne with general cargo, was damaged in collision with Fiona (United Kingdom) and sank off Sydney, New South Wales (34°07′S 151°32′E) while under tow.
Euphorbia	United Kingdom	World War II: The 3,380 GRT cargo ship on a trip from Swansea for Lynn with a cargo of coal, was torpedoed and sunk in the Atlantic Ocean west south west of Rockall, Inverness-shire by U-100 (Kriegsmarine) with the loss of all 34 crew.
V-58 Immacolata Terza	Regia Marina	The 27 GRT requisitioned motor schooner was bombed and sunk during the raid on Naples by Fairey Swordfish bombers of 830 Naval Air Squadron, Fleet Air Arm. She was later raised, repaired and returned to service.
Kyleglen	United Kingdom	World War II: The 3,670 GRT cargo ship on a passage from Middlesbrough for Baltimore in ballast, was torpedoed and sunk in the Atlantic Ocean west of the Outer Hebrides (58°00′N 25°00′W) by U-100 (Kriegsmarine) with the loss of all 36 crew.
Naiade	Regia Marina	World War II: The Sirena-class submarine was shelled and sunk in the Mediterranean Sea off Bardia, Libya (32°03′N 25°26′E) by HMS Hereward and HMS Hyperion (both Royal Navy). A crew member was killed; the 47 survivors were captured.
Pola	Regia Marina	The Zara-class cruiser was bombed and damaged during the raid on Naples by Fairey Swordfish bombers of 830 Naval Air Squadron, Fleet Air Arm. She was repaired and returned to service in February 1941.
Western Prince	United Kingdom	World War II: The 10,926 GRT cargo liner on a trip from New York for Liverpool with general cargo, was torpedoed and sunk in the Atlantic Ocean 400 nautical miles (740 km) west of the Orkney Islands (59°32′N 17°47′W) by U-96 (Kriegsmarine) with the loss of fifteen of the 169 people on board; survivors were rescued by HMS Active (Royal Navy) and Baron Kinnaird (United Kingdom).

== 15 December ==
List of shipwrecks: 15 December 1940
Ship	State	Description
Capitano Tarantini	Regia Marina	World War II: The Liuzzi-class submarine was torpedoed and sunk in the Gironde Estuary (45°25′N 1°22′W) by HMS Thunderbolt (Royal Navy) with the loss of 51 of her 56 crew.
N. C. Monberg	Denmark	World War II: Convoy FS 360: The 2,301 GRT collier on a trip from Tyne for London with a cargo of coal, was torpedoed and sunk in the North Sea off Great Yarmouth, Norfolk, United Kingdom (52°24′N 02°05′E) by S 25 and S 58 (both Kriegsmarine) with the loss of nine of her crew.

== 16 December ==
List of shipwrecks: 16 December 1940
Ship	State	Description
Arrigoni	Italy	The 103 GRT coaster ran into storm and was wrecked off Francavilla al Mare.
Bonzo	Italy	World War II: The 8,177 GRT tanker on a passage from Taranto for Augusta, was torpedoed and sunk in the Ionian Sea off Punta Stilo (38°28′N 16°44′E) by HMS Truant (Royal Navy) with the loss of 29 of her 35 crew.
Heltraud	Germany	World War II: The fishing trawler was sunk by enemy action.
San Carlos	Spain	World War II: The coaster was shelled and sunk in the Atlantic Ocean off Cape Juby by U-37 (Kriegsmarine) with the loss of one of the 28 people on board.

== 17 December ==
List of shipwrecks: 17 December 1940
Ship	State	Description
HMS Acheron	Royal Navy	World War II: The A-class destroyer struck a mine and sank in the English Channel off the Isle of Wight while on trials with the loss of 45 dockyard workers and 151 crewmen. There were nineteen survivors.
Aqueity	United Kingdom	World War II: The 301 GRT coaster on a trip from London for Sunderland with a cargo of cement, struck a mine and sank in the Thames Estuary south of Southend, Essex with the loss of six of her crew.
Belvedere	United Kingdom	World War II: The 869 GRT coaster on a passage from London for Tyne with general cargo, struck a mine and sank in the Thames Estuary north of the Isle of Sheppey, Kent with the loss four of her six crew.
Beneficient	United Kingdom	World War II: The 2,944 GRT cargo ship traveling in a convoy from Sunderland for London with a cargo of coal, struck a mine and sank in the Thames Estuary north of the Isle of Sheppey with the loss of six of her crew.
HMT Carry On	Royal Navy	World War II: The 93 GRT barrage balloon drifter struck a mine and sank east of the Nore Sand Lightship ( Trinity House) with the loss of seven of her crew.
Galata	Italy	World War II: The 618 GRT coaster was shelled and sunk at Bardia, Libya by HMS Ladybird, HMS Terror (both Royal Navy), HMAS Voyager and HMAS Vendetta (both Royal Australian Navy).
V-13 Giuseppina D.	Regia Marina	World War II: The requisitioned 431 GRT motor schooner was shelled and sunk at Bardia by HMS Ladybird, HMS Terror (both Royal Navy), HMAS Voyager and HMAS Vendetta (both Royal Australian Navy).
Inga	Finland	The cargo ship collided with Silkeborg (Denmark) and sank in the Kiel Canal, Germany.
Inver	United Kingdom	World War II: The 1,543 GRT cargo ship on a trip from Blyth for Cowes with a cargo of coal, struck a mine and sank in the Thames Estuary north of Sheerness with the loss of seventeen of her crew.
KP-7	Soviet Navy	The ship ran aground on the Rodscher Bank, in the Baltic Sea and sank.
Malrix	United Kingdom	World War II: The 703 GRT coaster on passage from Hull for London with a cargo of coal, struck a mine and sank in the Thames Estuary north of Whitstable, Kent with the loss of eight of her crew.
Paranaguá	Germany	World War II: The cargo ship struck a mine and sank off Den Helder, North Holland, Netherlands (52°55′N 4°41′E).
Srebeno	Yugoslavia	The cargo ship was driven ashore near Split. She broke in two and sank.
HMT Thomas Connolly	Royal Navy	World War II: The boom defence vessel struck a mine and sank in the Thames Estuary north of Sheerness with the loss of seventeen of her crew.
V-43 Vincenzino	Regia Marina	World War II: The requisitioned 190 GRT motor schooner was shelled and sunk at Bardia by HMS Ladybird, HMS Terror (both Royal Navy), HMAS Voyager and HMAS Vendetta (both Royal Australian Navy).

== 18 December ==
List of shipwrecks: 18 December 1940
Ship	State	Description
Anastassia	Greece	World War II: Convoy SC 15: The cargo ship was torpedoed and damaged in the Atlantic Ocean west of Ireland (54°24′N 19°04′W) by Veniero (Regia Marina) with the loss of eighteen of her 28 crew. Survivors were taken as prisoners of war. Anastassia was observed drifting on 20 December, and later sank.
Birkenfels	Germany	World War II: The cargo ship was anchored off Vlissingen, Zeeland Netherlands, when she was sunk by depth charges dropped alongside her by HMS MTB 31 (Royal Navy) after two failed torpedo attacks. There were nine dead and missing and 39 survivors. The wreck was dispersed by explosives in 1941 and finally cleared in October 1966.
Napier Star	United Kingdom	World War II: The 10,116 GRT refrigerated cargo liner on a trip from Liverpool for New Zealand with general cargo, was torpedoed and sunk in the Atlantic Ocean west of the Outer Hebrides (58°58′N 23°13′W) by U-100 (Kriegsmarine) with the loss of 71 of the 99 people on board. Survivors were rescued by Vaalaren (Sweden).
Chassiron	France	World War II: The tug (172 GRT) was torpedoed and sunk in the Gironde Estuary by HMS Tuna (Royal Navy).
RFA Osage	Royal Fleet Auxiliary	World War II: The tanker was bombed and sunk in the Irish Sea off Wicklow Head, County Wicklow, Ireland by Focke-Wulf Fw 200 aircraft of I Staffeln, Kampfgeschwader 40, Luftwaffe. Her crew were rescued.
HMT Refundo	Royal Navy	World War II: The 258 GRT naval trawler struck a mine and was damaged in the Orwell Estuary off Harwich, Essex (51°56′06″N 1°21′02″E) with the loss of two of her crew. She was taken in tow but sank.

== 19 December ==
For the scuttling of the Greek cargo ship Eugenia Cambasis on this day, see the entry for 28 November 1940.

List of shipwrecks: 19 December 1940
Ship	State	Description
Amicus	United Kingdom	World War II: Convoy SC 15: The 3,660 GRT cargo ship on a trip from Tampa for Ipswich with a cargo of phosphates, was torpedoed and sunk in the Atlantic Ocean west of Ireland (54°10′N 15°50′W) by Alpino Bagnolini (Regia Marina) with the loss of all 37 crew.
Arinia	United Kingdom	World War II: The 8,024 GRT tanker on a voyage from Aruba for Isle of Grain with a cargo of petroleum spirit, struck a mine and was set afire in the Thames Estuary off the Nore Lightship ( Trinity House) (51°29′08″N 0°51′03″E) with the loss of all 60 people on board. She continued burning and broke in two on 21 December and sank 5 nautical miles (9.3 km) east-southeast of Southend pier.
Erling Skjalgson	Norway	The cargo ship foundered in the North Sea off Jæren. All six crew were rescued by a fishing vessel.
Freienfels	Kriegsmarine	World War II: Operation Felix: The 7,563 GRT passenger-cargo ship on a passage for France to load troops and materiel, wandered into unreported Italian minefield between Gorgona and Livorno, hit a mine and sank south of Livorno.
Geierfels	Kriegsmarine	World War II: Operation Felix: The 7,605 GRT cargo ship on a passage for France to load troops and materiel, wandered into unreported Italian minefield between Gorgona and Livorno, hit a mine and sank south of Livorno.
Isolda	Trinity House	World War II: The lightship tender was bombed and sunk in St. George's Channel off Carnsore Point, County Wexford, Ireland by Focke-Wulf Fw 200 aircraft of I Staffeln, Kampfgeschwader 40, Luftwaffe with the loss of six of her crew.
Jacob Mærsk	Denmark	The 2,245 GRT cargo ship on a trip from Køge for Frederikssund with a cargo of saltpeter, hit a mine while navigating in Drogden and was subsequently beached. Raised, repaired and returned to service in 1941.
HMT Proficient	Royal Navy	The 58 GRT requisitioned motor drifter ran aground at Whitby, Yorkshire and was wrecked.
Rhône	(France) Vichy French Navy	World War II: The tanker was torpedoed and sunk in the Atlantic Ocean off Cape Juby, Morocco (28°03′N 12°54′W) in error by U-37 (Kriegsmarine) with the loss of eleven of her crew.
Sfax	(France) Vichy French Navy	World War II: The Redoutable-class submarine was torpedoed and sunk by mistake in the Atlantic Ocean off Cape Juby (28°03′N 12°54′W) by U-37 (Kriegsmarine) with the loss of 65 of her 69 crew.

== 20 December ==
List of shipwrecks: 20 December 1940
Ship	State	Description
Carlton	United Kingdom	World War II: Convoy OB 260: The cargo ship was torpedoed and sunk in the Atlantic Ocean west of Ireland (54°30′N 18°30′W) by Pietro Calvi (Regia Marina) with the loss of 31 of her 35 crew. Survivors were rescued by Antiope (United Kingdom) on 7 January 1941. Carlton was on a voyage from Newport, Monmouthshire to Buenos Aires, Argentina.
Consul Poppe	Germany	World War II: The 1,412 GRT cargo ship was bombed and sunk by Royal Air Force bombers at Boulogne roadstead.
HMS LCP(L) 30	Royal Navy	World War II: The Landing Craft Personnel (Large) was bombed and sunk at Liverpool, Lancashire by Luftwaffe aircraft.
Overdale	United Kingdom	World War II: The hopper barge was bombed and sunk at Liverpool by Luftwaffe aircraft with the loss of three of her crew.

== 21 December ==
List of shipwrecks: 21 December 1940
Ship	State	Description
Anvers	Germany	The cargo ship was towing a barge in a convoy from Granville, Manche, France to Jersey Channel Islands when she got into difficulty and sank in the Chausey Islands, Manche.
Charles Pratt	Panama	World War II: The 8,982 GRT tanker on a trip from Aruba for Freetown with a cargo of fuel, was torpedoed and sunk in the Atlantic Ocean off the coast of Sierra Leone (8°26′N 16°50′W) by U-68 (Kriegsmarine) with the loss of two of her 42 crew. Survivors were rescued by Gascony and Langleegorse (both United Kingdom).
Innisfallen	Ireland	Innisfallen World War II: The ferry struck a mine off the Wirral, Cheshire, United Kingdom and sank with the loss of four of the 220 people on board.
Mangen	Sweden	World War II: Convoy OG 47: The 1,253 GRT cargo ship on a trip from Cardiff for Lisbon with a cargo of coal, was torpedoed and sunk in the Atlantic Ocean 300 nautical miles (560 km) west of Porto, Portugal (40°45′N 16°50′W) by Mocenigo (Regia Marina) with the loss of eight of her crew. Survivors were rescued by Garm (Sweden).
Norge	Italy	World War II: The 6,511 GRT cargo ship on a trip from Palermo for Tripoli was torpedoed and sunk in the Mediterranean Sea east of the Kerkennah Islands, Tunisia (34°39′N 10°48′E) by Fairey Swordfish aircraft of 815 and 819 Squadrons, Fleet Air Arm, based on HMS Illustrious (Royal Navy) with the loss of three lives.
Peuceta	Italy	World War II: The 1,926 GRT cargo ship on a trip from Palermo for Tripoli was torpedoed and sunk in the Mediterranean Sea east of the Kerkennah Islands (34°39′N 10°48′E) by Fairey Swordfish aircraft of 815 and 819 Squadrons, Fleet Air Arm based on HMS Illustrious (Royal Navy) with the loss of three lives.
HMS Prome	Royal Navy	The depot ship was bombed and damaged at Liverpool, Lancashire.
River Thames	United Kingdom	The tug sank in the Thames Estuary north of Sheerness, Kent (51°28′N 0°46′E) with the loss of three of her crew.
Silvio	United Kingdom	World War II: The 1,284 GRT cargo ship was bombed and sunk in South Alexandra Dock Branch, Liverpool by Luftwaffe aircraft with the loss of a crew member.
HMS Sun IX	Royal Navy	The 196 GRT naval tug struck a mine and sank in the Thames Estuary north of Sheerness with the loss of three of her crew.
TIC 12	United Kingdom	World War II: The barge struck a mine and sank in the Thames Estuary (51°28′N 0°46′E). Her crew were rescued.

== 22 December ==
List of shipwrecks: 22 December 1940
Ship	State	Description
Anthippi N. Michalos	Greece	World War II: Convoy SC 15: The 3,298 GRT cargo ship on a trip from Wabana for Cardiff with a cargo of iron ore, collided with Beaverdale (United Kingdom) and sank in Caernarvon Bay 20 nautical miles (37 km) southwest of Holyhead (53°10′N 5°03′W).
Antonietta	Italy	World War II: The 70 GRT motor schooner on a trip from Brindisi for Valona was rammed and sunk in the Adriatic Sea (40°40′N 18°40′E) by Papanikolis (Royal Hellenic Navy). Her six crew were interrogated by the submarine's commander and alerted him of a convoy scheduled to travel to Valona in 2 days.
HMS H31	Royal Navy	The H-class submarine foundered at Campbeltown, Argyllshire. She was raised on 25 December. Subsequently repaired and returned to service.
HMS Hyperion	Royal Navy	World War II: The H-class destroyer struck a mine in the Mediterranean Sea off Pantelleria and was damaged. She was taken in tow by HMS Ilex (Royal Navy), but later scuttled by HMS Janus (Royal Navy) (37°40′N 11°31′E). Two of her 146 crew were killed.
MAC 7	Royal Navy	The mooring attendant craft sank at Portsmouth, Hampshire. She was refloated, but was declared a total loss in January 1941 following a fire.
Poolgarth	United Kingdom	World War II: The 179 GRT tug, enroute to assist a vessel in distress, struck a mine and sank in the River Mersey off South Canada Dock pier at Liverpool with the loss of all seven crew.

== 23 December ==
List of shipwrecks: 23 December 1940
Ship	State	Description
Breda	Netherlands	World War II: The cargo ship was bombed and sunk in Loch Etive (56°29′12″N 5°25′00″W) by Focke-Wulf Fw 200 aircraft of I Staffeln, Kampfgeschwader 40, Luftwaffe. Her crew were rescued. The wreck was dispersed by explosives in 1961.
Fratelli Cairoli	Regia Marina	World War II: The Rosolino Pilo-class destroyer (770 GRT) struck a mine and sank in the Mediterranean Sea off Misrata, Libya (32°48′N 14°50′W) with the loss of 71 of her 114 crew.
Stad Maastricht	Netherlands	World War II: The tanker was torpedoed and damaged in the North Sea south east of Clacton-on-Sea, Essex, United Kingdom (52°35′N 2°03′E) by S 59 (Kriegsmarine). She was taken in tow by Kenia, Krooman and Norman (all United Kingdom) but consequently sank (51°42′09″N 1°22′08″E).
HMS Warwick	Royal Navy	World War II: The W-class destroyer struck a mine in Liverpool Bay off the Bar Lightship ( Trinity House) and was severely damaged. She was beached off Liverpool, Lancashire. She was subsequently repaired, and returned to service in March 1942.
Ystroom	Netherlands	World War II: The coaster struck a mine and sank in Liverpool Bay off Southport, Lancashire (53°37′N 3°25′W). Her crew were rescued.

== 24 December ==
List of shipwrecks: 24 December 1940
Ship	State	Description
British Premier	United Kingdom	World War II: Convoy SLS 60: The tanker was torpedoed and sunk in the Atlantic Ocean 200 nautical miles (370 km) south west of Freetown, Sierra Leone (6°20′N 13°20′W) by U-65 (Kriegsmarine) with the loss of 32 of her 45 crew. Nine survivors were rescued by HMS Hawkins (Royal Navy) on 3 January, and four by HMS Faulknor (Royal Navy) on 3 February. British Premier was on a voyage from Abadan, Iran to Swansea, Glamorgan.
Firenze	Italy	World War II: The 3,952 GRT troopship travelling in a convoy from Bari for Valona carrying troops of 4th Alpine Division "Cuneense", was torpedoed and sunk in the Adriatic Sea about 12 nautical miles (22 km) west-northwest of Saseno (40°34′N 19°02′E) by Papanikolis (Royal Hellenic Navy) with the loss of 93 of the 996 people on board.
HMS Mercury	Royal Navy	World War II: The auxiliary minesweeper struck a mine and was damaged in the Atlantic Ocean south of Ireland. She sank the next day whilst under tow by HMS Goatfell (Royal Navy).
HMS Pelton	Royal Navy	World War II: The minesweeping trawler was torpedoed and sunk off Great Yarmouth, Norfolk by S-28 (Kriegsmarine).

== 25 December ==
List of shipwrecks: 25 December 1940
Ship	State	Description
Empire Trooper	United Kingdom	World War II: The troopship was shelled and damaged in the Atlantic Ocean by Admiral Hipper (Kriegsmarine) whilst in a convoy. She was subsequently repaired and returned to service.
Jumna	United Kingdom	World War II: The cargo ship was shelled and sunk in the Atlantic Ocean west of Cape Finisterre, Spain (44°51′N 27°45′W) by Admiral Hipper (Kriegsmarine) with the loss of all 108 people on board.

== 26 December ==
List of shipwrecks: 26 December 1940
Ship	State	Description
Baden	Kriegsmarine	World War II: The cargo ship was intercepted in the Atlantic Ocean (44°00′N 25°07′W) by HMS Bonaventure (Royal Navy) and was scuttled.
MAC 5	Royal Navy	World War II: The minesweeper attendant craft, a former BPB 60-foot-class motor torpedo boat, struck a mine and sank in the North Sea off the coast of Essex with the loss of four of her crew.
V-67 Tireremo Diritto	Regia Marina	World War II: The requisitioned 177 GRT trabaccolo on a passage from Tobruk for Bardia, was shelled and sunk in the Mediterranean Sea between Marsa Lucch and Ras Azzaz by HMAS Waterhen (Royal Australian Navy).
HMT True Accord	Royal Navy	The naval trawler sank in the North Sea off Happisburgh, Norfolk as a result of a collision with HMT Saronta (Royal Navy).
Waiotira	United Kingdom	World War II: The cargo ship was torpedoed and damaged in the Atlantic Ocean 150 nautical miles (280 km) west of Rockall, Inverness-shire (58°05′N 16°56′W) by U-95 (Kriegsmarine) and was abandoned. She was torpedoed and sunk the next day by U-38 (Kriegsmarine). One of the 90 people on board was killed. Survivors were rescued by HMS Mashona (Royal Navy). Waiotira was on a voyage from Sydney, New South Wales, Australia to a British port.

== 27 December ==
List of shipwrecks: 27 December 1940
Ship	State	Description
Araby	United Kingdom	World War II: The cargo ship struck a mine and sank in the Thames Estuary south west of Southend, Essex and 9/10 nautical mile (1.7 km) off the Nore Lightship ( Trinity House) with the loss of six of her 43 crew.
Ardabhan	United Kingdom	World War II: Convoy OB 263: The cargo ship was torpedoed and damaged in the Atlantic Ocean by U-38 (Kriegsmarine). She was later torpedoed and sunk by Enrico Tazzoli (Regia Marina) with the loss of all 40 crew.
Arnfinn Jarl	Norway	World War II: The cargo ship was bombed and sunk off Egersund, Rogaland by Royal Air Force aircraft. She was later raised, repaired and returned to service.
Kinnaird Head	United Kingdom	World War II: The coaster struck a mine and sank in the Thames Estuary north of Sheerness, Kent with the loss of six of her crew.
Risanger	Norway	World War II: The cargo ship was torpedoed and sunk in the Atlantic Ocean (12°30′N 21°30′W) by U-65 (Kriegsmarine). All 29 crew were rescued by Belinda (Norway).
Ronald	United States	The motorboat was destroyed by fire 0.25 nautical miles (0.46 km; 0.29 mi) off Point Highfield, Alaska Territory (56°29′15″N 132°23′15″W).

== 29 December ==
List of shipwrecks: 28 December 1940
Ship	State	Description
Adriana	Germany	World War II: The cargo ship struck a mine and sank in the North Sea off Freiburg.
Monarch	United Kingdom	World War II: The tug was bombed and sunk by Luftwaffe aircraft.
P.L.M.-23	Germany	The 5,417 GRT cargo ship ran aground in the Wadden Sea off Scharhörn in the storm, and was wrecked.
Proteus	Royal Hellenic Navy	World War II: The submarine was rammed by Antares (Regia Marina) and sank in the Adriatic Sea, east of Brindisi, Italy 40°31′N 19°02′E) with the loss of all 48 hands.
Sardegna	Italy	World War II: The 11,452 GRT troopship on a trip from Valona for Brindisi, was torpedoed and sunk in the Adriatic Sea, 11 nautical miles (20 km) west of Saseno (40°31′N 19°02′E) by Proteus (Royal Hellenic Navy) with the loss of 25 of the 262 people on board.

== 30 December ==
List of shipwrecks: 30 December 1940
Ship	State	Description
Agate	United Kingdom	The 824 GRT coaster on a trip from Goole for Belfast with a cargo of coal, ran aground at Cairns Point,Islay. She broke her back and was declared a total loss. Her crew were rescued.
HMT Bandolero	Royal Navy	The naval trawler collided with HMS Waterhen (Royal Navy) off Solum, Libya and sank. There were no casualties.
Baron Ardrossan	United Kingdom	The 3,896 GRT cargo ship on a trip from Calcutta for Hull with general cargo, ran aground on southeast corner of Sanday Island and was wrecked. Her 54 crew were saved.
Bodnant	United Kingdom	World War II: Convoy OB 264: The 5,342 GRT cargo ship on a trip from Hull for Freetown and Lagos with general cargo, was sunk in a collision with City of Bedford (United Kingdom) in the Atlantic Ocean (60°03′N 23°01′W). All aboard were rescued.
Calcium	United Kingdom	World War II: The coaster struck a mine and then collided with Sodium (United Kingdom) and later sank in Liverpool Bay (53°25′N 3°45′W) with the loss of one of her nine crew.
City of Bedford	United Kingdom	World War II: Convoy SL 58: The 6,402 GRT cargo ship on a trip from New York for Liverpool and Hull with general cargo, was sunk in a collision with Bodnant (United Kingdom) in the Atlantic Ocean (60°03′N 23°01′W) with the loss of 48 lives.

== 31 December ==
List of shipwrecks: 31 December 1940
Ship	State	Description
British Zeal	United Kingdom	World War II: The tanker was torpedoed and damaged in the Atlantic Ocean (15°40′N 20°43′W) by U-65 (Kriegsmarine) and was abandoned by her 50 crew. British Zeal was still afloat the next day and her crew reboarded her. She was later towed to Freetown, Sierra Leone by HMS Hudson (Royal Navy). British Zeal was repaired and returned to service in February 1942.
Buenos Aires	Sweden	World War II: The cargo ship was severely damaged by fire in a German air raid on Liverpool, Lancashire, United Kingdom. She was declared a constructive total loss and her engines were removed. Became the British stores ship Demeter in 1942.
Porjus	Germany	The cargo ship collided with another vessel and sank off Brunsbüttel.
Quinto	Italy	World War II: The 531 GRT coaster while navigating along the Montenegro coast from Trieste to San Giovanni di Medua with a cargo of gasoline in drums, was shelled and sunk in the Adriatic Sea, off Antivari, Yugoslavia by Katsonis (Royal Hellenic Navy) with the loss of all ten hands.
St. Fergus	United Kingdom	The 390 GRT coaster on a trip from Aberdeen for Stromness with general cargo, collided with Fidra (UK) and sank in the North Sea east of Rattray Head, Aberdeenshire. The master was lost while all other crewmen were rescued.
Valparaiso	Sweden	World War II: Convoy HX 97: The cargo ship straggled behind the convoy. She was torpedoed and sunk in the Atlantic Ocean north west of the Outer Hebrides, United Kingdom (60°01′N 23°00′W) by U-38 (Kriegsmarine) with the loss of all 35 people on board.

== Unknown date ==
List of shipwrecks: Unknown date 1940
Ship	State	Description
Narval	Free French Naval Forces	World War II: The Requin-class submarine struck a mine and sank in the Mediterranean Sea off Sfax, Tunisia with the loss of all 50 crew. The date of loss was probably between 13 and 16 December.
Rita	Australia	The ketch ran aground on Cape Barren Island, Tasmania, and was wrecked.
HMS Triton	Royal Navy	World War II: The T-class submarine was probably sunk in the Strait of Otranto by mines, possibly around 18 December, but could have been as early as 6 December.
