= SS Stolwijk =

Dutch cargo ship

History
- Name: Kongsgaard (1920–1921); Stolwijk (1921–1940)
- Owner: Olsen Brødrene – A. Gowert Olsen & J. C. Olsen, Stavanger (1920–1921); Stoomvaart Maatschappij Wijklijn – Erhardt & Dekkers, Rotterdam (1921–1940)
- Builder: Werf De Noord N.V., Alblasserdam
- Yard number: 123
- Launched: 30 October 1919
- Completed: January 1920
- Fate: Wrecked on 6 December 1940

General characteristics
- Type: Cargo ship
- Tonnage: 2,499 gross register tons (GRT)
- Length: 280 ft (85 m)
- Beam: 45 ft (14 m)
- Depth: 22 ft (6.7 m)
- Installed power: 263 nhp
- Propulsion: 1 x 3-cyl. triple expansion steam engine; Single shaft; 1 x screw; 2 x single boilers; 6 x corrugated furnaces
- Speed: 10 knots (12 mph)

SS Stolwijk, a Dutch cargo ship of 2,489 tons, was wrecked off the coast of County Donegal, Ireland on 6 December 1940. She was part of a Convoy SC 13 sailing from the Dominion of Newfoundland to Liverpool, England, when her rudder was damaged in a fierce storm. Attempts to rescue her by her destroyer escort failed and she went on the rocks off Tory Island, County Donegal, Ireland. Ten of her crew were lost but the remaining 18 were rescued the following day by Arranmore Lifeboat and landed safely in Burtonport. The rescue of the survivors was conducted in terrible weather conditions and both the RNLI and Queen Wilhelmina of the Netherlands awarded medals to the Irish lifeboat crew.

== Construction and history ==
The steamship was launched on 30 October 1919 by Werf De Noord at Alblasserdam as Kongsgaard for the Norwegian shipowners A/S Vestlandske Lloyd, managed by Brødrene Olsen (A G & J C Olsen) of Stavanger, and completed in January 1920. She measured 2,514 GRT and 1,535 NRT, with a cargo capacity of 4,100 DWT. Her length was 285.8 feet (87.11 m), beam 45.2 feet (13.78 m) and depth of hold 21.7 feet (6.61 m). The ship was powered by a triple expansion steam engine of 1200 IHP, made by NV Machinefabriek 'Kinderdijk', driving a single propeller.

In 1921, in a shipping recession, Kongsgaard's owners were bankrupt and the ship was sold to the Rotterdam shipping company NV Maatschappij SS Rijswijk, managed by the firm Erhardt & Dekkers. She was transferred form Norwegian to Dutch flag and re-measured as 2,499 GRT and 1,533 NRT, and with a cargo capacity of 4,175 DWT. Erhardt & Dekkers' ships were all named after towns and villages that ended with "wijk", in this case Stolwijk in South Holland.

Stolwijk ran aground at Åhus, Skåne County, Sweden, on 25 April 1922. She was refloated on 29 April 1922. In 1930 ownership was transferred to NV Stoomvaart Maatschappij 'Wijklijn', still under Erhardt & Dekkers management.

Stowijk was at sea when the Netherlands fell to Germany in May 1940 during World War II. She could not return to her home base of Rotterdam, but continued to operate as part of the large Dutch merchant marine.

== Other convoy activity ==
Stolwijk was part of outbound Convoy OB 188 in July 1940, steaming from Liverpool to North America; German submarines sank four of the convoy's ships. She returned in August 1940 as part of Convoy SC 01; again, four ships were lost during the journey. In October 1940 Stolwijk went back to North America as part of Convoy OB 232. She was returning as part of Slow Convoy SC 13 when she was wrecked.

== Stranding of Stolwijk ==
On a voyage from Corner Brook, Newfoundland to Glasgow, Stolwijk was one of 32 merchant ships in SC 13 escorted by six Royal Navy warships Clarkia, Heliotrope, Sabre, Scimitar, Shikari and Wellington. Violent storms beset the convoy from the outset. On 3 December 1940, the convoy diverted northwest to try to escape the storm and in so doing avoided being intercepted by German submarines that had been attacking convoy HX 90.

At 10:30 am on 5 December 1940, Stolwijk's rudder broke, and the many attempts at repair failed due to the weather. The anchor was dropped but the chain snapped and even going in full reverse did not halt the ship's steady drift toward the rocky Irish coastline. One of the escorting destroyers, HMS Sabre, risked her own safety in trying to rescue the crew of Stolwijk and was herself nearly destroyed. Stolwijk lost one of her lifeboats at this stage suffered damage to the other. A massive wave washed her radio operator overboard and Stolwijk hit the rocks at 11:30 pm. Nine sailors made an attempt to reach the lifeboat that had been washed overboard. According to the official court report, some made it to the lifeboat, but the storm capsized it and only three bodies were subsequently recovered. The remaining 18 survivors remained on board and radioed for help.

== Rescue of the survivors ==
Arranmore Lifeboat were notified late in the evening of 6 December 1940 of the ship in distress and given an approximate location. It was too late and stormy to depart immediately. The all-volunteer lifeboat crew departed Arranmore Island at 6:30 am on 7 December in a hurricane-force gale. Witnesses claim the lifeboat K.T.J.S. went over one wave and through the next on the outward journey. Stowijk had gone aground on rocks called Carraignacrubog ("The Rock of Crabs") just north of Inishdooey and south of Inisbeg. The National Archives in the Netherlands has this information of the rescue from the secretary of the RNLI (C.R. Satterthwaite) in April 1941:

- The lifeboat reached Stolwijk at noon in very stormy conditions.
- The crew of Stolwijk were huddled at the stern of the ship and waves were breaking over them.
- The lifeboat anchored to windward and drifted close to the boat and then fired a line to the crew so a breeches buoy could be used to transfer the men. This procedure was repeated three times as the line kept breaking. It took four hours for all eighteen survivors to be rescued in this way, each spending upwards of five minutes in the water.
- It took the lifeboat a further five hours to reach Burtonport on the mainland during which she was nearly swamped by heavy seas.
- The coxswain John Boyle was awarded the Gold Medal by the RNLI, the Institution's highest award for gallantry.
- The motor mechanic Teague Ward was awarded the RNLI Silver Medal, with the Bronze Medal awarded to the other crew members: Philip Boyle, acting second-coxswain, Philip Byrne, acting bowman, Neil Byrne, assistant motor-mechanic, Patrick O’Donnell, Joseph Rodgers, and Bryan Gallagher. Queen Wilhelmina of the Netherlands awarded the Dutch gold medal for gallantry in saving life to Coxswain John Boyle, the silver medal to Teague Ward and the bronze medal to each of the six other members of the crew.

== Immediate aftermath ==
The three bodies recovered following the tragedy were originally buried in the Church of Ireland graveyard in Killult (Donegal, Ireland). In October 2000, the bodies were exhumed and re-interred at the National Cemetery of Honours in Loenen (Netherlands).

Sabre put into Derry, with sea damage on 7 December 1940. Her commander, Lieutenant Commander Brian Dean, suffered a fractured skull in the rescue attempt and was retired from the sea. Sabre sailed to Belfast for repairs and resumed activity on 18 January 1941 under the command of Peter Gretton.

The British ship SS Ashcrest 5,652 tons, was also part of SC 13 and also experienced a broken rudder during the storm. She radioed for help but the message was intercepted by a German submarine. She was torpedoed by U-140 on 8 December 1940 with the loss of all 38 men.

== 75th anniversary song: "I'll Go" ==
On 7 December 2015, Arranmore publican and singer-songwriter, Jerry Early (son of Andrew Early, the last eye witness on Arranmore to remember the day, who knew the lifeboat crew and story well) released a song on iTunes called "I'll Go", to commemorate the actions of the lifeboat crew. He co-wrote the song with his cousin John Gallagher. It has received considerable airplay in Donegal since the launch and all proceeds were being donated towards the creation of a permanent monument on Arranmore Island. In September 2020, the Irish duo, Ye Vagabond, released "The Ballad of Stolwijk Rescue", written and presented in a 'radio ballad' format by musician Brían MacGloinn.

== Permanent monument ==
On 6 August 2017, a new permanent monument was unveiled at Arranmore, commemorating the rescue.
