= Convoy HX 90 =

Convoy during naval battles of the Second World War

- Part of The Battle of the Atlantic of the Second World War
- Map of the North Atlantic Ocean
Date	1–3 December 1940
Location	Western Approaches
Result	Axis victory

Belligerents
(Nazi Germany) Germany; Italy	United Kingdom; Canada

Commanders and leaders
Karl Dönitz	Escort: M. S. Townsend; Convoy commodore: V. P. Alleyne

Strength
7 U-boats; 3 Italian submarines	41 ships 5 escorts

Casualties and losses
none	11 ships sunk (73,495 GRT); 174 killed

Convoy HX 90 (1–3 December 1940) was a North Atlantic convoy of the HX series in the Second World War which ran during the Battle of the Atlantic in both world wars.

== Background ==
Convoy HX 90 was an eastbound convoy of 41 ships which sailed from the port of Halifax in Nova Scotia, Canada, on 21 November 1940, bound for Liverpool in England, carrying war materials. The convoy was made up of contingents from Halifax, Sydney and Bermuda was led by convoy commodore V. P. Alleyne in Botavon.

The escort for the crossing had been sparse, as was common at this stage of the campaign and the Western Approaches escort did not generally meet incoming convoys until south of Iceland, reckoned to be the limit of U-boat endurance. For Convoy HX 90, the ocean escort was HMS Laconia, an armed merchant cruiser, due to rendezvous with the Western Approaches escort on 2 December.

Also at sea were Convoy SC 13, to the north of Convoy HX 90, also heading east, while heading towards them was the westbound Convoy OB 251. To the south, heading to the United Kingdom from Gibraltar, was Convoy HG 47. Ranged against them was a wolfpack of seven U-boats, reinforced by three Italian submarines of BETASOM operating with them in the Atlantic Ocean. These were deployed in a patrol line at the fringe of the Western Approaches, hoping to intercept eastbound convoys before they met their escorts.

== Action ==
On 1 December 1940, about 500 nmi (930 km; 580 mi) south of Iceland, Convoy HX 90 was sighted by U-101 (Kapitänleutnant Ernst Mengersen) which reported its position. Mengersen was ordered to shadow and report. During the day, the first Western Approaches escort, the Royal Navy destroyer HMS Viscount (Lieutenant Commander M. S. Townsend) arrived from Convoy OB 251. That evening, Mengersen was no longer able to resist attacking. He fired all twelve of his torpedoes, claiming four ships sunk and two damaged, sinking Apalachee, Kavak and Lady Glanely and damaging Loch Ranza.

Just after midnight on 2 December, U-47 (Gunther Prien) arrived and sank Ville D'Arlon, which had straggled from the convoy and damaged Conch. Prien attacked Dunsley, with his deck gun but was driven off by one of the escorts. Later U-95 joined in, attacking the damaged Conch, which was again hit but remained afloat. U-99 (Otto Kretschmer) was en route to join the attack but encountered the armed merchant cruiser HMS Forfar on her way to join Convoy OB 251 as ocean escort. Kretschmer hit Forfar five times with torpedoes; she sank with the loss of 172 of her crew, leaving 21 survivors. U-43 also missed the convoy, but fell in with Convoy OB 251, sinking two ships. The Argo, having attacked Convoy HG 43, also missed Convoy HX 90 but found Convoy SC 13, attacking and sinking one ship.

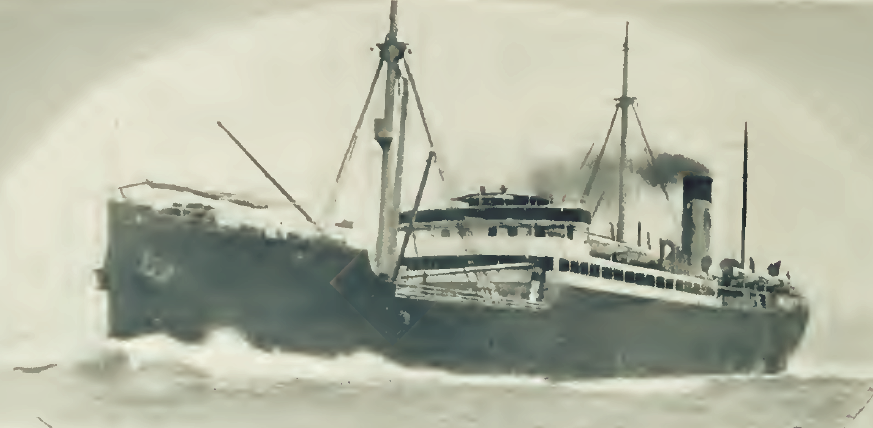
SS Wilhelmina photographed before the war

On the morning of 2 December, the pack was joined by U-52, which sank Tasso and Goodleigh. The convoy was joined the sloop HMS Folkestone and the corvette HMS Gentian, also from Convoy OB 251. They were assisted by the Royal Canadian Navy destroyer HMCS St. Laurent, which had been travelling with Forfar but had detached to reinforce the escorts of Convoy HX 90. Viscount and St Laurent attacked numerous asdic contacts, making thirteen depth-charge attacks over four hours. No U-boats were hit but all were kept submerged and silent, allowing Convoy HX 90 to escape.

Later that evening the convoy was sighted again by U-94; during an attack on the night of 2/3 December and sank Stirlingshire and Wilhelmina. Also that night, U-99 found and sank a straggler, Victoria City, though other sources say she was sunk by U-140 and the damaged Conch, which she also sank. There were no further U-boat attacks on Convoy HX 90, though on 3 December W. Hendrik was bombed by German aircraft and sunk. The convoy met its local escort on 5 December and arrived in Liverpool later that day.

== Aftermath ==
Rear Admiral Karl Dönitz, the Befehlshaber der U-Boote (BdU, commander of U-boats) was delighted with the attack, believing his U-boats had sunk eighteen ships of over 120,000 Gross Register Tons (GRT). The confirmed loss to Convoy HX 90 was eleven ships of 73,495 GRT; other sources give 73,958 GRT. During the same period the pack had also sunk Forfar, two ships from Convoy OB 251, another from Convoy SC 13 and had damaged an escort from Convoy HG 47. None of the attacking U-boats had been sunk or damaged. Thirty ships of Convoy HX 90 arrived safely, as did 41 ships of Convoy SC 13, the 30 ships of Convoy HG 47 and 31 ships of Convoy OB 251. The attack on Convoy HX 90 was a defeat for the Allies, and one of the more serious convoy losses of the Atlantic campaign.

== Table ==
Convoy losses
Date	Name	Nationality	GRT	Notes
1 December 1940	Appalachee	United Kingdom	8,824	Sunk, 1 December, U-101, 7†, 32 saved, 54°30′N, 20°W
2 December 1940	Kavak	United Kingdom	2,782	Sunk 2 December, U-101, 25†, 16 saved, 55°03′N, 18°04′W
2 December 1940	Lady Glanely	United Kingdom	5,497	Sunk, 2 December, U-101, 32† 0 saved, 55°N, 20°W
2 December 1940	Ville D'Arlon	Belgium	7,555	Sunk, U-47, 56†
2 December 1940	Tasso	United Kingdom	1,586	Sunk, U-52, 5†
2 December 1940	Goodleigh	United Kingdom	5,448	Sunk, U-52, no†
2 December 1940	Stirlingshire	United Kingdom	6,022	Sunk, 2December, U-94 all 74 saved, 55°36′N, 16°22′W
2 December 1940	Wilhelmina	United Kingdom	6,725	Sunk, U-94, 5†
3 December 1940	Conch	United Kingdom	8,376	Damaged, U-47, U-95 sunk U-99, 54°40′N, 19°W, all saved
3 December 1940	Victoria City	United Kingdom	4,739	Sunk, 2 December, U-140, all 43†, W of North Channel
3 December 1940	SS W. Hendrik	United Kingdom	4,360	Sunk by aircraft, 5†
