= German submarine U-140 =

U-140 may refer to one of the following German submarines:

- SM U-140, a Type U 139 submarine launched in 1917 and that served in the First World War until surrendered on 23 February 1919; used for testing by the United States; sunk by destroyer Dickerson at Cape Charles, Virginia on 22 July 1921
  - During the First World War, Germany also had this submarine with a similar name:
    - SM UB-140, a Type UB III submarine laid down but unfinished at the end of the war; broken up on the slip in 1919
- German submarine U-140 (1940), a Type IID submarine that served in the Second World War until scuttled on 2 May 1945; wreck broken up at later date
