= SS Empire Clough =

World War II merchant ship of the United Kingdom

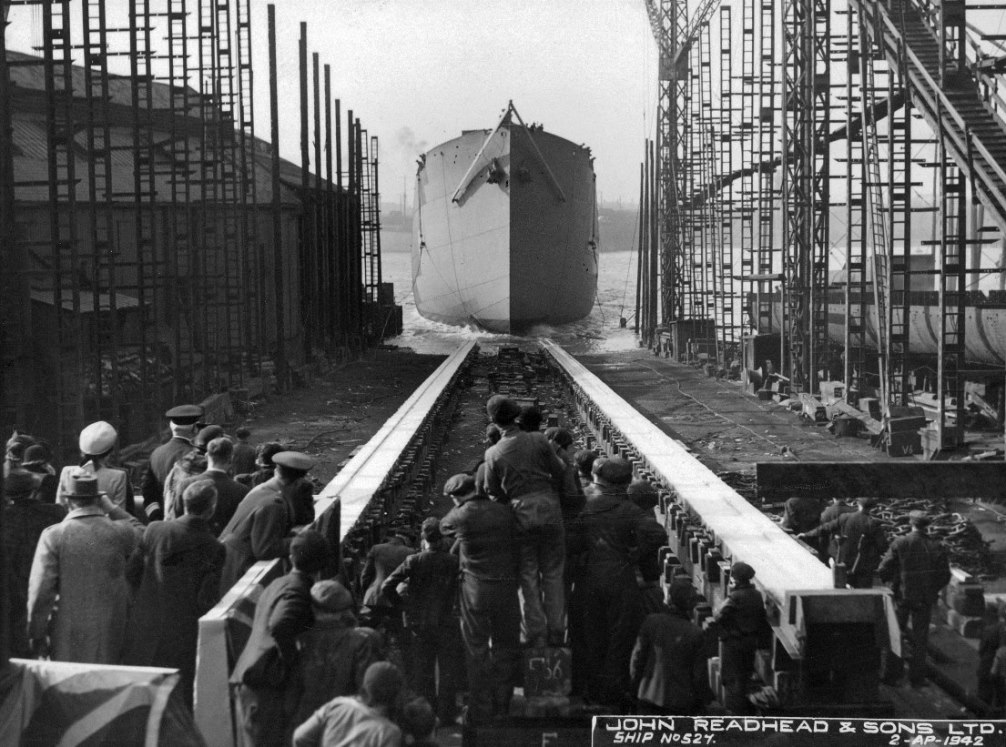
- Launch of the cargo ship Empire Clough at the shipyard of John Readhead & Sons Ltd, South Shields, 2 April 1942

History
- Name: Empire Clough
- Owner: Ministry of War Transport
- Operator: Larringa Steamship Co Ltd
- Port of registry: (United Kingdom) South Shields
- Builder: John Readhead & Sons Ltd
- Yard number: 527
- Launched: 2 April 1942
- Completed: June 1942
- Out of service: 10 June 1942
- Identification: Code Letters BDVX; United Kingdom Official Number 168655
- Fate: Torpedoed and sunk

General characteristics
- Type: Cargo ship
- Tonnage: 6,147 GRT; 4,251 NRT
- Length: 405 ft 8 in (123.65 m)
- Beam: 53 ft 5 in (16.28 m)
- Depth: 32 ft 8 in (9.96 m)
- Installed power: Triple expansion steam engine
- Propulsion: Screw propeller
- Crew: 43, plus 6 DEMS gunners

Location of the sinking of Empire Clough.

Empire Clough was a 6,147 GRT cargo ship which was built in 1942 by John Readhead & Sons Ltd of South Shields for the Ministry of War Transport (MoWT). She was torpedoed and sunk on her maiden voyage.

== Description ==
The ship was built as yard number 527. She was launched on 2 April 1942 and completed in June 1942.

The ship was 405 feet 8 inches (123.65 m) long, with a beam of 53 feet 6 inches (16.31 m) and a depth of 32 feet 8 inches (9.96 m). She had a GRT of 6,147 and a NRT of 4,251.

The ship was propelled by a triple expansion steam engine, which had cylinders of 23 1/2 inches (60 cm), 37 1/2 inches (95 cm) and 68 inches (170 cm) diameter by 48 inches (120 cm) stroke. The engine was built by Foster, Yates & Thompson Ltd, Blackburn.

== History ==
Empire Clough was built for the Ministry of War Transport and placed under the management of the Larringa Steamship Co Ltd. Her port of registry was South Shields and she was allocated the Code Letters BDVX and United Kingdom Official Number 168655.

On her maiden voyage, Empire Clough was a member of Convoy ON 100, which departed from Loch Ewe on 2 June 1942 bound for Boston and New York. At 03:40 on 10 June 1942, Empire Clough was torpedoed by U-94 with the loss of five crew. The ship was abandoned, with the 44 survivors being rescued by HMS Dianthus and the Portuguese trawler Argus. They were landed at St John's, Newfoundland and in Greenland respectively. Empire Clough sank at 51°50′N 35°00′W. Those lost on Empire Clough are commemorated at the Tower Hill Memorial in London.
