= HMS Malvernian =

British steamship converted to an ocean boarding vessel

Coordinates: 47°37′N 19°07′W

History

United Kingdom
- Name: Malvernian
- Namesake: Malvern, Worcestershire
- Owner: Ellerman Lines
- Operator: 1937: Ellerman & Papayanni Lines; 1941: (United Kingdom) Royal Navy
- Port of registry: (United Kingdom) Liverpool
- Builder: Wm Gray & Co, West Hartlepool
- Yard number: 1072
- Launched: 25 February 1937
- Completed: September 1937
- Reclassified: 1941: ocean boarding vessel
- Identification: UK official number 164324; call sign GZMM; 1940: pennant number F 102
- Fate: Sunk by air attack, July 1941

General characteristics
- Type: Cargo ship
- Tonnage: 3,133 GRT, 1,397 NRT
- Length: 345.6 ft (105.3 m)
- Beam: 50.1 ft (15.3 m)
- Draught: 22 ft 2 1/2 in (6.77 m)
- Depth: 20.7 ft (6.3 m)
- Decks: 1
- Installed power: 606 NHP
- Propulsion: triple expansion steam engine, low pressure turbine, one screw
- Speed: 13 knots (24 km/h)
- Crew: 1941: 164
- Sensors & processing systems: wireless direction finding; echo sounding device
- Armament: 2 × 6-inch guns; 1 × 12-pounder gun
- Notes: sister ships: Belgravian, Ionian, Florian

HMS Malvernian was an Ellerman Lines cargo steamship that was built in 1937. In January 1941 she was converted into an ocean boarding vessel. That July she sank after a German air attack crippled her in the Atlantic Ocean.

This was the second Ellerman Lines ship called Malvernian. The first was built in 1924 as City of Kobe, renamed Malvernian later that year and changed back to City of Kobe in 1927. A mine sank City of Kobe in 1939.

== Building ==
William Gray & Company built Malvernian in its West Hartlepool yard. She was launched on 25 February 1937 and made her sea trials on 3 June, but was not completed until that September. Her registered length was 345.6 ft (105.3 m), her beam was 50.1 ft (15.3 m), her depth was 20.7 ft (6.3 m), and her tonnages were 3,133 GRT and 1,397 NRT.

Malvernian had one screw. Gray's Central Marine Engineering Works built her engines. Her main engine was a steam triple expansion engine. It was supplemented by a Bauer-Wach low-pressure exhaust steam turbine, which ran on exhaust steam from the low pressure cylinder of her piston engine. Via double reduction gearing and a Föttinger fluid coupling the turbine drove the same propeller shaft as her piston engine. Between them the two engines were rated at 606 NHP and gave her a speed of 13 knots (24 km/h).

In September 1937 Gray delivered Malvernian to the Ellerman & Papayanni Lines subsidiary of Ellerman Lines. Over the next two years Gray built three sister ships for Ellerman & Papayanni Lines: Belgravian in 1937, Ionian in 1938 and Florian in 1939–40.

== Second World War ==
In the Second World War Malvernian at first continued in merchant trade. She sailed in convoys between Gibraltar and Liverpool until May 1940. In July 1940 Malvernian crossed the Atlantic to Montreal, and in August she returned in Convoy HX 62. Later that month she sailed from the Firth of Forth to Hull, and in January and February 1941 she sailed from the Firth of Forth to Oban.

In January 1941 the Admiralty requisitioned Malvernian for conversion into an ocean boarding vessel. She was armed with two 6-inch guns and one anti-aircraft 12-pounder gun. She was commissioned as HMS Malvernian with the pennant number F 102.

WBS 8 August Wriedt, which Malvernian captured

On 29 May 1941 HMS Malvernian intercepted and captured the German weather ship WBS 8 August Wriedt in the Bay of Biscay. Malvernian sent a prize crew aboard, which took August Wriedt to St John's, Newfoundland.

On 1 July 1941 Luftwaffe bombed Malvernian in the North Atlantic, killing four officers and 20 ratings, wounding two officers and setting her afire. Survivors abandoned ship in four lifeboats, but Malvernian remained afloat and adrift until 19 July.

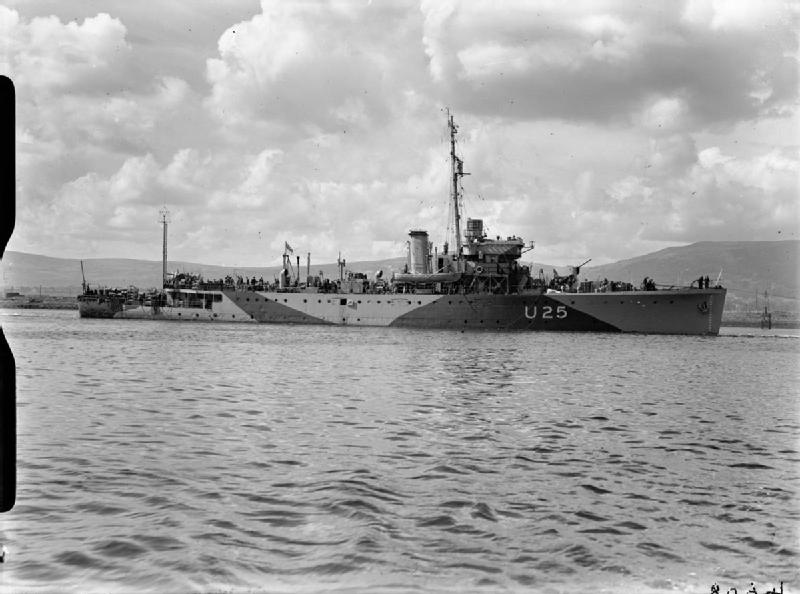
HMS Scarborough, which rescued 57 of Malvernian's survivors

The sloop HMS Scarborough searched for survivors, found one lifeboat and rescued its 57 occupants. Kriegsmarine minesweepers found another lifeboat and captured its occupants.

The remaining two lifeboats reached Spain independently. One, carrying Malvernian's commander, Cdr JWB Robertson, RNR and 31 of his crew and reached A Coruña in on 21 July. The other, carrying 21 survivors, reached Vigo on 22 July.

== Bibliography ==
- Clarkson, John; Fenton, Roy (1993). Ellerman Lines. Ships in Focus. Preston: John and Marion Clarkson. ISBN 0-952-1179-6-7.
- Collard, Ian (2014). Ellerman Lines Remembering a Great British Company. Stroud: The History Press. ISBN 978-0-7524-8963-6.
