= German weather ship WBS 8 August Wriedt =

- HMS Maria in May 1945 on the harbor quay in Maassluis, Netherlands

History

Germany
- Name: Dolly Kühling (1929–35); August Wriedt (1935–41)
- Owner: Hochseefisherei J Wieting AG (1929-32); Hansa-Hochseefischerei (1932–34); Nordsee Deutsche Hochseefisherei (1934–40); Kriegsmarine (1940-41)
- Port of registry: (Weimar Republic) Bremerhaven, Germany (1929–32); (Weimar Republic) Cuxhaven, Germany (1932-35); (Nazi Germany) Cuxhaven, Germany (1935–40); (Nazi Germany) Kriegsmarine (1940–41)
- Builder: Schiffswerft von Henry Koch AG, Lübeck
- Yard number: 277
- Launched: 6 March 1929
- Completed: March 1929
- Identification: Code Letters QVMR (1929–34); Code Letters DHFI (1934–40); WBS 8 (1940–41)
- Captured: 29 May 1941 by HMS Malvernian

United Kingdom
- Name: HMS Maria (1941–50)
- Owner: (United Kingdom) Royal Navy (1941–50)
- Acquired: 29 May 1941
- Commissioned: March 1942
- Decommissioned: 1950
- Fate: Sold for scrap, June 1951

General characteristics
- Displacement: As built: 372 GRT; 140 NRT; After 1937 rebuild: 407 GRT
- Length: As built: 46.15 metres (151 ft 5 in); After 1937 rebuild: 50.70 metres (166 ft 4 in)
- Beam: 7.85 metres (25 ft 9 in)
- Depth: 3.56 metres (11 ft 8 in)
- Installed power: Triple expansion steam engine, 88nhp
- Propulsion: Single screw propeller
- Speed: 11 knots (20 km/h)

August Wriedt was a weather ship built in 1929 as the fishing vessel Dolly Kühling. She was renamed August Wriedt in 1935. She was requisitioned by the Kriegsmarine in 1940 and captured by HMS Malvernian on 29 May 1941. She served as HMS Maria, a wreck dispersal vessel, until 1950 and was scrapped in 1951.

== Description ==
The ship was 46.15 metres (151 ft 5 in) long, with a beam of 7.75 metres (25 ft 5 in). She had a depth of 3.56 metres (11 ft 8 in). She was assessed at 372 GRT, 140 NRT. She was powered by a triple expansion steam engine driving a single screw propeller, which gave her a speed 11 knots (20 km/h). The engine, rated at 88nhp, was built by the Ottensener Maschinenbau GmbH, Altona, Hamburg.

She was rebuilt in 1937, which increased her length to 50.70 metres (166 ft 4 in) and her tonnage to 407 GRT.

== History ==
Dolly Kühling was built as yard number 277 in 1929 by the Schiffswerft von Henry Koch AG, Lübeck as a fishing trawler for the Hochseefisherei J. Wieting AG. She was launched on 6 March 1929 and was completed later that month. Her port of registry was Bremerhaven and the Code Letters QVMR were allocated. In 1932, she was sold to the Hansa-Hochseefischerei. Her port of registry was changed to Cuxhaven. In 1934, she was sold to the Nordsee Deutsche Hochseefisherei, Cuxhaven. Her Code Letters were changed to DHFI. She was renamed August Wriedt on 21 May 1935. On 22 February 1937, a crewman was killed in an accident at Aberdeen, United Kingdom when his clothing became caught in a winch.

In 1940, August Wriedt was requisitioned by the Kriegsmarine. She served as the weather ship WBS 8 August Wriedt. On 29 May 1941, August Wriedt was intercepted and captured in the Atlantic Ocean by HMS Malvernian shortly after leaving Bordeaux, Gironde, France. a prize crew took her to St. John's, Newfoundland. She was commissioned into the Royal Navy as HMS Maria in 1942, serving as a wreck dispersal vessel. HMS Maria was sold out of service in 1950. She was scrapped in June 1951.
