= SS Florian =

Coordinates: 61°14′N 12°05′W

History

United Kingdom
- Name: Florian
- Owner: Ellerman Lines
- Operator: Ellerman & Papayanni Lines
- Port of registry: Liverpool
- Builder: Wm Gray & Co, West Hartlepool
- Yard number: 1099
- Launched: 29 January 1940
- Completed: April 1940
- Identification: UK official number 166292; call sign GBZB
- Fate: Sunk by torpedo, 20 January 1941

General characteristics
- Type: Cargo ship
- Tonnage: 3,174 GRT, 1,486 NRT
- Length: 345.7 ft (105.4 m)
- Beam: 50.1 ft (15.3 m)
- Draught: 22 ft 2 1/2 in (6.77 m)
- Depth: 20.7 ft (6.3 m)
- Decks: 1
- Installed power: 606 NHP
- Propulsion: triple expansion steam engine, low pressure turbine, one screw
- Speed: 13 knots (24 km/h)
- Crew: 42 + 2 DEMS gunners
- Sensors & processing systems: wireless direction finding; echo sounding device
- Notes: sister ships: Malvernian, Belgravian, Ionian

SS Florian was an Ellerman Lines cargo steamship that was launched in 1940 and completed that year. A U-boat sank her with all hands in 1941 in the Battle of the Atlantic.

This was the first Ellerman Lines ship called Florian. The second was a motor ship that was built in 1955, sold in 1971 and renamed Maldive Loyalty, and scrapped in 1982.

== Building ==
Florian was one of a set of four sister ships that William Gray & Company built for the Ellerman & Papayanni Lines subsidiary of Ellerman Lines. The first was Malvernian in 1937. She was followed by Belgravian in 1937, Ionian in 1938 and finally Florian in 1939–40.

William Gray & Co built Florian at West Hartlepool yard, launching her on 26 January 1940 and completing her that April. Her registered length was 345.7 ft (105.4 m), her beam was 50.1 ft (15.3 m), her depth was 20.7 ft (6.3 m), and her tonnages were 3,174 GRT and 1,486 NRT.

Florian had one screw. Gray's Central Marine Engineering Works built her engines. Her main engine was a steam triple expansion engine. It was supplemented by a Bauer-Wach low-pressure exhaust steam turbine, which ran on exhaust steam from the low pressure cylinder of her piston engine. Via double reduction gearing and a Föttinger fluid coupling the turbine drove the same propeller shaft as her piston engine. Between them the two engines were rated at 606 NHP and gave her a speed of 13 knots (24 km/h).

== Service and loss ==
On 17 April 1940 Florian left Middlesbrough on her maiden voyage. She sailed to the Eastern Mediterranean via Hull, Southend, Gibraltar and Malta. She visited ports in Egypt, Palestine and Cyprus in May 1940 before returning via Gibraltar to Liverpool. Apart from her time in the Mediterranean, Florian sailed mostly in convoys.

After France capitulated in June 1940 Florian was transferred to transatlantic service. On 3 July she left Liverpool for New York, where she arrived on 16 July. She then made two round trips between New York and Hull, sailing in the HX convoys HX 61 and HX 75 from Halifax, Nova Scotia to the Firth of Forth for her eastbound crossings.

Florian spent Christmas 1940 and saw in the New Year 1941 in Hull. On 9 January she left the Humber in ballast for New York. She sailed with Convoy FN 378 from Spurn to the Forth and Convoy EN 56/1 from the Forth around the north coast of Scotland, but then sailed independently to cross the Atlantic.

Early on the evening of 19 January U-94 started to chase Florian. At 0042 hrs in 20 January one torpedo fired by U-94 hit Florian amidships, sinking her about 140 nautical miles (260 km) west-southwest of the Faroe Islands. She sank stern-first in 42 seconds, killing all 42 members of her crew and her two DEMS gunners.

== Bibliography ==
- Clarkson, John; Fenton, Roy (1993). Ellerman Lines. Ships in Focus. Preston: John and Marion Clarkson. ISBN 0-952-1179-6-7.
- Collard, Ian (2014). Ellerman Lines Remembering a Great British Company. Stroud: The History Press. ISBN 978-0-7524-8963-6.
