= SS Ville d'Arlon =

Ocean liner sunk in World War II

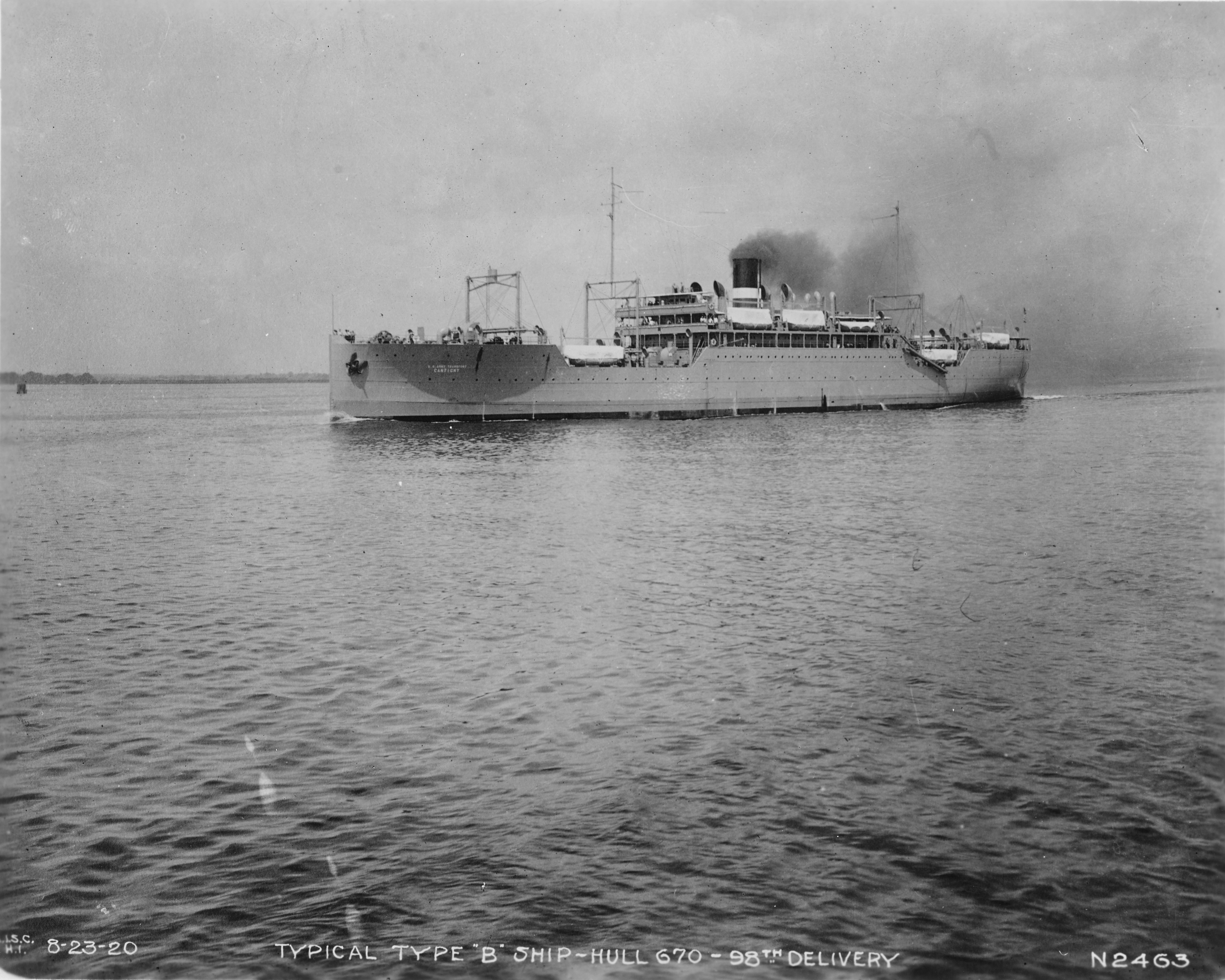
- A Design 1024 similar to USAT Cambrai, 1920.

History

United States
- Name: USAT Cambrai
- Launched: 6 December 1919
- Commissioned: 30 October 1920
- Fate: Sold to United States Lines, 1931
- Name: American Traveler (1931); Ville d'Arlon (1940)
- Fate: Sunk by U-47, 2 December 1940.

General characteristics as troopship
- Tonnage: 7,555 GRT
- Speed: 14.5 knots (26.9 km/h; 16.7 mph)

SS Ville d'Arlon was a Design 1024 passenger ship that was built at Hog Island, Philadelphia. She was laid down as Shohokin, EFC Hull 669, and launched as Mount Wolf on 6 December 1919. She was delivered to the U.S. Shipping Board on 30 October 1920 as the troopship USAT Cambrai. She was named in honor of the Battle of Cambrai that took place in World War I.

She was sold to the United States Lines and gained the name SS American Traveler, before being sold to Belgian owners in 1940 and renamed Ville d'Arlon. During the Second World War, she was torpedoed and sunk by the German submarine U-47 on 2 December 1940 while sailing as a straggler from Convoy HX 90, with the loss of all 57 people aboard.

== History ==
After being delivered to the United States Shipping Board on October 30, 1920, she was assigned to the U.S. Army Transport Service, being assigned to the Atlantic fleet. Her homeport was at the Brooklyn Army Terminal.

Her maiden voyage for the Army Transport Service was on December 10, 1920. After starting her service, USAT Cambrai generally serviced the New York-Antwerp and the New York-San Juan-Panama routes between 1920 and 1921, when she was laid up on June 6, 1921 in New York. She was recommissioned on November 10, 1921, and was transferred to the Army Transport Service its Pacific fleet in 1922, with her new homeport being at Fort Mason, California.

She was then assigned to service the San Francisco to Honolulu route between 1922 and 1931. During this time, she transported earthquake relief supplies to Yokohama after the Great Kantō Earthquake, and beginning November 1928, primarily made voyages between Fort Mason and the Brooklyn Army Terminal, with occasional voyages to Panama, Puerto Rico and the Philippines.

She struck a reef at Corinto, Nicaragua in 1929. The damage was not severe, but it did require repairs in a drydock when the ship returned to San Francisco.

On October 27, 1931, Cambrai was turned over to the United States Shipping board and sold to the United States Lines, becoming the SS American Traveler.

In 1939, President Franklin D. Roosevelt, through the Neutrality Acts laws, forbade American ships to operate in belligerent waters, after the rising conflicts in Europe. To circumvent this ruling, the United States Lines formed a company, S.A. Maritime Anversoise, in Antwerp, Belgium. American Traveler was transferred to it in 1940 and gained the name Ville d'Arlon, to continue calling port in Europe. This inadvertently pulled the ship into World War II.

On July 19, 1940, Ville d'Arlon saved 9 survivors on a life raft from Gyda, which had sank within under a minute the day prior.

Ville d'Arlon landed in New York on July 26. Two of the crew members of Gyda were injured and were given medical treatment upon arrival.

== Sinking ==
Ville d'Arlon was taking part in Convoy HX 90, when she underwent steering troubles and had to stop, becoming a straggler in the process. Subsequently, she was spotted by the German U-Boat U-47, and one G7e torpedo was fired. She was hit on the starboard side, aft from midships, and sank quickly with a heavy list around 250 miles southwest of Rockall. Of the 57 people aboard (56 crew and 1 passenger), none survived.

== See also ==
- SS Ville d'Anvers
