= USS Wilhelmina =

United States Navy transport vessel

Coordinates: 55°43′N 15°6′W

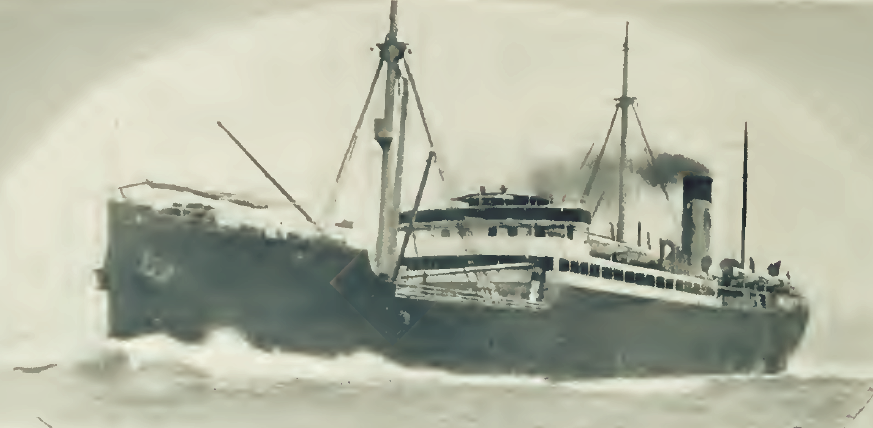
- Wilhelmina in commercial service with Matson.

History

United States
- Name: SS Wilhelmina
- Namesake: Queen Wilhelmina
- Owner: Matson Navigation Company
- Route: San Francisco–Honolulu
- Builder: Newport News Shipbuilding and Drydock Co.; Newport News, Virginia
- Launched: 18 September 1909
- Completed: 7 December 1909
- In service: 1910
- Out of service: 1917
- Fate: requisitioned by the United States government
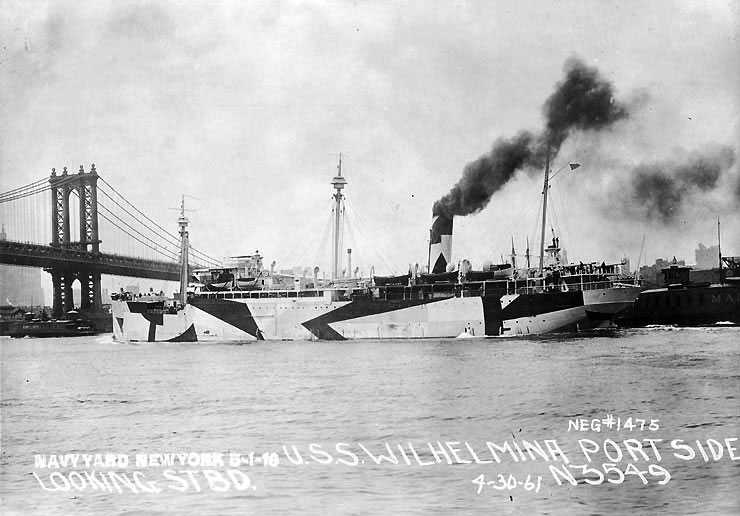
- USS Wilhelmina (ID-2168) underway in New York Harboron 1 May 1918

United States
- Name: USS Wilhelmina (ID-2106)
- Commissioned: 26 January 1918
- Decommissioned: 16 August 1919
- Stricken: 16 August 1919
- Fate: Returned to Matson

United States
- Name: SS Wilhelmina
- Owner: Matson Navigation Company
- In service: 1919
- Out of service: 1930s
- Fate: Sold

United Kingdom
- Name: SS Wilhelmina
- Owner: Ministry of War Transport
- Operator: Douglas & Ramsay
- Acquired: 1940
- Homeport: Glasgow
- Fate: Sunk on 2 December 1940

General characteristics
- Displacement: 13,250
- Length: 451 ft 2 in (137.52 m)
- Beam: 54 ft 1 in (16.48 m)
- Draft: 26 ft 6 in (8.08 m) (mean)
- Speed: 16.5 knots (30.6 km/h)
- Complement: 271 (as USS Wilhelmina)
- Armament: 4 × 6-inch (150 mm) guns; 2 × 1-pounder guns; 4 × depth charges

USS Wilhelmina (ID-2168) was a transport for the United States Navy during World War I. Built in 1909 for Matson Navigation Company as SS Wilhelmina, she sailed from the West Coast of the United States to Hawaii until 1917. After her war service, she was returned to Matson and resumed Pacific Ocean service. In the late 1930s she was laid up in San Francisco, California, until sold to a British shipping company in 1940. While a part of a convoy sailing from Halifax, Nova Scotia, to Liverpool, she was sunk by U-94 on 2 December 1940.

== Early history ==
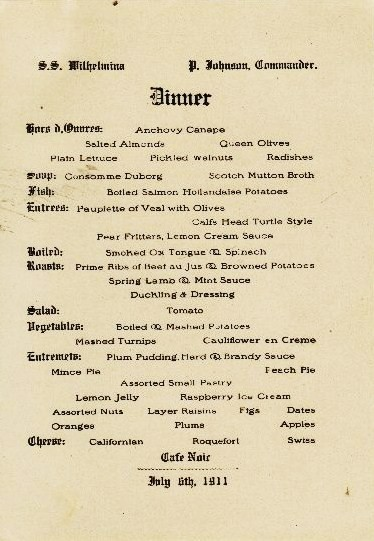
Dinner menu, 6 July 1911

Wilhelmina—a steel-hulled, single-screw, passenger and cargo steamer built at Newport News, Virginia, by the Newport News Shipbuilding and Drydock Co. for the Matson Navigation Company—was launched on 18 September 1909 and departed her builders' yard on 7 December of that year. Under the Matson flag, Wilhelmina conducted regular runs between San Francisco, California, and Honolulu, Hawaii, carrying passengers and cargo between 1910 and 1917. SS Wilhelmina is referenced in a book called From Job to Job Around the World, written by Alfred C.B. Fletcher. Gutenburg EBook #55336.

== World War I ==
Inspected by the Navy at the 12th Naval District, San Francisco, on 18 June 1917—two months after the United States entered World War I—the steamship was later taken over by the United States Shipping Board on 1 December. Soon afterwards she sailed for Chile where she obtained a cargo of nitrates. Delivering that cargo at Norfolk, Virginia., Wilhelmina shifted to New York on 23 January 1918. Given Identification Number 2168, the ship was then taken over by the Navy and apparently commissioned on 26 January. Wilhelmina was diverted to "special duty" and made her first voyage to France soon afterwards, departing New York with a general cargo on 1 February and returning on 26 March. Upon her return, she shifted to the New York Navy Yard, Brooklyn, New York, where she was taken in hand and converted to a troopship for service with the Cruiser and Transport Force. When her extant deck logs begin, her commanding officer is listed as Commander William T. Tarrant.

On 10 May 1918, Wilhelmina sailed out of New York on the first of six wartime voyages to France and back prior to the 11 November 1918 armistice. During these passages, Wilhelmina carried 11,053 troops to France to strengthen the American Expeditionary Force (AEF). The transport's half-dozen trips were all made safely as far as she was concerned, although not totally without incident.

While in convoy with six other troopships and four destroyers, Wilhelmina was present when the transport USS Covington was torpedoed on 1 July 1918. Nearly a month later, on 30 July 1918, one of Wilhelmina's lookouts spotted what he thought to be a submarine periscope at 07:30. Going to general quarters, the transport surged ahead and opened fire to drive the submarine away. A short while later, when the periscope reappeared, Wilhelmina again fired at it, with the shell falling 50 yards (46 meters) short.

Two weeks later, while Wilhelmina and USS Pastores were steaming under the protection of the destroyer USS Hull, the erstwhile Matson steamship again went to general quarters to drive away what looked like a submarine. Shortly after 20:00 on 14 August, while Wilhelmina's crew and passengers were holding an abandon-ship drill, a lookout spotted what looked like a submarine periscope 200 yards (180 m) from the ship and just forward of the port beam. The captain of the transport ordered her helm put over to starboard soon after the sighting, as the submarine moved away on an opposite course. The one-pounder on the port wing of the signal bridge barked out two shots, both missing. Three shots from the after port 6-inch (152 mm) gun followed, until their angle was masked by the ship's superstructure. The submarine, however, apparently frustrated, submerged. It may have remained in the area to try again, as on the following day, 15 August, a submarine periscope appeared some 200 yards away from the troopship, prompting three salvoes which drove the would-be attacker off.

In company with seven other transports—including Wilhelmina—on 23 August, in a convoy escorted by the armored cruiser USS Huntington and the destroyers USS Fairfax and Hull, Pastores spotted what she took to be a submarine periscope at about 09:50. Hull rang up full speed and reversed course; Huntington and Fairfax soon did likewise but found nothing.

Later that day, however, the enemy apparently reappeared. Pastores's commander sighted a periscope at 19:04; Hull sighted the same object five minutes later. The periscope appeared to be about 500 yards (457 meters) distant, three points (34 degrees) off Wilhelmina's starboard bow, and running on a course to starboard of and nearly opposite to that of the convoy. Pastores went to battle stations and headed for the periscope. Wilhelmina, too, turned toward the enemy.

With the 'scope in sight for about 10 seconds, the time allotted the gun crews of the American ships that spotted the enemy was short. Pastores got off one round of 4-inch (102-mm) at the swirling water where the object had disappeared. Frustrated by the submarine's going deep, Wilhelmina, unable to ram, turned aside to port. Hull, rushing to the scene, soon dropped three depth charges.

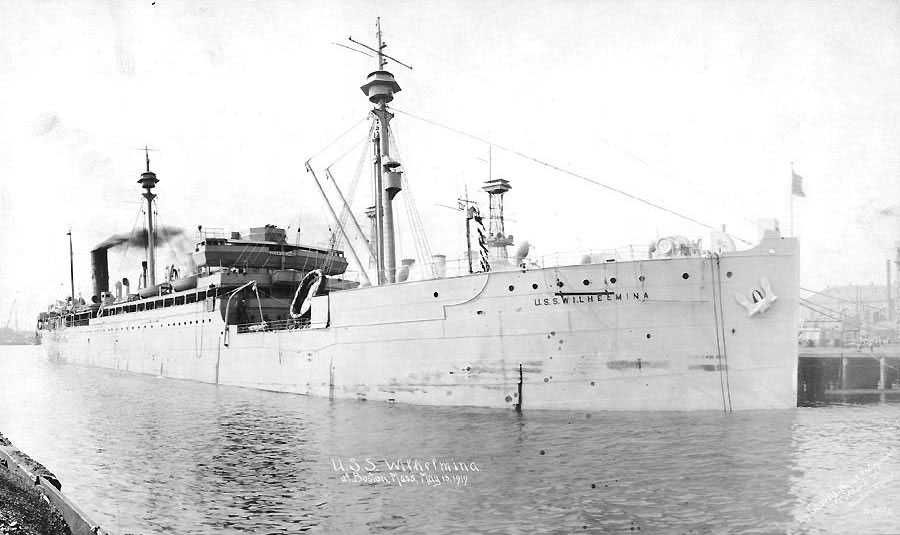
USS Wilhelmina (ID-2168) in the Boston Navy Yard on 13 May 1919. Note the two cage masts of a battleship behind her.

Three days later, on 26 August, Wilhelmina noticed a suspicious wake five degrees off her port bow, 2,500 yards (2,300 m) away and passing from port to starboard. Going to general quarters, Wilhelmina fired a shot from one of her forward guns shortly before she loosed three shots in succession from the forward starboard 6-inch (152-mm) battery. Nine rounds came from the after battery on that side; and, as the ship swung, the superstructure masked the forward guns. The wake soon disappeared; both Pastores and the Italian transport Dante Alighieri also fired several rounds at what was possibly a submersible, with no apparent success.

Wilhelmina emerged from World War I unscathed, although near-missed by a torpedo on 1 September 1918. After the armistice, she continued her troop-carrying activities, bringing back part of the AEF from France. She conducted seven postwar, round-trip voyages, returning 11,577 men home to the United States including 2,610 sick and wounded.

These postwar voyages were not made entirely without incident either. A fire broke out in a storeroom where blankets and pillows were kept, a little over six hours after the ship departed Bassens, France, standing down the Gironde River on 25 March 1919. The fire, reported at 21:52, was put out by 22:10 with only slight damage to the ship.

Wilhelmina subsequently entered the Ambrose Channel on 4 April 1919 and docked at Pier 1, Hoboken, New Jersey, the following day. There, she disembarked the troops and patients carried back from France. She began her last voyage shortly afterwards, returning to New York on 6 August 1919. There, she was decommissioned, struck from the Navy list, and returned to her owners on 16 August 1919.

== Later career ==
Wilhelmina remained under the Matson house flag through the 1920s and 1930s. In 1927, Wilhelmina was one of two ships that steered to aid the Travel Air 5000 City of Oakland in its successful transpacific flight attempt.

Sold to British interests in 1940, Wilhelmina was in Convoy HX 90, steaming from Halifax, Nova Scotia, Canada, to Liverpool, England, in the North Atlantic, on 2 December 1940 when the German submarine U-94, part of a wolfpack that included U-47 of Scapa Flow fame, drew a bead on a tanker and the steamer W. Hendrik, and fired two torpedoes. Both missed but continued on to strike and sink Wilhelmina.
