= German submarine U-94 (1940) =

German World War II submarine

Coordinates: 17°40′N 74°30′W

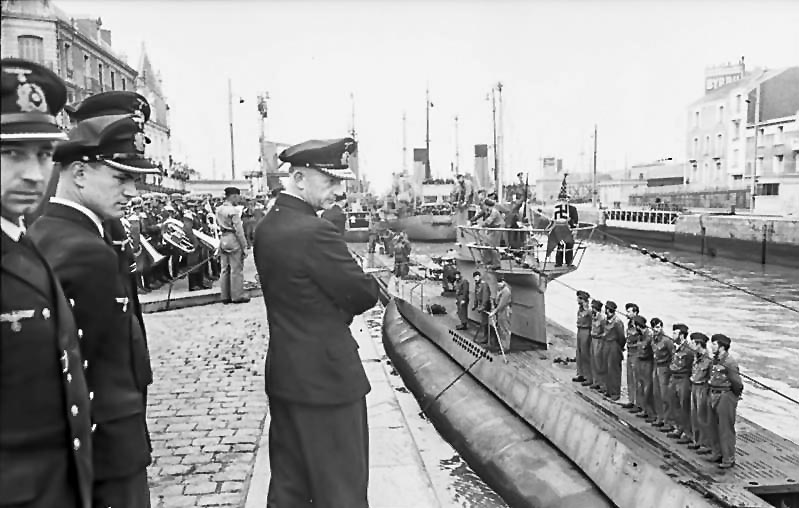
- Chief of the German U-boat arm Karl Dönitz observing the arrival of U-94 at Saint-Nazaire in June 1941

History

Nazi Germany
- Name: U-94
- Ordered: 30 May 1938
- Builder: Germaniawerft, Kiel
- Yard number: 599
- Laid down: 9 September 1939
- Launched: 12 June 1940
- Commissioned: 10 August 1940
- Fate: Sunk, 28 August 1942

General characteristics
- Class & type: Type VIIC submarine
- Displacement: 769 tonnes (757 long tons) surfaced; 871 t (857 long tons) submerged
- Length: 67.10 m (220 ft 2 in) o/a; 50.50 m (165 ft 8 in) pressure hull
- Beam: 6.20 m (20 ft 4 in) o/a; 4.70 m (15 ft 5 in) pressure hull
- Height: 9.60 m (31 ft 6 in)
- Draught: 4.74 m (15 ft 7 in)
- Installed power: 2,800–3,200 PS (2,100–2,400 kW; 2,800–3,200 bhp) (diesels); 750 PS (550 kW; 740 shp) (electric)
- Propulsion: 2 shafts; 2 × diesel engines; 2 × electric motors
- Speed: 17.7 knots (32.8 km/h; 20.4 mph) surfaced; 7.6 knots (14.1 km/h; 8.7 mph) submerged
- Range: 8,500 nmi (15,700 km; 9,800 mi) at 10 knots (19 km/h; 12 mph) surfaced; 80 nmi (150 km; 92 mi) at 4 knots (7.4 km/h; 4.6 mph) submerged
- Test depth: 230 m (750 ft); Crush depth: 250–295 m (820–968 ft)
- Complement: 4 officers, 40–56 enlisted
- Armament: 5 × 53.3 cm (21 in) torpedo tubes (four bow, one stern); 14 × torpedoes or 26 TMA mines; 1 × 8.8 cm (3.46 in) deck gun (220 rounds); 1 x 2 cm (0.79 in) C/30 AA gun

Service record
- Part of: 7th U-boat Flotilla; 10 August 1940 – 28 August 1942
- Identification codes: M 07 970
- Commanders: Kptlt. Herbert Kuppisch; 10 August 1940 – 29 August 1941; Oblt.z.S. Otto Ites; 29 August 1941 – 28 August 1942
- Operations: 10 patrols: 1st patrol: 20 November – 31 December 1940; 2nd patrol: 9 January – 19 February 1941; 3rd patrol: 29 March – 18 April 1941; 4th patrol: 29 April – 4 June 1941; 5th patrol: 12 July – 16 August 1941; 6th patrol: 2 September – 15 October 1941; 7th patrol: 12 – 30 January 1942; 8th patrol: 12 February – 2 April 1942; 9th patrol: 4 May – 23 June 1942; 10th patrol: 3 – 28 August 1942
- Victories: 26 merchant ships sunk (141,852 GRT); 1 merchant ship damaged (8,022 GRT)

German submarine U-94 was a Type VIIC U-boat of Nazi Germany's Kriegsmarine during World War II. She was laid down on 9 September 1939 at the F. Krupp Germaniawerft in Kiel as yard number 599, launched on 12 June 1940 and commissioned on 10 August 1940 under Kapitänleutnant Herbert Kuppisch.

She sank 26 ships of 141,852 GRT in ten patrols and was a member of six wolfpacks but was herself sunk by a US aircraft and a Canadian warship on 28 August 1942.

== Design ==
German Type VIIC submarines were preceded by the shorter Type VIIB submarines. U-94 had a displacement of 769 tonnes (757 long tons) when at the surface and 871 tonnes (857 long tons) while submerged. She had a total length of 67.10 m (220 ft 2 in), a pressure hull length of 50.50 m (165 ft 8 in), a beam of 6.20 m (20 ft 4 in), a height of 9.60 m (31 ft 6 in), and a draught of 4.74 m (15 ft 7 in). The submarine was powered by two Germaniawerft F46 four-stroke, six-cylinder supercharged diesel engines producing a total of 2,800 to 3,200 metric horsepower (2,060 to 2,350 kW; 2,760 to 3,160 shp) for use while surfaced, two AEG GU 460/8–27 double-acting electric motors producing a total of 750 metric horsepower (550 kW; 740 shp) for use while submerged. She had two shafts and two 1.23 m (4 ft) propellers. The boat was capable of operating at depths of up to 230 metres (750 ft).

The submarine had a maximum surface speed of 17.7 knots (32.8 km/h; 20.4 mph) and a maximum submerged speed of 7.6 knots (14.1 km/h; 8.7 mph). When submerged, the boat could operate for 80 nautical miles (150 km; 92 mi) at 4 knots (7.4 km/h; 4.6 mph); when surfaced, she could travel 8,500 nautical miles (15,700 km; 9,800 mi) at 10 knots (19 km/h; 12 mph). U-94 was fitted with five 53.3 cm (21 in) torpedo tubes (four fitted at the bow and one at the stern), fourteen torpedoes, one 8.8 cm (3.46 in) SK C/35 naval gun, 220 rounds, and a 2 cm (0.79 in) C/30 anti-aircraft gun. The boat had a complement of between forty-four and sixty.

== Service history ==
=== First patrol ===
The boat left Kiel on 20 November 1940, heading for Lorient in France which she reached, via the North Sea on 31 December.

On the way, she sank Stirlingshire on 2 December, 280 nautical miles (520 km; 320 mi) northwest of the Bloody Foreland, (a northwesterly point of the Irish mainland).

She also sent Wilhelmina and Empire Statesman to the bottom on the second and the 11th respectively.

After that, the boat headed for mid-ocean before docking at her French Atlantic base.

=== Second and third patrols ===
U-94 returned to the Atlantic west of Ireland and Scotland for her second patrol. She sank three more ships: Florian on 20 January 1941, West Wales on the 29th and Rushpool on the 30th.

For her third sortie, the boat moved into the waters west of Iceland. She sank Harbledown on 4 April 1941 and Lincoln Ellsworth on the sixth. The latter ship was destroyed by a combination of torpedo and fire from the deck gun.

=== Fourth and fifth patrols ===
U-94 was attacked by the escorts of convoy OB 318 on 7 May 1941. Some 98 depth charges over four hours were dropped. The boat persisted with her attack, however, sinking Eastern Star and Ixion.

Two more merchantmen met their end on the 20th: Norman Monarch and John P. Pedersen.

Patrol number five was carried out west of the Canary Islands; it was relatively uneventful.

=== Sixth patrol ===
Having left St. Nazaire on 2 September 1941, U-94 operated southeast of Cape Farewell (Greenland). She sank Newbury, Pegasus and Empire Eland, all on the 15th. On 1 October, she fired five torpedoes at San Florentino. Three of them struck home; the ship broke in two after the third impact. The bow section remained afloat and was engaged by the U-boat's deck gun, it was eventually finished off by HMCS Alberni.

The boat returned to Kiel on 15 October.

=== Seventh patrol ===
U-94 departed Kiel on 12 January 1942; she negotiated the gap between the Faroe and Shetland Islands, docking once more at St. Nazaire on the 30th.

=== Eighth patrol ===
The U-boat continued her successes on the western side of the Atlantic. She sank the Empire Hail east of St. Johns, Newfoundland on 24 February 1942. Following the coast-line to the south, her next victim was Cayrú, about 130 nautical miles (240 km; 150 mi) from New York on 9 March. She also sank Hvoslef two miles east of Fenwick Island, off Delaware Bay on the 11th.

=== Ninth patrol ===
U-94 left St. Nazaire on 4 May 1942 for what would be her top-scoring patrol, (it was to be carried out once more south of Greenland). Moving into this area, a steady stream of sinkings resulted; the Cocle on 12 May, Batna and Tolken, both on the 13th - a sailing ship, Maria da Glória on 5 June; Ramsay and Empire Clough on the tenth. Her last kill was Pontypridd, on the following day.

=== Tenth patrol and loss ===
The boat left St. Nazaire for the last time for the Caribbean on 3 August 1942. On 28 August, U-94 was in operation against convoy TAW 15 off Haiti when attacked by American and Canadian escorts. First, an American PBY swooped down and bombed the U-boat, and then Canadian corvettes HMCS Halifax and Snowberry attacked. HMCS Oakville fired depth charges which forced the submarine to the surface. The corvette then rammed U-94 twice before it slowed to a stop. Hal Lawrence led a boarding party of eleven sailors from Oakville to capture the boat. They boarded the vessel and entered through the conning tower. Only two Canadians actually went through the hatch, they were surprised by two Germans who came running towards them. After ordering halt, the Canadians fired and killed the attacking Germans when they failed to stop. The rest of the crew surrendered without incident. After just barely capturing the vessel, the Canadian sailors realized the Germans had already scuttled the boat and it was taking on water. The Canadians left U-94 and she sank with nineteen of her crew; Oakville rescued 26, including the commander, Oberleutnant zur See Otto Ites.

=== Wolfpacks ===
U-94 took part in six wolfpacks, namely:

- West (8 – 29 May 1941)
- Süd (22 July – 5 August 1941)
- Seewolf (5 – 15 September 1941)
- Brandenburg (15 – 29 September 1941)
- Robbe (17 – 24 January 1942)
- Hecht (8 May – 16 June 1942)

== Summary of raiding history ==
Date	Ship	Nationality	Tonnage	Fate
2 December 1940	Stirlingshire	United Kingdom	6,022	Sunk
2 December 1940	Wilhelmina	United Kingdom	6,725	Sunk
11 December 1940	Empire Statesman	United Kingdom	5,306	Sunk
20 January 1941	Florian	United Kingdom	3,174	Sunk
29 January 1941	West Wales	United Kingdom	4,353	Sunk
30 January 1941	Rushpool	United Kingdom	5,125	Sunk
4 April 1941	Harbledown	United Kingdom	5,414	Sunk
6 April 1941	Lincoln Ellsworth	Norway	5,580	Sunk
7 May 1941	Ixon	United Kingdom	10,263	Sunk
7 May 1941	Eastern Star	Norway	5,658	Sunk
20 May 1941	John P. Pedersen	Norway	6,128	Sunk
20 May 1941	Norman Monarch	United Kingdom	4,718	Sunk
15 September 1941	Newbury	United Kingdom	5,102	Sunk
15 September 1941	Pegasus	Greece	5,762	Sunk
15 September 1941	Empire Eland	United Kingdom	5,613	Sunk
1 October 1941	San Florentino	United Kingdom	12,842	Sunk
24 February 1942	Empire Hail	United Kingdom	7,005	Sunk
9 March 1942	Cayrǘ	Brazil	5,152	Sunk
11 March 1942	Hvoslef	Norway	1,630	Sunk
25 March 1942	Imperial Transport	United Kingdom	8,022	Damaged
12 May 1942	Cocle	Panama	5,630	Sunk
13 May 1942	Tolken	Sweden	4,471	Sunk
13 May 1942	Batna	United Kingdom	4,399	Sunk
5 June 1942	Maria da Glória	Portugal	320	Sunk
10 June 1942	Ramsay	United Kingdom	4,855	Sunk
10 June 1942	Empire Clough	United Kingdom	6,147	Sunk
11 June 1942	Pontypridd	United Kingdom	4,458	Sunk

== Bibliography ==
- Bishop, C (2006). Kriegsmarine U-Boats, 1939–45. Amber Books.
- Busch, Rainer; Röll, Hans-Joachim (1999). German U-boat commanders of World War II : a biographical dictionary. Translated by Brooks, Geoffrey. London, Annapolis, Md: Greenhill Books, Naval Institute Press. ISBN 1-55750-186-6.
- Busch, Rainer; Röll, Hans-Joachim (1999). Deutsche U-Boot-Verluste von September 1939 bis Mai 1945 [German U-boat losses from September 1939 to May 1945]. Der U-Boot-Krieg (in German). Vol. IV. Hamburg, Berlin, Bonn: Mittler. ISBN 3-8132-0514-2.
- Edwards, Bernard (1996). Dönitz and the Wolf Packs - The U-boats at War. Cassell Military Classics. pp. 66, 67, 70, 71. ISBN 0-304-35203-9.
- Gröner, Erich; Jung, Dieter; Maass, Martin (1991). German Warships 1815–1945, U-boats and Mine Warfare Vessels. Vol. 2. Translated by Thomas, Keith; Magowan, Rachel. London: Conway Maritime Press. ISBN 0-85177-593-4.
- Miller, David (2000). U-Boats: the Illustrated History of the Raiders of the Deep. Washington: Brassey’s Inc.
- Jones, Moira (1995). The Times Atlas of the World (Third, revised ed.). ISBN 0-7230-0809-4.
