= HMCS Saguenay (D79) =

Canadian River-class destroyer

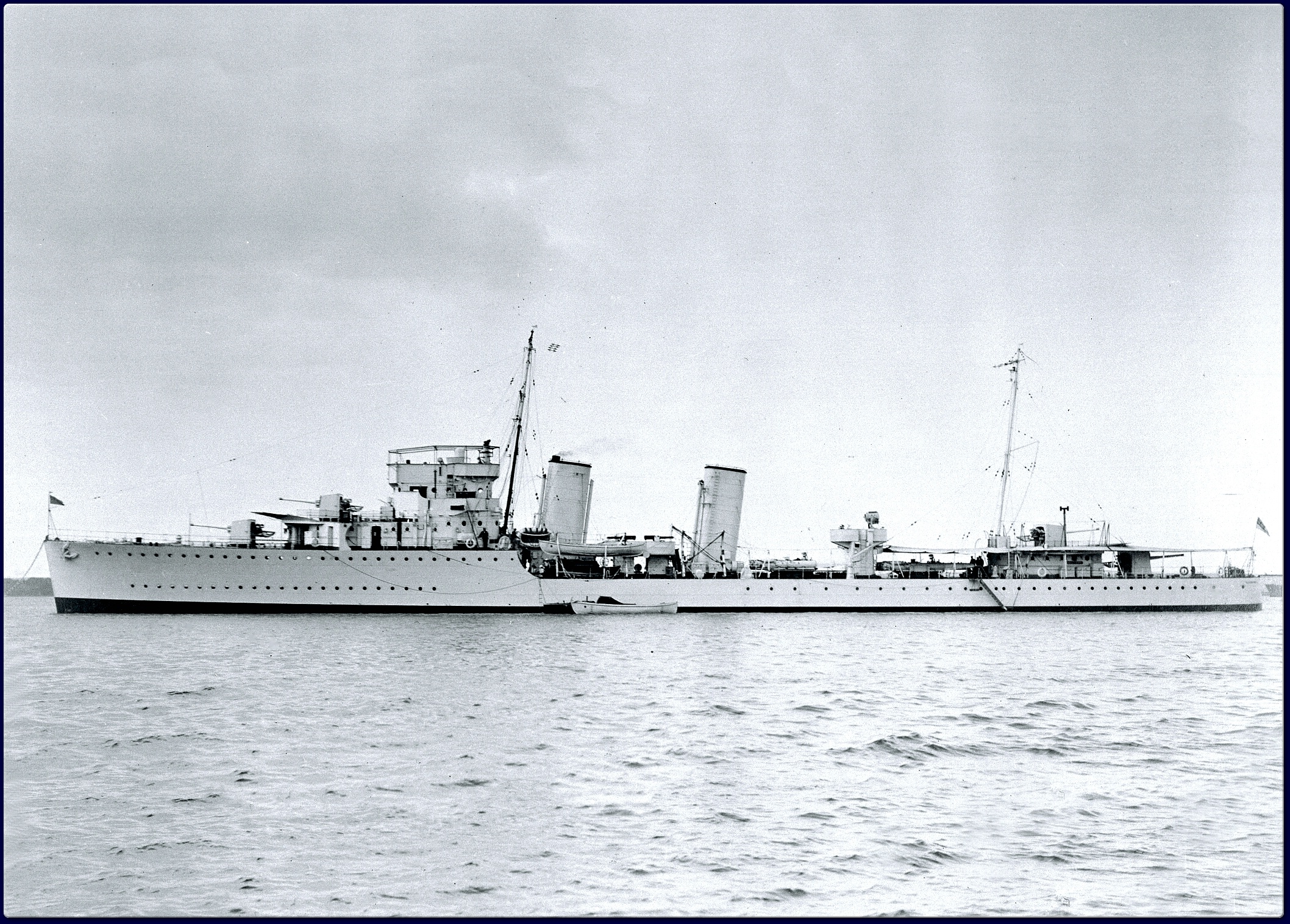
- HMCS Saguenay

History

Canada
- Name: Saguenay
- Namesake: Saguenay River
- Builder: John I. Thornycroft & Company at Woolston, Hampshire
- Yard number: 1091
- Launched: 11 July 1930
- Commissioned: 21 May 1931
- Decommissioned: July 1945
- Identification: Pennant number D79
- Honours and awards: Atlantic, 1939–1942

General characteristics
- Class & type: A-class/River-class destroyer
- Displacement: 1,337 long tons (1,358 t)
- Length: 321 ft 3 in (97.92 m) o/a; 309 ft (94 m) p/p
- Beam: 32 ft 9 in (9.98 m)
- Draught: 10 ft (3.0 m)
- Installed power: 32,000 shp (23,862 kW)
- Speed: 31 knots (57 km/h; 36 mph)
- Complement: 181
- Armament: Original; 4 × QF 4.7 inch (120 mm) guns; 8 × tubes for 21 inch (533 mm) torpedoes (2×4); 2 × QF 2-pounder (40 mm) guns; Wartime modifications; 3 × QF 4.7 inch (120 mm) guns; 1 × QF 12-pounder (3 inch (76 mm)) gun; 4 × tubes for 21 inch torpedoes (1×4); 4 × QF 20 mm Oerlikon guns

HMCS Saguenay was a River-class destroyer that served in the Royal Canadian Navy (RCN) from 1931 to 1945.

She was similar to the Royal Navy's A class and initially wore the pennant D79, changed in 1940 to I79.

== History ==
She was built by John I. Thornycroft & Company at Woolston, Hampshire and commissioned into the RCN on 21 May 1931 at Portsmouth, England. Saguenay and her sister Skeena were the first ships specifically built for the RCN. Her first two commanding officers went on to become two of the most important Admirals of the Battle of the Atlantic. She arrived in Halifax, on 3 July 1931.

=== Second World War ===
For the first month of Second World War, Saguenay was assigned to convoy duties in the Halifax area. In late September 1939, she was assigned to the American and West Indies Squadron based at Kingston, Jamaica.

On 23 October 1939, the German-flagged tanker Emmy Friederich scuttled herself on encountering Saguenay in the Yucatán Channel, and thus became the Canadian destroyer's first war conquest. In December 1939, Saguenay returned to Halifax to join the local convoy escort force, with which she remained until 16 October 1940, when she was transferred to Greenock, Scotland to serve as a convoy escort on the North Atlantic run. On 1 December 1940, Saguenay was torpedoed 300 miles (480 km) west of Ireland by the Italian submarine Argo while escorting Convoy HG 47, and managed to return to Barrow-in-Furness, escorted by HMS Highlander, largely under her own power, but with 21 dead and without most of her bow; she was under repair in Greenock until 22 May 1941.

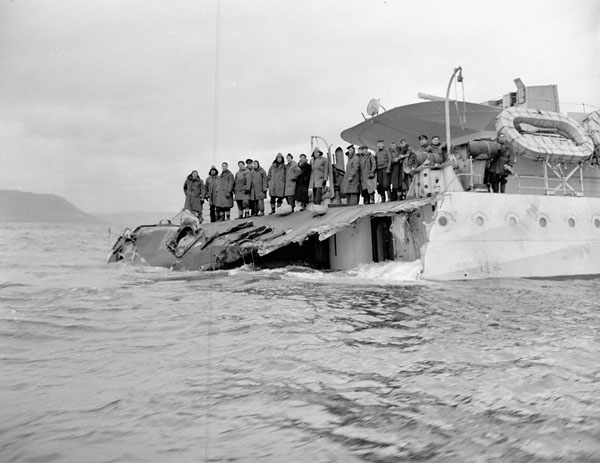
Damaged stern of the destroyer Saguenay. Saguenay was rammed by SS Azra south of Cape Race, and lost her stern when her depth charges exploded. St. John's, Newfoundland

After repairs at Greenock, she returned to sea on 22 May 1941. Saguenay was assigned to Escort Group C-3 escorting convoys ON 93, HX 191, ONS 104, SC 90, ON 115, HX 202, ON 121, SC 98, ON 131, HX 210 and ON 141 prior to a collision while escorting SC 109. On 15 November 1942, Saguenay was rammed by the Panamanian freighter Azra off Cape Race, Newfoundland. The impact of the collision set off Saguenay's depth charges, which blew off her stern.

She made port at Saint John, New Brunswick, where her stern was plated over. On 23 May 1943, Saguenay was transferred to Halifax, to serve with the Western Ocean Escort Force working from Halifax and St. John's, Newfoundland. In October 1943 Saguenay was towed to Digby, Nova Scotia, as a tender assigned to HMCS Cornwallis, the Royal Canadian Navy's training depot for new entries (recruits). She was used for teaching seamanship and gunnery until 30 July 1945, paid off in late 1945, and broken up in 1946.

== Convoys escorted ==
=== Trans-Atlantic convoys escorted ===
Convoy	Escort Group	Dates	Notes
HX 132		14–23 June 1941	Newfoundland to Iceland
HX 137		9–17 July 1941	Newfoundland to Iceland
SC 60		18-27 Dec 1941	Newfoundland to Iceland
ON 52		5-11 Jan 1942	Iceland to Newfoundland
SC 79	MOEF group C3	19–27 April 1942	Newfoundland to Northern Ireland
ON 93	MOEF group C3	9–15 May 1942	Northern Ireland to Newfoundland
HX 191	MOEF group C3	28 May-5 June 1942	Newfoundland to Northern Ireland
ON 104	MOEF group C3	18–27 June 1942	Northern Ireland to Newfoundland
SC 90	MOEF group C3	6–16 July 1942	Newfoundland to Northern Ireland
ON 115	MOEF group C3	25–31 July 1942	Northern Ireland to Newfoundland
HX 202	MOEF group C3	12-17 Aug 1942	Newfoundland to Iceland
ON 121	MOEF group C3	17-20 Aug 1942	Iceland to Newfoundland
SC 98	MOEF group C3	2-12 Sept 1942	Newfoundland to Northern Ireland
ON 131	MOEF group C3	19-28 Sept 1942	Northern Ireland to Newfoundland
HX 210	MOEF group C3	7-15 Oct 1942	Newfoundland to Northern Ireland
ON 141	MOEF group C3	26 Oct-2 Nov 1942	Northern Ireland to Newfoundland
