= German submarine U-140 (1940) =

German World War II submarine

History

Nazi Germany
- Name: U-140
- Ordered: 25 September 1939
- Builder: Deutsche Werke, Kiel
- Yard number: 269
- Laid down: 16 November 1939
- Launched: 28 June 1940
- Commissioned: 7 August 1940
- Fate: Scuttled on 5 May 1945 at Wilhelmshaven

General characteristics
- Class & type: Type IID coastal submarine
- Displacement: 314 t (309 long tons) surfaced; 364 t (358 long tons) submerged
- Length: 43.97 m (144 ft 3 in) o/a; 29.80 m (97 ft 9 in) pressure hull
- Beam: 4.92 m (16 ft 2 in) (o/a); 4.00 m (13 ft 1 in) (pressure hull)
- Height: 8.40 m (27 ft 7 in)
- Draught: 3.93 m (12 ft 11 in)
- Installed power: 700 PS (510 kW; 690 bhp) (diesels); 410 PS (300 kW; 400 shp) (electric)
- Propulsion: 2 shafts; 2 × diesel engines; 2 × electric motors
- Speed: 12.7 knots (23.5 km/h; 14.6 mph) surfaced; 7.4 knots (13.7 km/h; 8.5 mph) submerged
- Range: 3,450 nmi (6,390 km; 3,970 mi) at 12 knots (22 km/h; 14 mph) surfaced; 56 nmi (104 km; 64 mi) at 4 knots (7.4 km/h; 4.6 mph) submerged
- Test depth: 80 m (260 ft)
- Complement: 3 officers, 22 men
- Armament: 3 × 53.3 cm (21 in) torpedo tubes; 5 × torpedoes or up to 12 TMA or 18 TMB mines; 1 × 2 cm (0.79 in) C/30 anti-aircraft gun

Service record
- Part of: 1st U-boat Flotilla; 7 August - 31 December 1940; 22nd U-boat Flotilla; 1 January 1941 - 31 March 1945; 31st U-boat Flotilla; 1 April - 5 May 1945
- Identification codes: M 05 988
- Commanders: Oblt.z.S. Hans-Peter Hinsch; 7 August 1940 - 6 April 1941; Oblt.z.S. Hans-Jürgen Hellriegel; 7 April - 9 December 1941; Oblt.z.S. / Kptlt. Klaus Popp; 10 December 1941 - 1 September 1942; Lt.z.S. / Oblt.z.S. Albrecht Markert; 2 September 1942 - 31 July 1944; Oblt.z.S. Herbert Zeissier; 1 August - 19 November 1944; Oblt.z.S. Wolfgang Scherfling; 20 November 1944 - 5 May 1945
- Operations: 3 patrols: 1st patrol: a. 20 November - 17 December 1940; b. 19–20 December 1940; 2nd patrol: 19 - 30 June 1941; 3rd patrol: 7 - 24 July 1941
- Victories: 3 merchant ships sunk (12,410 GRT); 1 warship sunk (206 tons)

German submarine U-140 was a Type IID U-boat of Nazi Germany's Kriegsmarine during World War II. She carried out three combat patrol. Built at the Kiel shipyards during 1939 and 1940, as a Type IID U-boat, she was too small for major operational work in the Atlantic Ocean, which was now required by the Kriegsmarine as the Battle of the Atlantic expanded.

== Design ==
German Type IID submarines were enlarged versions of the original Type IIs. U-140 had a displacement of 314 tonnes (309 long tons) when at the surface and 364 tonnes (358 long tons) while submerged. Officially, the standard tonnage was 250 long tons (254 t), however. The U-boat had a total length of 43.97 m (144 ft 3 in), a pressure hull length of 29.80 m (97 ft 9 in), a beam of 4.92 m (16 ft 2 in), a height of 8.40 m (27 ft 7 in), and a draught of 3.93 m (12 ft 11 in). The submarine was powered by two MWM RS 127 S four-stroke, six-cylinder diesel engines of 700 metric horsepower (510 kW; 690 shp) for cruising, two Siemens-Schuckert PG VV 322/36 double-acting electric motors producing a total of 410 metric horsepower (300 kW; 400 shp) for use while submerged. She had two shafts and two 0.85 m (3 ft) propellers. The boat was capable of operating at depths of up to 80–150 metres (260–490 ft).

The submarine had a maximum surface speed of 12.7 knots (23.5 km/h; 14.6 mph) and a maximum submerged speed of 7.4 knots (13.7 km/h; 8.5 mph). When submerged, the boat could operate for 35–42 nautical miles (65–78 km; 40–48 mi) at 4 knots (7.4 km/h; 4.6 mph); when surfaced, she could travel 3,800 nautical miles (7,000 km; 4,400 mi) at 8 knots (15 km/h; 9.2 mph). U-140 was fitted with three 53.3 cm (21 in) torpedo tubes at the bow, five torpedoes or up to twelve Type A torpedo mines, and a 2 cm (0.79 in) anti-aircraft gun. The boat had a complement of 25.

== War patrol ==
U-140 carried out three raiding patrols, first under her first captain, Hans-Peter Hinsch. He took her round the north of Scotland in December 1940 following her work-up program, and it was here that she sank her first victim, twelve days into the voyage. Six days later north of Ireland, on 8 December she sank the steel 3-mast barque Penang of neutral Finland, inbound from Stenhouse Bay, South Australia to Cobh in neutral Ireland with a cargo of grain. The Penang and her 18 crew were all lost at 55.25°N 10.15°W. Later that day she heard the British freighter Ashcrest broadcast that she needed assistance as her rudder was broken, at 54°35′N 09°20′W. U-140 sank Ashcrest with the loss of the entire crew of 37.

She then headed home towards retirement. U-140 was docked, her crew transferred and she was converted into a training boat, designed to operate solely in the Baltic Sea, training submariners for the main U-boat force.

== Training boat ==
It was during this onerous yet necessary duty that her new captain, Hans-Jürgen Hellriegel, found himself facing a small Soviet submarine on the surface, well into the Baltic, a month after the invasion of the Soviet Union. In a careful attack, U-140 torpedoed and sank her rival with his scratch crew of new recruits. Orders had been pushing U-140 further into the Baltic during the preceding months, with the hope that she might achieve just such a victory.

Following this excitement, U-140 returned to training duties, which she continued for the remainder of the war without further incident, save in the final months, when she was transferred to Wilhelmshaven in a general shipment of equipment and personnel to the West. It was there, on the 5 May 1945 in Jade Bay, that U-140 was scuttled by her crew to prevent her seizure by the advancing British forces. Post-war she was raised and scrapped.

== Summary of raiding history ==
Date	Ship	Nationality	Tonnage (Note: Merchant ship tonnages are in gross register tons. Military vessels are listed by tons displacement.)	Fate
2 December 1940	Victoria City	United Kingdom	4,739	Sunk
8 December 1940	Penang	Finland	2,019	Sunk
8 December 1940	Ashcrest	United Kingdom	5,652	Sunk
21 July 1941	M-94	Soviet Navy	206	Sunk

== Bibliography ==
- Busch, Rainer; Röll, Hans-Joachim (1999). German U-boat commanders of World War II : a biographical dictionary. Translated by Brooks, Geoffrey. London, Annapolis, Md: Greenhill Books, Naval Institute Press. ISBN 1-55750-186-6.
- Busch, Rainer; Röll, Hans-Joachim (1999). Deutsche U-Boot-Verluste von September 1939 bis Mai 1945 [German U-boat losses from September 1939 to May 1945]. Der U-Boot-Krieg (in German). Vol. IV. Hamburg, Berlin, Bonn: Mittler. ISBN 3-8132-0514-2.
- Gröner, Erich; Jung, Dieter; Maass, Martin (1991). U-boats and Mine Warfare Vessels. German Warships 1815–1945. Vol. 2. Translated by Thomas, Keith; Magowan, Rachel. London: Conway Maritime Press. ISBN 0-85177-593-4.
- Sharpe, Peter (1998). U-Boat Fact File. Midland Publishing. ISBN 1-85780-072-9.
