= List of shipwrecks in February 1941 =

The list of shipwrecks in February 1941 includes all ships sunk, foundered, grounded, or otherwise lost during February 1941.

== 1 February ==
List of shipwrecks: 1 February 1941
Ship	State	Description
Kai	United Kingdom	The 1,251 GRT cargo ship on a trip from Swansea for Southampton with a cargo of coal, struck a submerged object and sank in the Bristol Channel off Trevose Head, Cornwall.
Königsberg-Preussen	Germany	World War II: The 2,530 GRT cargo ship on a trip from Nordenham for Göteborg struck a mine and sank in the North Sea off Cuxhaven (54°1′N 8°10′E).
Nicolas Angelos	Greece	World War II: The 4,351 GRT cargo ship on a passage from Liverpool for New York in ballast, was torpedoed, shelled and sunk in the Atlantic Ocean (approximately 59°N 17°W) by U-48 (Kriegsmarine). Her crew took to the lifeboats, but were not seen again.
Rockpool	United Kingdom	World War II: Convoy SC 19: The cargo ship ran aground on Little Cumbrae and was declared a constructive total loss. She was repaired and re-entered service in 1941 as Empire Trent.

== 2 February ==
List of shipwrecks: 2 February 1941
Ship	State	Description
HMT Almond	Royal Navy	World War II: The Tree-class trawler (505 GRT) struck a mine and sank in the English Channel off Falmouth, Cornwall with the loss of 19 of her crew.
Pallieter	Belgium	The 168 GRT coaster on a trip from Dublin for Ardrossan with a cargo of scrap iron, foundered in the Firth of Clyde (55°15′N 5°18′W) after her cargo shifted during a storm.
The Sultan	United Kingdom	World War II: The 824 GRT coaster on a voyage from Glasgow for London with a cargo of spelter, was bombed and sunk in the North Sea (51°43′N 1°26′E) by Luftwaffe aircraft with the loss of two of her fourteen crew. Survivors were rescued by the fishing trawler Lord St Vincent (United Kingdom).

== 3 February ==
List of shipwrecks: 3 February 1941
Ship	State	Description
HMT Arctic Trapper	Royal Navy	World War II: The naval trawler was bombed and sunk in the North Sea east of Ramsgate, Kent by Luftwaffe aircraft with the loss of seventeen of her crew.
HMS Crispin	Royal Navy	World War II: The ocean boarding vessel was torpedoed and damaged in the Atlantic Ocean 500 nautical miles (930 km) west of Ireland (56°38′N 20°05′W) by U-107 (Kriegsmarine), with the loss of twenty of her 141 crew. Survivors were rescued by Copeland (United Kingdom) and HMS Harvester (Royal Navy). HMS Crispin sank the next day (56°52′N 20°22′W).
Dione II	United Kingdom	World War II: Convoy SC 20. The cargo ship was bombed and damaged in the Atlantic Ocean (55°40′N 14°23′W) by Focke-Wulf Fw 200 aircraft of I Staffeln, Kampfgeschwader 40, Luftwaffe. She straggled behind the convoy and was torpedoed and sunk the next day (55°50′N 10°30′W) by U-93 (Kriegsmarine) with the loss of 28 of her 33 crew. Survivors were rescued by Flowergate (United Kingdom).
Empire Citizen	United Kingdom	World War II: Convoy OB 279: The refrigerated cargo liner was torpedoed and sunk in the Atlantic Ocean (58°12′N 23°22′W) by U-107 (Kriegsmarine), with the loss of 78 of the 83 people aboard. Survivors were rescued by HMS Clarkia (Royal Navy).
HMS MGB 12	Royal Navy	World War II: The BPB 70-foot-class motor gun boat was damaged by a mine off Milford Haven, Pembrokeshire. She sank on 6 February while under tow.
HMT Midas	Royal Navy	The naval trawler collided with another vessel and sank in the English Channel off Dungeness, Kent.
Multedo	Italy	The 1,130 GRT cargo ship travelling in a convoy from Benghasi for Tripoli with a cargo of fuel and ammunition, separated during the night and disappeared without a trace. Several bodies were washed ashore in March 1941 near El Agheila. Most likely the ship sank in the Gulf of Sirte in bad weather.
Reliance	United States	With no-one aboard, the fishing vessel was destroyed by fire at Ketchikan, Territory of Alaska.

== 4 February ==
List of shipwrecks: 4 February 1941
Ship	State	Description
Aghios Georgios	Greece	World War II: The cargo ship struck a mine and sank in the Suez Canal with the loss of three of her 27 crew. The wreck was subsequently removed.
Calafatis	Greece	World War II: Convoy SC 20: The cargo ship was bombed and sunk in the Atlantic Ocean (56°27′N 13°40′W) by Focke-Wulf Fw 200 aircraft of I Staffeln, Kampfgeschwader 40, Luftwaffe with the loss of eighteen of her 31 crew.
Duri	United States	The fishing vessel was wrecked on the coast of Biorka Island, near Sitka, Territory of Alaska. Both people aboard survived.
Empire Engineer	United Kingdom	World War II: Convoy SC 20: The cargo ship straggled behind the convoy. She was torpedoed and sunk in the Atlantic Ocean (approximately 54°21′N 23°15′W) by U-123 (Kriegsmarine) with the loss of all 39 crew. Empire Engineer was on a voyage from Sydney, Nova Scotia, Canada to Newport, Monmouthshire.
Forbach	Kriegsmarine	World War II: The 7,908 GRT tanker, former Dutch vessel Perna, was bombed and damaged at Le Havre, Seine-Inférieure, France by Royal Air Force aircraft.
Gwynwood	United Kingdom	World War II: The cargo ship was sunk in the North Sea off the mouth of the Humber by a parachute mine with the loss of eleven of her crew.
HMT Imbat	Royal Navy	The naval trawler collided with another vessel and sank in Scapa Flow, Orkney Islands.
John A. Essberger	Germany	World War II: The 739 GRT coastal tanker was bombed and sunk at Le Havre by Royal Air Force aircraft. Raised on 11 February, repaired and returned to service.
Marie	United States	The fishing vessel was wrecked near Kake, Territory of Alaska. The only person aboard survived.
Politician	United Kingdom	The 7,939 GRT cargo ship on a trip from Liverpool for New Orleans with general cargo, ran aground off Eriskay, Outer Hebrides and was wrecked.
Ringhorn	Norway	World War II: Convoy OB 280: The cargo ship was torpedoed and sunk in the Atlantic Ocean (55°46′N 22°36′W) by U-52 (Kriegsmarine) with the loss of fourteen of her nineteen crew. Survivors were rescued by HMS Harvester (Royal Navy).

== 5 February ==
List of shipwrecks: 5 February 1941
Ship	State	Description
B-372 Alessandro Pacchiani	Regia Marina	The 39 GRT auxiliary minesweeper was scuttled at Benghasi by her crew in anticipation of city evacuation.
Empire Breeze	United Kingdom	The cargo ship ran aground on Bondicar Rocks, off Amble, Northumberland. She was refloated on 13 March with assistance from the tug Bullger (United Kingdom). Empire Breeze was subsequently repaired and returned to service.
Ioannis M. Embiricos	Greece	World War II: Convoy SC 20: The cargo ship was bombed and damaged in the Atlantic Ocean (55°41′N 12°26′W) by Focke-Wulf Fw 200 aircraft of I Staffeln, Kampfgeschwader 40, Luftwaffe. She sank the next day. Her crew were rescued.
Minnie de Larrinaga	United Kingdom	World War II: The cargo ship was sunk as a blockship at Dover, Kent.
Nuovo Bartolomeo	Italy	The requisitioned 28 GRT motor fishing boat was scuttled at Benghasi by her crew in anticipation of city evacuation.
R-29 Pietro Padre	Regia Marina	The 40 GRT auxiliary minesweeper departed Benghasi in the morning in anticipation of city evacuation, but was wrecked later the same day in the Gulf of Sirte in bad weather.
Ranee	United Kingdom	World War II: The cargo ship struck a mine and broke in two in the Suez Canal with the loss of nine of her 79 crew. The bow section was taken into Port Said, Egypt; the stern section sank.
Ryfylke	Norway	World War II: The refrigerated cargo liner was torpedoed and sunk in the Norwegian Sea off Stadlandet by HMS Sealion (Royal Navy). All 45 people aboard were rescued by Christian Bugge (Norway).
G-11 SICAM 43	Regia Marina	The 95 GRT auxiliary minesweeper, a former tug, was scuttled at Benghasi by her crew in anticipation of city evacuation. Raised by the British, repaired and put into service as Port Levant.
Snia Amba	Italy	World War II: The 2,532 GRT cargo ship, damaged in November 1940 torpedo attack and in unusable state, was scuttled at Benghazi, Libya. She was later salvaged by the British.
HMT Tourmaline	Royal Navy	World War II: The Agate type naval trawler was bombed and sunk in the North Sea off North Foreland, Kent by Luftwaffe aircraft.

== 6 February ==
List of shipwrecks: 6 February 1941
Ship	State	Description
Angularity	United Kingdom	World War II: The coaster (501 GRT) was torpedoed and sunk in the North Sea by S 30 (Kriegsmarine) with the loss of six of her crew. One survivor was taken as a prisoner of war.
B-298 Antonio	Regia Marina	The 52 GRT auxiliary minesweeper, a former tug, was scuttled at Benghasi during the city's evacuation.
Hopper No.34	United Kingdom	World War II: The dredger (1,500 GRT) of Canal Company was sunk by a mines at km 138 in the Suez Canal.
Hopper No.39	Royal Navy	World War II: The dredger (1,500 GRT), converted for minesweeping, was heavily damaged by a mines at km 136 in the Suez Canal and was run aground. Two crew were killed.
Maplecourt	Canada	World War II: Convoy SC 20: The cargo ship (3,388 GRT) straggled behind the convoy. She was torpedoed and sunk in the Atlantic Ocean (55°39′N 15°56′W) by U-107 (Kriegsmarine) with all hands (35 crew and 3 gunners).
Rosanna	Italy	The 205 GRT tanker travelling from Benghasi for Tripoli, ran aground in stormy weather about 2 nautical miles (3.7 km) west of Zuetina, and was wrecked.

== 7 February ==
List of shipwrecks: 7 February 1941
Ship	State	Description
Bay Fisher	United Kingdom	World War II: The cargo ship (575 GRT) was bombed and sunk by Luftwaffe aircraft 3.5 nautical miles (6.5 km) north east of Bell Rock, Scotland with the loss of eight of her 12 crew.
Scottish Cooperation	United Kingdom	World War II: The cargo ship struck a mine and was damaged in the Solway Firth off Workington, Cumberland. She was beached but refloated later that day.

== 8 February ==
List of shipwrecks: 8 February 1941
Ship	State	Description
Ramon de Larrinaga	United Kingdom	The cargo ship sprang a leak in the Atlantic Ocean 75 nautical miles (139 km) off the coast of New Jersey, United States. She was beached the next day at Lewes, Delaware. She was refloated on 26 June but was declared a constructive total loss. Ramon de Larrinaga was repaired and returned to service in 1942 as Empire Mersey.
Thala	United Kingdom	The 4,399 GRT cargo ship on a trip from Pepel for Tees with general cargo, ran aground at Hartimeal Island, South Uist, Outer Hebrides and broke in two. She was declared a total loss.

== 9 February ==
List of shipwrecks: 9 February 1941
Ship	State	Description
Britannic	United Kingdom	World War II: Convoy HG 53: The cargo ship was bombed and sunk in the Atlantic Ocean (35°42′N 14°38′W) by Focke-Wulf Fw 200 Kondor aircraft of the Luftwaffe with the loss of a crew member.
Ciss	Norway	The cargo ship foundered in the Atlantic Ocean off Louisbourg, Nova Scotia, Canada. Her crew survived.
Courland	United Kingdom	World War II: Convoy HG 53: The cargo ship was torpedoed and sunk in the Atlantic Ocean (35°53′N 13°13′W) by U-37 (Kriegsmarine) with the loss of three of her 33 crew. Survivors were rescued by Brandenburg (United Kingdom).
Dagmar I	United Kingdom	World War II: Convoy HG 53: The cargo ship was bombed and sunk in the Atlantic Ocean (35°42′N 14°38′W) by Focke-Wulf Fw 200 Kondor aircraft of the Luftwaffe with the loss of five of her crew.
Estrellano	United Kingdom	World War II: Convoy HG 53: The cargo ship was torpedoed and sunk in the Atlantic Ocean (35°53′N 13°13′W) by U-37 (Kriegsmarine) with the loss of six of her 29 crew. Survivors were rescued by HMS Deptford (Royal Navy)
Ezilda Croce	Italy	World War II:Operation Grog: The 1,230 GRT cargo ship moored at Ponte Colombo, Genoa was sunk by naval bombardment. Later raised, repaired and returned to service.
R-114 IV Novembre	Regia Marina	World War II: The 61 GRT auxiliary minesweeper, a former tug, on a trip from Benghasi for Tripoli was damaged in stormy weather, ran aground and was scuttled by her crew near Buerat el Hsun.
Jura	United Kingdom	World War II: Convoy HG 53: The cargo ship was bombed and sunk in the Atlantic Ocean (35°42′N 14°38′W) by Focke-Wulf Fw 200 Kondor aircraft of the Luftwaffe with the loss of seventeen of her 25 crew.
Kervégan	United Kingdom	World War II: Convoy SC 22: The cargo ship foundered off "Cape Agulhas", Nova Scotia, Canada (43°40′N 61°33′W) with the loss of all 26 crew. She was on a voyage from Halifax, Nova Scotia to Loch Ewe.
V-46 Rosina	Regia Marina	World War II: The requisitioned 232 GRT motor schooner travelling from Benghasi for Tripoli, ran aground in stormy weather east of Zuetina, and was wrecked.
Tejo	Norway	World War II: Convoy HG 53: The cargo ship was bombed and sunk in the Atlantic Ocean (35°42′N 14°38′W) by Focke-Wulf Fw 200 Kondor aircraft of the Luftwaffe with the loss of four of her fifteen crew.
G-74 Tenax	Regia Marina	World War II: The 115 GRT auxiliary minesweeper, a former tug, on a trip from Benghasi for Tripoli, was damaged in stormy weather and had to call in at Marsa el Brega for repairs on 7 February. Due to severity of the damage, was scuttled by her crew on 9 February.
V-85 Teresuccia	Regia Marina	World War II: The requisitioned 313 GRT motor schooner, anchored at Marsa el Brega and unable to leave due to stormy weather, was scuttled by her crew.
Varna	United Kingdom	World War II: Convoy HG 53: The cargo ship was bombed and damaged in the Atlantic Ocean (35°42′N 14°38′W) by Focke-Wulf Fw 200 Kondor aircraft of the Luftwaffe. Her crew were rescued. Varna sank on 16 February at 44°55′N 22°30′W.

== 10 February ==
List of shipwrecks: 10 February 1941
Ship	State	Description
HMT Boy Alan	Royal Navy	The naval trawler collided with another vessel and sank in the Thames Estuary. There were no casualties.
Brandenburg	United Kingdom	World War II: Convoy HG 53: The cargo ship was torpedoed and sunk in the Atlantic Ocean north of Madeira, Portugal (36°10′N 15°38′W) by U-37 (Kriegsmarine) with the loss of 23 of her 24 crew, plus all 30 survivors from Courland (United Kingdom). The survivor was rescued by HMS Velox (Royal Navy).
Canford Chine	United Kingdom	World War II: Convoy OG 52: The cargo ship straggled behind the convoy. She was torpedoed and sunk in the Atlantic Ocean south south west of Rockall, Inverness-shire (55°51′N 17°35′W) by U-52 (Kriegsmarine) with the loss of her 36 crew.
Heina	Norway	World War II: Convoy SC 67: The cargo ship was torpedoed and sunk in the Atlantic Ocean (56°09′N 31°09′W) by U-136 (Kriegsmarine). Her 36 crew were rescued by HMCS Dauphin (Royal Canadian Navy).

== 11 February ==
List of shipwrecks: 11 February 1941
Ship	State	Description
Eamont	United Kingdom	World War II: The 117.5-foot (35.8 m), 227-ton fishing trawler was bombed and damaged in the North Sea (58°15′N 3°26′W) by Luftwaffe aircraft. Her ten crew were rescued. She came ashore the next day and broke up.
Iceland	United Kingdom	World War II: Convoy HG 53: The cargo ship was shelled and sunk in the Atlantic Ocean by Admiral Hipper (Kriegsmarine).
John Dunkin	United Kingdom	World War II: The fishing trawler was bombed and sunk in the North Sea 13 nautical miles (24 km) north by east of Buckie, Aberdeenshire by Luftwaffe aircraft with the loss of one crew member.
HMS Snapper	Royal Navy	World War II: The S-class submarine was depth charged and sunk in the Bay of Biscay south west of Ouessant, Finistère, France (47°25′N 5°47′W) by M-2, M-13 and M-25 (all Kriegsmarine) with the loss of all 41 crew.
HMSAS Southern Floe	South African Navy	World War II: The naval whaler (344 GRT) struck a mine and sank in the Mediterranean Sea off Tobruk, Libya with the loss of 27 of her crew. The only survivor was rescued by HMAS Voyager (Royal Australian Navy).

== 12 February ==
List of shipwrecks: 12 February 1941
Ship	State	Description
Borgestad	Norway	World War II: Convoy SLS 64: The cargo ship was shelled and sunk in the Atlantic Ocean north west of Madeira, Portugal (37°10′N 21°20′W) by Admiral Hipper (Kriegsmarine) with the loss of all 31 crew.
Caledonian	United Kingdom	World War II: The fishing boat struck a mine and sank.
Carso	Italy	World War II: The 6,275 GRT cargo ship was scuttled at Chisimaio, Italian Somaliland. She was later salvaged, repaired and entered British service as Empire Tana.
Derrynane	United Kingdom	World War II: Convoy SLS 64: The cargo ship was shelled and sunk in the Atlantic Ocean north west of Madeira (37°12′N 21°20′W) by Admiral Hipper (Kriegsmarine) with the loss of all hands.
Integritas	Italy	World War II: The 5,952 GRT cargo ship was scuttled at Chisimaio in anticipation of city's fall.
Gullmarn	Sweden	The hulked barque was wrecked off Madeira.
Marghera	Italy	World War II: The 4,531 GRT tanker was scuttled at Chisimaio in anticipation of the city's fall. The wreck was broken up in situ.
Oswestry Grange	United Kingdom	World War II: Convoy SLS 64: The cargo ship was shelled and sunk in the Atlantic Ocean north west of Madeira (37°10′N 21°20′W) by Admiral Hipper (Kriegsmarine) with the loss of five of her 42 crew. Survivors were rescued by Lornaston (United Kingdom).
Perseus	Greece	World War II: Convoy SLS 64: The cargo ship was shelled and sunk in the Atlantic Ocean north west of Madeira (37°12′N 21°20′W) by Admiral Hipper (Kriegsmarine) with the loss of fourteen of her 36 crew.
René Camaleyre	Vichy France	World War II: The fishing trawler was sunk in the Bay of Biscay (43°30′N 1°42′E) by HMS Tigris (Royal Navy.
Shrewsbury	United Kingdom	World War II: Convoy SLS 64: The cargo ship was shelled and sunk in the Atlantic Ocean north west of Madeira (36°12′N 20°12′W) by Admiral Hipper (Kriegsmarine) with the loss of twenty of her 39 crew.
Uckermark	Germany	World War II: The cargo ship was intercepted off Massawa, Italian Somaliland by HMS Hawkins (Royal Navy). Her crew attempted to scuttle her. She was taken in tow but subsequently sank.
Warlaby	United Kingdom	World War II: Convoy SLS 64: The cargo ship was shelled and sunk in the Atlantic Ocean north west of Madeira (37°12′N 21°20′W) by Admiral Hipper (Kriegsmarine) with the loss of three of her 39 crew.
Westbury	United Kingdom	World War II: Convoy SLS 64: The cargo ship was shelled and sunk in the Atlantic Ocean north west of Madeira (37°10′N 21°20′W) by Admiral Hipper (Kriegsmarine) with the loss of five of her 38 crew.

== 13 February ==
List of shipwrecks: 13 February 1941
Ship	State	Description
Arthur F. Corwin	United Kingdom	World War II: Convoy HX 106: The tanker straggled behind the convoy. She was torpedoed and damaged in the Atlantic Ocean (60°25′N 17°11′W) by U-103 (Kriegsmarine). She was then torpedoed and sunk by U-96 (Kriegsmarine) with the loss of all 46 crew.
Askari	Germany	World War II: The cargo ship was torpedoed and damaged off Kismayu, Italian Somaliland by aircraft based on HMS Eagle (Royal Navy). She came ashore and was a total loss.
Clea	United Kingdom	World War II: Convoy HX 106: The tanker straggled behind the convoy. She was torpedoed and sunk in the Atlantic Ocean (60°25′N 17°10′W) by U-96 (Kriegsmarine) with the loss of all 59 crew.
Moncalieri	Italy	World War II: Operation Composition: The 5,723 GRT cargo ship was bombed and damaged at Massawa, Italian Somaliland by aircraft based on HMS Formidable (Royal Navy). She was scuttled in April.
Pensilvania	Italy	World War II: The 6,861 GRT tanker escaping from Chisimaio to Mogadishu with a cargo of fuel, was intercepted, shelled and set on fire off Mogadishu by HMS Hawkins, HMS Shropshire and aircraft based on HMS Eagle (all Royal Navy). The ship was beached, burned out and wrecked.
HMT Rubens	Royal Navy	World War II: Convoy OG 52: The naval trawler was bombed and sunk in the Atlantic Ocean (48°50′N 14°20′W) by a Focke-Wulf Fw 200 aircraft of I Staffeln, Kampfgeschwader 40, Luftwaffe with the loss of all 21 hands.

== 14 February ==
List of shipwrecks: 14 February 1941
Ship	State	Description
Belcrest	United Kingdom	World War II: Convoy SC 21: The cargo ship straggled behind the convoy. She was torpedoed and sunk in the Atlantic Ocean (approximately 54°N 21°W) by Michele Bianchi (Regia Marina) with the loss of all 36 crew.
Dromara	United Kingdom	The 723 GRT coaster on a voyage from Derry for London with a cargo of bog ore, ran into a strong gale and her cargo began to shift prompting her crew to abandon her. The ship drifted ashore on Old Man of Wick, and subsequently sank (58°25.361′N 04°04.743′W)
Elisabeth Marie	United Kingdom	World War II: Convoy SC 21: The coaster straggled behind the convoy. She was bombed and sunk in the Atlantic Ocean (54°58′N 12°30′W) by Focke-Wulf Fw 200 aircraft of I Staffeln, Kampfgeschwader 40, Luftwaffe with the loss of one of her 25 crew. Survivors were rescued by HMCS Ottawa (Royal Canadian Navy).
Holystone	United Kingdom	World War II: Convoy OB 284: The cargo ship straggled behind the convoy. She was torpedoed and sunk in the Atlantic Ocean by U-123 (Kriegsmarine) with the loss of all 40 crew.
HM MTB 41	Royal Navy	World War II: The White 73-foot-class motor torpedo boat struck a mine and sank in the North Sea with the loss of two of her crew.
Raimondo A.	Italy	The 25 GRT sailing vessel ran into a storm and was wrecked west of Zuara.

== 15 February ==
List of shipwrecks: 15 February 1941
Ship	State	Description
Alnmoor	United Kingdom	World War II: Convoy SC 21: The cargo ship straggled behind the convoy. She was torpedoed and sunk in the Atlantic Ocean 400 nautical miles (740 km) south west of Rockall, Inverness-shire (55°40′N 25°15′W) by Michele Bianchi (Regia Marina) or by U-123 (Kriegsmarine) with the loss of all hands, variously reported as 42 or 55.
Furão	Portugal	The tug foundered at the mouth of Sado with the loss of seven of her crew.
Marguerite I	Belgium	The cargo ship collided with Robert (United Kingdom) and sank in the North Sea off Flamborough Head, Yorkshire (53°51′N 0°25′E) with the loss of two of her crew.
Paris	United Kingdom	World War II: The collier collided with Woodstock (United Kingdom) in the North Sea off Robin Hood's Bay, Yorkshire (54°26′N 0°24′W). She was beached at Boggle Hole. She broke her back on 25 February and was consequently declared a total loss.
Portugal	Portugal	The replica of a 16th century Indiaman was wrecked/sunk at dock in Belem in a cyclone. The wreck was later raised and converted into a coastal barge and operated as SS Nazare.
Woodstock	United Kingdom	The collier collided with André Thomé (France) and sank in the North Sea.

== 16 February ==
List of shipwrecks: 16 February 1941
Ship	State	Description
Coryton	United Kingdom	World War II: The cargo ship was bombed and damaged in the North Sea off the Farne Islands, Northumberland by Luftwaffe aircraft. She was beached in Budle Bay with the loss of one of her 40 crew. Coryton was declared a total loss.
Empire Otter	United Kingdom	World War II: The tanker struck a mine and sank in the English Channel 25 nautical miles (46 km) south west of Hartland Point, Devon. Her crew were rescued.
Juventus	Italy	World War II: The 4,957 GRT cargo ship on a trip from Naples for Sfax, was torpedoed and heavily damaged in the Mediterranean Sea (35°36′N 11°18′E) by Fairey Swordfish aircraft of 830 Squadron, Fleet Air Arm. She was abandoned and subsequently ran aground 3 nautical miles (5.6 km) north east of Kuriat Island and was wrecked. Her 24 crew survived.
Naniwa	United Kingdom	World War II: The fishing trawler was bombed and sunk in the Atlantic Ocean (52°15′N 12°30′W) by Focke-Wulf Fw 200 aircraft of I Staffeln, Kampfgeschwader 40, Luftwaffe with the loss of five of her crew.
HMT Ormonde	Royal Navy	World War II: The naval trawler was bombed and sunk in the North Sea off Peterhead, Aberdeenshire by Luftwaffe aircraft with the loss of eighteen of her crew.
HMT Southsea	Royal Navy	World War II: The auxiliary minesweeper struck a mine in the North Sea off the mouth of the River Tyne and was beached with the loss of seven of her crew. She was declared a total loss.
Thomas Deas	United Kingdom	World War II: The 125.5-foot (38.3 m), 275-ton fishing trawler, a sold off non-standard Castle-class naval trawler, struck a mine and sank in the North Sea 4 nautical miles (7.4 km) east of Spurn Point, Yorkshire with the loss of all thirteen hands.

== 17 February ==
List of shipwrecks: 17 February 1941
Ship	State	Description
Ben Rein	United Kingdom	World War II: The coaster struck a mine and sank in the English Channel off Falmouth, Cornwall with the loss of three of her crew.
Casamance	United Kingdom	World War II: Convoy WN 83: The 5,817 GRT cargo ship and a trip from Duala for Hull with general cargo, ran aground in the North Sea off Skinningrove, Yorkshire (54°34′30″N 0°54′00″W) with the loss of nine of her 47 crew. She broke in two and was declared a total loss.
Edwy R. Brown	United Kingdom	World War II: Convoy HX 107: The tanker straggled behind the convoy. She was torpedoed and sunk in the Atlantic Ocean (approximately 61°N 18°W) by U-103 (Kriegsmarine) with the loss of all 50 crew.
Empire Knoll	United Kingdom	The 2,824 GRT collier on a trip from Hartlepool for Lisbon and Huelva with a cargo of coal, came ashore in a gale at Tynemouth, Northumberland and was wrecked.
Gairsoppa	United Kingdom	World War II: Convoy SL 64: The cargo ship straggled behind the convoy. She was torpedoed and sunk in the Atlantic Ocean (she was last reported at 50°00′N 14°00′W) by U-101 (Kriegsmarine) with the loss of 85 of her 86 crew.
Kyle Rona	United Kingdom	The coaster departed from Maryport, Cumberland for Portreath, Cornwall. She was subsequently reported missing, presumed foundered, with the loss of all eight crew.
Patriotismo	Portugal	The schooner foundered in the Atlantic Ocean off Peniche with the loss of one of her eight crew.
Siamese Prince	United Kingdom	World War II: The cargo ship was torpedoed and sunk in the Atlantic Ocean (59°53′N 12°12′W) by U-69 (Kriegsmarine) with the loss of all 57 people aboard.
Tevere	Regia Marina	World War II: The 8,289 GRT hospital ship hit a magnetic mine while entering Tripoli roadstead, and sank in shallow water with a loss of 4 crew. Towed to port of Tripoli, but never repaired.

== 18 February ==
List of shipwrecks: 18 February 1941
Ship	State	Description
Black Osprey	United Kingdom	World War II: Convoy HX 107: The 5,589 GRT cargo ship on a trip from Halifax for Newport with a cargo of steel and trucks, straggled behind the convoy. She was torpedoed and sunk in the Atlantic Ocean (61°30′N 18°10′W) by U-96 (Kriegsmarine) with the loss of 25 crew of her 36 crew. Survivors were rescued by Mosdale (Norway).
Duquesa	Germany	World War II: The stores ship, which had been captured by Admiral Scheer (Kriegsmarine) on 18 December 1940, was scuttled.
Herzogin	Germany	World War II: The captured British cargo liner was scuttled in the South Atlantic.
Marie Gilberte	(France) Vichy French Navy	The auxiliary minesweeper was lost on this date.
Middleton	United Kingdom	World War II: Convoy SC 21: The cargo ship collided with Tungsha (Norway) and sank in the Atlantic Ocean (55°07′30″N 5°27′00″W). Her crew survived.
Seaforth	United Kingdom	World War II: The 5,459 GRT cargo ship on a trip from Monrovia for Liverpool, was torpedoed and sunk in the Atlantic Ocean (58°48′N 18°17′W) by U-103 (Kriegsmarine) with the loss of all 59 people aboard.

== 19 February ==
List of shipwrecks: 19 February 1941
Ship	State	Description
Algarve	United Kingdom	World War II: The cargo ship was torpedoed and sunk in the North Sea off Sheringham, Norfolk by S-102 (Kriegsmarine) with the loss of all 27 hands.
Benjamin Franklin	Norway	World War II: Convoy HX 107: The cargo ship straggled behind the convoy. She was torpedoed and sunk in the Atlantic Ocean (58°50′N 16°30′W) by U-103 (Kriegsmarine). All 36 crew were rescued; seven by HMS Pimpernel (Royal Navy) and 29 by Memphis (Egypt), but the latter would be lost when that vessel foundered on 28 February.
Empire Blanda	United Kingdom	World War II: Convoy HX 107: The cargo ship straggled behind the convoy. She was torpedoed and sunk in the Atlantic Ocean south of Iceland by U-69 (Kriegsmarine) with the loss of all 40 crew.
Enak	Germany	World War II: The tug struck a mine and sank in the Ems.
Fulham II	United Kingdom	World War II: The cargo ship struck a mine in the North Sea off the mouth of the River Tyne and was beached. She was later refloated and towed to Jarrow, Northumberland.
Gracia	United Kingdom	World War II: Convoy OB 287: The cargo ship was bombed and sunk in the Atlantic Ocean (59°39′N 7°24′W) by a Focke-Wulf Fw 200 aircraft of the Luftwaffe. Her 48 crew were rescued.
Guilvinec	France	World War II: The cargo ship was torpedoed and sunk in the Bay of Biscay 60 nautical miles (110 km) west of Saint Nazaire, Loire-Inférieure (44°48′N 3°01′W) by HMS Tigris (Royal Navy).
Housatonic	United Kingdom	World War II: Convoy OB 287: The tanker was bombed and sunk in the Atlantic Ocean (59°39′N 7°24′W) by Focke-Wulf Fw 200 aircraft of the Luftwaffe with the loss of three of her 34 crew.
Jacobsen	France	World War II: The cargo ship was torpedoed and sunk in the Bay of Biscay off Bayonne, Basses-Pyrénées by HMS Tigris (Royal Navy).
Jessmore	United Kingdom	The cargo ship (4,099 GRT, 1921) collided with Baron Haig (United Kingdom) in the Atlantic Ocean off the west coast of Ireland (54°00′N 16°56′W). She was taken in tow, but sank on 21 February.
Lycia	United Kingdom	World War II: The Admiralty-requisitioned cargo ship was sunk in Scapa Flow as a blockship.

== 20 February ==
List of shipwrecks: 20 February 1941
Ship	State	Description
Fort Médine	Free French Naval Forces	World War II: Convoy SC 21: The cargo ship (5,355 GRT) struck a mine and sank in the Bristol Channel off Swansea, Glamorgan (51°35′N 3°56′W). All 47 crew survived but the master died of his wounds the next day. She was on a voyage from Wabana, Dominion of Newfoundland to Swansea.
Grigorios C. II	Greece	World War II: The cargo ship was captured and scuttled in the Indian Ocean west of the Seychelles (2°00′N 15°30′W) by Admiral Scheer (Kriegsmarine). Her 27 crew were rescued and made prisoners of war.
HMT Marjory M. Hastie	Royal Navy	World War II: The 244 GRT naval trawler struck a mine off the mouth of the River Tyne and was beached at Whitburn, County Durham. She was refloated on 14 March.
HMT Ouse	Royal Navy	World War II: The Mersey-class trawler, whilst sweeping Tobruk harbor, struck mines laid by Heinkel He-111 planes of III./KG.4 and sank with the loss of twelve of her 21 crew.
Rigmor	United Kingdom	The cargo ship was bombed and sunk in the English Channel off Falmouth, Cornwall (49°54′N 5°51′W) by an aircraft of Kampfgeschwader 2, Luftwaffe. All twenty crew were rescued by HMS Clare (Royal Navy).
Queenforth	United Kingdom	World War II: The tug was bombed and sunk at Swansea by Luftwaffe aircraft. She was raised in 1942.

== 21 February ==
List of shipwrecks: 21 February 1941
Ship	State	Description
Canadian Cruiser	United Kingdom	World War II: The cargo ship was shelled and sunk in the Indian Ocean (6°36′S 47°18′E) by Admiral Scheer (Kriegsmarine). Her crew were rescued and made prisoners of war.
HMT Lincoln City	Royal Navy	World War II: The naval trawler was bombed and sunk at Tórshavn, Faroe Islands by Luftwaffe aircraft.

== 22 February ==
List of shipwrecks: 22 February 1941
Ship	State	Description
A. D. Huff	United Kingdom	World War II: The cargo ship was shelled and sunk in the Atlantic Ocean (47°12′N 40°13′W) by Gneisenau (Kriegsmarine) with the loss of two of her crew. Survivors were taken as prisoners of war.
HMT Edouard Van Vlaenderen	Royal Navy	The 138.8-foot (42.3 m), 338-ton naval trawler was wrecked at Olofsfjordur, Iceland, a Total Loss.
Harlesden	United Kingdom	World War II: The tanker was shelled and sunk in the Atlantic Ocean (47°12′N 40°18′W) by Gneisenau (Kriegsmarine) with the loss of seven of her 41 crew. Survivors were taken as prisoners of war.
Kantara	United Kingdom	World War II: The cargo ship was shelled and sunk in the Atlantic Ocean (47°12′N 40°13′W) by Gneisenau (Kriegsmarine). Her crew were taken as prisoners of war.
Kingston Hill	United Kingdom	World War II: The cargo ship was bombed and damaged north west of the Outer Hebrides by Luftwaffe aircraft and was abandoned by her crew. She was towed into Loch Ewe on 25 February. Subsequently repaired and returned to service.
Lustrous	United Kingdom	World War II: The tanker was shelled and sunk in the Atlantic Ocean (47°12′N 40°13′W) by Scharnhorst (Kriegsmarine). Her 37 crew were taken as prisoners of war.
Marcello	Regia Marina	World War II: The Marcello-class submarine was sunk in the Atlantic Ocean west of the Hebrides, Scotland by HMS Montgomery (Royal Navy).
Rantaupandjang	Netherlands	World War II: The cargo ship was shelled and sunk in the Indian Ocean (8°24′S 51°35′E) by Admiral Scheer (Kriegsmarine) with the loss of two of her crew. Survivors were taken as prisoners of war.
Scottish Standard	United Kingdom	World War II: Convoy OB 287: The tanker straggled behind the convoy after being bombed and damaged by a Focke-Wulf Fw 200 Kondor aircraft of I Staffeln, Kampfgeschwader 40, Luftwaffe on 20 February. She was torpedoed and sunk in the Atlantic Ocean (59°20′N 16°12′W) by U-96 (Kriegsmarine) with the loss of five of her 44 crew. Survivors were rescued by HMS Montgomery (Royal Navy).
Texelstroom	Netherlands	World War II: The cargo ship was torpedoed and sunk in the Atlantic Ocean 25 nautical miles (46 km) off the coast of Iceland (63°15′N 20°30′W) by U-108 (Kriegsmarine) with the loss of all 25 crew.
Trelawny	United Kingdom	World War II: The cargo ship was shelled and sunk in the Atlantic Ocean (47°12′N 40°13′W) by Gneisenau (Kriegsmarine) with the loss of one of her 40 crew. Survivors were taken as prisoners of war.

== 23 February ==
List of shipwrecks: 23 February 1941
Ship	State	Description
Anglo Peruvian	United Kingdom	World War II: Convoy OB 288: The 5,457 GRT cargo ship on a trip from Tyne for Boston with a cargo of coal, was torpedoed and sunk in the Atlantic Ocean (59°30′N 21°00′W) by U-96 (Kriegsmarine) with the loss of 29 of her 46 crew. Survivors were rescued by Harberton (United Kingdom).
HMS Manistee	Royal Navy	World War II: Convoy OB 288: The 5,360 GRT ocean boarding vessel was torpedoed and sunk in the Atlantic Ocean (58°55′N 20°50′W) by U-107 (Kriegsmarine) and Michele Bianchi (Regia Marina) with the loss of all 141 crew.
Marslew	United Kingdom	World War II: The cargo ship (4,542 GRT) on a trip from Glasgow for Villa Constitución with general cargo, was torpedoed and sunk in the Atlantic Ocean (59°18′N 21°30′W) by U-69 (Kriegsmarine) with the loss of thirteen of her 36 crew. Survivors were rescued by Empire Cheetah (United Kingdom).
Shoal Fisher	United Kingdom	World War II: The coaster (698 GRT) on a voyage from Barrow for Devonport with a cargo of ammunition and naval guns, struck a mine and sank in the English Channel south off Dodman Point (50°40′N 4°50′W). The entire crew was rescued and taken to Falmouth.
Silvia Tripcovich	Italy	World War II: The cargo ship (2,365 GRT) travelling in a convoy from Trapani for Tripoli was torpedoed and sunk in the Mediterranean Sea off Kuriat Island, Tunisia (33°34′N 11°45′E) by HMS Upright (Royal Navy) with the loss of all 39 hands.

== 24 February ==
List of shipwrecks: 24 February 1941
Ship	State	Description
British Gunner	United Kingdom	World War II: Convoy OB 289: The 6,894 GRT tanker on a passage from Swansea for Aruba in ballast, was torpedoed and sunk in the Atlantic Ocean 273 nautical miles (506 km) north East of Cape Wrath, Sutherland (61°09′N 12°04′W) by U-97 (Kriegsmarine) with the loss of three of her 44 crew. Survivors were rescued by HMS Petunia (Royal Navy).
Cape Nelson	United Kingdom	World War II: Convoy OB 288: The 3,807 GRT cargo ship on a passage from Hull for New York in ballast, was torpedoed and sunk in the Atlantic Ocean south west of Iceland (59°30′N 21°00′W) by U-95 (Kriegsmarine) with the loss of four of her 38 crew. Survivors were rescued by Haberton (United Kingdom).
HMS Dainty	Royal Navy	World War II: The D-class destroyer was bombed and sunk in the Mediterranean Sea off Tobruk, Libya by Junkers Ju 88 aircraft of III Staffeln, Lehrgeschwader 1, Luftwaffe with the loss of sixteen of her 145 crew.
Grootekerk	Netherlands	World War II: The 8,685 GRT cargo ship on a trip from Swansea for Singapore with general cargo and coal, was torpedoed and sunk in the Atlantic Ocean (56°57′N 23°48′W) by U-123 (Kriegsmarine) with the loss of all 52 crew.
Huntingdon	United Kingdom	World War II: Convoy OB 288: The cargo ship was torpedoed and sunk in the Atlantic Ocean (58°25′N 20°23′W) by Michele Bianchi (Regia Marina). All 66 crew were rescued by Papalemos (Greece).
Jonathan Holt	United Kingdom	World War II: Convoy OB 289: The 4,973 GRT cargo ship on a trip from Liverpool for Douala and other West African ports with general cargo, was torpedoed and sunk in the Atlantic Ocean (61°10′N 11°55′W) by U-97 (Kriegsmarine) with the loss of 51 of her 57 crew. Survivors were rescued by Copeland (United Kingdom and HMS Petunia (Royal Navy).
Linaria	United Kingdom	World War II: Convoy OB 288: The 3,385 GRT cargo ship on a trip from Tyne for Halifax with a cargo of coal, was torpedoed and sunk in the Atlantic Ocean approximately 265 nautical miles (491 km) south of Reykjavík (59°45′N 20°48′W) by U-96 (Kriegsmarine) with the loss of all 35 crew.
Louis Charles Schiaffino	Free France	World War II: The cargo ship was torpedoed and sunk in the Gulf of Philippeville east of Collo, Algeria by Heinkel He 111 aircraft of II Staffeln, Kampfgeschwader 26, Luftwaffe.
Mansepool	United Kingdom	World War II: Convoy OB 289: The 4,894 GRT cargo ship on a passage from Cardiff for Halifax in ballast, was torpedoed and sunk in the Atlantic Ocean (61°01′N 12°00′W) by U-97 (Kriegsmarine) with the loss of two of her 41 crew. Survivors were rescued by HMS Petunia (Royal Navy) and Thomas Holt (United Kingdom).
Nailsea Lass	United Kingdom	World War II: Convoy SLS 64: The 4,289 GRT cargo ship on a trip from Calcutta for London with a cargo of charcoal and pig iron, straggled behind the convoy. She was torpedoed and sunk in the Atlantic Ocean 60 nautical miles (110 km) south west of the Fastnet Rock by U-48 (Kriegsmarine) with the loss of five of her 36 crew. Two of the survivors were taken as prisoners of war. The rest reached land in their lifeboats.
Sirikishna	United Kingdom	World War II: Convoy OB 288: The 5,458 GRT cargo ship on a passage from Barry for Halifax in ballast, was torpedoed and sunk in the Atlantic Ocean (approximately 58°N 21°W) by U-96 (Kriegsmarine) with the loss of all 43 crew.
Svein Jarl	Norway	World War II: Convoy OB 288: The 1,908 GRT cargo ship on a passage from Methil for Halifax in ballast, was torpedoed and sunk in the Atlantic Ocean (59°30′N 21°00′W) by U-95 (Kriegsmarine) with the loss of all 22 crew.
Temple Moat	United Kingdom	World War II: Convoy OB 288: The 4,427 GRT cargo ship on a trip from Blyth for Buenos Aires with a cargo of coal, straggled behind the convoy. She was torpedoed and sunk in the Atlantic Ocean (59°27′N 20°20′W) by U-95 (Kriegsmarine) with the loss of all 42 crew.
HMS Terror	Royal Navy	World War II: The Erebus-class monitor was bombed and damaged in the Mediterranean Sea at Benghazi, Libya by Luftwaffe aircraft on 22 February. She then triggered two mines as she left port. She was again bombed by Luftwaffe aircraft on the evening of the next day and was taken in tow by HMS Fareham and HMS Salvia (both Royal Navy). She was scuttled on the morning of 24 February off Derna, Libya. Her crew were evacuated to HMS Fareham and HMS Salvia.
Waynegate	United Kingdom	World War II: Convoy OB 288: The 4,260 GRT cargo ship on a trip from Newport for Freetown with a cargo of coal, was torpedoed and sunk in the Atlantic Ocean (58°50′N 21°47′W) by U-73 (Kriegsmarine). Her 41 crew were rescued by Léopard (Marine Nationale).

== 25 February ==
List of shipwrecks: 25 February 1941
Ship	State	Description
Armando Diaz	Regia Marina	World War II: The Condottieri-class cruiser was torpedoed and sunk in the Mediterranean Sea off Sfax, Tunisia (33°34′N 11°45′E) by HMS Upright (Royal Navy) with the loss of 484 of her crew.
HMS Exmoor	Royal Navy	World War II: Convoy FN 417: The Hunt-class destroyer was either mined or torpedoed by S-30 (Kriegsmarine), in the North Sea off Great Yarmouth, Norfolk and sunk with the loss of 104 of her 136 crew. Survivors were rescued by the fishing trawler Commander Evans (United Kingdom) and HMS Shearwater (Royal Navy).
Globe	United Kingdom	World War II: The Thames barge struck a mine and sank in the Thames Estuary off Sheerness, Kent with the loss of two of her crew.
R-61 Guidonia	Regia Marina	The 66 GRT auxiliary minesweeper, a converted motor schooner, was hit by a bomb and set afire during the night raid on Tripoli by 9 Vickers Wellington bombers of No. 148 Squadron RAF. She eventually sank.
HMS Sarna	Royal Navy	World War II: The naval whaler struck a mine and was beached in the Suez Canal with the loss of a crew member.
Torgeir I	Norway	The cargo ship was holed by ice and sank in the Skagerrak 10 nautical miles (19 km) off the Grønningen Lighthouse.

== 26 February ==
List of shipwrecks: 26 February 1941
Ship	State	Description
Amstelland	Netherlands	World War II: The cargo ship was bombed and damaged in the Atlantic Ocean (54°12′N 16°00′W) by Luftwaffe aircraft. Her crew left the ship but her captain fell in the sea and drowned. He was the only casualty. The ship was taken in tow by the tug Ierse See (Netherlands) but sank on 28 February (54°10′N 14°38′W).
Beursplein	Netherlands	World War II: The cargo ship was bombed and damaged in the Atlantic Ocean (54°12′N 16°00′W) by Luftwaffe aircraft with the loss of 21 of her crew. She was abandoned and sank the next day.
Brackelier	United Kingdom	World War II: The motor barge struck a mine and sank at Hull, Yorkshire. She was towing dumb barge Monarch (United Kingdom), which also struck a mine and sank. A total of three crew were lost from the two vessels.
Borgland	Norway	World War II: Convoy OB 290: The cargo ship was torpedoed and sunk in the Atlantic Ocean off Rockall, Inverness-shire (55°50′N 14°00′W) by U-47 (Kriegsmarine). Her 32 crew were rescued by HMS Pimpernel (Royal Navy).
Göteborg	Sweden	World War II: The coaster was torpedoed and sunk in the Atlantic Ocean south east of Iceland by U-70 (Kriegsmarine) with the loss of all 23 crew.
H 415 Schaumburg-Lippe	Kriegsmarine	World War II: The naval drifter struck a mine and sank in the Ems.
Kasongo	Belgium	World War II: Convoy OB 290: The cargo ship was torpedoed and sunk in the Atlantic Ocean off Rockall (55°50′N 14°20′W) by U-47 (Kriegsmarine) with the loss of six of her 46 crew. Survivors were rescued by HMS Campanula (Royal Navy).
Kyriakoula	Greece	World War II: The cargo ship was bombed and sunk in the Atlantic Ocean (55°02′N 16°25′W) by Luftwaffe aircraft. Her 28 crew were rescued.
Llanwern	United Kingdom	World War II: Convoy OB 290: The cargo ship was bombed and sunk in the Atlantic Ocean (54°07′N 17°06′W) by Luftwaffe aircraft with the loss of 27 of her 39 crew.
Mahanada	United Kingdom	World War II: Convoy OB 290: The cargo ship was bombed and sunk in the Atlantic Ocean (54°07′N 17°06′W) by Focke-Wulf Fw 200 aircraft of the Luftwaffe with the loss of three of her 94 crew.
Melmore Head	United Kingdom	World War II: Convoy OB 290: The cargo ship was bombed and damaged in the Atlantic Ocean (55°07′N 16°00′W) and was abandoned. She was taken in tow and beached in Kames Bay, Isle of Bute on 5 March. Later beached at Rothesay Bay awaiting repairs.
Minorca	United Kingdom	World War II: The cargo ship was torpedoed and sunk in the North Sea off Cromer, Norfolk (53°04′N 1°23′E) by S-28 (Kriegsmarine) with the loss of nineteen of the 22 people aboard.
Rydboholm	Sweden	World War II: Convoy OB 290: The cargo ship was torpedoed and damaged in the Atlantic Ocean 500 nautical miles (930 km)) west of Ireland (55°32′N 14°24′W) by U-47 (Kriegsmarine. She was then bombed and sunk at 55°48′N 14°25′W by Luftwaffe aircraft. Her 28 crew were rescued by HMS Pimpernel (Royal Navy).
Solferino	Norway	World War II: The cargo ship was bombed and sunk in the Atlantic Ocean (55°02′N 16°25′W) by Focke-Wulf Fw 200 Kondor aircraft of the Luftwaffe with the loss of three of her 31 crew.
Springfontein	Netherlands	World War II: The cargo ship exploded, caught fire, and sank at Freetown, Sierra Leone.
Swinburne	United Kingdom	World War II: Convoy OB 290: The cargo ship was bombed and sunk in the Atlantic Ocean (54°00′N 16°58′W) by Luftwaffe aircraft. Her 44 crew were rescued.
Teneriffa	Norway	World War II: The cargo ship was bombed and sunk in the Bristol Channel (51°30′N 4°55′W) by Luftwaffe aircraft. Her 36 crew were rescued by Perdita (United Kingdom).

== 27 February ==
List of shipwrecks: 27 February 1941
Ship	State	Description
Adele Ohlrogge	Germany	World War II: The cargo ship struck a mine and sank in the Jade Bight.
Christabelle	United Kingdom	World War II: The fishing trawler struck a mine and sank in the Atlantic Ocean (61°27′N 6°05′W) with the loss of ten of her crew.
Empire Tiger	United Kingdom	World War II: Convoy HX 109: The cargo ship was reported in the Atlantic Ocean heading for the Clyde. No further trace, lost with all 34 hands.
Noss Head	United Kingdom	World War II: The cargo ship sank in the North Sea off Gardenstown, Aberdeenshire with the loss of all twelve hands.
Old Charlton	United Kingdom	World War II: The cargo ship (1,556 GRT) was bombed and sunk in the North Sea off Felixstowe (51°57′N 1°40′E) by Luftwaffe aircraft with the loss of a crew member. Survivors were rescued by Catherine Hawksfield (United Kingdom).
Ramb I	Regia Marina	Ramb I World War II: Action of 27 February 1941: The auxiliary cruiser (3,667 GRT) was shelled and sunk in the Indian Ocean off the Maldive Islands by HMNZS Leander ( (United Kingdom) (Royal New Zealand Navy). One man was killed by the shellfire and 103 survivors were rescued by HMNZS Leander, one of which died of his wounds the same day.
HMT Remillo	Royal Navy	World War II: The naval trawler struck a mine and sank in the Humber with the loss of seventeen of her crew.
Stanwold	United Kingdom	The cargo ship was last sighted in the English Channel 10 nautical miles (19 km) west south west of Selsey Bill, Sussex. Presumed foundered with the loss of all hands.
Stjørnfjord	Norway	The auxiliary schooner ran aground at Madsøgalten in Leka Municipality, and was wrecked.

== 28 February ==
List of shipwrecks: 28 February 1941
Ship	State	Description
Anchises	United Kingdom	World War II: The cargo ship was bombed and sunk in the Atlantic Ocean 140 nautical miles (260 km) west of Bloody Foreland, County Donegal, Ireland (55°30′N 13°17′W) by Luftwaffe aircraft with the loss of sixteen of the 185 people on board. Survivors were rescued by HMCS Assiniboine (Royal Canadian Navy) and HMS Kingcup (Royal Navy).
Baltistan	United Kingdom	World War II: Convoy OB 290: The cargo ship was torpedoed and sunk in the Atlantic Ocean (51°52′N 19°55′W) by Michele Bianchi (Regia Marina) with the loss of 51 of the 69 people aboard.
Bore VIII	Finland	The cargo ship foundered in the Hubertgat, off the coast of Lower Saxony, Germany.
Cabenda	United Kingdom	World War II: The cargo ship (534 GRT) struck a mine and sank in the Bristol Channel off Swansea, Glamorgan (51°34′N 3°54′W) with the loss of a crew member. She was on a voyage from Shoreham-by-Sea, Sussex to Briton Ferry, Glamorgan.
Effna	United Kingdom	World War II: The Design 1105 ship was torpedoed and sunk in the Atlantic Ocean (61°30′N 15°45′W) by U-108 (Kriegsmarine) with the loss of all 34 crew.
Holmelea	United Kingdom	World War II: Convoy HX 109: The cargo ship straggled behind the convoy. She was torpedoed, shelled and sunk in the Atlantic Ocean (54°24′N 17°25′W) by U-47 (Kriegsmarine) with the loss of 28 of her 39 crew. Survivors were rescued by the fishing trawler Baldur (Iceland).
MA/SB 3	Royal Navy	World War II: The motor anti-submarine boat struck a mine and was beached in the Suez Canal. There were no casualties. She was refloated on 3 March and towed to Suez, Egypt.
Memphis	Egypt	The cargo ship foundered in the Atlantic Ocean (56°40′N 10°20′W) with the loss of all aboard, including 29 survivors of Benjamin Franklin (Norway).
Persier	Belgium	The cargo ship ran aground off Myrdalladur, Iceland, during a storm and was severely damaged. She was later refloated and towed to Reykjavík for repairs.

== Unknown date ==
List of shipwrecks: Unknown date 1941
Ship	State	Description
Thor	Kriegsmarine	World War II: The Thor-class gunboat was sunk at Vlissingen, Zeeland, Netherlands by Allied aircraft sometime in February.
