= Italian submarine Michele Bianchi =

Italian submarine

History

Italy
- Name: Michele Bianchi
- Builder: CRDA (Monfalcone, Italy)
- Launched: 3 December 1939
- Fate: Sunk on 5 July 1941

General characteristics
- Class & type: Marconi-class submarine
- Displacement: 1,175 long tons (1,194 t) standard; 1,465 long tons (1,489 t) full load
- Length: 76.5 m (251 ft 0 in)
- Beam: 6.81 m (22 ft 4 in)
- Draught: 4.72 m (15 ft 6 in)
- Propulsion: Diesel engines, 3,600 hp (2,685 kW) (surfaced); Electric motors 1,500 hp (1,119 kW) (submerged); 2 shafts
- Speed: 17.8 knots (33.0 km/h; 20.5 mph) surfaced; 8.2 kn (15.2 km/h; 9.4 mph) submerged
- Complement: 57
- Armament: 1 × 100 mm (4 in) / 47 caliber gun; 4 × 13.2 mm anti-aircraft guns; 8 × 21 in (533 mm) torpedo tubes (4 bow, 4 stern); 12 torpedoes

Michele Bianchi was a Marconi-class submarine of the Italian Regia Marina that saw action in the Second World War. The submarine, (pennant number BH), was launched on 3 December 1939.

Her first war patrol was in the Mediterranean Sea from 15 August to 3 September 1940. Michele Bianchi sailed on 27 October 1940 and reached the Strait of Gibraltar on 3 November. Her attempted transit to the Atlantic was detected by Royal Navy forces, and Michele Bianchi took refuge in the neutral port of Tangier. Michele Bianchi left Tangier on 12 November and reached Bordeaux on 18 December 1940.

Michele Bianchi sank four ships on her first BETASOM patrol from Bordeaux; but the next patrol from 30 April to 30 May 1941 was unsuccessful. After sailing from Bordeaux on 4 July 1941, Michele Bianchi was torpedoed and sunk with all hands by HMS Tigris on 5 July.

Ships sunk by Michele Bianchi
Patrol	Date	Ship	Flag	Tonnage	Notes
4th	14 February 1941	Belcrest	United Kingdom	4,517	Freighter from Convoy SC 21; no survivors
4th	15 February 1941	Alnmoor	United Kingdom	6,573	Steam merchant from Convoy SC 21; no survivors
4th	24 February 1941	Huntingdon	United Kingdom	10,946	Freighter from Convoy OB 288; no casualties
4th	27 February 1941	Baltistan	United Kingdom	6,803	Freighter; 18 survivors from a crew of 69
Total:				22,266	
