= SS Hertford =

British ship torpedoed in 1942

Coordinates: 40°30′0.0″N 63°18′36″W

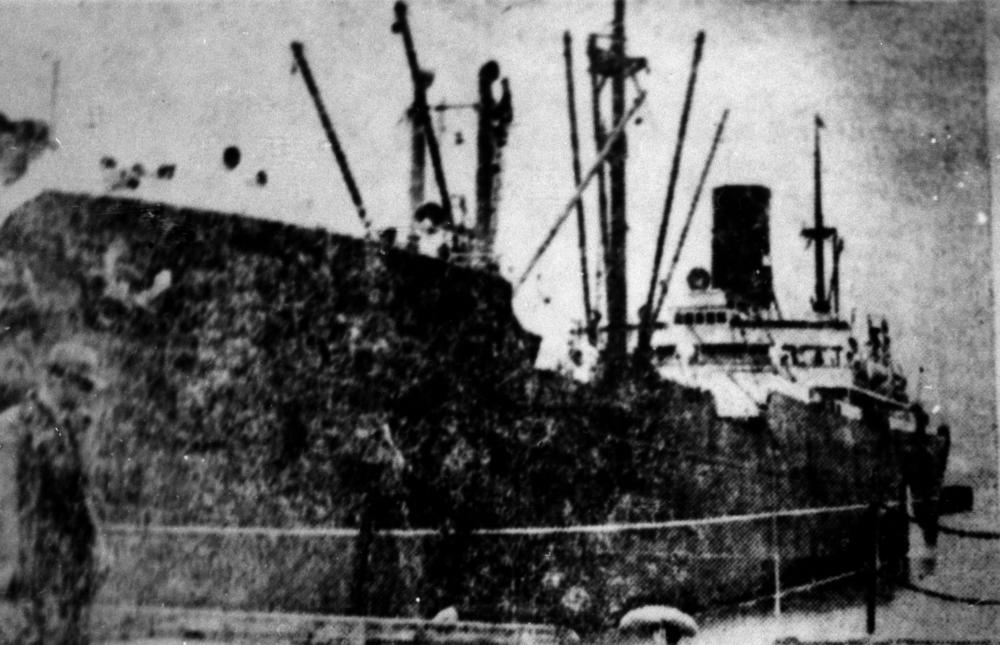
- SS Hertford

History
- Name: 1917: Rheinland; 1920: Friesland; 1922: Hertford
- Namesake: 1917: Rhineland; 1920: Frisia; 1922: Hertford
- Owner: 1920: HAPAG; 1920: Shipping Controller; 1922: Federal Steam
- Operator: 1921: Glen Line; 1922: Federal Steam
- Port of registry: (United Kingdom) London
- Route: Britain – Australia / New Zealand
- Builder: Bremer Vulkan, Vegesack
- Yard number: 577
- Launched: October 1917
- Identification: UK official number 144656; code letters KGFB (until 1933); call sign GDKB (1934 onward)
- Fate: Sunk by torpedo, 29 March 1942

General characteristics
- Type: refrigerated cargo ship
- Tonnage: 10,923 GRT, 6,889 NRT
- Length: 520.7 ft (158.7 m) registered length
- Beam: 64.2 ft (19.6 m)
- Draught: 31 ft 10 in (9.70 m)
- Depth: 38.1 ft (11.6 m)
- Decks: 3
- Installed power: by 1930: 1,290 NHP
- Propulsion: as built: 2 × screws powered by; 2 × triple expansion engines; by 1930: as above, plus; 2 × exhaust steam turbines
- Speed: by 1930: 14 knots (26 km/h)
- Capacity: 409,099 cubic feet (11,584 m^{3}) refrigerated hold space
- Crew: 1942: 60 plus 2 DEMS gunners
- Sensors & processing systems: by 1930: wireless direction finding
- Armament: DEMS
- Notes: sister ships: Cumberland, Huntingdon, Norfolk

SS Hertford was a refrigerated cargo steamship that was launched in Germany in 1917, seized by the United Kingdom in 1920 as World War I reparations, and sunk by a U-boat in 1942 with the loss of four members of her crew.

She was launched as Rheinland for Hamburg America Line, but was completed in 1920 as Friesland. The UK Shipping Controller seized her that same year, and in 1922 sold her to the Federal Steam Navigation Co Ltd, who renamed her Hertford.

This was the first of two ships in the Federal Steam fleet to be called Hertford. The second was a motor ship that was built in England in 1948, transferred to P&O in 1973, sold and renamed in 1976 and scrapped in 1985.

== Building ==
Bremer Vulkan built Rheinland at Bremen-Vegesack, launching her in October 1917. Bremer Vulkan then built her sister ships Sauerland in 1918, Wendland in 1919 and Münsterland in 1920.

The First World War delayed Rheinland's completion until June 1920, when HAPAG renamed her Friesland. Her registered length was 520.7 ft (158.7 m), her beam was 64.2 ft (19.6 m) and her depth was 38.1 ft (11.6 m). As built, her tonnages were 11,305 GRT and 7,067 NRT. Her holds had 409,099 cu ft (11,584 m^{3}) of refrigerated cargo space. Rheinland had two screws, each driven by a triple expansion engine.

In 1920 the UK Government seized Friesland and her three sisters under Article 231 of the Treaty of Versailles. Friesland was given the UK official number 145104 and code letters KGFB and registered in London. The Shipping Controller placed her under the management of Glen Line of London.

== Federal Steam fleet ==
Federal Steam operated a cargo liner service between New Zealand, Australia and the UK, bringing refrigerated produce to the UK and general cargo to Australia and New Zealand. The company lost three cargo ships to enemy action in the First World War.

The UK Government supplied Friesland and her three sisters to Federal Steam as reparations. Federal Steam named its ships after English counties or county towns. Friesland became Hertford, Sauerland became Norfolk (10,948 GRT), Wendland became Cumberland (10,939 GRT) and Münsterland became Huntingdon (11,305 GRT). Federal also bought Vogtland, which became Cambridge (11,066 GRT). All 5 of them were sunk in World War II.

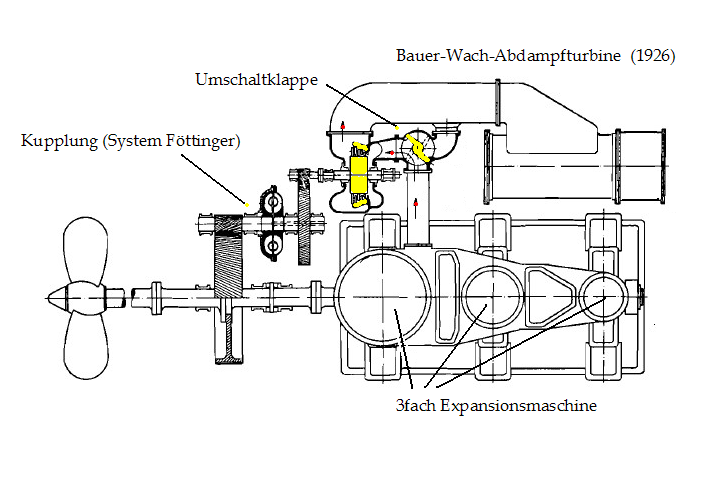
Plan of a triple-expansion piston engine with Bauer-Wach exhaust turbine system

By 1930 Bremer Vulkan had supplied Hertford with a pair of Bauer-Wach exhaust turbines. Each turbine was powered by the exhaust steam from the low-pressure cylinder of one of her piston engines, and drove the same propeller shaft as that piston engine via a Föttinger fluid coupling. The turbines increased Huntingdon's fuel efficiency, raised her total power to 1,290 NHP and gave her a speed of 14 knots (26 km/h).

Also by 1930 Hertford's navigation equipment included wireless direction finding.

In 1934 the call sign GDKB superseded Hertford's code letters. From 1937 her net register tonnage was repeatedly revised. By 1941 it was finally assessed as 6,776 tons.

== Second World War service ==
In the Second World War Hertford continued her trade between Australasia and Britain. Occasionally she sailed in convoys, but mostly she sailed unescorted. In December 1939, May 1940 and March 1942 she passed through the Panama Canal. In August 1940 she called at Cape Town and Freetown en route from Fremantle to Liverpool.

=== Mine damage and repair ===
In November 1940 the German auxiliary cruiser Pinguin planted three rows of mines across the mouth of the Spencer Gulf in South Australia. On 3 December Hertford left Fremantle carrying 6,000 tons of general cargo. On 7 December she struck one of Pinguin's mines off Liguanea Island, about 25 nautical miles (46 km) west-southwest of the Neptune Islands.

The mine blew a 40 by 20 feet (12 by 6 m) hole in Hertford's side, ruptured her fuel oil bunkers and damaged her frame, but she remained afloat. She was towed to Port Lincoln for initial repairs. She was then towed to Outer Harbor, where divers made temporary repairs strong enough for her to steam to Sydney to be dry docked and permanently repaired.

=== Loss ===
Hertford returned to service on 20 January 1942, loaded general cargo, and left Sydney two days later. She spent eight days in Brisbane loading further general cargo, followed by six days in Wellington loading lamb, pork and beef. She passed through the Panama Canal on 18–19 March and then set course for Halifax, Nova Scotia to join a convoy to Britain.

On 29 March 1942 Hertford was zigzagging at 12 knots (22 km/h) when German submarine U-571 fired two torpedoes at her about 200 nautical miles (370 km) south of Halifax. One hit her number four hold near her engine room bulkhead, killing her seventh engineer, a stoker and a greaser who were on watch, and destroying one of her four lifeboats.

Hertford settled rapidly by her stern, and her surviving crew abandoned ship in her remaining three lifeboats. At 2131 hrs a further torpedo from U-571 hit her, and she sank four minutes later.

The lifeboats became separated. On 1 April the Glen Line cargo steamship Glenstrae, en route from New York to Halifax, found one of the boats and rescued its 21 occupants. Two days later another lifeboat, commanded by Hertford's Master, John Tuckett, and carrying 18 other members of her crew, reached land at Liverpool, Nova Scotia. One of its occupants, Chief Steward Benjamin McMahon, had caught pneumonia and died in hospital.

Five days later the Furness Red Cross coastal passenger liner Fort Townshend found the remaining boat and rescued its 18 occupants, who included two DEMS gunners. Fort Townshend landed the survivors at Halifax, where some of them were hospitalised with frostbite. One of the Second Engineer's legs was amputated, and both of the second refrigerating engineer's legs were amputated below the knee.

== See also ==
- SS Cambridge

== Bibliography ==
- Slader, John (1988). The Red Duster at War. London: William Kimber & Co Ltd. ISBN 0-7183-0679-1.
- Waters, Sydney D (1939). Clipper Ship to Motor Liner; the story of the New Zealand Shipping Company 1873–1939. London: The New Zealand Shipping Company Ltd.
- Waters, Sidney D (1949). German Raiders in the Pacific. Wellington: War History Branch, Department of Internal Affairs – via Victoria University of Wellington.
