= German submarine U-97 (1940) =

German World War II submarine

Coordinates: 33°00′N 34°00′E

History

Nazi Germany
- Name: U-97
- Ordered: 30 May 1938
- Builder: Germaniawerft, Kiel
- Yard number: 602
- Laid down: 27 September 1939
- Launched: 15 August 1940
- Commissioned: 28 September 1940
- Fate: Sunk on 16 June 1943

General characteristics
- Class & type: Type VIIC submarine
- Displacement: 769 tonnes (757 long tons) surfaced; 871 t (857 long tons) submerged
- Length: 67.10 m (220 ft 2 in) o/a; 50.50 m (165 ft 8 in) pressure hull
- Beam: 6.20 m (20 ft 4 in) o/a; 4.70 m (15 ft 5 in) pressure hull
- Height: 9.60 m (31 ft 6 in)
- Draught: 4.74 m (15 ft 7 in)
- Installed power: 2,800–3,200 PS (2,100–2,400 kW; 2,800–3,200 bhp) (diesels); 750 PS (550 kW; 740 shp) (electric)
- Propulsion: 2 shafts; 2 × diesel engines; 2 × electric motors
- Speed: 17.7 kn (32.8 km/h; 20.4 mph) surfaced; 7.6 knots (14.1 km/h; 8.7 mph) submerged
- Range: 8,500 nmi (15,700 km; 9,800 mi) at 10 knots (19 km/h; 12 mph) surfaced; 80 nmi (150 km; 92 mi) at 4 knots (7.4 km/h; 4.6 mph) submerged
- Test depth: 230 m (750 ft); Crush depth: 250–295 m (820–968 ft)
- Complement: 4 officers, 40–56 enlisted
- Armament: 5 × 53.3 cm (21 in) torpedo tubes (four bow, one stern); 14 × torpedoes or 26 TMA mines; 1 × 8.8 cm (3.46 in) deck gun (220 rounds); 1 x 2 cm (0.79 in) C/30 AA gun

Service record
- Part of: 7th U-boat Flotilla; 28 September 1940 – 31 October 1941; 23rd U-boat Flotilla; 1 November 1941 – 30 April 1942; 29th U-boat Flotilla; 1 May 1942 – 16 June 1943
- Identification codes: M 19 988
- Commanders: Oblt.z.S. / Kptlt. Udo Heilmann; 28 September 1940 – May 1942; Oblt.z.S. Friedrich Bürgel; May – 15 October 1942; Oblt.z.S. / Kptlt. Hans-Georg Trox; 2 February 1943 – 16 June 1943
- Operations: 13 patrols: 1st patrol: 17 February – 7 March 1941; 2nd patrol: 20 March – 10 April 1941; 3rd patrol: 1 – 30 May 1941; 4th patrol: 2 July – 8 August 1941; 5th patrol: 20 September – 27 October 1941; 6th patrol: 23 December – 9 January 1942; 7th patrol: a. 12 – 31 January 1942; b. 3 – 8 February 1942; 8th patrol: 14 – 30 March 1942; 9th patrol: 5 April – 12 May 1942; 10th patrol: 15 June – 4 July 1942; 11th patrol: a. 22 July 1942 – 4 August 1942; b. 20 – 29 August 1942; 12th patrol: 10 April – 3 May 1943; 13th patrol: 5 – 16 June 1943
- Victories: 15 merchant ships sunk (64,404 GRT); 1 auxiliary warship sunk (6,833 GRT); 1 merchant ship damaged (9,718 GRT)

German submarine U-97 was a Type VIIC U-boat built for Nazi Germany's Kriegsmarine for service during the Second World War. She carried out thirteen patrols during her career, sinking sixteen ships and damaging a seventeenth. She was a member of two wolfpacks.

U-97 was sunk on 16 June 1943 while operating in the Mediterranean Sea, west of Haifa. She was depth charged by an Australian light bomber.

== Design ==
German Type VIIC submarines were preceded by the shorter Type VIIB submarines. U-97 had a displacement of 769 tonnes (757 long tons) when at the surface and 871 tonnes (857 long tons) while submerged. She had a total length of 67.10 m (220 ft 2 in), a pressure hull length of 50.50 m (165 ft 8 in), a beam of 6.20 m (20 ft 4 in), a height of 9.60 m (31 ft 6 in), and a draught of 4.74 m (15 ft 7 in). The submarine was powered by two Germaniawerft F46 four-stroke, six-cylinder supercharged diesel engines producing a total of 2,800 to 3,200 metric horsepower (2,060 to 2,350 kW; 2,760 to 3,160 shp) for use while surfaced, two AEG GU 460/8–27 double-acting electric motors producing a total of 750 metric horsepower (550 kW; 740 shp) for use while submerged. She had two shafts and two 1.23 m (4 ft) propellers. The boat was capable of operating at depths of up to 230 metres (750 ft).

The submarine had a maximum surface speed of 17.7 knots (32.8 km/h; 20.4 mph) and a maximum submerged speed of 7.6 knots (14.1 km/h; 8.7 mph). When submerged, the boat could operate for 80 nautical miles (150 km; 92 mi) at 4 knots (7.4 km/h; 4.6 mph); when surfaced, she could travel 8,500 nautical miles (15,700 km; 9,800 mi) at 10 knots (19 km/h; 12 mph). U-97 was fitted with five 53.3 cm (21 in) torpedo tubes (four fitted at the bow and one at the stern), fourteen torpedoes, one 8.8 cm (3.46 in) SK C/35 naval gun, 220 rounds, and a 2 cm (0.79 in) C/30 anti-aircraft gun. The boat had a complement of between forty-four and sixty.

== Service history ==
U-97 was laid down at the Friedrich Krupp Germaniawerft in Kiel as yard number 602. She was launched on 15 August 1940 and commissioned on 28 September under the command of Kapitänleutnant Udo Heilmann.

Serving with the 7th U-boat Flotilla, U-97 completed training in late 1940 and early 1941 before commencing operations.

=== First patrol ===
The boat's first patrol began with her departure from Kiel on 17 February 1941. Her route took her across the North Sea and through the gap between Iceland and the Faroe Islands.

She sank three ships on the 24th; Mansepool, Jonathon Holt, both southwest of the Faroe Islands and British Gunner 273 nautical miles (506 km; 314 mi) northwest of Cape Wrath (northern Scotland). Among those lost in the sinking of the Jonathon Holt was the travel writer Robert Byron. The Flower-class corvette HMS Petunia had ordered the crew of British Gunner to abandon their vessel even though the master had said the ship could be towed to safety.

The U-boat then damaged G.C. Brøvig. The Norwegian tanker was a victim of U-97's third attack on Convoy OB 289. The torpedo strike caused her to lose her bow, but the bulkhead held and the engines remained usable. With assistance from HMS Petunia, she arrived at Stornoway (in the Outer Hebrides), on 27 February. She was subsequently repaired and returned to service.

The patrol was somewhat marred when a crew-member was lost overboard on 3 March. The submarine docked at Lorient in occupied France on 7 March.

=== Second patrol ===
U-97 sank three more ships between Cape Farewell (Greenland) and southern Ireland in March and April 1941. They were: Chama and Hørda (on 23 and 24 March respectively) and Conus on 4 April. There were no survivors from Hørda or Conus.

=== Third and fourth patrols ===
The boat sank HMS Camito, an Elders & Fyffes banana boat that had been requisitioned as an Ocean Boarding Vessel and Sangro, west southwest of Cape Clear (southern Ireland) on 6 May 1941. On 8 May she struck again, sinking Ramillies southeast of Cape Farewell.

Sortie number four was relatively uneventful, starting from St. Nazaire on 2 July 1941 and terminating in the same port on 8 August.

=== Fifth patrol ===
Departing St. Nazaire on 20 September 1941, U-97 went south, slipped past the heavily guarded British base at Gibraltar and into the Mediterranean. She sank Pass of Balmaha 50 nmi (93 km; 58 mi) west of Alexandria on 17 October. The merchant ship had been part of the fourth convoy of Operation Cultivate, the relief of Tobruk. She also sank Samos on the same day.

An accident which left the IIWO (second watch officer) badly injured on 24 October forced the boat to cut her patrol short. She arrived at Salamis in Greece on the 27th.

=== Sixth and seventh patrols ===
Human frailties also came to the fore during the boat's sixth patrol when, having crossed the Aegean Sea towards Turkey, she was obliged by a sick crew-member, on 7 January 1942, to return to Salamis on the ninth.

The submarine's seventh patrol started and finished in Salamis.

=== Eighth and ninth patrols ===
Having moved to La Spezia in northwest Italy in February, U-97 was attacked by a Sunderland flying boat of No. 230 Squadron RAF off the North African coast. The aircraft dropped five bombs on the boat, but caused no damage.

Patrol number nine continued the shuttle-sequence between Salamis and La Spezia.

=== Tenth patrol ===
The situation improved for the crew when they sank Zealand and Memos 14 nmi (26 km; 16 mi) southwest of Haifa on 28 June 1942. The Marilyese Moller went to the bottom on 1 July about 27 nmi (50 km; 31 mi) west of Rafah in Palestine. The armed trawler HMS Burra reacted with three depth charges, but was unsuccessful.

=== 11th and 12th patrols ===
These patrols began in Salamis and La Spezia; the latter finished in Pola (now Pula) in Croatia in May 1943.

=== 13th patrol and loss ===
U-97's final patrol started with her departure from Pola on 5 June 1943. She sank Palima 30 nmi (56 km; 35 mi) south southwest of Beirut on the 12th. She was also successful against Athelmonarch northwest of Jaffa on the 15th.

The U-boat was sunk by a Lockheed Hudson of 459 Squadron, Royal Australian Air Force on 16 June 1943 west of Haifa. Twenty-seven men died, there were twenty-one survivors.

=== Wolfpacks ===
U-97 took part in two wolfpacks, namely.

- West (8 – 27 May 1941)
- Goeben (20 – 29 September 1941)

== Summary of raiding history ==
Date	Ship	Nationality	Tonnage (Note: Merchant ship tonnages are in gross register tons. Military vessels are listed by tons displacement.)	Fate
24 February 1941	British Gunner	United Kingdom	6,894	Sunk
24 February 1941	G.C. Brøvig	Norway	9,718	Damaged
24 February 1941	Johnathon Holt	United Kingdom	4,973	Sunk
24 February 1941	Mansepool	United Kingdom	4,894	Sunk
24 March 1941	Chama	United Kingdom	8,077	Sunk
24 March 1941	Hørda	Norway	4,301	Sunk
4 April 1941	Conus	United Kingdom	8,132	Sunk
6 May 1941	HMS Camito	Royal Navy	6,833	Sunk
6 May 1941	Sangro	Italy	6,466	Sunk
8 May 1941	Ramilles	United Kingdom	4,553	Sunk
17 October 1941	Pass of Balmaha	United Kingdom	758	Sunk
17 October 1941	Samos	Greece	1,208	Sunk
28 June 1942	Memas	Greece	1,755	Sunk
28 June 1942	Zealand	United Kingdom	1,433	Sunk
1 July 1942	Marilyse Moller	United Kingdom	786	Sunk
12 June 1943	Palima	Netherlands	1,179	Sunk
15 June 1943	Athelmonarch	United Kingdom	8,995	Sunk

== Bibliography ==
- Busch, Rainer; Röll, Hans-Joachim (1999). German U-boat commanders of World War II : a biographical dictionary. Translated by Brooks, Geoffrey. London, Annapolis, Md: Greenhill Books, Naval Institute Press. ISBN 1-55750-186-6.
- Busch, Rainer; Röll, Hans-Joachim (1999). Der U-Boot-Krieg, 1939-1945: Deutsche U-Boot-Verluste von September 1939 bis Mai 1945 [German U-boat losses from September 1939 to May 1945] (in German). Vol. IV. Hamburg, Berlin, Bonn: Mittler. ISBN 3-8132-0514-2.
- Gröner, Eric; Jung, Dieter; Maass, Martin (1991). German Warships 1815-1945: U-boats and Mine Warfare Vessels. Vol. 2. Translated by Thomas, Keith; Magowan, Rachel. London: Conway Maritime Press. ISBN 0-85177-593-4.
