= SS Cambridge (1916) =

Coordinates: 39°9′32″S 146°29′25″E

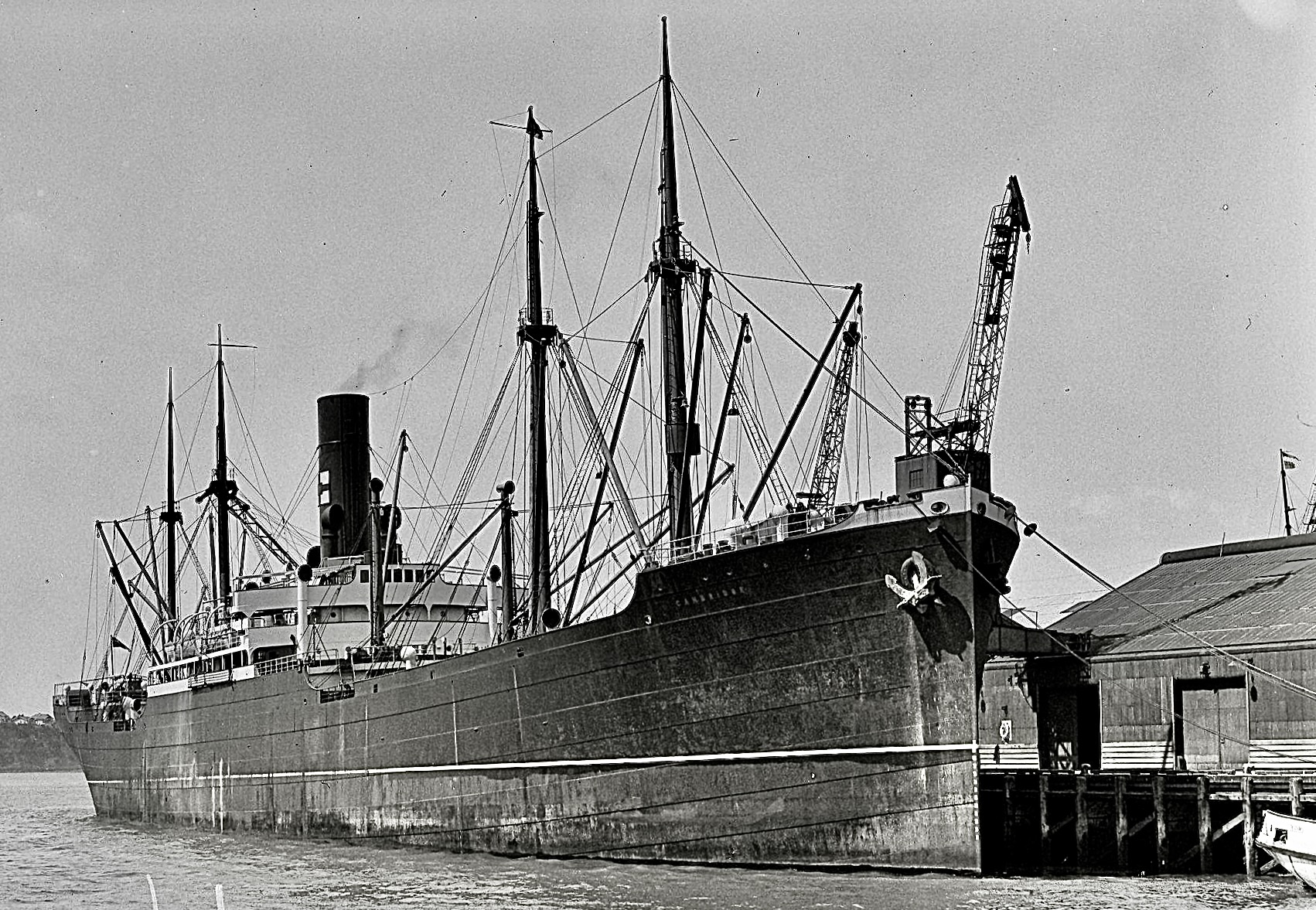
- Cambridge at Auckland

History
- Name: 1916: Vogtland; 1922: Cambridge
- Namesake: 1916: Vogtland; 1919: Cambridge
- Owner: Federal Steam Navigation Co
- Operator: Federal Steam Navigation Co
- Port of registry: 1919: (United Kingdom) London
- Route: Britain – Australia / New Zealand
- Builder: Joh. C. Tecklenborg, Geestemünde
- Yard number: 271
- Launched: 9 December 1916
- Completed: 1919
- In service: 27 November 1919
- Identification: UK official number 144589; code letters KFNP (until 1933); call sign GDFR (from 1934)
- Fate: Sunk by mine, 7 November 1940

General characteristics
- Tonnage: as built: 11,066 GRT, 6,885 NRT, 15,545 DWT; by 1930: 10,846 GRT, 6,678 NRT; 1940: 10,855 GRT, 6,687 NRT
- Displacement: 7,933 tons
- Length: 524.5 ft (159.9 m)
- Beam: 65.7 ft (20.0 m)
- Draught: 29 ft 11 in (9.12 m)
- Depth: 37.3 ft (11.4 m)
- Installed power: 1,106 NHP, 3,475 ihp
- Propulsion: 2 × triple expansion engines; 2 × screws
- Speed: 14 knots (26 km/h)
- Capacity: 418,747 cu ft (11,858 m^{3}) refrigerated cargo
- Complement: 56
- Sensors & processing systems: wireless direction finding

SS Cambridge was a refrigerated steam cargo liner that was built in Germany for the Hamburg America Line. She was launched in 1916 as Vogtland, but after the 1919 Treaty of Versailles the United Kingdom took her as war reparations and sold her to the Federal Steam Navigation Company, who renamed her Cambridge. She operated between Britain and Australasia until 1940, when a German mine sank her off the coast of Australia.

== Building ==
Joh. C. Tecklenborg built Vogtland in Geestemünde as yard number 271. She was launched on 9 December 1916 but the war delayed her completion. Her sea trials were on 27 November 1919.

Her registered length was 524.5 ft (159.9 m), her beam was 65.7 ft (20.0 m) and her depth was 37.3 ft (11.4 m). As built, her tonnages were 11,066 GRT, 6,885 NRT and 15,545 DWT. Her holds had 418,747 cu ft (11,858 m^{3}) of refrigerated cargo space.

Vogtland had two screws, each driven by a triple expansion engine. Between them her twin engines were rated at 1,106 NHP or 3,475 ihp, giving her a speed of 14 knots (26 km/h). The ship had one funnel and four masts.

Vogtland was built for the Hamburg America Line, but when she was completed the UK Government seized her under Article 231 of the Treaty of Versailles. She was given the UK official number 144589 and code letters KFNP.

== Federal Steam fleet ==
Federal Steam lost three cargo ships to enemy action in the First World War. Vogtland was one of five new German ships that the UK government supplied to Federal Steam as reparations. Federal Steam named its ships after English counties or county towns. It renamed the ship Cambridge. The other ships were Friesland, which became Hertford (10,923 GRT), Sauerland became Norfolk (10,948 GRT), Wendland became Cumberland (10,939 GRT) and Münsterland became Huntingdon (11,305 GRT). All 5 of them were sunk in World War II.

Federal Steam operated a cargo liner service between New Zealand, Australia and the UK, bringing refrigerated produce to the UK and general cargo to Australia and New Zealand. By 1930 Cambridge's tonnages had been slightly revised to 10,846 GRT and 6,678 NRT, and her navigation equipment included wireless direction finding.

In 1934 the call sign GDFR replaced her code letters. In 1940 her tonnages were revised to 10,855 GRT and 6,687 NRT.

== Second World War service ==
In the Second World War Cambridge continued her regular trade between New Zealand, Australia and the UK. She sailed mostly unescorted, with convoy protection only in the North Atlantic. She used both the Cape of Good Hope route via South Africa and the trans-Pacific route via the Panama Canal.

=== Loss ===
In August and September 1940 Cambridge was in South Wales. She called at Cardiff, Newport and Swansea. On 9 September 1940 she left Milford Haven with Convoy OB 211. She called at Cape Town on 9–10 October, Adelaide on 2–3 November and Melbourne on 5–7 November. She left Melbourne bound for Sydney and Brisbane.

At 2300 hrs on 7 November 1940 Cambridge was about 2 1/2 nautical miles (4.6 km) southeast of Wilsons Promontory when she struck one of the mines that the German auxiliary cruiser Passat laid in the Bass Strait. The mine struck the after part of the ship, flooding her engine room.

The flood disabled the ship's electricity generators, and hence her main wireless transmitter. Her wireless operator used her emergency wireless set to transmit a distress signal. There was no reply. Cambridge's Master, Captain Paddy Angell, ordered his crew to abandon ship.

Three of Cambridge's lifeboats were launched. Her carpenter, J Kinnear, returned to his cabin to retrieve money. He failed to escape, and his crewmates' efforts to rescue him were unsuccessful. Kinnear was the only fatality. Cambridge sank, stern-first, in 45 minutes.

The auxiliary minesweeper HMAS Orara rescued the occupants of the three lifeboats and took them to Port Welshpool.

Cambridge was one of the first ships to be sunk by enemy action in Australian waters in the Second World War. The next day another of Passat's mines sank City of Rayville off Cape Otway.

== Wreck ==
Cambridge's wreck was found in 1988. It is protected by the Commonwealth of Australia's Historic Shipwrecks Act 1976.

== See also ==
- SS Hertford
- SS Huntingdon

== Bibliography ==
- Gill, G Hermon (1957). Royal Australian Navy 1939–1942. Australia in the War of 1939–1945. Series 2 – Navy. Canberra: Australian War Memorial. p. 270. Archived from the original on 25 May 2009.
- Waters, Sydney D (1939). Clipper Ship to Motor Liner; the story of the New Zealand Shipping Company 1873–1939. London: The New Zealand Shipping Company Ltd.
