= German submarine U-95 (1940) =

German World War II submarine

Coordinates: 36°24′N 3°20′W

History

Nazi Germany
- Name: U-95
- Ordered: 30 May 1938
- Builder: Germaniawerft, Kiel
- Yard number: 600
- Laid down: 16 September 1939
- Launched: 18 July 1940
- Commissioned: 31 August 1940
- Fate: Sunk, 28 November 1941

General characteristics
- Class & type: Type VIIC submarine
- Displacement: 769 tonnes (757 long tons) surfaced; 871 t (857 long tons) submerged
- Length: 67.10 m (220 ft 2 in) o/a; 50.50 m (165 ft 8 in) pressure hull
- Beam: 6.20 m (20 ft 4 in) o/a; 4.70 m (15 ft 5 in) pressure hull
- Height: 9.60 m (31 ft 6 in)
- Draught: 4.74 m (15 ft 7 in)
- Installed power: 2,800–3,200 PS (2,100–2,400 kW; 2,800–3,200 bhp) (diesels); 750 PS (550 kW; 740 shp) (electric)
- Propulsion: 2 shafts; 2 × diesel engines; 2 × electric motors
- Speed: 17.7 knots (32.8 km/h; 20.4 mph) surfaced; 7.6 knots (14.1 km/h; 8.7 mph) submerged
- Range: 8,500 nmi (15,700 km; 9,800 mi) at 10 knots (19 km/h; 12 mph) surfaced; 80 nmi (150 km; 92 mi) at 4 knots (7.4 km/h; 4.6 mph) submerged
- Test depth: 230 m (750 ft); Crush depth: 250–295 m (820–968 ft)
- Complement: 4 officers, 40–56 enlisted
- Armament: 5 × 53.3 cm (21 in) torpedo tubes (four bow, one stern); 14 × torpedoes or 26 TMA mines; 1 × 8.8 cm (3.46 in) deck gun (220 rounds); 1 x 2 cm (0.79 in) C/30 AA gun

Service record
- Part of: 7th U-boat Flotilla; 31 August 1940 – 28 November 1941
- Identification codes: M 13 550
- Commanders: Kptlt. Gerd Schreiber; 31 August 1940 – 28 November 1941
- Operations: 7 patrols: 1st patrol: 20 November – 6 December 1940; 2nd patrol: 16 December 1940 – 14 January 1941; 3rd patrol: 16 February – 19 March 1941; 4th patrol: 12 April – 13 May 1941; 5th patrol: 30 June – 31 July 1941; 6th patrol: 21 August – 20 September 1941; 7th patrol: 19–28 November 1941
- Victories: 8 merchant ships sunk (28,415 GRT); 4 merchant ships damaged (27,916 GRT)

German submarine U-95 was a Type VIIC U-boat of Nazi Germany's Kriegsmarine during World War II. She was laid down on 16 September 1939 by Germaniawerft at Kiel as yard number 600 and commissioned on 31 August 1940. In seven patrols, she sank eight ships for a total of 28,415 gross register tons (GRT) and damaged four other vessels for a total of 27,916 GRT.

U-95 was sunk by a torpedo from the Dutch submarine HNLMS O 21 on 28 November 1941 in the Mediterranean Sea.

== Design ==
German Type VIIC submarines were preceded by the shorter Type VIIB submarines. U-95 had a displacement of 769 tonnes (757 long tons) when at the surface and 871 t (857 long tons) while submerged. She had a total length of 67.10 m (220.1 ft), a pressure hull length of 50.50 m (165.7 ft), a beam of 6.20 m (20.3 ft), a height of 9.60 m (31.5 ft), and a draught of 4.74 m (15 ft 7 in). The submarine was powered by two Germaniawerft F46 four-stroke, six-cylinder supercharged diesel engines producing a total of 2,800 to 3,200 PS (2,060 to 2,350 kW; 2,760 to 3,160 shp) for use while surfaced, two AEG GU 460/8–27 double-acting electric motors producing a total of 750 PS (550 kW; 740 shp) for use while submerged. She had two shafts and two 1.23 m (4.0 ft) propellers. The boat was capable of operating at depths of up to 230 metres (750 ft).

The submarine had a maximum surface speed of 17.7 knots (32.8 km/h; 20.4 mph) and a maximum submerged speed of 7.6 kn (14.1 km/h; 8.7 mph). When submerged, the boat could operate for 80 nautical miles (150 km; 92 mi) at 4 knots (7.4 km/h; 4.6 mph); when surfaced, she could travel 8,500 nmi (15,700 km; 9,800 mi) at 10 kn (19 km/h; 12 mph). U-95 was fitted with five 53.3 cm (21 in) torpedo tubes (four fitted at the bow and one at the stern), fourteen torpedoes, one 8.8 cm (3.46 in) SK C/35 naval gun, 220 rounds, and a 2 cm (0.79 in) C/30 anti-aircraft gun. The boat had a complement of between forty-four and sixty.

== Service history ==
U-95 was a member of two wolfpacks.

=== First patrol ===
The boat left Kiel for her first patrol on 20 November 1940. She entered the Northern Atlantic Ocean and damaged Ringhorn on the 28th with her deck gun, having missed with two torpedoes. The merchantman was hit in the funnel and near the bridge, but the action could not be brought to a successful conclusion because of weather conditions. The Germans, believing the ship would sink, left the area but the crew re-boarded her and sailed to Belfast Lough.

U-95 also damaged Conch on 2 December. This ship had already been hit by U-47 about 370 nautical miles (690 km; 430 mi) west of Bloody Foreland (Ireland). The boat fired four torpedoes, one of which struck the vessel. She was eventually sunk by U-99.

The submarine headed for her new French Atlantic base, arriving at Lorient on 6 December.

=== Second patrol ===
U-95 continued the business of damaging ships when she attacked, but did not sink, Walotira 124 nautical miles (230 km; 143 mi) northwest of Rockall on 26 December 1940. This vessel met her end due to the actions of U-99 on the 27th.

=== Third patrol ===
The boat left Lorient on 16 February 1941 for her third sortie. She sank Cape Nelson and Temple Moat south of Iceland on the 24th.

When Pacific went down on 2 March north of Rockall, there was only one survivor. The destruction of the neutral Murjek was even more bloody. She went to the bottom with all hands on the fifth.

U-95 returned to France, but to St. Nazaire on 19 March.

=== Fourth patrol ===
The boat maintained her success on her fourth patrol, sinking Taranger 150 nautical miles (280 km; 170 mi) southwest of Reykjavík in Iceland on 3 May 1941. 1930 Built as TARANGER at Burmeister & Wains Maskin- & Skibsbyggeri, København, Danmark for Westfal-Larsen & Co. A/S, Bergen. Launched 12/02, delivered in April. Torpedoed and sunk 03/05 by the German submarine U-95 (Kapitänleutnant Gerd Schreiber) abt. 150 nm South West of Reykjavík, Iceland whilst on a voyage from Liverpool, England via Panama to Vancouver, BC, Canada in ballast. 1 man died. 31 survivors.

=== Fifth patrol ===
For her fifth patrol, U-95 damaged Palma west southwest of Bantry Bay (Ireland) on 20 July 1941. One hit with her deck gun was reported when three rounds had struck their target.

=== Sixth patrol ===
U-95's only kill on her sixth foray was Trinidad. The relatively small ship was sunk with 37 rounds from the boat's deck gun due west of La Rochelle on 6 September 1941.

=== Seventh patrol and loss ===
The submarine successfully forced the heavily defended Strait of Gibraltar and entered the Mediterranean Sea. She was sunk by a torpedo from the Dutch submarine O 21 southwest of Almeria in Spain on 28 November 1941.

35 men died with the U-boat; there were 12 survivors.

=== Wolfpacks ===
U-95 took part in two wolfpacks, namely:

- Bosemüller (28 August - 2 September 1941)
- Seewolf (2 – 14 September 1941)

== Summary of raiding history ==
Date	Name	Nationality	Tonnage (GRT)	Fate
27 November 1940	Irene Maria	United Kingdom	1,862	Sunk
28 November 1940	Ringhorn	Norway	1,298	Damaged
2 December 1940	Conch	United Kingdom	8,376	Damaged
26 December 1940	Waiotira	United Kingdom	12,823	Damaged
24 February 1941	Cape Nelson	United Kingdom	3,807	Sunk
24 February 1941	Svein Jarl	Norway	1,908	Sunk
24 February 1941	Temple Moat	United Kingdom	4,427	Sunk
2 March 1941	Pacific	United Kingdom	6,034	Sunk
5 March 1941	Murjek	Sweden	5,070	Sunk
3 May 1941	Taranger	Norway	4,873	Sunk
20 July 1941	Palma	United Kingdom	5,419	Damaged
6 September 1941	Trinidad	Panama	434	Sunk

== See also ==
- Mediterranean U-boat Campaign (World War II)

== Bibliography ==
- Busch, Rainer; Röll, Hans-Joachim (1999). German U-boat commanders of World War II : a biographical dictionary. Translated by Brooks, Geoffrey. London, Annapolis, Md: Greenhill Books, Naval Institute Press. ISBN 1-55750-186-6.
- Busch, Rainer; Röll, Hans-Joachim (1999). Der U-Boot-Krieg, 1939-1945: Deutsche U-Boot-Verluste von September 1939 bis Mai 1945 [German U-boat losses from September 1939 to May 1945] (in German). Vol. IV. Hamburg, Berlin, Bonn: Mittler. ISBN 3-8132-0514-2.
- Gröner, Eric; Jung, Dieter; Maass, Martin (1991). German Warships 1815-1945: U-boats and Mine Warfare Vessels. Vol. 2. Translated by Thomas, Keith; Magowan, Rachel. London: Conway Maritime Press. ISBN 0-85177-593-4.
