= Convoy SC 20 =

World War II convoy of merchant ships

Convoy SC.20
- Part of World War II
Date	22 January 1941 – 8 February 1941
Location	North Sea

Belligerents
(Nazi Germany) Germany	Royal Canadian Navy; United Kingdom

Commanders and leaders
Admiral Karl Dönitz	

Strength
~3 U-boats	48 merchant ships 7 escorts

Casualties and losses
	5 ships sunk 1 Damaged

Convoy SC 20 was the 20th of the numbered series of World War II Slow Convoys of merchant ships from Sydney, Cape Breton Island to Liverpool. The trade convoy left Halifax on 22 January 1941 and was found by U-boats of the 2nd and 9th Flotillas, operating from Lorient and Brest, respectively. Five ships were sunk before the convoy reached Liverpool on 8 February.

== Ships in the convoy ==
Name	Flag	Tonnage (GRT)	Notes
Alcor (1920)	Netherlands	3,526	
Allende (1928)	United Kingdom	5,081	
HMS Arbutus	Royal Navy		Escort 4 Feb - 8 Feb; Corvette
Baron Ogilvy (1926)	United Kingdom	3,391	
Baron Yarborough (1928)	United Kingdom	3,388	
Bernhard (1924)	Norway	3,563	Returned with engine defects and a sick man
Biafra (1933)	United Kingdom	5,405	
Blairesk (1925)	United Kingdom	3,300	
Calafatis (1917)	Greece	4,443	Romped and sunk by a Focke-Wulf Fw 200 naval bomber, of I./KG.40, with the loss of 18 of her 31 crew
HMS Camellia	Royal Navy		Escort 4 Feb - 8 Feb; Corvette
Cape Corso (1929)	United Kingdom	3,807	
Copeland (1923)	United Kingdom	1,526	Rescue ship
Coryton (1928)	United Kingdom	4,553	
Coultarn (1938)	United Kingdom	3,759	
Dione II (1936)	United Kingdom	2,660	Romped and sunk by U-93 on 4 Feb
Einar Jarl (1921)	Norway	1,858	
Emmy (1914)	Greece	3,895	Returned
Empire Engineer (1921)	United Kingdom	5,358	Straggled and sunk by U-123 On 4 Feb
HMS Erica	Royal Navy		Escort 4 Feb - 08 Feb
Evviva (1921)	Norway	1,597	Returned
Flensburg (1922)	Netherlands	6,421	
Flowergate (1911)	United Kingdom	5,161	Arrived with furnace defects
Fylingdale (1924)	United Kingdom	3,918	
Hadleigh (1930)	United Kingdom	5,222	
HMS Harvester	Royal Navy		Escort 4 Feb - 8 Feb; Destroyer
Ila (1939)	Norway	1,583	Returned
Inger Toft (1920)	United Kingdom	2,190	
Ingertre (1921)	Norway	2,462	
Ioannis M Embiricos (1934)	Greece	3,734	Bombed and sunk northwest of Ireland, by a Focke-Wulf Fw 200 naval bomber, of I./KG.40 She was en route from Montreal to Preston with lumber.
Kordecki (1930)	Poland	1,975	Returned
Lars Kruse (1923)	United Kingdom	1,807	
Lylepark (1929)	United Kingdom	5,186	Returned
Maclaren (1915)	United Kingdom	2,350	Wrecked, salvaged, repaired
Manchester Division (1918)	United Kingdom	6,048	
Maplecourt (1894)	Canada	3,388	Sunk by U-107 On 4 Feb
Maplewood (1930)	United Kingdom	4,566	Capt A G Maundrell (Commodore)
Mathilda (1920)	Norway	3,650	
Milcrest (1919)	United Kingdom	5,283	
Myson (1927)	France	4,564	
Narocz (1915)	Poland	1,795	Returned
HMCS Otter	Royal Canadian Navy		Escort 22 Jan - 23 Jan; Armed yacht
HMS Philante	Royal Navy		Escort 4 Feb - 8 Feb; Armed yacht, acting as convoy escort vessel
Pilar De Larrinaga (1918)	United Kingdom	7,046	
Pontypridd (1924)	United Kingdom	4,458	
Quistconck (1918)	United Kingdom	5,144	
Ranella (1912)	Norway	5,590	Straggler from BHX 104
HMS Ranpura	Royal Navy		Escort 22 Jan - 4 Feb; Armed merchant cruiser
Rolf Jarl (1920)	Norway	1,917	
Rozenburg (1918)	Netherlands	2,068	Returned
Selbo (1921)	Norway	1,778	
Sevill (1921)	United Kingdom	1,383	
Sinnington Court (1928)	United Kingdom	6,910	Returned
Telesfora De Larrinaga (1920)	United Kingdom	5,780	
Trident (1917)	United Kingdom	4,317	
Willesden (1925)	United Kingdom	4,563	

== Bibliography ==
- Blair, Clay (1996). Hitler's U-boat War:The Hunters 1939–1942. New York: Random House. ISBN 0-394-58839-8.
- Hague, Arnold (2000). The Allied Convoy System 1939–1945. ISBN 1-86176-147-3.
