= Convoy HG 53 =

Convoy during naval battles of the Second World War

Convoy
- Part of World War II
Date	8–11 February 1941
Location	North Atlantic
Result	German victory

Belligerents
Kriegsmarine	Royal Navy

Commanders and leaders
KL Nicolai Clausen	R Adm. OH Dawson

Strength
1 U-boat; 5 bombers 1 heavy cruiser	21 merchant ships 2 escorts

Casualties and losses
1 bomber	9 merchant ships sunk (15,217 tons)

Convoy HG 53 was the 53rd of the numbered series of World War II HG convoys of Homeward bound merchant ships from Gibraltar to Liverpool. Convoy HG 53 lost nine ships during a coordinated attack in February 1941. HG 53 was one of the few Atlantic convoys to have ships sunk by submarines, by aircraft, and by surface ships.

== Background ==
Twenty-one ships departed Gibraltar on 6 February 1941 bound for Liverpool and escorted by the V and W-class destroyer Velox and the Grimsby-class sloop HMS Deptford. The convoy commodore was Rear Admiral Sir OH Dawson aboard Dagmar.

== Action ==
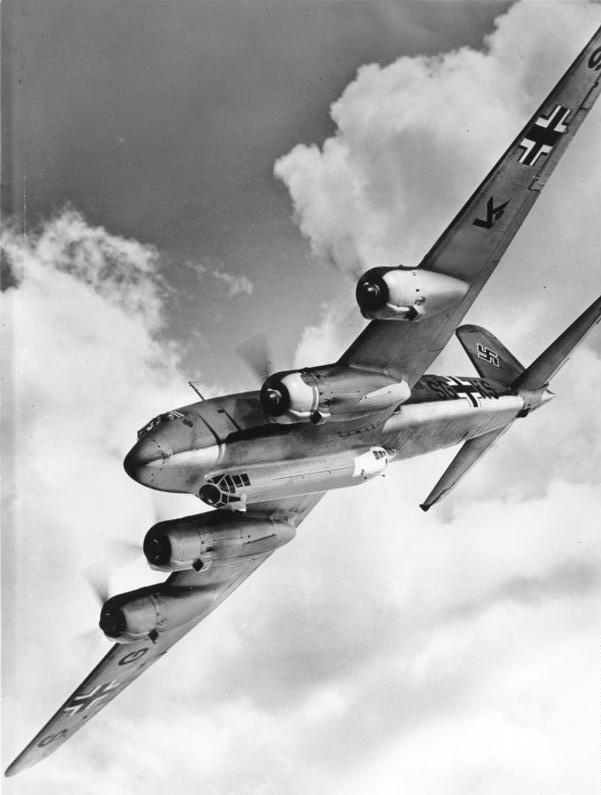
Convoy HG 53 was attacked by five of these KG 40 bombers.

While southbound to African waters on the evening of 8 February German Type IX submarine U-37 sighted the convoy southwest of Cape St. Vincent and torpedoed the British freighters Courland and Estrellano after midnight. U-37 reported the convoy to Bordeaux-Mérignac Air Base and commenced shadowing the convoy providing beacon signals for Kampfgeschwader 40. Five Focke-Wulf Fw 200 Condor bombers took off at dawn and found the convoy at noon 400 miles (640 km) southwest of Lisbon. The Fw 200s bombed from an altitude of 150 feet (46 m) because they lacked bombsights. Each flight mechanic fired at their target ship with a ventral machine gun during the approach to discourage anti-aircraft gunners; but one of the bombers was hit in a wing fuel tank and crash-landed in Spain when fuel was exhausted on the return trip. Six of the twenty bombs dropped hit ships, sinking the convoy commodore's freighter Dagmar, the Norwegian freighter Tejo, and British freighters Britannic, Jura, and Varna. U-37 sank the British freighter Brandenburg after dark and continued sending beacon signals for the German cruiser Admiral Hipper. Admiral Hipper found and sank the straggling British freighter Iceland on 11 February.

== Aftermath ==
Hipper was distracted from further search by finding convoy SL 64 and sinking seven ships from that unescorted convoy. The escort of convoy HG 53 was reinforced by the Grimsby-class sloop Londonderry on 18 February, by the F-class destroyer Fury on 20 February, and by the S-class destroyer Sabre, the Town-class destroyer Leamington, and the Flower-class corvette HMS Anemone from convoy OG 53 on 22 February. The surviving 12 ships of convoy HG 53 arrived in Liverpool on 24 February 1941. Nine ships totaling 15,217 GRT had been sunk.

== Merchant ships in convoy ==
Name	Flag	Casualties	Tonnage (GRT)	Cargo	Sunk by...
Brandenburg	United Kingdom	23	1,473	Ore	U-37
Britannic II	United Kingdom	1	2,490	Ore	KG 40 bomber
Courland	United Kingdom	30	1,325	General	U-37
Coxwald	United Kingdom		1,124	Scrap iron	
Dagmar I	United Kingdom	5	2,471	Oranges	KG 40 bomber
Dago	United Kingdom		1,757	Oranges	
Disa	Sweden		2,002	Ore	
Egyptian Prince	United Kingdom		3,490	Oranges	
Empire Lough	United Kingdom		2,824	Ore	
Empire Tern	United Kingdom		2,479	Ore	
Empire Warrior	United Kingdom		1,306	Ore	
Estrellano	United Kingdom	6	1,982	General	U-37
Iceland	United Kingdom		1,236	Oranges	Admiral Hipper
Jura	United Kingdom	17	1,759	Ore	KG 40 bomber
Marklyn	United Kingdom		3,090	Ore	
Ousel	United Kingdom		1,533	Ore	
Sally Maersk	United Kingdom		3,252	General	
Tejo	Norway	4	967	General	KG 40 bomber
Vanellus	United Kingdom		1,886	Ore	
Varna	United Kingdom		1,514	Pit props	KG 40 bomber
Wrotham	United Kingdom		1,884	Ore	

== See also ==
- Convoy Battles of World War II

== Sources ==
- Bekker, Cajus (1964). The Luftwaffe War Diaries. New York: Ballantine Books.
- Blair, Clay (1996). Hitler's U-Boat War — The Hunters 1939–1942. Random House. ISBN 0-394-58839-8.
- Hague, Arnold (2000). The Allied Convoy System 1939–1945. Naval Institute Press. ISBN 1-55750-019-3.
- Rohwer, J.; Hummelchen, G. (1992). Chronology of the War at Sea 1939–1945. Naval Institute Press. ISBN 1-55750-105-X.
