= SS Huntingdon (1920) =

Coordinates: 58°25′N 20°23′W

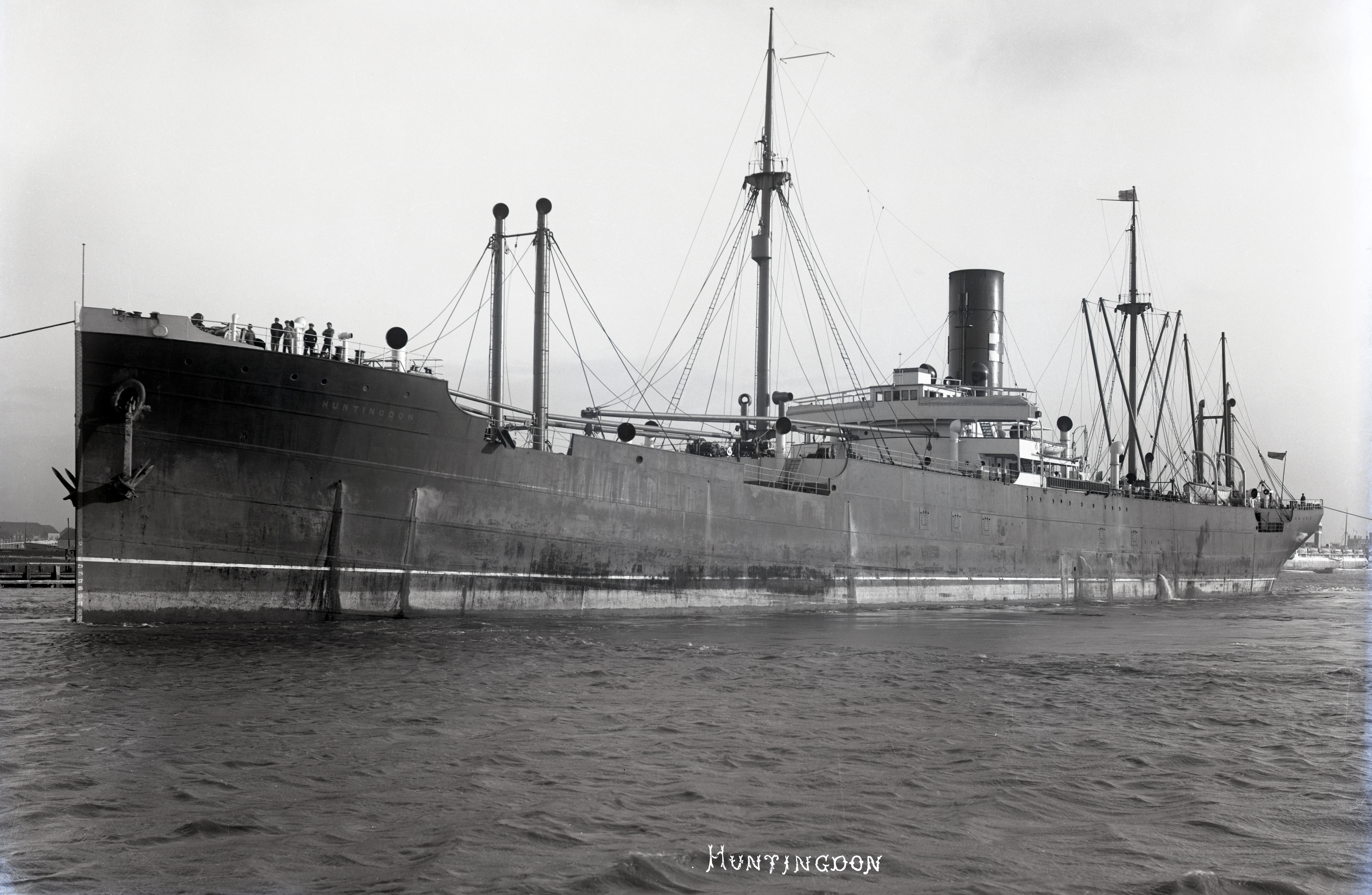
- SS Huntingdon

History
- Name: 1920: Münsterland; 1922: Huntingdon
- Namesake: 1920: Münsterland; 1922: Huntingdon
- Owner: 1920: Shipping Controller; 1922: Federal Steam Navigation Co
- Operator: 1921: Alfred McIntosh & Co; 1922: Federal Steam Navigation Co
- Port of registry: (United Kingdom) London
- Route: Britain – Australia / New Zealand
- Builder: Bremer Vulkan, Bremen-Vegesack
- Yard number: 588
- Completed: 1920
- Identification: UK official number 145104; code letters KGWL (until 1933); call sign GJFZ (1934 onward)
- Fate: Sunk by torpedo, 24 February 1941

General characteristics
- Tonnage: 1921: 11,305 GRT, 7,067 NRT; 1930: 10,951 GRT, 6,929 NRT; 1940: 10,946 GRT, 6,806 NRT
- Length: 520.7 ft (158.7 m)
- Beam: 64.2 ft (19.6 m)
- Draught: 31 ft 10 in (9.70 m)
- Depth: 38.1 ft (11.6 m)
- Installed power: as built: 1,115 NHP; from 1931: 1,270 NHP
- Propulsion: as built: 2 × screws powered by; 2 × triple expansion engines; from 1931: as above plus; 2 × exhaust steam turbines
- Speed: 14 knots (26 km/h)
- Capacity: 409,583 cu ft (11,598 m^{3}) refrigerated cargo
- Crew: 67
- Sensors & processing systems: by 1930: wireless direction finding; by 1940: echo sounding device
- Notes: sister ships: Cumberland, Hertford, Norfolk

SS Huntingdon was a refrigerated steam cargo liner that was built in Germany in 1920 as Münsterland. The United Kingdom took her as war reparations and sold her to the Federal Steam Navigation Company, who renamed her Huntingdon. She operated between Britain and Australasia until 1941, when an Italian submarine sank her in the Atlantic Ocean.

This was the first of two ships in the Federal Steam fleet to be called Huntingdon. The second was a motor ship that was built in Scotland in 1948, transferred to P&O in 1973 and scrapped in 1975.

== Building ==
In 1917 Bremer Vulkan in Bremen-Vegesack built the refrigerated cargo liner Friesland. Bremer Vulkan then built her sister ships Sauerland in 1918, Wendland in 1919 and Münsterland in 1920.

Münsterland's registered length was 520.7 ft (158.7 m), her beam was 64.2 ft (19.6 m) and her depth was 38.1 ft (11.6 m). As built, her tonnages were 11,305 GRT and 7,067 NRT. Her holds had 409,583 cu ft (11,598 m^{3}) of refrigerated cargo space.

Münsterland had two screws, each driven by a triple expansion engine. Between them her twin engines were rated at 1,115 NHP.

The UK Government seized Münsterland and her three sisters under Article 231 of the Treaty of Versailles. Münsterland was given the UK official number 145104 and code letters KGWL and registered in London. The Shipping Controller placed her under the management of Alfred McIntosh and Company of Leith.

== Federal Steam fleet ==
Federal Steam operated a cargo liner service between New Zealand, Australia and the UK, bringing refrigerated produce to the UK and general cargo to Australia and New Zealand. The company lost three cargo ships to enemy action in the First World War.

The UK Government supplied Münsterland and her three sisters to Federal Steam as reparations. Federal Steam named its ships after English counties or county towns. Friesland became Hertford, Sauerland became Norfolk, Wendland became Cumberland and Münsterland became Huntingdon. Federal also bought Vogtland, which became Cambridge (11,066 GRT). All 5 of them were sunk in World War II.

By 1930 Huntingdon's tonnages had been slightly revised to 10,951 GRT and 6,929 NRT, and her navigation equipment included wireless direction finding.

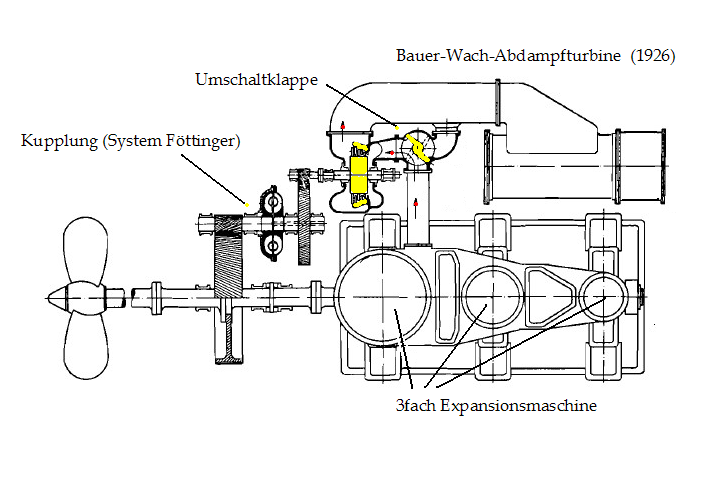
Plan of a triple-expansion piston engine with Bauer-Wach exhaust turbine system

By 1931 Bremer Vulkan had supplied Huntingdon with a pair of Bauer-Wach exhaust turbines. Each turbine was powered by the exhaust steam from the low-pressure cylinder of one of her piston engines, and drove the same propeller shaft as that piston engine via a Föttinger fluid coupling. The turbines increased Huntingdon's fuel efficiency, and raised her total power to 1,270 NHP.

In 1934 the call sign GJFZ replaced her code letters. By 1940 her navigation equipment included an echo sounding device and her tonnages were revised to 10,946 GRT and 6,806 NRT.

== Second World War service ==
In the Second World War Huntingdon continued her regular trade between New Zealand, Australia and the UK. She sailed mostly unescorted, with convoy protection only in the North Atlantic. She used both the Cape of Good Hope route via South Africa and the trans-Pacific route via the Panama Canal.

=== Loss ===
On 19 February 1941 Huntingdon left the Firth of Clyde with Convoy OB 288. At 0235 hrs on 24 February the Italian submarine Michele Bianchi hit Huntingdon with one torpedo, which blew a large hole in the port side of her number one hold. Her Master, Captain Styrin, ordered his crew to abandon ship. All the crew got safely away in the lifeboats, which then stood clear of the ship. It was snowing and bitterly cold.

Michele Bianchi fired a second torpedo, which hit Huntingdon at 0312 hrs. Huntingdon broke in two and sank in ten minutes. The 3,748 GRT Greek cargo ship Papalemos rescued all 67 of her crew.

== See also ==
- SS Cambridge

== Bibliography ==
- Waters, Sydney D (1939). Clipper Ship to Motor Liner; the story of the New Zealand Shipping Company 1873–1939. London: The New Zealand Shipping Company Ltd.
