= List of shipwrecks in February 1940 =

The list of shipwrecks in February 1940 includes ships sunk, foundered, grounded, or otherwise lost during February 1940.

== 1 February ==
List of shipwrecks: 1 February 1940
Ship	State	Description
Ellen M.	United Kingdom	World War II: The coaster was torpedoed and sunk in the North Sea (52°33′N 2°15′E) by U-59 (Kriegsmarine) with the loss of all nine crew.
Fram	Sweden	World War II: The cargo ship was torpedoed and sunk in the North Sea off New Aberdour, Morayshire, United Kingdom (57°43′N 2°06′W) by U-13 (Kriegsmarine) with the loss of nine of her 23 crew. Survivors were rescued by HMS Khartoum and HMT Viking Deeps (both Royal Navy).
Picardie	France	The tanker struck a submerged object in the Atlantic Ocean 450 nautical miles (830 km) north west of the Azores, Portugal (39°00′N 39°30′W) and broke in two. The bow section sank. Seven crew and five gunners were lost. There were 28 survivors. The stern section was towed to Oran, Algeria in April 1940. Surviving wartime damage, it was sold to Norway in 1949, a new bow section was built and she returned to service as Sirefjell.

== 2 February ==
List of shipwrecks: 2 February 1940
Ship	State	Description
British Councillor	United Kingdom	World War II: Convoy AN 8442: The British Tanker Company steam tanker struck a mine and was damaged in the North Sea off Withernsea, Yorkshire (53°48′N 2°25′E). All 43 crew members were rescued by HMS Gallant, HMS Griffin and HMS Whitley. A tug was despatched to tow British Councillor into port, but she sank the next day.
Creofield	United Kingdom	World War II: The coastal tanker was torpedoed and sunk in the North Sea off Lowestoft, Suffolk (52°33′N 2°25′E) by U-59 (Kriegsmarine) with the loss of all seventeen crew.
Portelet	United Kingdom	World War II: The cargo ship was torpedoed and sunk in the North Sea off Great Yarmouth, Norfolk (52°40′N 2°13′E) by U-59 (Kriegsmarine) with the loss of two of her eleven crew. Survivors were rescued by a Finnish ship.
Teresa	Spain	The coaster ran aground at Azemmour, Spanish Morocco and was wrecked.

== 3 February ==
List of shipwrecks: 3 February 1940
Ship	State	Description
Armanistan	United Kingdom	World War II: Convoy OG 16: The cargo ship (6,805 GRT) was torpedoed and sunk off the mouth of the Tagus (38°15′N 11°15′W) by U-25 (Kriegsmarine). All 54 crew were rescued by Monte Abril (Spain).
Beechwood	United Kingdom	World War II: The cargo ship was attacked off the Norfolk coast] (3 nautical miles (5.6 km) east of the Smith's Knoll Lightship) by Luftwaffe aircraft. Beechwood was on a voyage from the River Tyne to Gibraltar. She became waterlogged and put in to the River Thames in a sinking condition. Subsequently repaired and returned to service.
Charles	Belgium	The cargo ship was driven ashore by bad weather in Saltwick Bay near Whitby, Yorkshire, United Kingdom (54°29′24″N 0°35′00″W) with the loss of six of her ten crew.
Pallas	Norway	The coaster collided in the North Sea off Haugesund, Rogaland with Wipunen (Finland) and sank. All seventeen people aboard were rescued by Wipunen.
Reet	Estonia	World War II: The coaster (815 GRT) was torpedoed and sunk in the North Sea east of the Orkney Islands, United Kingdom by U-58 (Kriegsmarine) with the loss of all eighteen crew.
HMS Sphinx	Royal Navy	World War II: The Halcyon-class minesweeper was bombed and damaged in the North Sea off Kinnaird Head, Aberdeenshire by Heinkel He 111 aircraft of Kampfgeschwader 26, Luftwaffe with the loss of 55 crew. She was taken in tow by HMS Speedwell (Royal Navy) but the tow parted. HMS Speedwell and HMS Harrier (Royal Navy) then attempted to take HMS Sphinx in tow but were unsuccessful. The survivors were rescued by HMS Boreas (Royal Navy). HMS Sphinx capsized the next day and drifted ashore. She was declared a total loss.
Tempo	Norway	World War II: The cargo ship was bombed and sunk in the North Sea off St Abb's Head, Berwickshire, United Kingdom 55°59′N 1°35′W by Heinkel He 111 aircraft of Kampfgeschwader 26, Luftwaffe. All fifteen crew left the ship safely in two lifeboats. The nine men in the first were rescued by the lifeboat Frank and William Oates ( Royal National Lifeboat Institution), but the other capsized in the breakers while trying to reach land at Berwick upon Tweed, Northumberland with the loss of five of the six men aboard.

== 4 February ==
List of shipwrecks: 4 February 1940
Ship	State	Description
Eminent	Belgium	The cargo ship ran aground on the east coast of the United Kingdom. All eleven crew were rescued by the lifeboat Augustus and Laura ( Royal National Lifeboat Institution). The ship was raised and resumed service, being lost in 1941.
Flores	Netherlands	The coaster ran aground in the Thames Estuary near the Kentish Knock Lightship ( Trinity House) and was wrecked. All seven crew were rescued, one of them after drifting three days.
Hop	Norway	World War II: The cargo ship was torpedoed and sunk in the North Sea (58°55′N 0°14′W) by U-37 (Kriegsmarine) with the loss of all seventeen crew.
Leo Dawson	United Kingdom	World War II: The cargo ship was torpedoed and sunk in the North Sea east of the Shetland Islands (60°10′N 0°39′W) by U-37 (Kriegsmarine) with the loss of all 35 crew.

== 5 February ==
List of shipwrecks: 5 February 1940
Ship	State	Description
Beaverburn	United Kingdom	World War II: Convoy OB 84: The cargo ship was torpedoed and sunk in the Atlantic Ocean south west of Cornwall (49°20′N 10°07′W) by U-41 (Kriegsmarine) with the loss of one of her 77 crew. Survivors were rescued by Narraganset (United States).
Ceronia	Netherlands	World War II: The tanker was torpedoed and damaged in the Atlantic Ocean south west of the Isles of Scilly, United Kingdom by German submarine U-41 (1939) (Kriegsmarine). Subsequently repaired and returned to service.
Karen	Denmark	The schooner was sunk in the North Sea off Methil, Fife, United Kingdom by an accidental engine explosion. Two crew were killed, seven survived.
U-41	Kriegsmarine	World War II: The Type IXA submarine was depth charged and sunk in the Atlantic Ocean (49°21′N 10°04′W) by HMS Antelope (Royal Navy) with the loss of all 49 crew.

== 6 February ==
List of shipwrecks: 6 February 1940
Ship	State	Description
Anu	Estonia	World War II: The cargo ship struck a mine off the mouth of the Tay and sank, killing the master, his wife and five crewmembers of the nineteen people on board.
Delfina	Spain	The cargo ship ran aground at the mouth of the Guadalquivir near Bonanza and was wrecked. Her crew were rescued.
Highcliffe	United Kingdom	The cargo ship ran aground on Forewick Holm, off Melby, Shetland Islands (60°19′08″N 1°39′35″W). All 35 crew survived. She was declared a constructive total loss.
Verbormilia	United Kingdom	The cargo ship ran aground at Fast Castle Point, Berwickshire (55°56′10″N 1°14′30″W) and was wrecked. All 32 people aboard were rescued by the lifeboats Annie Ronald and Isabella Forrest (both Royal National Lifeboat Institution).
Veteran	French Navy	The auxiliary minesweeper collided with Alert (United Kingdom) in the English Channel off Cap Griz Nez, Pas-de-Calais (58°50′20″N 1°43′54″E) and sank. Her crew were rescued.
Wirgo	Sweden	Winter War: The coaster was bombed by Soviet Air Force aircraft on 5 February when at anchor at Berghamn, Åland and was damaged by near misses. Damage seemed minor and she sailed during the night to Gärso where the crew went ashore. In the morning she suddenly heeled over to starboard and sank 20 minutes later. There were no casualties.
Zitella	United Kingdom	The cargo ship ran aground at Boddam, Aberdeenshire (57°28′15″N 1°46′30″W) and broke in two. All 33 crew were rescued by Coastguard life-saving apparatus. She was declared a total loss.

== 7 February ==
List of shipwrecks: 7 February 1940
Ship	State	Description
Eldonpark	United Kingdom	The cargo ship ran aground and was wrecked near Port Eynon, Glamorgan. Her 37 crew were rescued by the Mumbles Lifeboat.
Munster	United Kingdom	World War II: The ferry struck a mine and sank in Liverpool Bay (53°56′N 3°24′W). All 235 people aboard were rescued by Ringwall (United Kingdom).
Poling Brothers No. 2	United States	The tanker sank without loss of life in 65 feet (20 m) of water in Long Island Sound north of Glen Cove, Long Island, New York, and 1.5 nautical miles (2.8 km; 1.7 mi) south of Great Captain Island off Greenwich, Connecticut, at 40°57.350′N 073°37.500′W after striking pack ice.

== 9 February ==
List of shipwrecks: 9 February 1940
Ship	State	Description
Agnes Allen	United Kingdom	World War II: The fishing trawler struck a mine and sank in the Irish Sea. She was on a voyage from Holyhead, Anglesey to Workington, Cumberland. Six crew were killed.
Chagres	United Kingdom	World War II: The refrigerated cargo ship struck a mine and sank in the Irish Sea off Liverpool, Lancashire with the loss of two of her 64 crew. Survivors were rescued by HMT Loch Montreith (Royal Navy).
Chaumoise	France	The motorboat struck rocks off Les Sables d'Olonne, Vendée and was wrecked. Hwe crew were rescued.
HMT Fort Royal	Royal Navy	World War II: The 100.4-foot (30.6 m), 351-ton naval trawler was strafed, bombed and sunk in the North Sea north east of Aberdeen by two Heinkel He 111 aircraft of Kampfgeschwader 26, Luftwaffe with the loss of six crew including her Captain. Survivors were rescued by HMT Ohm and HMT Thomas Altoft (both Royal Navy).
HMT Robert Bowen	Royal Navy	World War II: The Castle-class trawler was strafed, bombed, blown in half and sunk in the North Sea 20 nautical miles (37 km) north east of Aberdeen (57°09′N 02°00′W)by two Heinkel He 111 aircraft of Kampfgeschwader 26, Luftwaffe with the loss of all sixteen crew.

== 10 February ==
List of shipwrecks: 10 February 1940
Ship	State	Description
Branksea	United Kingdom	The cargo ship sank in the North Sea off Montrose, Angus. At the time she was being towed by the tug Prizeman (United Kingdom) to Scapa Flow to be used as a blockship. The mate of the tug was lost attempting to free the tow.
Burgerdijk	Netherlands	World War II: The cargo ship was torpedoed and sunk in the Atlantic Ocean 15 nautical miles (28 km) off Bishop Rock, Cornwall, United Kingdom 49°45′N 6°30′W) by U-48 (Kriegsmarine). All 48 people on board were rescued by Edam (Netherlands).
Charles-Marguerite	France	The fishing boat struck rocks off Île d'Yeu, Vendée and was wrecked. All five crew members were lost.
Sea Rambler	United Kingdom	The cargo ship foundered in a storm in the Atlantic Ocean north west of the Azores, Portugal (47°16′N 41°18′W). The 25 crew members were rescued in difficult conditions by Mosdale and Kaia Knudsen (both Norway).
Silja	Norway	World War II: The cargo ship was torpedoed and sunk in the Atlantic Ocean south west of Ireland (51°21′N 11°32′W) by U-37 (Kriegsmarine) with the loss of all fifteen crew.
Theresa Boyle	United Kingdom	World War II: The 120.7-foot (36.8 m), 224-ton steam fishing trawler was strafed and damaged by bombs and causing her to sink from leaks in the North Sea 115 nautical miles (213 km) east by north of Aberdeen by an Heinkel He 111 aircraft of Kampfgeschwader 26, Luftwaffe. All ten crew were rescued by HMT Almandine and HMT Brabant (both Royal Navy) 50 hours later.

== 11 February ==
List of shipwrecks: 11 February 1940
Ship	State	Description
Aghia Zoni P.	Greece	The cargo ship ran aground near Kyparissia. She was raised in April but was declared a total loss.
Erna	(United Kingdom) Australia	The launch burned after an engine explosion off Shark Island in Sydney Harbour. All six occupants were rescued.
Imperial Transport	United Kingdom	The stern section of Imperial Transport beached in Kilchattan Bay. World War II: The tanker was torpedoed and damaged in the Atlantic Ocean north west of the Outer Hebrides (approximately 59°N 12°W) by U-53 (Kriegsmarine). Two crew were killed. Imperial Transport broke in two. The bow section sank. The stern section was taken in tow by the tugs Englishman and St Martin (both United Kingdom) and beached at Kilchattan Bay, Bute on 26 February. A new bow section was constructed and the ship was repaired and re-entered service in 1941.
Linda	Estonia	World War II: The cargo ship was torpedoed and sunk in the North Sea 100 nautical miles (190 km) west of Utsira, Norway (58°15′N 1°54′E) by U-9 (Kriegsmarine) with the loss of one of her fifteen crew. Survivors were rescued by Birgitta (Sweden).
Orania	Sweden	World War II: The cargo ship was torpedoed and sunk in the North Sea 60 nautical miles (110 km) north east of the Shetland Islands United Kingdom by U-50 (Kriegsmarine) with the loss of fourteen of the 24 people aboard. Survivors were rescued by HMS Fearless (Royal Navy).
Philip Godby	United Kingdom	World War II: The 125.6-foot (38.3 m), 209-ton steam trawler, a sold off Castle-class naval trawler, was shelled and sunk by U-37 (Kriegsmarine) 70 miles (110 km) west of Fastnet (50°40′N 11°02′W). The crew was rescued from her boats by Monte Navajo (Spain) 28 hours later.
Snestad	Norway	World War II: The cargo ship was torpedoed and sunk in the Atlantic Ocean west of the Hebrides, United Kingdom 58°40′N 13°40′W) by U-53 (Kriegsmarine). All 36 crew were rescued by Albert L. Ellsworth (Norway), but two of them died when that ship was damaged by a torpedo from U-50 two days later.
Togimo	United Kingdom	World War II: The trawler was shelled and sunk in the Atlantic Ocean west of Cornwall (50°40′N 11°02′W) by U-37 (Kriegsmarine) with the loss of one of her eleven crew. Survivors were rescued by Monte Navajo (Spain).

== 12 February ==
List of shipwrecks: 12 February 1940
Ship	State	Description
Dalarö	Sweden	World War II: The cargo ship was torpedoed and sunk in the Atlantic Ocean north west of Ireland (56°44′N 11°44′W) by U-53 (Kriegsmarine) with the loss of one of her 30 crew. Survivors were rescued by the fishing trawler Jan de Waele (Belgium).
Doris Hamlin	United States	The schooner disappeared in the Atlantic Ocean with the loss of all ten crew. She was carrying coal from Hampton Roads, Virginia to the Canary Islands.
Flandres	Belgium	The cargo ship collided with Kabalo (Belgium) in The Downs (51°12′51″N 1°27′41″E) and sank. Her crew survived.
Nidarholm	Norway	World War II: The cargo ship was torpedoed, shelled and sunk in the Atlantic Ocean (50°50′N 14°10′W) by U-26 (Kriegsmarine) The ship was split in two, with the bow section sinking that day and the stern section sometime afterwards. All 25 crew were rescued by Berto (Norway).
Ons Heer Bewaar Ons	Belgium	The fishing trawler sank in the North Sea after hitting a submerged object. Her crew were saved by another trawler.
U-33	Kriegsmarine	World War II: The Type VIIA submarine (616/733 t, 1936) was depth charged and sunk in the Firth of Clyde by HMS Gleaner (Royal Navy) with the loss of 25 of her 42 crew.
Vierge de Boulogne	France	The fishing trawler ran aground near Omonville-la-Rogue, Manche (49°43′N 01°51′W) and was wrecked. All 21 crew were rescued by the local lifeboat.

== 13 February ==
List of shipwrecks: 13 February 1940
Ship	State	Description
British Triumph	United Kingdom	World War II: Convoy FS 93: The tanker struck a mine and was damaged in the North Sea off Cromer, Norfolk (53°06′N 1°25′E) with the loss of four of her 47 crew. Survivors were rescued by British Officer (United Kingdom) and HMS Stork (Royal Navy). British Officer attempted to tow British Triumph. The tug Irishman (United Kingdom) was sent out, but British Triumph sank before she arrived.
Chastine Mærsk	Denmark	World War II: The cargo ship was torpedoed and sunk in the North Sea 70 nautical miles (130 km) west of Norway (61°30′N 2°00′E) by U-25 (Kriegsmarine). All 30 crew were rescued by Hilda (Norway).
Norna	Sweden	World War II: The cargo ship was torpedoed and sunk in the Atlantic Ocean (55°30′N 11°00′W) by U-53 (Kriegsmarine) with the loss of all eighteen crew.
Wakama	Germany	World War II: The cargo ship was intercepted in the Atlantic Ocean off Cape Frio, Brazil (22°42′S 41°38′W) by HMS Dorsetshire (Royal Navy) and was scuttled by her crew. Her 46 crew were rescued by HMS Dorsetshire.

== 14 February ==
List of shipwrecks: 14 February 1940
Ship	State	Description
Alizé	France	The fishing sloop sank off Brest, Finistère, after a collision with the submarine Archimède (French Navy). All five crew were killed.
Giorgio Ohlsen	Italy	World War II: The cargo ship (5,694 GRT) struck a mine and sank in the North Sea off Cromer, England (53°17′N 1°10′E) with the loss of sixteen of her 33 crew. Survivors were rescued by Lolworth and Chatwood (both United Kingdom).
Glendun	United Kingdom	The cargo ship ran aground at Cornaa, Isle of Man and was wrecked. All ten crew members were rescued by the lifeboat Lady Harrison ( Royal National Lifeboat Institution).
Gretafield	United Kingdom	World War II: Convoy HX 18: The tanker straggled behind the convoy. She was torpedoed and set on fire in the North Sea south east of Noss Head, Shetland Islands (58°27′N 2°33′W) by U-57 (Kriegsmarine) with the loss of ten crew members and one gunner. Thirty survivors were rescued by HMT Peggy Nutten and HMT Strathalladale (both Royal Navy). The burning wreck came ashore at Dunbeath, Caithness on 15 February and broke in two four days later. She was declared a total loss.
Langleeford	United Kingdom	World War II: Convoy HX 18: The cargo ship straggled behind the convoy. She was torpedoed and sunk in the Atlantic Ocean 70 nautical miles (130 km) north west of the Fastnet Rock (51°40′N 12°40′W), by U-26 (Kriegsmarine) with the loss of four of her 34 crew.
Martin Goldschmidt	Denmark	World War II: The cargo ship was torpedoed and sunk in the Atlantic Ocean north west of Ireland (55°53′N 12°37′W) by U-53 (Kriegsmarine) with the loss of fifteen of her twenty crew. The survivors were rescued by Berto (Norway).
Sultan Star	United Kingdom	World War II: The cargo liner was torpedoed and sunk in the Atlantic Ocean approximately 200 nautical miles (370 km) south west of Land's End, Cornwall (48°54′N 10°03′W) by U-48 (Kriegsmarine) with the loss of one of her 73 crew. Survivors were rescued by HMS Whitshed (Royal Navy).

== 15 February ==
List of shipwrecks: 15 February 1940
Ship	State	Description
Aase	Denmark	World War II: The cargo ship was torpedoed and sunk in the Atlantic Ocean south west of Cornwall, United Kingdom (49°17′N 8°15′W) by U-37 (Kriegsmarine) with the loss of fifteen of her sixteen crew. The survivor was rescued on 17 February by HMS Verity (Royal Navy).
Den Haag	Netherlands	World War II: The tanker was torpedoed and sunk in the Bay of Biscay (48°02′N 8°26′W) by U-48 (Kriegsmarine) with the loss of 26 of her 39 crew. Survivors were rescued by Glenorchy (United Kingdom).
Maryland	Denmark	World War II: The cargo ship was torpedoed and sunk in the Atlantic Ocean west of the Hebrides, United Kingdom (57°09′N 12°00′W) by U-50 (Kriegsmarine) with the loss of all 34 crew.
Rhone	Denmark	World War II: The cargo ship was torpedoed and sunk in the North Sea east of Caithness, United Kingdom, by U-14 (Kriegsmarine) with the loss of nine of her twenty crew. Survivors were rescued by HMS Kipling (Royal Navy) and the fishing trawler Standard (Sweden).
Sleipner	Denmark	World War II: The cargo ship was torpedoed and sunk in the Moray Firth (58°18′N 1°48′W) by U-14 (Kriegsmarine) with the loss of thirteen of her 41 crew. Survivors were rescued by HMS Kipling (Royal Navy) and the fishing trawler Standard (Sweden).
Steinstad	Norway	World War II: The cargo ship was torpedoed and sunk in the Atlantic Ocean 50 nautical miles (93 km)west of County Clare, Ireland by U-26 (Kriegsmarine) with the loss of thirteen of her 24 crew.
USS Wicomico	United States Navy	The tug collided with USS Goff (United States Navy) in the Hampton Roads, Virginia and sank. The damaged destroyer rescued her eleven crew. The wreck was later raised and scrapped.

== 16 February ==
List of shipwrecks: 16 February 1940
Ship	State	Description
Altmark	Kriegsmarine	World War II: Altmark Incident: The tanker ran aground in the Jøssingfjorden in Norway trying to evade HMS Cossack (Royal Navy). British sailors boarded the ship and liberated the 299 British merchant sailors held aboard after a fight during which 7 German sailors were killed and eleven were wounded. Altmark was later refloated. She was repaired and returned to service as Uckermark.
Baldur	Germany	World War II: Altmark Incident: The cargo ship was intercepted west of Jøssingfjord by HMS Ivanhoe (Royal Navy) and was scuttled by her crew.
Liana	Sweden	World War II: The cargo ship was torpedoed and sunk in the North Sea 20 nautical miles (37 km) north of Kinnaird Head, Aberdeenshire, United Kingdom by U-14 (Kriegsmarine) with the loss of ten of her twenty crew. Survivors were rescued by the fishing trawler Loch Hope (United Kingdom) and the cargo ship Santos (Sweden).
Osmed	Sweden	World War II: The cargo ship was torpedoed and sunk in the North Sea 20 nautical miles (37 km) north of Kinnaird Head, Aberdeenshire, United Kingdom by U-14 (Kriegsmarine) with the loss of thirteen of her twenty crew. Survivors were rescued by the trawler Loch Hope (United Kingdom).

== 17 February ==
List of shipwrecks: 17 February 1940
Ship	State	Description
Alkmaar	Netherlands	The cargo ship ran aground on Ilhéu de Cima, Cape Verde Islands and was wrecked. Her crew was rescued by a Portuguese warship.
Baron Ailsa	United Kingdom	World War II: The cargo ship struck a mine and sank in the North Sea north of Inverness-shire (53°17′N 1°12′E) with the loss of two of her 36 crew. Survivors were rescued by HMT Beech (Royal Navy).
Cheldale	United Kingdom	The cargo ship collided with Greystoke Castle (United Kingdom) in the Indian Ocean 24 nautical miles (44 km) off Durban, South Africa (29°49′S 31°30′E) with the loss of sixteen of her 35 crew.
Kvernaas	Norway	World War II: The cargo ship was torpedoed and sunk in the North Sea 4 nautical miles (7.4 km) north west of the Schouwenbank, Netherlands (51°50′N 3°19′E) by U-10 (Kriegsmarine). All twenty crew were rescued by Oranjepolder (Netherlands).
Pyrrhus	United Kingdom	World War II: Convoy OG 18: The cargo liner straggled behind the convoy. She was torpedoed and damaged in the Atlantic Ocean north of Cape Finisterre (44°02′N 10°18′W) by U-37 (Kriegsmarine) with the loss of eight of her 86 crew. The ship broke in two, with the stern section sinking. The bow section sank two days later. Survivors were rescued by Sinnington Court and Uskside (both United Kingdom).
Wilja	Finland	World War II: The cargo ship was torpedoed and sunk in the Atlantic Ocean south west of the Isles of Scilly, United Kingdom (49°00′N 6°33′W) by U-48 (Kriegsmarine). All 27 crew were rescued by Maasdam (Netherlands) and HMS Vanessa (Royal Navy).

== 18 February ==
List of shipwrecks: 18 February 1940
Ship	State	Description
Ameland	Netherlands	World War II: The cargo ship was torpedoed and sunk in the North Sea off the Maasbank Buoy (51°54′N 3°01′E) by U-10 (Kriegsmarine). All 48 crew were rescued by Montferland (Netherlands).
Banderas	Spain	World War II: The cargo ship was torpedoed and sunk in the Atlantic Ocean 8 nautical miles (15 km) north west of Cape Villano by U-53 (Kriegsmarine) with the loss of 22 of her 29 crew. Survivors were rescued by the fishing vessel Tritonia (Spain).
Bore III	Finland	Winter War: The cargo ship was bombed and sunk off Mäntyluoto by Soviet Air Force aircraft.
Bore IV	Finland	Winter War: The cargo ship was bombed and sunk off Mäntyluoto by Soviet Air Force aircraft.
HMS Daring	Royal Navy	World War II: Convoy HN 12: The D-class destroyer was torpedoed and sunk in the North Sea off Duncansby Head, Caithness (58°40′N 1°35′W) by U-23 (Kriegsmarine) with the loss of 156 of her 161 crew.
Ellin	Greece	World War II: The cargo ship was torpedoed and sunk in the Atlantic Ocean 25 nautical miles (46 km) north west of Cape Finisterre, Spain by U-37 (Kriegsmarine). Her crew were rescued by the fishing boat Manin (Spain) and landed at Á Coruña.
El Sonador	Panama	World War II: The cargo ship was torpedoed and sunk in the North Sea east of the Shetland Islands, United Kingdom by U-61 (Kriegsmarine) with the loss of all seventeen crew.
Ilsenstein	United Kingdom	World War II: The cargo ship was scuttled as a blockship in Skerry Sound, Scapa Flow, Orkney Islands.
PLM 15	France	World War II: Convoy RS 10: The cargo ship was torpedoed and sunk in the Atlantic Ocean off Cape Finisterre (43°37′N 9°15′W) by U-37 (Kriegsmarine)with the loss of all 42 crew.
Rigel	Finland	Winter War: The cargo ship was bombed and sunk off Mäntyluoto by Soviet Air Force aircraft.
Sangstad	Norway	World War II: The cargo ship was torpedoed and sunk in the North Sea east of Kirkwall, Orkney Islands, United Kingdom (59°03′N 1°08′E) by U-61 (Kriegsmarine) with the loss of one of her 29 crew. Survivors were rescued by HMS Brazen and HMS Diana (both Royal Navy).

== 19 February ==
List of shipwrecks: 19 February 1940
Ship	State	Description
Busk	United Kingdom	World War II: The Admiralty-requisitioned cargo ship was scuttled as a blockship in Kirk Sound, Scapa Flow. She broke up in a gale in the winter of 1940–41 and was scrapped.
Fox	United Kingdom	The motorboat sank in the Solent after a collision with the paddle steamer Lord Elgin (United Kingdom). Her three crew were rescued.
Shch-421	Soviet Navy	The Shchuka-class submarine ran aground in Skorbeevskaya Bay. She was refloated on 6 March and taken in to Polyarny for repairs.
Tiberton	United Kingdom	World War II: The cargo ship was torpedoed and sunk in the Moray Firth (58°07′N 2°39′W) by U-23 (Kriegsmarine) with the loss of all 34 crew.

== 20 February ==
List of shipwrecks: 20 February 1940
Ship	State	Description
HMT Fifeshire	Royal Navy	World War II: The naval trawler was bombed and sunk in the North Sea (59°00′N 0°25′E) by Heinkel He 111 aircraft of Kampfgeschwader 26, Luftwaffe with the loss of twenty of her 21 crew.

== 21 February ==
List of shipwrecks: 21 February 1940
Ship	State	Description
Georgios Karavias	Greece	The coaster disappeared in a storm in the Aegean Sea between Creta and Piraeus with the loss of all thirteen hands.
Loch Maddy	United Kingdom	World War II: Convoy HX 19: The cargo ship straggled behind the convoy. She was torpedoed and damaged in the North Sea east of the Orkney Islands (58°50′N 2°28′W) by U-57 (Kriegsmarine). She was taken in tow but was torpedoed and sunk the next day by U-23 (Kriegsmarine) and broke in two. Four of her crew were killed. Thirty-three survivors were rescued by HMS Diana (Royal Navy). The bow section sank, whilst the stern section was beached in Inganess Bay, Orkney Islands for the salvage of her cargo of aircraft, timber and wheat. She was declared a total loss.
Petten	Netherlands	World War II: The fishing trawler was damaged in the North Sea by an explosion, possibly due to a British mine, and sank under tow before reaching a coast. All twelve crew were rescued by the fishing vessel Vikingbank (Netherlands).
Tara	Netherlands	World War II: The cargo ship was torpedoed and sunk in the Atlantic Ocean west of Cape Finisterre, Spain (42°45′N 10°25′W) by U-50 (Kriegsmarine). All 35 crew were rescued by Le Fantasque (Marine Nationale) and the fishing trawler Milin (Spain).

== 22 February ==
List of shipwrecks: 22 February 1940
Ship	State	Description
British Endeavour	United Kingdom	World War II: Convoy OGF 19: The tanker was torpedoed and sunk in the Atlantic Ocean north west of Cape Finisterre, Spain (42°11′N 11°35′W) by U-50 (Kriegsmarine) with the loss of five of her 38 crew. Survivors were rescued by Bodnant (United Kingdom).
Z1 Leberecht Maass	Kriegsmarine	World War II: Operation Wikinger: The Type 1934-class destroyer was bombed and damaged by a Heinkel He 111 aircraft of X Fliegerkorps, Luftwaffe. She strayed into a minefield in the Dogger Bank, struck a mine and sank with the loss of 282 of her 342 crew. Survivors were rescued by Z13 Erich Koellner, Z16 Friedrich Eckoldt and Z4 Richard Beitzen (all Kriegsmarine).
Z3 Max Schultz	Kriegsmarine	World War II: Operation Wikinger: The Type 1934-class destroyer struck a mine in the Dogger Bank whilst attempting to rescue survivors from Leberecht Maass and sank with the loss of all 308 crew.

== 23 February ==
List of shipwrecks: 23 February 1940
Ship	State	Description
Benvolio	Royal Navy	World War II: The naval trawler (352 GRT) struck a mine and sank off the mouth of the Humber with the loss of ten of her fifteen crew.
Steur	Belgium	World War II: The fishing trawler (61 GRT) struck a mine in the North Sea 10 nautical miles (19 km) north west of the West Hinder Lightship ( Trinity House) and sank with the loss of all four hands.
Torbrand	Norway	The cargo ship (308 GRT) ran aground at Skudenes and was wrecked. There were no casualties.
U-53	Kriegsmarine	World War II: The Type VIIB submarine (1,040 GRT) was depth charged and sunk in the North Sea off the Orkney Islands, United Kingdom (60°32′N 6°14′W) by HMS Gurkha (Royal Navy) with the loss of all 42 crew.

== 24 February ==
List of shipwrecks: 24 February 1940
Ship	State	Description
Clan Morrison	United Kingdom	World War II: Convoy FN 102: The cargo ship struck a mine in the North Sea north of Cromer Norfolk (53°07′N 1°22′E) and sank with the loss of one of her 32 crew. Survivors were rescued by HMT Nogi (Royal Navy).
Ejjam	Denmark	World War II: The fishing boat was rammed and sunk off the Dogger Bank, North Sea by M-1 (Kriegsmarine). The German ship deliberately avoided rescuing her crew. All four crewmen died.
Gerlis	Denmark	World War II: The fishing boat was rammed and sunk off the Dogger Bank by M-1 (Kriegsmarine). The German ship deliberately avoided rescuing her crew. All four crewmen died.
Golconda	United Kingdom	The cargo ship ran aground near Chittagong, India and was wrecked.
Jevington Court	United Kingdom	World War II: Convoy FS 103: The cargo ship struck a mine and sank in the North Sea 8 1/4 nautical miles (15.3 km) off the Cromer Knoll Lightship ( Trinity House). All 35 crew were rescued by Dunoon (Royal Navy).
Merkator	Denmark	World War II: The fishing boat was rammed and sunk off the Dogger Bank by M-1 (Kriegsmarine). The German ship deliberately avoided rescuing her crew. All four crewmen died.
Polaris	Denmark	World War II: The fishing boat was rammed and sunk off the Dogger Bank by M-1 (Kriegsmarine). The German ship deliberately avoided rescuing her crew. All four crewmen died.
Royal Archer	United Kingdom	World War II: The cargo ship struck a mine in the Firth of Forth (56°06′N 2°55′W) and sank. All 27 crew were rescued by HMS Weston (Royal Navy).
Santos	Sweden	World War II: Convoy HN 14: The cargo ship was torpedoed and sunk in the North Sea off Kirkwall, Orkney Islands, United Kingdom, (59°17′N 0°42′W) by U-63 (Kriegsmarine) with the loss of 31 of the 43 people on board, which included survivors from Liana (Italy), nine of them being killed. Survivors were rescued by HMS Gallant (Royal Navy) and landed at Invergordon, Ross-shire.

== 25 February ==
List of shipwrecks: 25 February 1940
Ship	State	Description
Castlemoor	United Kingdom	World War II: Convoy HX 20: The cargo ship was last seen in the Atlantic Ocean 800 nautical miles (1,500 km) west of Ouessant, Finistère, France. No further trace, presumed foundered with the loss of all 41 crew.
U-63	Kriegsmarine	World War II: The Type IIC submarine was depth charged, torpedoed and sunk in the North Sea south of the Shetland Islands, United Kingdom (58°35′N 1°05′W) by HMS Escort, HMS Inglefield, and HMS Imogen (both Royal Navy) with the loss of one of her 25 crew. Survivors were rescued by HMS Inglefield and HMS Imogen.

== 26 February ==
List of shipwrecks: 26 February 1940
Ship	State	Description
Efos	United Kingdom	The cargo ship collided with some flotsam in the North Sea and sank. All nineteen crew were rescued.
Ida	Netherlands	The coaster sank in the Irish Sea 30 nautical miles (56 km) south south west of the Smalls Lighthouse, Pembrokeshire, United Kingdom. There were no casualties.
Nordia	Sweden	World War II: Convoy ON 15: The cargo ship collided with HMS Imperial (Royal Navy) (61°12′N 3°08′E) and sank in the North Sea with the loss of two of her crew.
Orizaba	Germany	World War II: The blockade runner ran aground off Skjervøya, Norway (70°40′N 20°59′E) and was wrecked. Her crew were rescued by Margareta (Finland).

== 27 February ==
List of shipwrecks: 27 February 1940
Ship	State	Description
Ben Attow	United Kingdom	World War II: The fishing trawler exploded and sank off the coast of Fife with the loss of all nine crew. She was sunk either by a mine or a Heinkel He 111 aircraft of Kampfgeschwader 26, Luftwaffe.
Orion	Estonia	The coaster sprang a leak and sank in the North Sea east of the Shetland Islands, United Kingdom. All sixteen crew were rescued by the fishing trawler Avonside (United Kingdom).
PLM 25	France	World War II: Convoy FS 106: The collier struck a mine and was damaged in the North Sea (53°19′N 1°12′E). She was taken in tow by HMS Flamingo (Royal Navy) but struck another mine and sank with the loss of four of her 43 crew. Survivors were rescued by HMS Wallace (Royal Navy).
Storfors	Sweden	The cargo ship collided with HMS Jackal (Royal Navy) and sank in the North Sea 12.8 nautical miles (23.7 km) off the Longstone Lighthouse, Northumberland, United Kingdom. All fourteen crew were rescued by HMS Jackal.

== 28 February ==
List of shipwrecks: 28 February 1940
Ship	State	Description
Ulster Queen	United Kingdom	The passenger ship ran aground off Ramsey, Isle of Man. All on board, including 88 passengers, were rescued. She was abandoned, but was refloated on 27 March. Subsequently repaired and returned to service.

== 29 February ==
List of shipwrecks: 29 February 1940
Ship	State	Description
Maria Rosa	Italy	World War II: The cargo ship (4,211 GRT) was torpedoed and sunk in the North Sea south east of Great Yarmouth, Norfolk, United Kingdom (52°24′30″N 1°59′00″E) by U-20 (Kriegsmarine) with the loss of twelve of her 29 crew.

== Unknown date ==
List of shipwrecks: Unknown Date 1940
Ship	State	Description
K R Co. #1	United States	The scow sank in Nazil Bay (52°12′N 174°06′W) on the coast of Atka Island in the Aleutian Islands, Territory of Alaska.
U-54	Kriegsmarine	World War II: The Type VIIB submarine departed from Wilhelmshaven, on her first patrol. No further trace. Presumed to have struck a mine in the Skagerrak (55°07′N 5°05′E) on or about 13 February with the loss of all 41 crew.
