= Operation Nordmark =

1940 naval sortie

Operation Northern March / Unternehmen Nordmark
- Part of the Phoney War of the Second World War
- Map of the North Sea
- Location: North Sea
- Planned by: Marinegruppe West
- Commanded by: Wilhelm Marschall; Alfred Saalwächter
- Objective: Attack British merchant shipping
- Date: 18 February 1940
- Outcome: Inconclusive
- Casualties: Nil; Nil killed Nil injured

Operation Northern Mark (Unternehmen Nordmark) was a sortie by a German flotilla of two battleships and a heavy cruiser against British merchant shipping between Norway and Shetland from 18 to 20 February 1940. The sortie was intended as a riposte to the Altmark incident, to create confusion to help German blockade-runners reach home and as a prelude to more ambitious operations in the Atlantic. The flotilla was spotted by the British early on, who held back a Norway-bound convoy.

Battleships of the Home Fleet were sent towards the North Sea to intercept the German ships. The German flotilla found only neutral ships and concluded that they had been found out; British submarine sightings of the flotilla came to nothing amidst stormy weather and confusion over conflicting reports from the submarines. The flotilla returned to base during the afternoon of 20 February; concurrent German U-boat patrols sank several ships, including a destroyer.

== Background ==
After the British search for the heavy cruiser Admiral Graf Spee ended with its destruction, many ships returned to the Home Fleet but the German naval war staff (Seekriegsleitung) decided that fleet operations were more feasible. The commander of Naval Group West (Marinegruppe West (Generaladmiral Alfred Saalwächter) was ordered to conduct more operations with the Scharnhorst-class battleships Scharnhorst and Gneisenau and the heavy cruiser Admiral Hipper. Admiral Wilhelm Marschall was criticised for returning to port after sinking the armed merchant cruiser HMS Rawalpindi in November 1939. Attacks were to be made on ships exporting goods from Norway and by disrupting convoys in the Atlantic.

Marinegruppe West took the view that engine problems in Scharnhorst and Gneisenau made Atlantic operations too risky and wanted to attack convoys between Bergen and Shetland. Marinegruppe West wanted to conduct U-boat operations against units of the Home Fleet during another battleship sortie and postponed sailing several times as the icy conditions of the winter of 1939–1940 kept U-boats in port. No intelligence about another Allied convoy sailing had been received and then Gneisenau was damaged by ice. An operation would also cover the return of the oil tanker Altmark to Germany, since the Germans did not know at the time the tanker was beached. Seven U-boats were sent to the northern North Sea to reconnoitre for the German fleet and attack British shipping.

== Prelude ==
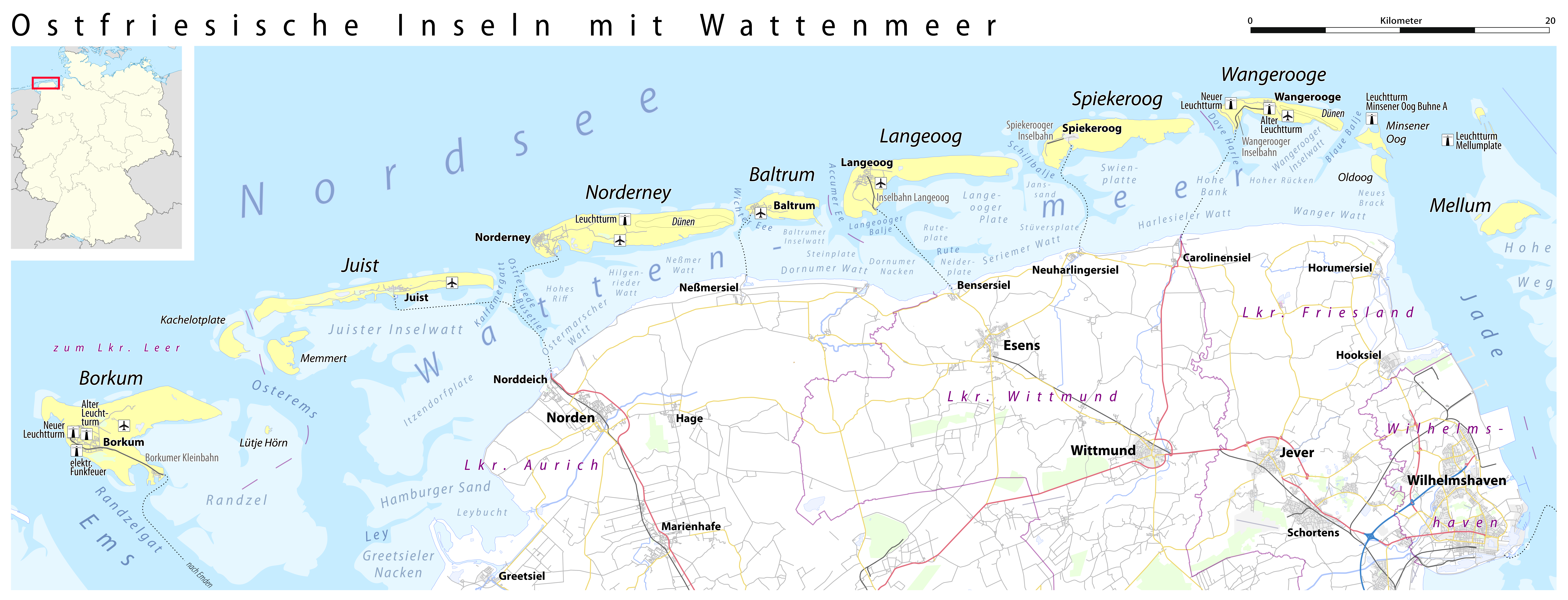
Map of Wangerooge (top right) in the East Frisian Islands

On 17 February, the Germans detected a British convoy sailing northwards up the east coast of Britain; another convoy was thought to be nearby and the German operation was ordered for 18 February. Marschall decided that if the German ships were spotted as they left port, he would turn back as soon as it was dark. Because of the weather, Marschall moved the ships from Wilhelmshaven into the Wangerooge Channel on the evening of 17 February and during the early morning of 18 February, the British received reports from Bomber Command aircraft that ships appeared to be iced-in near their bases. Patrolling British submarines were redirected as Marschall sailed with Scharnhorst, Gneisenau, Admiral Hipper and the destroyers Z20 Karl Galster and Z21 Wilhelm Heidkamp into the North Sea for Bergen in Norway.

== Sortie ==
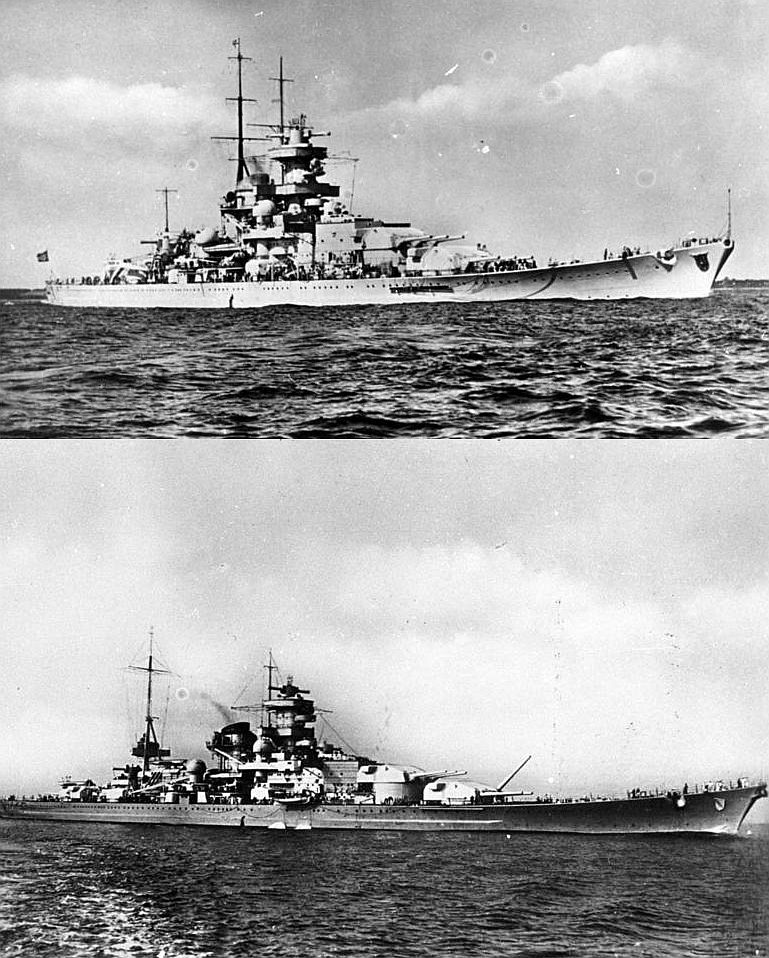
The battleships Gneisenau and Scharnhorst

The destroyers Z1 Leberecht Maass, Z5 Paul Jacobi, Z6 Theodor Riedel and Z7 Hermann Schoemann together with torpedo boats Seeadler and Luchs screened the German ships as they sailed into the North Sea at 11:00 a.m. but were then sent to the Skagerrak. The destroyer Z9 Wolfgang Zenker was forced to turn back after suffering damage from ice. With the two remaining destroyers, Marschall headed to 61°N 00°E and sent seaplanes to reconnoitre up to Statlandet further north; no contacts were reported, none being found by other aircraft from Germany either. German signals intelligence was unaware that on 19 February that there was only one eastbound convoy, which had been held back or that the Home Fleet was at sea.

Convoy HN 12 was close to Scotland and the reciprocal ON convoy was sent to Scapa Flow until the scare subsided. (Note: HN, Homeward Norway convoys, sailed from Bergen to Methil from November 1939 to 1940; the reciprocal convoys were coded ON, Outbound Norway.) Ships of the Home Fleet were already at sea covering the attack on Altmark and reinforcements of battleships were ordered from the River Clyde to join them. In poor weather, the submarine HMS Salmon sent a sighting report that Scharnhorst, Gneisenau, Hipper and Königsberg were heading south at high speed. The SKL wanted Marschall to wait for another day between Shetland and Bergen and agreed with Marinegruppe West to mount an attack on the ships near Shetland but did not interfere with the operation, rather, Marinegruppe West tried to influence Marschall by sending frequent reports of British activity,

Wireless traffic remains normal. No recognisable effect of operation. Heavy enemy forces expected near Clyde and in North Channel. Further stay in operations area on 20 February probably not dangerous with prospects of success.

SKL was against the suggestion but did not intervene; lack of sightings by 3:00 p.m. on 19 February led Marschall to believe that the British had found out about the operation and had suspended convoy sailings; waiting would be pointless and Marschall ordered the ships home. The submarine L23 signalled that a cruiser and two destroyers were heading south-east, which caused much confusion at the Admiralty. Both British submarines were detected and had to submerge deeply to escape, precluding the pursuit of the German ships, then they turned back before reaching U-boat patrol areas. The German ships reached Wilhelmshaven on 20 February as the Home Fleet ships arrived in the North Sea and the Norway-bound ON convoy sailed.

=== U-boats ===
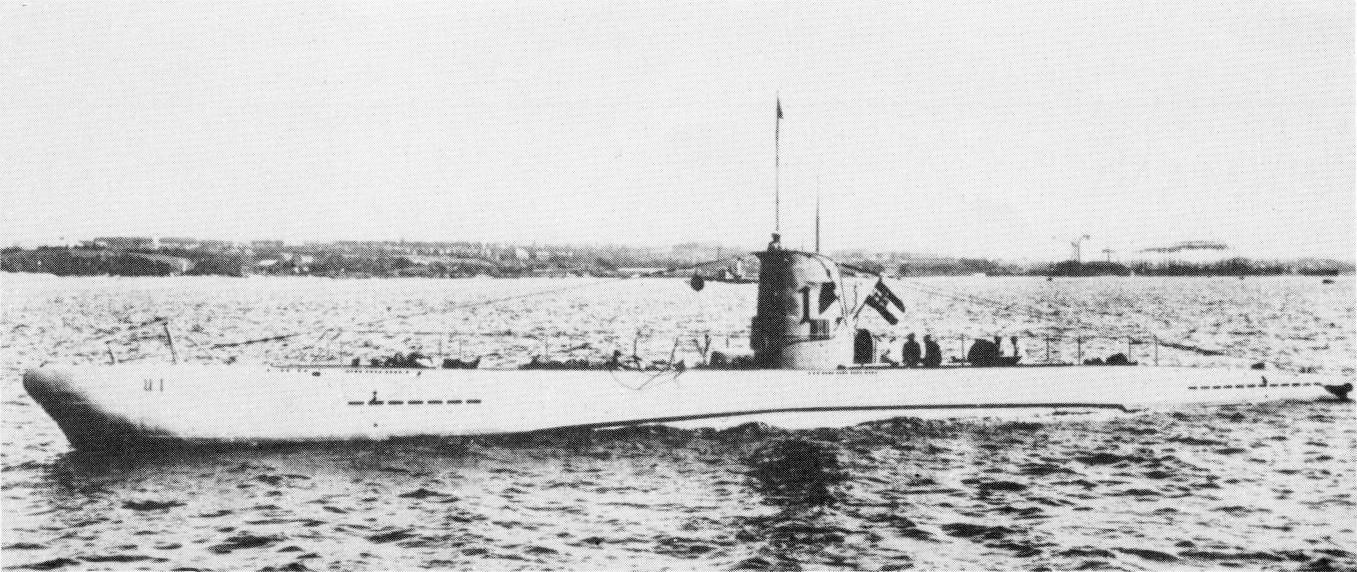
U-1 a typical type IIB U-boat

The type IIB U-boat U-9 sank a ship of 1,213 gross register tons (GRT) on 11 February off Norway, U-10 sank two ships of a total of 6,356 GRT and U-14 sank four ships of a total of 5,320 GRT on 15 and 16 February off the Scottish coast. On 21 February U-57 sank a 10,191 GRT ship and damaged a 4,966 GRT straggler east of the Orkney Islands. U-23 sank the destroyer HMS Daring which was escorting the west-bound Convoy HN 12 on 18 February, sank a ship on 19 February and on 22 February finished off the 4,966 GRT ship damaged by U-57. U-61 sank two ships of a total of 5,703 GRT east of the Shetland Islands and the Orkney Islands on 18 February and U-63 sank a 4,211 GRT ship off Kirkwall, Orkney, on 24 February 1940.

== Aftermath ==
SKL was dismayed by the abortive nature of the sortie as they had thought that its prospects were good and decided that the commander of Marinegruppe West should not limit himself to sending intelligence reports on the position of opposing ships. Orders should be sent to the force commander if he seemed undecided. SKL was not aware of their faulty assessment of the situation and were ignorant of the dispositions made by the British. Grand Admiral Erich Raeder told Hitler that the convoy heading north to Kirkwall had kept going. Raeder wanted another operation and thought that better signals intelligence would limit the risks, the Germans still not knowing that the Home Fleet had been in the area and gone unnoticed. Before the next sortie on 25 February, a destroyer flotilla was sent to the Dogger Bank to attack British trawlers in Unternehmen Wikinger (Operation Viking) and suffered disaster when one destroyer was sunk by a German Heinkel He 111 bomber and another destroyer was sunk by a mine. The loss of two destroyers forced a postponement of the next operation; repairs to Scharnhorst took until 4 march and on 1 March, the directive for the invasion of Denmark and Norway (Operation Weserübung) had been received, requiring a maximum effort; other operations were indefinitely postponed.

== Bibliography ==
- Brennecke, J. (2003). Eismeer Atlantik Ostsee. Die Einsätze des Schweren Kreuzers Admiral Hipper [Arctic Ocean, Atlantic, Baltic Sea. The Operations of the Heavy Cruiser Admiral Hipper] (in German). Munich: Heyne. ISBN 3-453-87084-0.
- Haarr, Geirr (2013). The Gathering Storm: The Naval War in Northern Europe September 1939 – April 1940. Barnsley: Seaforth (Pen & Sword). ISBN 978-1-84832-140-3.
- Hague, Arnold (2000). The Allied Convoy System, 1939–1945: Its Organization, Defence and Operation. Annapolis, MD: Naval Institute Press. ISBN 978-1-55750-019-9.
- Maier, Klaus A.; Rohde, Horst; Stegemann, Bernd; Umbreit, Hans (2015) [1991]. Falla, P. S. (ed.). Germany and the Second World War: Germany's Initial Conquests in Europe. Vol. II. Translated by McMurry, Dean S.; Osers, Ewald (trans. pbk. Clarendon Press, Oxford ed.). Freiburg im Breisgau: Militärgeschichtliches Forschungsamt [Research Institute for Military History]. ISBN 978-0-19-873834-3.
  - Stegemann, Bernd. "Part IV the First Phase of the War up to the Spring of 1940. 4. The War in the North Sea and the Arctic in 1940". In Maier et al. (2015).
- Rohwer, Jürgen; Hümmelchen, Gerhard (2005) [1972]. Chronology of the War at Sea, 1939–1945: The Naval History of World War Two (3rd rev. ed.). London: Chatham Publishing. ISBN 1-86176-257-7.
- Roskill, S. W. (1957) [1954]. Butler, J. R. M. (ed.). The War at Sea 1939–1945: The Defensive. History of the Second World War United Kingdom Military Series. Vol. I (4th impr. ed.). London: HMSO. OCLC 881709135.
