= German submarine U-61 (1939) =

German World War II submarine

History

Nazi Germany
- Name: U-61
- Ordered: 21 July 1937
- Builder: Deutsche Werke AG, Kiel
- Yard number: 260
- Laid down: 1 October 1938
- Launched: 15 June 1939
- Commissioned: 12 August 1939
- Fate: Scuttled at Wilhelmshaven, 5 May 1945

General characteristics
- Class & type: Type IIC coastal submarine
- Displacement: 291 t (286 long tons) surfaced; 341 t (336 long tons) submerged
- Length: 43.90 m (144 ft 0 in) o/a; 29.60 m (97 ft 1 in) pressure hull
- Beam: 4.08 m (13 ft 5 in) (o/a); 4.00 m (13 ft 1 in) (pressure hull)
- Height: 8.40 m (27 ft 7 in)
- Draught: 3.82 m (12 ft 6 in)
- Installed power: 700 PS (510 kW; 690 bhp) (diesels); 410 PS (300 kW; 400 shp) (electric)
- Propulsion: 2 shafts; 2 × diesel engines; 2 × electric motors
- Speed: 12 knots (22 km/h; 14 mph) surfaced; 7 knots (13 km/h; 8.1 mph) submerged
- Range: 1,900 nmi (3,500 km; 2,200 mi) at 12 knots (22 km/h; 14 mph) surfaced; 35–42 nmi (65–78 km; 40–48 mi) at 4 knots (7.4 km/h; 4.6 mph) submerged
- Test depth: 80 m (260 ft)
- Complement: 3 officers, 22 men
- Armament: 3 × 53.3 cm (21 in) torpedo tubes; 5 × torpedoes or up to 12 TMA or 18 TMB mines; 1 × 2 cm (0.79 in) C/30 anti-aircraft gun

Service record
- Part of: 5th U-boat Flotilla; 12 August – 31 December 1939; 1st U-boat Flotilla; 1 January – 14 November 1940; 21st U-boat Flotilla; 15 November 1940 – 27 March 1945
- Identification codes: M 05 425
- Commanders: Oblt.z.S. Jürgen Oesten; 12 August 1939 – 28 July 1940; Kptlt. Wolf-Harro Stiebler; 28 July – 5 November 1940; Oblt.z.S. Willy Matke; 5 November 1940 – 4 May 1941; Oblt.z.S. Hans Lange; 5 May 1941 – 15 January 1942; Oblt.z.S. Horst Geider; 16 January – 9 November 1942; Lt.z.S. / Oblt.z.S. Wolfgang Ley; 10 November 1942 – 15 September 1943; Lt.z.S. / Oblt.z.S. Rudolf Schultze; 16 September 1943 – 1 December 1944; Lt.z.S. Werner Zapf; 2 December 1944 – 27 March 1945
- Operations: 10 patrols: 1st patrol: 24 October – 14 November 1939; 2nd patrol: 28 November – 3 December 1939; 3rd patrol: 7 – 18 December 1939; 4th patrol: 15 – 30 January 1940; 5th patrol: a. 12 – 27 February 1940; b. 29 February – 1 March 1940; 6th patrol: 11 April – 7 May 1940; 7th patrol: 6 June – 1 July 1940; 8th patrol: 6 – 25 July 1940; 9th patrol: 29 August – 15 September 1940; 10th patrol: 24 September – 10 October 1940
- Victories: 5 merchant ships sunk (19,668 GRT); 1 merchant ship damaged (4,434 GRT)

German submarine U-61 was a Type IIC U-boat of Nazi Germany's Kriegsmarine that served in the Second World War. It was built by Deutsche Werke AG, Kiel. Ordered on 21 June 1937, it was laid down on 1 October as yard number 260. It was launched on 15 June 1939 and commissioned on 12 August under the command of Oberleutnant zur See Jürgen Oesten.

U-61 was initially assigned to the 5th U-boat Flotilla during its training period, until 1 January 1940, when it was reassigned to the 1st flotilla for a front-line combat role. U-61 carried out eleven war patrols, sinking five ships for a total of 19,668 gross register tons (GRT) and damaging one of 4,434 tons. It then joined the 21st flotilla as a 'school' or training boat in November 1940 where it remained for the rest of the war.

It was scuttled at Wilhelmshaven on 5 May 1945.

== Design ==
German Type IIC submarines were enlarged versions of the original Type IIs. U-61 had a displacement of 291 tonnes (286 long tons) when at the surface and 341 tonnes (336 long tons) while submerged. Officially, the standard tonnage was 250 long tons (254 t), however. The U-boat had a total length of 43.90 m (144 ft 0 in), a pressure hull length of 29.60 m (97 ft 1 in), a beam of 4.08 m (13 ft 5 in), a height of 8.40 m (27 ft 7 in), and a draught of 3.82 m (12 ft 6 in). The submarine was powered by two MWM RS 127 S four-stroke, six-cylinder diesel engines of 700 metric horsepower (510 kW; 690 shp) for cruising, two Siemens-Schuckert PG VV 322/36 double-acting electric motors producing a total of 410 metric horsepower (300 kW; 400 shp) for use while submerged. She had two shafts and two 0.85 m (3 ft) propellers. The boat was capable of operating at depths of up to 80–150 metres (260–490 ft).

The submarine had a maximum surface speed of 12 knots (22 km/h; 14 mph) and a maximum submerged speed of 7 knots (13 km/h; 8.1 mph). When submerged, the boat could operate for 35–42 nautical miles (65–78 km; 40–48 mi) at 4 knots (7.4 km/h; 4.6 mph); when surfaced, she could travel 3,800 nautical miles (7,000 km; 4,400 mi) at 8 knots (15 km/h; 9.2 mph). U-61 was fitted with three 53.3 cm (21 in) torpedo tubes at the bow, five torpedoes or up to twelve Type A torpedo mines, and a 2 cm (0.79 in) anti-aircraft gun. The boat had a complement of 25.

== Service history ==
=== First, second, third and fourth patrols ===
The U-boat began her first patrol in the North Sea, keeping to the Norwegian side. She departed Kiel on 24 October 1939 and returned there on 14 November. It was uneventful.

Her second effort started in Kiel on 28 November 1939 but finished in Wilhelmshaven on 3 December.

Patrol number three was the reverse of number two - starting from Wilhelmshaven and finishing in Kiel.

Her fourth patrol continued the start/finish changing; starting in Kiel on 15 January 1940 and was terminated in Wilhelmshaven on the 30th. In between she sank the Sydfold about 120 nautical miles (220 km; 140 mi) east of John o' Groats on the 22nd.

=== Fifth, sixth, seventh and eighth patrols ===
U-61's fifth sortie was marked by the sinking of the Sangstad east of Kirkwall (in the Orkney Islands), on 18 February 1940. She had left Wilhelmshaven on 12 February and along with five other U-boats, took part in Operation Nordmark, a reconnaissance mission for the German capital ships Scharnhorst, Gneisenau and Admiral Hipper (for what proved to be an unsuccessful sortie). It took place in the vicinity of the Orkney and Shetland Islands between 18 and 20 February.

Her sixth patrol was uneventful, but her seventh foray included a brief stop in the Norwegian port of Bergen, before moving through the gap between the Faroe and Shetland Islands to the waters almost between mainland Scotland and the Western Isles. The return journey was the reverse of the outbound. At 27 days, it was also her longest patrol. She docked in Kiel on 7 May.

U-61's eighth patrol involved moving slightly further south off the western Northern Irish coast. She returned to Bergen on 1 July 1940.

=== Ninth patrol ===
For her ninth patrol she departed Bergen on 6 July 1940 and sank Alwaki on the tenth. The ship was hit about 10 nautical miles (19 km; 12 mi) northeast of Cape Wrath (the north-west-most point on the Scottish mainland), by two torpedoes that failed to detonate. But they did create holes large enough to allow the water in. The vessel sank about eleven hours after being hit. The Admiralty investigation into the sinking wrongly concluded that the ship had been sabotaged.

The boat also sank Scottish Minstrel 130 nautical miles (240 km; 150 mi) north-west of the Bloody Foreland (on the Irish mainland), on the 16th.

U-61 returned to Kiel, arriving on the 25th.

=== Tenth and eleventh patrols ===
The boat's tenth patrol involved negotiating the Faroer/Shetland gap once again before docking at Lorient in occupied France on 15 September 1940.

Her eleventh and final war patrol was in the other direction. She arrived at the port where she had commenced her war career, Kiel, on 10 October 1940.

== Summary of raiding history ==
Date	Ship	Nationality	Tonnage (GRT)	Fate
22 December 1939	Gryfevale	United Kingdom	4,434	Damaged (Mine)
22 January 1940	Sydfold	Norway	2,434	Sunk
18 February 1940	El Sonador	Panama	1,406	Sunk
18 February 1940	Sangstad	Norway	4,297	Sunk
10 July 1940	Alwaki	Netherlands	4,533	Sunk
16 July 1940	Scottish Minstrel	United Kingdom	6,998	Sunk

== Bibliography ==
- Busch, Rainer; Röll, Hans-Joachim (1999). German U-boat commanders of World War II : a biographical dictionary. Translated by Brooks, Geoffrey. London, Annapolis, Md: Greenhill Books, Naval Institute Press. ISBN 1-55750-186-6.
- Busch, Rainer; Röll, Hans-Joachim (1999). Der U-Boot-Krieg, 1939-1945: Deutsche U-Boot-Verluste von September 1939 bis Mai 1945 [German U-boat losses from September 1939 to May 1945] (in German). Vol. IV. Hamburg, Berlin, Bonn: Mittler. ISBN 3-8132-0514-2.
- Gröner, Eric; Jung, Dieter; Maass, Martin (1991). German Warships 1815-1945: U-boats and Mine Warfare Vessels. Vol. 2. Translated by Thomas, Keith; Magowan, Rachel. London: Conway Maritime Press. ISBN 0-85177-593-4.
