= MV Imperial Transport =

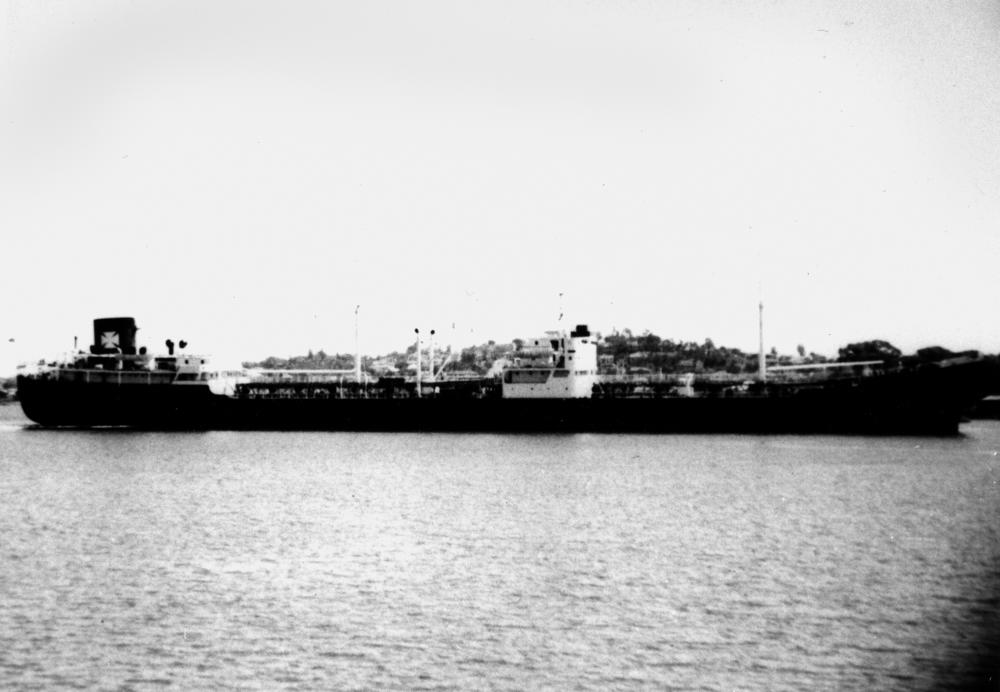
- Imperial Transport at anchor, probably in Australia

History
- Name: Imperial Transport
- Owner: Houlder Line
- Port of registry: United Kingdom, Glasgow
- Builder: Blythswood Shipbuilding Co., Glasgow
- Launched: 17 February 1931
- Completed: 1931
- Identification: UK Official number: 162620; Code letters: GMRB
- Fate: Sold to Victor Jenssens Rederi A/S, 1947
- Name: Imperial Transport
- Owner: Victor Jenssens Rederi A/S
- Operator: Simonsen & Astrup
- Port of registry: Norway, Oslo
- Acquired: 1947
- Renamed: Mesna
- Fate: Sold to Skibs-A/S Agnes, 1949
- Name: Mesna
- Owner: Skibs-A/S Agnes
- Operator: Einar Saanum
- Port of registry: Norway, Mandal
- Acquired: 1949
- Renamed: Rona
- Fate: Scrapped, December 1958

General characteristics
- Type: Oil tanker
- Tonnage: 8,022 GRT; 4,830 NT
- Length: 459 ft 7 in (140.1 m)
- Beam: 60 ft (18.3 m)
- Draught: 27 ft 11 in (8.5 m)
- Depth: 34 ft 5 in (10.5 m)
- Decks: 2
- Installed power: 2 × diesel engines (633 nhp)
- Propulsion: 1 × screw

MV Imperial Transport was an oil tanker built in the early 1930s for the Houlder Line. During World War II, the ship was torpedoed by a German submarine in early 1940 and broke in half. The stern section was saved and a new forward half was built and mated to the ship, which returned to service in 1941. Imperial Transport was torpedoed again in early 1942, but her crew was able to get her back to port. She was repaired in the United States and was back in service by early 1943. The ship was sold to a Norwegian company in 1947, sold again two years later and finally scrapped, in 1958.

== Description ==
Imperial Transport was an 8,022-gross register ton (GRT) oil tanker. She had a net tonnage of 4,830 and a length between perpendiculars of 459 feet 7 inches (140.1 m). The ship had a beam of 60 feet (18.3 m) and a draught of 27 feet 11 inches (8.5 m). She was powered by a pair of four-stroke, eight-cylinder, diesel engines, built by the Northeastern Marine Engineering Co. with a total power of 633 nominal horsepower.

== Construction and career ==
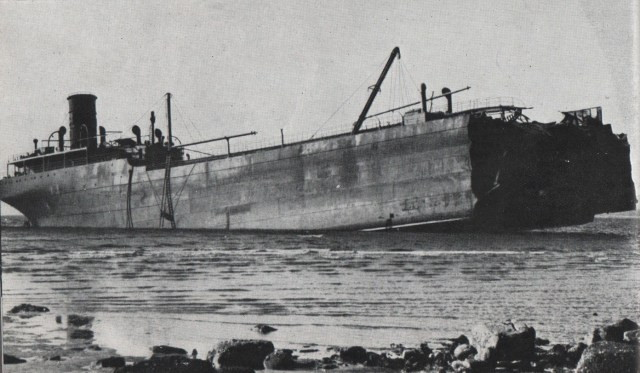
Rear half of Imperial Transport beached on the Isle of Bute, February 1940

Imperial Transport was completed in 1931 for the Houlder Line. On 11 February 1940, the ship was steaming without a cargo, bound for Trinidad, when she was torpedoed by the German submarine U-53. The ship broke in half about five minutes after the impact and the crew abandoned ship (two drowning in the process). Part of the crew re-boarded the stern later that night and the rest of the crew followed. After waiting for the weather to moderate, they got underway again on 13 February and encountered four British destroyers late on the 14th. HMS Kingston was tasked to screen the tanker as she headed for port. The weather deteriorated on the morning of the 15th and the tanker could not make any headway. An attempt to rig a tow by the destroyer failed and she took off the crew during the night. A tugboat and the destroyer Forester arrived, but the weather was too bad to re-board the stern section and Forester took the crew to Scapa Flow. Two more tugs were needed before the stern section could be towed to the Firth of Clyde and beached on the Isle of Bute on 26 February.

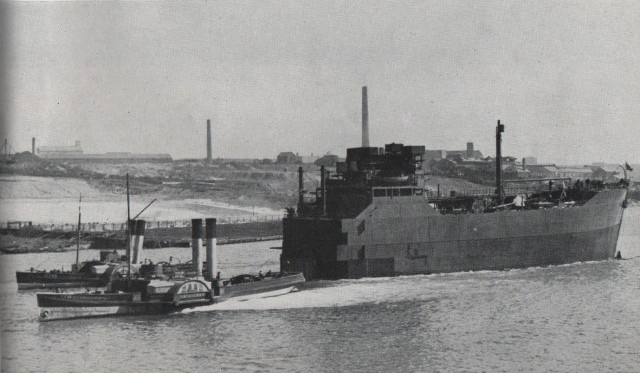
Newly built forward half of Imperial Transport being towed down the River Clyde, 1941

The stern section was later moved to Barclay Curle's dockyard at Elderslie where the damaged portions of the hull were trimmed away. A new forward half was built at Port Glasgow by William Hamilton and Company and mated to the stern section in 1941. The tanker returned to service in June.

Imperial Transport was assigned to Convoy ON 77 when she was torpedoed by U-94 on the morning of 25 March 1942. The two torpedoes disabled the engines and steering gear and caused massive flooding. The crew abandoned ship and was picked up by the French corvette Aconit, but a skeleton crew went back aboard that evening and unsuccessfully tried restart the engines. They returned the following day and managed to pump out some of her flooded compartments and get underway. The ship arrived at St. John's on 30 March where she received temporary repairs. Imperial Transport left St. John's on 24 August for New York and arrived on 5 September. She was repaired at Hoboken, New Jersey by Todd Shipbuilding & Drydock Co. and returned to service in February 1943 with a new spar deck installed for additional deck cargo.

The ship was sold to Victor Jenssens Rederi A/S of Oslo, Norway in 1947 and renamed Mesna. She was then sold to Skibs-A/S Agnes of Mandal two years later and renamed Rona. The ship was broken up in Hamburg, West Germany, in December 1958.
