= German submarine U-63 (1939) =

German World War II submarine

History

Nazi Germany
- Name: U-63
- Ordered: 21 July 1937
- Builder: Deutsche Werke AG, Kiel
- Yard number: 262
- Laid down: 2 January 1939
- Launched: 6 December 1939
- Commissioned: 18 January 1940
- Fate: Sunk, 25 February 1940

General characteristics
- Class & type: Type IIC coastal submarine
- Displacement: 291 t (286 long tons) surfaced; 341 t (336 long tons) submerged
- Length: 43.90 m (144 ft 0 in) o/a; 29.60 m (97 ft 1 in) pressure hull
- Beam: 4.08 m (13 ft 5 in) (o/a); 4.00 m (13 ft 1 in) (pressure hull)
- Height: 8.40 m (27 ft 7 in)
- Draught: 3.82 m (12 ft 6 in)
- Installed power: 700 PS (510 kW; 690 bhp) (diesels); 410 PS (300 kW; 400 shp) (electric)
- Propulsion: 2 shafts; 2 × diesel engines; 2 × electric motors
- Speed: 12 knots (22 km/h; 14 mph) surfaced; 7 knots (13 km/h; 8.1 mph) submerged
- Range: 1,900 nmi (3,500 km; 2,200 mi) at 12 knots (22 km/h; 14 mph) surfaced; 35–42 nmi (65–78 km; 40–48 mi) at 4 knots (7.4 km/h; 4.6 mph) submerged
- Test depth: 80 m (260 ft)
- Complement: 3 officers, 22 men
- Armament: 3 × 53.3 cm (21 in) torpedo tubes; 5 × torpedoes or up to 12 TMA or 18 TMB mines; 1 × 2 cm (0.79 in) C/30 anti-aircraft gun

Service record
- Part of: 1st U-boat Flotilla; 18 January – 25 February 1940
- Identification codes: M 06 536
- Commanders: Oblt.z.S. Günther Lorentz; 18 January – 25 February 1940
- Operations: 1 patrol: 17 – 25 February 1940
- Victories: 1 merchant ship sunk (3,840 GRT)

German submarine U-63 was a Type IIC U-boat of Nazi Germany's Kriegsmarine that served in the Second World War. She was built by Deutsche Werke AG, Kiel. Ordered on 21 July 1937, she was laid down on 2 January 1939 as yard number 262. She was launched on 6 December 1939 and commissioned on 18 January 1940 under the command of Oberleutnant zur See Günther Lorentz.

U-63 was initially assigned to the 1st U-boat Flotilla during her training period, until 1 February 1940. She stayed with that organization until her sinking.

== Design ==
German Type IIC submarines were enlarged versions of the original Type IIs. U-63 had a displacement of 291 tonnes (286 long tons) when at the surface and 341 tonnes (336 long tons) while submerged. Officially, the standard tonnage was 250 long tons (250 t), however. The U-boat had a total length of 43.90 m (144 ft 0 in), a pressure hull length of 29.60 m (97 ft 1 in), a beam of 4.08 m (13 ft 5 in), a height of 8.40 m (27 ft 7 in), and a draught of 3.82 m (12 ft 6 in). The submarine was powered by two MWM RS 127 S four-stroke, six-cylinder diesel engines of 700 metric horsepower (510 kW; 690 shp) for cruising, two Siemens-Schuckert PG VV 322/36 double-acting electric motors producing a total of 410 metric horsepower (300 kW; 400 shp) for use while submerged. She had two shafts and two 0.85 m (3 ft) propellers. The boat was capable of operating at depths of up to 80–150 metres (260–490 ft).

The submarine had a maximum surface speed of 12 knots (22 km/h; 14 mph) and a maximum submerged speed of 7 knots (13 km/h; 8.1 mph). When submerged, the boat could operate for 35–42 nautical miles (65–78 km; 40–48 mi) at 4 knots (7.4 km/h; 4.6 mph); when surfaced, she could travel 3,800 nautical miles (7,000 km; 4,400 mi) at 8 knots (15 km/h; 9.2 mph). U-63 was fitted with three 53.3 cm (21 in) torpedo tubes at the bow, five torpedoes or up to twelve Type A torpedo mines, and a 2 cm (0.79 in) anti-aircraft gun. The boat had a complement of 25.

== Patrol ==
U-63 left the German island of Helgoland (also known as 'Heligoland'), on 17 February 1940. She, along with five other U-boats, took part in Operation Nordmark, a reconnaissance mission for the German Battleships Scharnhorst and Gneisenau and Cruiser Admiral Hipper (for what proved to be an unsuccessful sortie). It took place in the vicinity of the Orkney and Shetland Islands between 18 and 20 February.

The boat sank the Santos off Kirkwall, Orkney, on 24 February 1940.

== Fate ==
U-63 was sunk on 25 February 1940 by a mix of depth charges and torpedoes from the British warships HMS Escort, HMS Inglefield and HMS Imogen and the submarine HMS Narwhal south of Shetland. The approximate location of the wreck site is 58°40′N 00°10′W.

One man died, there were 24 survivors. Those who survived spent the remainder of the war as POWs.

== Summary of raiding history ==
| Date | Ship | Nationality | Tonnage (GRT) | Fate |
|---|---|---|---|---|
| 24 February 1940 | Santos | Sweden | 3,840 | Sunk |

== Bibliography ==
- Busch, Rainer; Röll, Hans-Joachim (1999). German U-boat commanders of World War II : a biographical dictionary. Translated by Brooks, Geoffrey. London, Annapolis, Md: Greenhill Books, Naval Institute Press. ISBN 1-55750-186-6.
- Busch, Rainer; Röll, Hans-Joachim (1999). Der U-Boot-Krieg, 1939-1945: Deutsche U-Boot-Verluste von September 1939 bis Mai 1945 [German U-boat losses from September 1939 to May 1945] (in German). Vol. IV. Hamburg, Berlin, Bonn: Mittler. ISBN 3-8132-0514-2.
- Gröner, Eric; Jung, Dieter; Maass, Martin (1991). German Warships 1815-1945: U-boats and Mine Warfare Vessels. Vol. 2. Translated by Thomas, Keith; Magowan, Rachel. London: Conway Maritime Press. ISBN 0-85177-593-4.
