= German submarine U-50 (1939) =

German World War II submarine

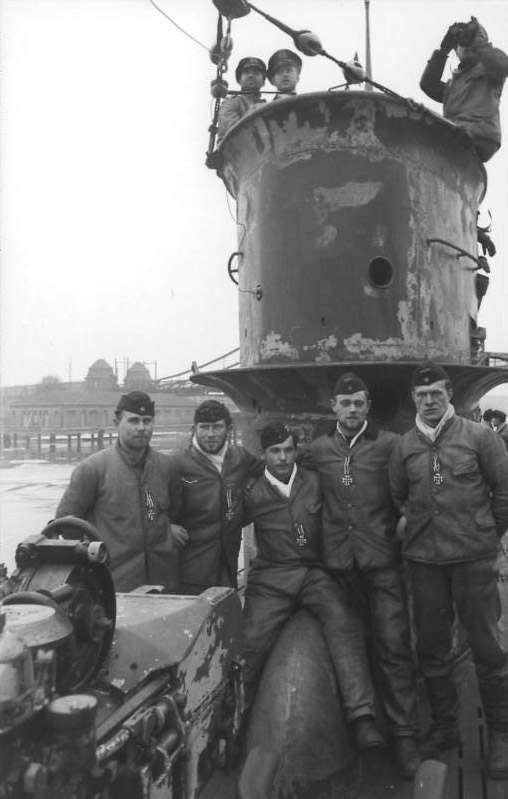
- Crew members of U-50 display their Iron Crosses in Wilhelmshaven on 2 March 1940

History

Nazi Germany
- Name: U-50
- Ordered: 21 November 1936
- Builder: Germaniawerft, Kiel
- Cost: 4,439,000 Reichsmark
- Yard number: 585
- Laid down: 3 November 1938
- Launched: 1 November 1939
- Commissioned: 12 December 1939
- Fate: Sunk, 6 April 1940, in the North Sea north of Terschelling. 44 dead

General characteristics
- Class & type: Type VIIB U-boat
- Displacement: 753 t (741 long tons) surfaced; 857 t (843 long tons) submerged
- Length: 66.50 m (218 ft 2 in) o/a; 48.80 m (160 ft 1 in) pressure hull
- Beam: 6.20 m (20 ft 4 in) o/a; 4.70 m (15 ft 5 in) pressure hull
- Draught: 4.74 m (15 ft 7 in)
- Installed power: 2,800–3,200 PS (2,100–2,400 kW; 2,800–3,200 bhp) (diesels); 750 PS (550 kW; 740 shp) (electric)
- Propulsion: 2 shafts; 2 × diesel engines; 2 × electric motors
- Speed: 17.9 knots (33.2 km/h; 20.6 mph) surfaced; 8 knots (15 km/h; 9.2 mph) submerged
- Range: 8,700 nmi (16,112 km; 10,012 mi) at 10 knots (19 km/h; 12 mph)surfaced; 90 nmi (170 km; 100 mi) at 4 knots (7.4 km/h; 4.6 mph)
- Test depth: 230 m (750 ft).; Calculated crush depth: 250–295 m (820–968 ft)
- Complement: 4 officers, 40–56 enlisted
- Sensors & processing systems: Gruppenhorchgerät
- Armament: 5 × 53.3 cm (21 in) torpedo tubes (four bow, one stern); 14 torpedoes or 26 TMA or 39 TMB mines; 1 × 8.8 cm SK C/35 naval gun with 220 rounds; C30 20 mm flak guns

Service record
- Part of: 7th U-boat Flotilla; 12 December 1939 – 6 April 1940
- Identification codes: M 00 375
- Commanders: Kptlt. Max-Hermann Bauer; 12 December 1939 – 6 April 1940
- Operations: 2 patrols: 1st patrol: 6 February – 4 March 1940; 2nd patrol: 5 – 6 April 1940
- Victories: 4 merchant ships sunk (16.089 GRT)

German submarine U-50 was a Type VIIB U-boat of Nazi Germany's Kriegsmarine during World War II. Ordered on 21 November 1936, she was laid down as yard number 585 at the yards of Friedrich Krupp Germaniawerft AG in Kiel on 3 November 1938. She was launched on 1 November 1939 and commissioned on 12 December 1939 with Kapitänleutnant (Kptlt.) Max-Hermann Bauer, as commander. In her short career she conducted only two patrols, both as part of the 7th U-boat Flotilla. In this time she succeeded in sinking four ships, totalling 16,089 gross register tons (GRT) before being lost in April 1940 to naval mine.

== Design ==
German Type VIIB submarines were preceded by the shorter Type VIIA submarines. U-50 had a displacement of 753 tonnes (741 long tons) when at the surface and 857 tonnes (843 long tons) while submerged. She had a total length of 66.50 m (218 ft 2 in), a beam of 6.20 m (20 ft 4 in), a overall height of 9.50 m (31 ft 2 in), and a draught of 4.74 m (15 ft 7 in). The submarine was powered by two Germaniawerft F46 four-stroke, six-cylinder supercharged diesel engines producing a total of 2,800 to 3,200 metric horsepower (2,060 to 2,350 kW; 2,760 to 3,160 shp) for use while surfaced, two AEG GU 460/8-276 double-acting electric motors producing 750 metric horsepower (550 kW; 740 shp) for use while submerged. The boat was capable of operating at depths of up to 230 metres (750 ft).

The submarine had a maximum surface speed of 17.9 knots (33.2 km/h) and a maximum submerged speed of 8 knots (15 km/h; 9.2 mph). When submerged, the boat could operate for 90 nautical miles (170 km; 100 mi) at 4 knots (7.4 km/h; 4.6 mph); surfaced, she could travel 8,700 nautical miles (16,100 km; 10,000 mi) at 10 knots (19 km/h; 12 mph).

U-50 had five 53.3 cm (21 in) torpedo tubes (four in the bow and one at the stern) with fourteen torpedoes, one 8.8 cm (3.46 in) SK C/35 deck gun with 220 rounds, and a single 20 mm (0.79 in) anti-aircraft gun The boat had a complement of between 44 and 60.

== Service history ==
Departing the German-administered island of Helgoland (sometimes known as Heligoland), on 6 February 1940, U-50 proceeded north of the British Isles. It was here that she sighted her first victim at 22.40 hours on 11 February. The neutral Swedish steam merchant ship Orania (1,854 GRT) was homeward bound from Argentina with a load of maize, bran and oil cakes. Despite running fully illuminated, the U-boat was unable to identify her as neutral but attacked with a single torpedo at 23:54 hours about 65 miles north-northeast of the Shetland Islands. All 24 souls aboard abandoned ship in two lifeboats, but one, with fourteen occupants, was never seen again. The remaining ten survivors were picked up the next day by the destroyer HMS Faulknor, transferred to HMS Foxhound, and landed at Lerwick in Scotland.

In the early morning hours of 15 February, U-50 crossed paths with her second victim, the 4,895 GRT Danish steam merchantman Maryland, which was travelling unescorted. The first torpedo, fired at 01:54 hours, detonated prematurely (a common problem early in the war). The second fired at 02:07 hours broke the ship's back and she sank in seven minutes. All 34 aboard perished; only a wrecked lifeboat was found later, at North Uist.

U-50 travelled south after this encounter and found the neutral Dutch steam merchant ship Tara (4,760 GRT) west of Cape Finisterre. Despite her neutral affiliation, she was travelling without neutrality markings (according to the U-boat captain's log). The submarine had spotted her at midnight and attacked with a single torpedo at 01:38 hours, which missed. A second torpedo at 02:54 hours struck the ship. All hands abandoned ship in two lifeboats as U-50 moved in to deliver the coup de grâce at 03:12 hours. The vessel sank twenty minutes later. One lifeboat made landfall on the Spanish coast, the other was picked up by the Spanish fishing trawler Milin and the occupants landed at A Coruña.

At 00.20 hours on 22 February, U-50 located convoy OGF-19 and torpedoed the 4,580 GRT British tanker British Endeavour about 100 miles west of Vigo, Spain. Five were killed in the attack, the remaining thirty-three (including the ship's master), abandoned ship and were picked up by the British merchantman Bodnant. The survivors were landed at Funchal in Portugal on 26 February.

U-50 ended its patrol at Kiel on 4 March after 28 days at sea.

U-50s begain its second patrol on 5 April 1940. She departed Kiel and was never heard from again. U-50 ran into a minefield in the North Sea north of Terschelling on 6 April and sank. Her exact position is not known. All 44 sailors were killed.

Mines laid by the Allied destroyers HMS Express, Esk, Icarus, and Impulsive on 3 March 1940 were probably responsible for the destruction of U-50 as well as several other U-boats as they returned to port.

== Summary of raiding history ==
Ships sunk
Date	Name of ship	Nationality	Tonnage (GRT)	Fate
11 February 1940	Orania	Sweden	1,854	Sunk
15 February 1940	Maryland	Denmark	4,895	Sunk
21 February 1940	Tara	Netherlands	4,760	Sunk
22 February 1940	British Endeavour	United Kingdom	4,580	Sunk

== Bibliography ==
- Busch, Rainer; Röll, Hans-Joachim (1999). German U-boat commanders of World War II : a biographical dictionary. Translated by Brooks, Geoffrey. London, Annapolis, Md: Greenhill Books, Naval Institute Press. ISBN 1-55750-186-6.
- Busch, Rainer; Röll, Hans-Joachim (1999). Deutsche U-Boot-Verluste von September 1939 bis Mai 1945 [German U-boat losses from September 1939 to May 1945]. Der U-Boot-Krieg (in German). Vol. IV. Hamburg, Berlin, Bonn: Mittler. ISBN 3-8132-0514-2.
- Gröner, Erich; Jung, Dieter; Maass, Martin (1991). U-boats and Mine Warfare Vessels. German Warships 1815–1945. Vol. 2. Translated by Thomas, Keith; Magowan, Rachel. London: Conway Maritime Press. ISBN 0-85177-593-4.
- Kemp, Paul (1999). U-Boats Destroyed – German Submarine Losses in the World Wars. London: Arms & Armour. ISBN 1-85409-515-3.
