= HMS Escort (H66) =

British E-class destroyer

Coordinates: 36°6′35″N 3°22′12″W

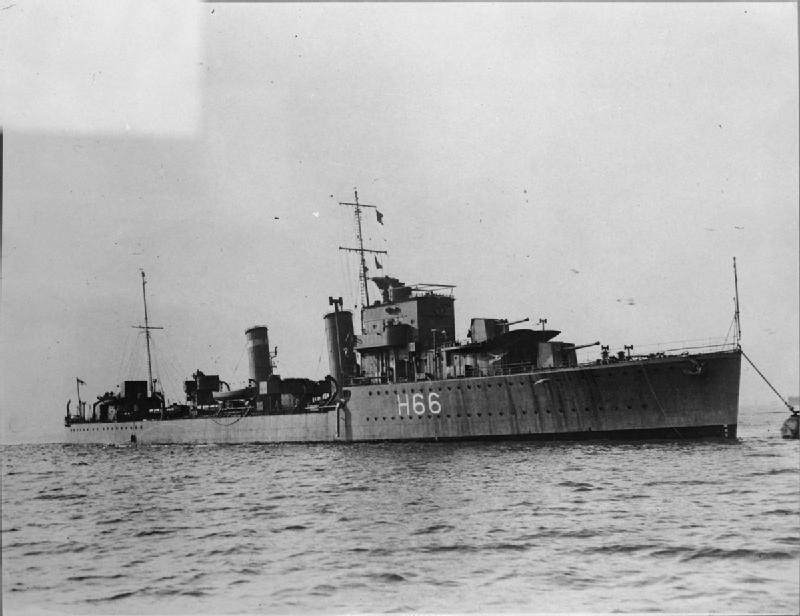
- HMS Escort c. 1937

History

United Kingdom
- Name: HMS Escort
- Ordered: 1 November 1932
- Builder: Scotts Shipbuilding and Engineering Company, Greenock, Scotland
- Cost: £249,587
- Laid down: 30 March 1933
- Launched: 29 March 1934
- Commissioned: 30 October 1934
- Motto: "Fidelitar"; ("Faithfully")
- Fate: Torpedoed by the Italian submarine Guglielmo Marconi, 8 July 1940; Sank while under tow, 11 July 1940
- Notes: Pennant number H66

General characteristics
- Class & type: E-class destroyer
- Displacement: 1,405 long tons (1,428 t) (standard); 1,940 long tons (1,970 t) (deep load)
- Length: 329 ft (100.3 m) o/a
- Beam: 33 ft 3 in (10.13 m)
- Draught: 12 ft 6 in (3.81 m) (deep)
- Installed power: 36,000 shp (26,800 kW); 3 × Admiralty 3-drum boilers
- Propulsion: 2 × shafts; 2 × Parsons geared steam turbines
- Speed: 35.5 knots (65.7 km/h; 40.9 mph)
- Range: 6,350 nmi (11,760 km; 7,310 mi) at 15 knots (28 km/h; 17 mph)
- Complement: 145
- Sensors & processing systems: ASDIC
- Armament: 4 × single QF 4.7-inch (120 mm) Mk IX guns; 2 × quadruple 0.5-inch (12.7 mm) machine guns; 2 × quadruple 21-inch (533 mm) torpedo tubes; 20 × depth charges, 1 rack and 2 throwers

HMS Escort was an E-class destroyer built for the Royal Navy in the early 1930s. Although assigned to the Home Fleet upon completion, the ship was attached to the Mediterranean Fleet in 1935–36, during the Abyssinia Crisis. During the Spanish Civil War of 1936–1939, she spent considerable time in Spanish waters, enforcing the arms blockade imposed by Britain and France on both sides of the conflict. Escort was assigned to convoy escort and anti-submarine patrol duties in the Western Approaches, when the Second World War began in September 1939.

During the Norwegian Campaign, the ship escorted ships of the Home Fleet, although she did tow her sister HMS Eclipse after the latter ship had been badly damaged by German air attack. Escort was assigned to Force H in late June, and participated in the Attack on Mers-el-Kébir in early July. She was torpedoed a few days later by an Italian submarine, but was towed for three days towards Gibraltar before she foundered.

== Description ==
The E-class ships were slightly improved versions of the preceding D class. They displaced 1,405 long tons (1,428 t) at standard load and 1,940 long tons (1,970 t) at deep load. The ships had an overall length of 329 feet (100.3 m), a beam of 33 feet 3 inches (10.1 m) and a draught of 12 feet 6 inches (3.8 m). They were powered by two Parsons geared steam turbines, each driving one propeller shaft, using steam provided by three Admiralty three-drum boilers. The turbines developed a total of 36,000 shaft horsepower (27,000 kW) and gave a maximum speed of 35.5 knots (65.7 km/h; 40.9 mph). Escort carried a maximum of 470 long tons (480 t) of fuel oil that gave her a range of 6,350 nautical miles (11,760 km; 7,310 mi) at 15 knots (28 km/h; 17 mph). The ships' complement was 145 officers and ratings.

The ships mounted four 45-calibre 4.7-inch (120 mm) Mark IX guns in single mounts. For anti-aircraft (AA) defence, they had two quadruple Mark I mounts for the 0.5 inch Vickers Mark III machine gun. The E class was fitted with two above-water quadruple torpedo tube mounts for 21-inch (533 mm) torpedoes. One depth charge rail and two throwers were fitted; 20 depth charges were originally carried, but this increased to 35 shortly after the war began.

== Service ==
Escort was ordered from Scotts Shipbuilding and Engineering Company, at Greenock, Scotland on 1 November 1932, under the 1931 Construction Programme. She was laid down on 30 March 1933, and launched on 29 March 1934. She was commissioned on 30 October 1934, at a total cost of £249,587, excluding government-furnished equipment like the armament. Upon commissioning the ship was assigned to the 5th Destroyer Flotilla of the Home Fleet, aside from a brief deployment in the West Indies between January and March 1935. Afterwards, she was refitted in Sheerness from 27 March to 30 April. Escort was attached to the Mediterranean Fleet from September 1935 to March 1936, during the Abyssinian Crisis. She struck a lock while at Sheerness and required seven weeks of repairs that were not completed until 5 September. The ship patrolled Spanish waters during the Spanish Civil War, enforcing the edicts of the Non-Intervention Committee until 24 March 1939, when she returned to the United Kingdom. Escort became tender to the light cruiser HMS Caledon of the Reserve Fleet upon her return, and was not recommissioned until 2 August, when she was assigned to the 12th Destroyer Flotilla.

On 3 September, Escort and her sister HMS Electra rescued some 300-odd survivors from the ocean liner SS Athenia, which had been torpedoed by the German submarine U-30. The ship was assigned to convoy escort and anti-submarine duties in the Western Approaches Command. She was transferred to Rosyth in December, for similar duties in the North Sea. Escort was refitted at Falmouth between 10 January and 12 February 1940, and resumed her duties afterwards. Together with the destroyers HMS Inglefield and HMS Imogen, she sank the German submarine U-63 on 25 February, after the German vessel had been spotted by the submarine HMS Narwhal some 90 miles (140 km) east of the Orkney Islands.

When the Norwegian Campaign began in early April, Escort was transferred to the Home Fleet, and was screening the capital ships when they sortied into the North Sea looking for the German ship on 9 April. After her sister Eclipse was damaged by air attack on 11 April, Escort towed her to Sullom Voe. The ship escorted the aircraft carriers HMS Glorious and HMS Ark Royal from 25 April, as their aircraft attacked German targets in Norway. She accompanied Glorious when that ship returned to Scapa Flow to refuel and replenish her aircraft on 27 April. The ship was slightly damaged in a collision with the Polish ocean liner Chrobry on 11 May. Escort was based in Scapa Flow as part of the Home Fleet until 26 June, when she sailed for Gibraltar to join Force H. It is uncertain if her rear set of torpedo tubes were replaced by a 3-inch (76.2 mm) (12-pounder) AA gun at this time. She arrived on 2 July, and joined Force H in attacking ships of the French Navy at Mers-el-Kébir the next day. During Operation MA 5, a planned air attack on Italian airfields in Sardinia, Escort was torpedoed by the Guglielmo Marconi on 11 July after the attack had been cancelled due to lack of surprise. The torpedo blew a hole 20 feet (6.1 m) wide between the two boiler rooms, but only killed two members of the crew. Later that morning she foundered.
