= German submarine U-53 (1939) =

German World War II submarine

Coordinates: 60.533333°N 6.233333°W

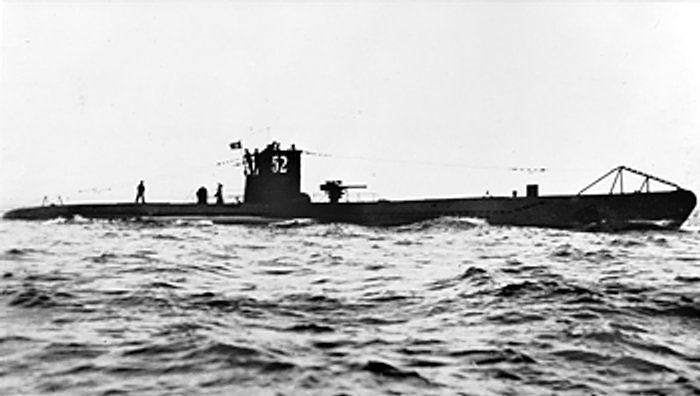
- U-52, a typical Type VIIB boat

History

Nazi Germany
- Name: U-53
- Ordered: 15 May 1937
- Builder: Germaniawerft, Kiel
- Cost: 4,439,000 Reichsmark
- Yard number: 588
- Laid down: 13 March 1937
- Launched: 6 May 1939
- Commissioned: 24 June 1939
- Fate: Sunk, 23 / 24 February 1940

General characteristics
- Class & type: Type VIIB U-boat
- Displacement: 753 t (741 long tons) surfaced; 857 t (843 long tons) submerged
- Length: 66.50 m (218 ft 2 in) o/a; 48.80 m (160 ft 1 in) pressure hull
- Beam: 6.20 m (20 ft 4 in) o/a; 4.70 m (15 ft 5 in) pressure hull
- Draught: 4.74 m (15 ft 7 in)
- Installed power: 2,800–3,200 PS (2,100–2,400 kW; 2,800–3,200 bhp) (diesels); 750 PS (550 kW; 740 shp) (electric)
- Propulsion: 2 shafts; 2 × diesel engines; 2 × electric motors
- Speed: 17.9 knots (33.2 km/h; 20.6 mph) surfaced; 8 knots (15 km/h; 9.2 mph) submerged
- Range: 8,700 nmi (16,112 km; 10,012 mi) at 10 knots (19 km/h; 12 mph)surfaced; 90 nmi (170 km; 100 mi) at 4 knots (7.4 km/h; 4.6 mph)
- Test depth: 230 m (750 ft); Calculated crush depth: 250–295 m (820–968 ft)
- Complement: 4 officers, 40–56 enlisted
- Sensors & processing systems: Gruppenhorchgerät
- Armament: 5 × 53.3 cm (21 in) torpedo tubes (four bow, one stern); 14 × torpedoes or 26 TMA mines; 1 × 8.8 cm (3.46 in) deck gun (220 rounds); 1 × 2 cm (0.79 in) C/30 anti-aircraft gun

Service record
- Part of: 7th U-boat Flotilla; 24 June 1939 – 23 / 24 February 1940
- Identification codes: M 10 424
- Commanders: Oblt.z.S. Dietrich Knorr; 24 June – August 1939; Kptlt. Ernst-Günter Heinicke; August 1939 – 14 January 1940; Oblt.z.S. Heinrich Schonder; December 1939 – January 1940; K.Kapt. Harald Grosse; 15 January – 23 / 24 February 1940
- Operations: 3 patrols: 1st patrol: 29 August – 30 September 1939; 2nd patrol: 21 October – 30 November 1939; 3rd patrol: 2 – 23 / 24 February 1940
- Victories: 7 merchant ships sunk (27,316 GRT); 1 merchant ship damaged (8,022 GRT)

German submarine U-53 was a Type VIIB U-boat of Nazi Germany's Kriegsmarine during World War II. She was laid down on 13 March 1937 at Friedrich Krupp Germaniawerft in Kiel and went into service on 24 June 1939 under the command of Oberleutnant zur See (Oblt.z.S.) Dietrich Knorr.

== Design ==
German Type VIIB submarines were preceded by the shorter Type VIIA submarines. U-53 had a displacement of 753 tonnes (741 long tons) when at the surface and 857 tonnes (843 long tons) while submerged. She had a total length of 66.50 m (218 ft 2 in), a pressure hull length of 48.80 m (160 ft 1 in), a beam of 6.20 m (20 ft 4 in), a height of 9.50 m (31 ft 2 in), and a draught of 4.74 m (15 ft 7 in). The submarine was powered by two MAN M 6 V 40/46 four-stroke, six-cylinder supercharged diesel engines producing a total of 2,800 to 3,200 metric horsepower (2,060 to 2,350 kW; 2,760 to 3,160 shp) for use while surfaced, two AEG GU 460/8-276 double-acting electric motors producing a total of 750 metric horsepower (550 kW; 740 shp) for use while submerged. She had two shafts and two 1.23 m (4 ft) propellers. The boat was capable of operating at depths of up to 230 metres (750 ft).

The submarine had a maximum surface speed of 17.9 knots (33.2 km/h; 20.6 mph) and a maximum submerged speed of 8 knots (15 km/h; 9.2 mph). When submerged, the boat could operate for 90 nautical miles (170 km; 100 mi) at 4 knots (7.4 km/h; 4.6 mph); when surfaced, she could travel 8,700 nautical miles (16,100 km; 10,000 mi) at 10 knots (19 km/h; 12 mph). U-53 was fitted with five 53.3 cm (21 in) torpedo tubes (four fitted at the bow and one at the stern), fourteen torpedoes, one 8.8 cm (3.46 in) SK C/35 naval gun, 220 rounds, and one 2 cm (0.79 in) anti-aircraft gun The boat had a complement of between forty-four and sixty.

== Service history ==
=== First patrol ===
U-53 began her first patrol on 29 August 1939, just prior to the outbreak of the Second World War, under the command of Ernst-Günter Heinicke. Also aboard was Ernst Sobe, the commander of the 7th ("Wegener") Flotilla. U-53 sank two British ships on this patrol: the tanker SS Cheyenne and the freighter SS Kafiristan.

=== Second patrol ===
A second patrol under Heinicke, beginning on 21 October produced no results. U-53, along with U-25 and U-26, was to penetrate the Strait of Gibraltar and raid Allied shipping in the Mediterranean Sea. Daunted by the strong British forces at the straits, Heinicke did not attempt to force them and was transferred to the merchant raider German auxiliary cruiser Widder on his return to Germany.

=== Third patrol ===
Harald Grosse replaced Heinicke for U-53's third and final war patrol, which began on 2 February 1940. Grosse sank six ships for 21,230 gross register tons (GRT), including the Spanish neutral Banderas, whose sinking strained relations between Germany and Spain. On 23 or 24 February (sources vary), U-53 was engaged and sunk by depth charges dropped by the British destroyer HMS Gurkha west of the Orkney Islands with the loss of all hands, (42 dead).

== In popular culture ==
In the 1953 film The Cruel Sea U53 was sunk by the fictitious frigate HMS Saltash Castle, her only kill.

In the film Eye of the Needle U-53 is the escape U-boat of the Needle (played by Donald Sutherland) waiting offshore. This is supposed to happen in 1944 in the timeline of the film.

In the 1958 film I Was Monty's Double U-53 is the U-boat which drops off the German commandos attempting to kidnap who they think is General Montgomery (actually his double played by M.E. Clifton James).

In the 1959 British comedy film Don't Panic Chaps U-53 is depicted as the submarine that surfaces to pick up the "stranded" German forces on an unnamed Adriatic Island.

== Summary of raiding history ==
Date	Ship	Nationality	Tonnage (GRT)	Fate
15 September 1939	Cheyenne	United Kingdom	8,825	Sunk
17 September 1939	Kafiristan	United Kingdom	5,193	Sunk
11 February 1940	Imperial Transport	United Kingdom	8,022	Damaged
11 February 1940	Snestad	Norway	4,114	Sunk
12 February 1940	Dalarö	Sweden	3,927	Sunk
13 February 1940	Norna	Sweden	1,022	Sunk
14 February 1940	Martin Goldschmidt	Denmark	2,095	Sunk
18 February 1940	Banderas	Spain	2,140	Sunk

== Bibliography ==
- Blair, Clay (1996). Hitler's U-Boat War: The Hunters 1939–1942. New York: Random House. ISBN 0-394-58839-8.
- Busch, Rainer; Röll, Hans-Joachim (1999). German U-boat commanders of World War II : a biographical dictionary. Translated by Brooks, Geoffrey. London, Annapolis, Md: Greenhill Books, Naval Institute Press. ISBN 1-55750-186-6.
- Busch, Rainer; Röll, Hans-Joachim (1999). Deutsche U-Boot-Verluste von September 1939 bis Mai 1945 [German U-boat losses from September 1939 to May 1945]. Der U-Boot-Krieg (in German). Vol. IV. Hamburg, Berlin, Bonn: Mittler. ISBN 3-8132-0514-2.
- Gröner, Erich; Jung, Dieter; Maass, Martin (1991). U-boats and Mine Warfare Vessels. German Warships 1815–1945. Vol. 2. Translated by Thomas, Keith; Magowan, Rachel. London: Conway Maritime Press. ISBN 0-85177-593-4.
- Kemp, Paul (1997). U-Boats Destroyed – German Submarine Losses in the World Wars. Arms & Armour. ISBN 1-85409-515-3.
