= German submarine U-14 (1935) =

German World War II submarine

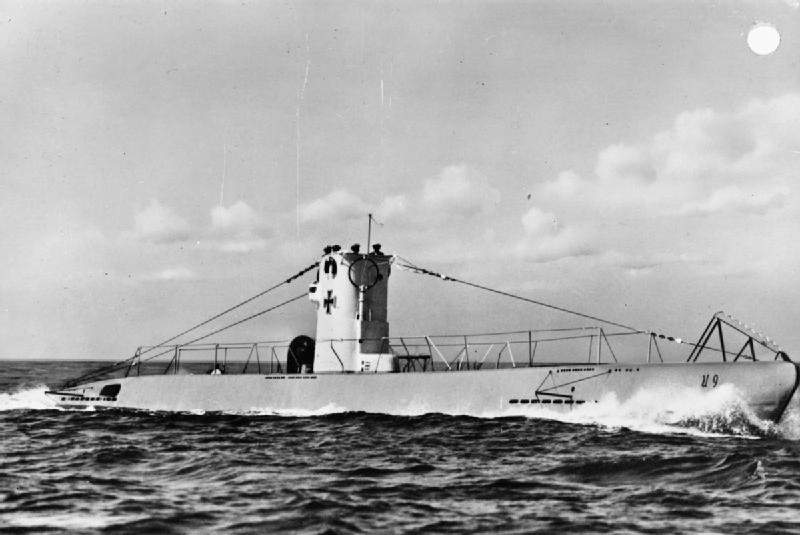
- U-9, a typical Type IIB boat

History

Nazi Germany
- Name: U-14
- Ordered: 2 February 1935
- Builder: Deutsche Werke, Kiel
- Yard number: 249
- Laid down: 6 July 1935
- Launched: 28 December 1935
- Commissioned: 18 January 1936
- Fate: Scuttled on 5 May 1945 at Wilhelmshaven

General characteristics
- Class & type: Type IIB coastal submarine
- Displacement: 279 t (275 long tons) surfaced; 328 t (323 long tons) submerged
- Length: 42.70 m (140 ft 1 in) o/a; 27.80 m (91 ft 2 in) pressure hull
- Beam: 4.08 m (13 ft 5 in) (o/a); 4.00 m (13 ft 1 in) (pressure hull)
- Height: 8.60 m (28 ft 3 in)
- Draught: 3.90 m (12 ft 10 in)
- Installed power: 700 PS (510 kW; 690 bhp) (diesels); 410 PS (300 kW; 400 shp) (electric)
- Propulsion: 2 shafts; 2 × diesel engines; 2 × electric motors
- Speed: 13 knots (24 km/h; 15 mph) surfaced; 7 knots (13 km/h; 8.1 mph) submerged
- Range: 1,800 nmi (3,300 km; 2,100 mi) at 12 knots (22 km/h; 14 mph) surfaced; 35–43 nmi (65–80 km; 40–49 mi) at 4 knots (7.4 km/h; 4.6 mph) submerged
- Test depth: 80 m (260 ft)
- Complement: 3 officers, 22 men
- Armament: 3 × 53.3 cm (21 in) torpedo tubes; 5 × torpedoes or up to 12 TMA or 18 TMB mines; 1 × 2 cm (0.79 in) anti-aircraft gun

Service record
- Part of: 3rd U-boat Flotilla; 1 January 1936 – 1 August 1939; 1 September – 31 October 1939; U-boat Training Flotilla; 1 November 1939 – 1 April 1940; 1st U-boat Training Flotilla; 1 May – 30 June 1940; 24th U-boat Flotilla; 1 July – 31 December 1940; 22nd U-boat Flotilla; 1 January 1941 – 3 March 1945
- Identification codes: M 28 451
- Commanders: Oblt.z.S. / Kptlt. Victor Oehrn; 18 January 1936 – 4 October 1937; Oblt.z.S. / Kptlt. Horst Wellner; 5 October 1937 – 11 October 1939; Oblt.z.S. Herbert Wohlfarth; 19 October 1939 – 1 June 1940; Kptlt. Gerhard Bigalk; 2 June – August 1940; Oblt.z.S. Hans Heidtmann; August – 29 September 1940; Kptlt. Jürgen Könenkamp; 30 September 1940 – 19 May 1941; Oblt.z.S. Hubertus Purkhold; 20 May 1941 – 9 February 1942; Oblt.z.S. Klaus Petersen; 10 February 1942 – 30 June 1942; Oblt.z.S. Walter Köhntopp; 1 July 1942 – 20 July 1943; Lt.z.S. / Oblt.z.S. Karl-Hermann Bortfeldt; 21 July 1943 – 1 July 1944; Lt.z.S. / Oblt.z.S. Hans-Joachim Dierks; 2 July 1944 – 3 March 1945
- Operations: 6 patrols: 1st patrol: a. 30 August – 6 September 1939; b. 7–8 September 1939; 2nd patrol: 13 – 29 September 1939; 3rd patrol: a. 17–18 January 1940; b. 20–26 January 1940; 4th patrol: 11 – 20 February 1940; 5th patrol: 3 – 11 March 1940; 6th patrol: 4 April – 5 May 1940
- Victories: 9 merchant ships sunk (12,344 GRT)

German submarine U-14 was a Type IIB U-boat of Nazi Germany's Kriegsmarine during World War II. It served with 3rd U-boat Flotilla from 18 January 1936 to 31 October 1939. U-14 completed six wartime patrols and sank nine ships totalling 12,344 GRT.

== Design ==
German Type IIB submarines were enlarged versions of the original Type IIs. U-14 had a displacement of 279 tonnes (275 long tons) when at the surface and 328 tonnes (323 long tons) while submerged. Officially, the standard tonnage was 250 long tons (254 t), however. The U-boat had a total length of 42.70 m (140 ft 1 in), a pressure hull length of 28.20 m (92 ft 6 in), a beam of 4.08 m (13 ft 5 in), a height of 8.60 m (28 ft 3 in), and a draught of 3.90 m (12 ft 10 in). The submarine was powered by two MWM RS 127 S four-stroke, six-cylinder diesel engines of 700 metric horsepower (510 kW; 690 shp) for cruising, two Siemens-Schuckert PG VV 322/36 double-acting electric motors producing a total of 460 metric horsepower (340 kW; 450 shp) for use while submerged. She had two shafts and two 0.85 m (3 ft) propellers. The boat was capable of operating at depths of up to 80–150 metres (260–490 ft).

The submarine had a maximum surface speed of 12 knots (22 km/h; 14 mph) and a maximum submerged speed of 7 knots (13 km/h; 8.1 mph). When submerged, the boat could operate for 35–42 nautical miles (65–78 km; 40–48 mi) at 4 knots (7.4 km/h; 4.6 mph); when surfaced, she could travel 3,800 nautical miles (7,000 km; 4,400 mi) at 8 knots (15 km/h; 9.2 mph). U-14 was fitted with three 53.3 cm (21 in) torpedo tubes at the bow, five torpedoes or up to twelve Type A torpedo mines, and a 2 cm (0.79 in) anti-aircraft gun. The boat had a complement of twentyfive.

== Service history ==
Early in the war, on 3 September 1939 in the evening, U-14 attacked a Polish submarine with one torpedo from a surface, and claimed to have sunk it. In reality the Polish submarine, ORP Sęp, was not damaged as the torpedo launched by U-14 exploded prematurely. According to Jan Bartelski, the torpedo also missed the target.

After serving on six operational patrols, U-14 was used as a training boat and transferred to U-boat training flotillas, serving with the 23rd and 24th U-boat Flotillas until the end of the war. Despite the high casualties suffered by the Unterseebootwaffen (German submarine arm), U-14 suffered no known casualties during the war.

U-14 was scuttled on 5 May 1945 at Wilhelmshaven.

== Summary of raiding history ==
Date	Name	Nationality	Tonnage (GRT)	Fate
25 January 1940	Biarritz	Norway	1,752	Sunk
15 February 1940	Rhone	Denmark	1,064	Sunk
16 February 1940	Sliepner	Denmark	1,066	Sunk
16 February 1940	Liana	Sweden	1,646	Sunk
16 February 1940	Osmed	Sweden	1,526	Sunk
7 March 1940	Vecht	Netherlands	1,965	Sunk
9 March 1940	Abbotsford	United Kingdom	1,585	Sunk
9 March 1940	Akeld	United Kingdom	643	Sunk
9 March 1940	Borthwick	United Kingdom	1,097	Sunk

== Bibliography ==
- Busch, Rainer; Röll, Hans-Joachim (1999). German U-boat commanders of World War II : a biographical dictionary. Translated by Brooks, Geoffrey. London, Annapolis, Md: Greenhill Books, Naval Institute Press. ISBN 1-55750-186-6.
- Busch, Rainer; Röll, Hans-Joachim (1999). Deutsche U-Boot-Verluste von September 1939 bis Mai 1945 [German U-boat losses from September 1939 to May 1945]. Der U-Boot-Krieg (in German). Vol. IV. Hamburg, Berlin, Bonn: Mittler. ISBN 3-8132-0514-2.
- Gröner, Erich; Jung, Dieter; Maass, Martin (1991). U-boats and Mine Warfare Vessels. German Warships 1815–1945. Vol. 2. Translated by Thomas, Keith; Magowan, Rachel. London: Conway Maritime Press. ISBN 0-85177-593-4.
- Bishop, Chris (2006). Kriegsmarine U-Boats, 1939-45. London: Amber Books. ISBN 978-1-904687-96-2.
