= German minesweeper M-1 =

1937 German steam powered minesweeper

Coordinates: 60.5670°N 6.9145°E

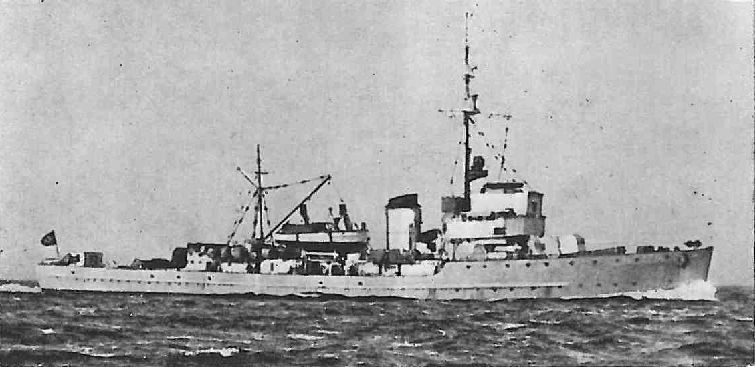

History

Nazi Germany
- Name: M-1
- Builder: Stülcken
- Yard number: 710
- Laid down: 9 July 1936
- Launched: 5 March 1937
- Commissioned: 1 September 1938
- Nickname(s): Tiger der Fjorde
- Fate: Sunk 12 January 1945, Nordbyfjord

General characteristics
- Class & type: M 1935-class minesweeper
- Displacement: 682 tonnes (671 long tons) standard; 874 tonnes (860 long tons) full load
- Length: 68.10 m (223 ft 5 in) o/a; 66.60 m (218 ft 6 in) CWL
- Beam: 8.70 m (28 ft 7 in)
- Draught: 2.65 m (8 ft 8 in)
- Propulsion: 2 shaft VTE engines with exhaust turbines, 2 oil-fired boilers, 3,500 PS (2,574 kW; 3,452 shp)
- Speed: 18.3 knots (33.9 km/h; 21.1 mph)
- Range: 5,000 nmi (9,300 km; 5,800 mi) at 10 knots (19 km/h; 12 mph)
- Complement: 95
- Armament: 2 × 10.5 cm (4.1 in) SK L/45 guns; 2 × 3.7 cm (1.5 in) AA guns; 2 × 2 cm (0.79 in) AA guns; 30 naval mines

Service record
- Part of: 1. Minensuchflottille; 2. Minensuchflottille; 4. Minensuchflottille; 55. Vorpostenflottille; 52. Minensuchflottille
- Commanders: Kptlt. Hans Bartels; 5 March 1939 - April 1940; Albrecht Brandi; April 40 - March 1941; Lt.z.S.d.R. Dornberger; 1943; Eberhard Kühn; April 1944 - January 1945
- Operations: Battle of the Danzig Bay; Operation Weserübung; Operation Siegfried

German minesweeper M-1 was a M 1935-class minesweeper of Nazi Germany's Kriegsmarine in World War II.

== History ==
Laid down in 1936, M-1 was launched on 5 March 1937. Commissioned on 1 September 1938 under the command of Oberleutnant zur See Hans Bartels, she was used to transfer the Marinestosstruppkompanie to the battleship Schleswig-Holstein on 24 August 1939 in preparation for the Invasion of Poland. After service in the campaign, M-1 was relocated to the North Sea.

In February 1940, M-1 sank four Esbjerg fish trawlers, Ejjam (E 92), Gerlis (E 456), Merkator (348), and Polaris (E 504), killing all 16 crew members. Bartels later justified his decision with military necessity, as the neutral fishermen allegedly send coded messages to alert British forces to his presence on the Doggerbank.

After the German attack on the Soviet Union, M-1 was part of the naval component of Operation Siegfried, the occupation of the islands Dagö, Ösel, and Moon. Soon afterwards, M-1 became flotilla leader of 55. Vorpostenflottille operating on the west coast of occupied Norway.

On 12 January 1945, M-1 was sunk in Nordbyfjord, near Bergen in Norway, by Avro Lancaster aircraft of 9 and 617 Squadrons, Royal Air Force, using Tallboy bombs. She sank with the loss of 20 crew members. The wreck lies in 340 metres (1,120 ft) of water, partly covered in sand.
