= SS Linda (1899) =

1899 Estonian ship

History
- Name: (Germany) SS Hermes (1899-1914); (Belgium) SS Hermes (1914–1921); (United Kingdom) SS Glendoon (1921–1922); (Germany) SS Heidelberg (1922–1925); (Germany) SS Alt Heidelberg (1925–1928); (Estonia) SS Linda (1928–1940)
- Owner: Tiedemann O
- Port of registry: Tallinn, Estonia
- Builder: Ailsa Shipbuilding Co. Ltd.
- Yard number: 77
- Launched: 4 March 1899
- Completed: 1899
- Identification: 251; HCFU
- Fate: Torpedoed and sunk 11 February 1940

General characteristics
- Type: Cargo ship
- Tonnage: 1,213 GRT
- Length: 70 metres (229 ft 8 in)
- Beam: 10.4 metres (34 ft 1 in)
- Depth: 4.63 metres (15 ft 2 in)
- Installed power: Triple expansion steam engine
- Propulsion: Screw propeller
- Speed: 8.5 knots

SS Linda was an Estonian Cargo Ship that was torpedoed by U-9 in the North Sea 100 nautical miles (190 km) west of Utsira, Norway (58°15′N 1°54′E), while she was travelling from Blyth, United Kingdom to Gothenburg, Sweden.

== Construction ==
Linda was constructed in 1899 at the Ailsa Shipbuilding Co. Ltd. shipyard in Troon, Scotland. The ship was 70 metres (229 ft 8 in) long, with a beam of 10.4 metres (34 ft 1 in) and a depth of 4.63 metres (15 ft 2 in). The ship was assessed at 1,213 GRT. She had a triple expansion engine driving a single screw propeller and one boiler. The engine was rated at 137 nhp.

== Sinking ==
On 11 February 1940, Linda was on a voyage from Blyth, United Kingdom to Gothenburg, Sweden; when she was hit by one torpedo fired by the German submarine U-9 in the North Sea 100 nautical miles (190 km) west of Utsira, Norway. She broke in two and her forepart sank immediately, the stern followed four minutes later. One person was killed, the 14 survivors were rescued by SS Birgitta .
