= HMS Gurkha (F20) =

Destroyer of the Royal Navy

Coordinates: 59°13′0″N 4°0′0″E

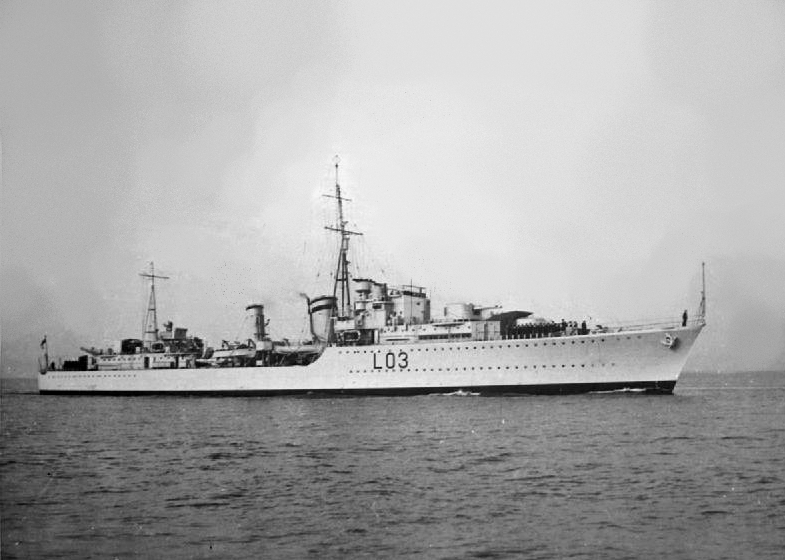
- Sister ship Cossack in 1938

History

United Kingdom
- Name: Gurkha
- Namesake: Gurkha
- Ordered: 10 March 1936
- Builder: Fairfield Shipbuilding and Engineering, Govan
- Laid down: 6 July 1936
- Launched: 7 July 1937
- Completed: 21 October 1938
- Fate: Sunk by aircraft, 9 April 1940
- Badge: On a Field Blue, two crossed Kukri proper

General characteristics (as built)
- Class & type: Tribal-class destroyer
- Displacement: 1,891 long tons (1,921 t) (standard); 2,519 long tons (2,559 t) (deep load)
- Length: 377 ft (114.9 m) (o/a)
- Beam: 36 ft 6 in (11.13 m)
- Draught: 11 ft 3 in (3.43 m)
- Installed power: 3 × Admiralty 3-drum boilers; 44,000 shp (33,000 kW)
- Propulsion: 2 × shafts; 2 × geared steam turbines
- Speed: 36 knots (67 km/h; 41 mph)
- Range: 5,700 nmi (10,600 km; 6,600 mi) at 15 knots (28 km/h; 17 mph)
- Complement: 190
- Sensors & processing systems: ASDIC
- Armament: 4 × twin 4.7 in (120 mm) guns; 1 × quadruple 2-pdr (40 mm (1.6 in)) AA guns; 2 × quadruple 0.5 in (12.7 mm) anti-aircraft machineguns; 1 × quadruple 21 in (533 mm) torpedo tubes; 20 × depth charges, 1 × rack, 2 × throwers

HMS Gurkha was a Tribal-class destroyer built for the British Royal Navy during the 1930s. Completed in 1938, she was initially assigned to the Mediterranean Fleet. After the beginning of World War II in September 1939, the ship was briefly deployed to the Red Sea until she was recalled to British waters to serve with the Home Fleet the following month. Mechanical issues caused her to be docked for repairs from December to February 1940. Later that month, Gurkha sank a German U-boat. The ship was on escort duties at the beginning of the Norway campaign in April. Gurkha was sunk by German bombers during one such mission; only 16 crewmen were killed during the attack.

== Description ==
The Tribals were intended to counter the large destroyers being built abroad and to improve the firepower of the existing destroyer flotillas and were thus significantly larger and more heavily armed than the preceding I class. The ships displaced 1,891 long tons (1,921 t) at standard load and 2,519 long tons (2,559 t) at deep load. They had an overall length of 377 feet (114.9 m), a beam of 36 feet 6 inches (11.13 m) and a draught of 11 feet 3 inches (3.43 m). The destroyers were powered by two Parsons geared steam turbines, each driving one propeller shaft using steam provided by three Admiralty three-drum boilers. The turbines developed a total of 44,000 shaft horsepower (33,000 kW) and gave a maximum speed of 36 knots (67 km/h; 41 mph). During her sea trials Ghurka made 36.4 knots (67.4 km/h; 41.9 mph) from 45,210 shp (33,710 kW) at a displacement of 1,999 long tons (2,031 t). The ships carried enough fuel oil to give them a range of 5,700 nautical miles (10,600 km; 6,600 mi) at 15 knots (28 km/h; 17 mph). The ships' complement consisted of 190 officers and ratings, although the flotilla leaders carried an extra 20 officers and men consisting of the Captain (D) and his staff.

The primary armament of the Tribal-class destroyers was eight quick-firing (QF) 4.7-inch (120 mm) Mark XII guns in four superfiring twin-gun mounts, one pair each fore and aft of the superstructure, designated 'A', 'B', 'X', and 'Y' from front to rear. The mounts had a maximum elevation of 40°. For anti-aircraft (AA) defence, they carried a single quadruple mount for the 40-millimetre (1.6 in) QF two-pounder Mk II "pom-pom" gun and two quadruple mounts for the 0.5-inch (12.7 mm) Mark III machine gun. Low-angle fire for the main guns was controlled by the director-control tower (DCT) on the bridge roof that fed data acquired by it and the 12-foot (3.7 m) rangefinder on the Mk II Rangefinder/Director directly aft of the DCT to an analogue mechanical computer, the Mk I Admiralty Fire Control Clock. Anti-aircraft fire for the main guns was controlled by the Rangefinder/Director which sent data to the mechanical Fuze Keeping Clock.

The ships were fitted with a single above-water quadruple mount for 21-inch (533 mm) torpedoes. The Tribals were not intended as anti-submarine ships, but they were provided with ASDIC, one depth charge rack and two throwers for self-defence, although the throwers were not mounted in all ships; Twenty depth charges was the peacetime allotment, but this increased to 30 during wartime.

== Construction and career ==
Authorized as one of seven Tribal-class destroyers under the 1935 Naval Estimates, Gurkha (originally Ghurka) was the second ship of her name to serve in the Royal Navy. The ship was ordered on 10 March 1936 from Fairfield Shipbuilding and Engineering and was laid down on 6 July at the company's Govan shipyard. Launched on 7 July 1937, Gurkha was commissioned on 21 October at a cost of £340,997 which excluded weapons and communications outfits furnished by the Admiralty. The ship's completion was delayed by the late delivery of her gunsights.

On commissioning, Gurkha joined the First Tribal Destroyer Flotilla (which was renamed the 4th Destroyer Flotilla (DF) in April 1939) as part of the Mediterranean Fleet. She was involved in exercises and port visits until the outbreak of war, suffering minor damage in a collision with sister ship Sikh on 2 March 1939. Repairs at Malta lasted until 21 April. In September, Gurkha was one of a group of ships assigned to monitor Italian naval activity in the Red Sea after the war began. In October 1939 the flotilla was reassigned to the Home Fleet, on escort duty from Portland. Gurkha, like many of the Tribals, suffered from mechanical defects including problems with the ship's turbines and leaks in the reserve feed tanks, and underwent repair at Thornycroft's Southampton shipyard from December 1939 to January 1940, before rejoining her flotilla, now based at Scapa Flow.

On the night of 23/24 February 1940, Gurkha spotted the German submarine U-53 on the surface between the Faroe Islands and Orkney Islands in the moonlight. The submarine dived to avoid a ramming attempt by the destroyer; Gurkha responded with a series of 13 depth charges, which sank U-53 with the loss of all hands.

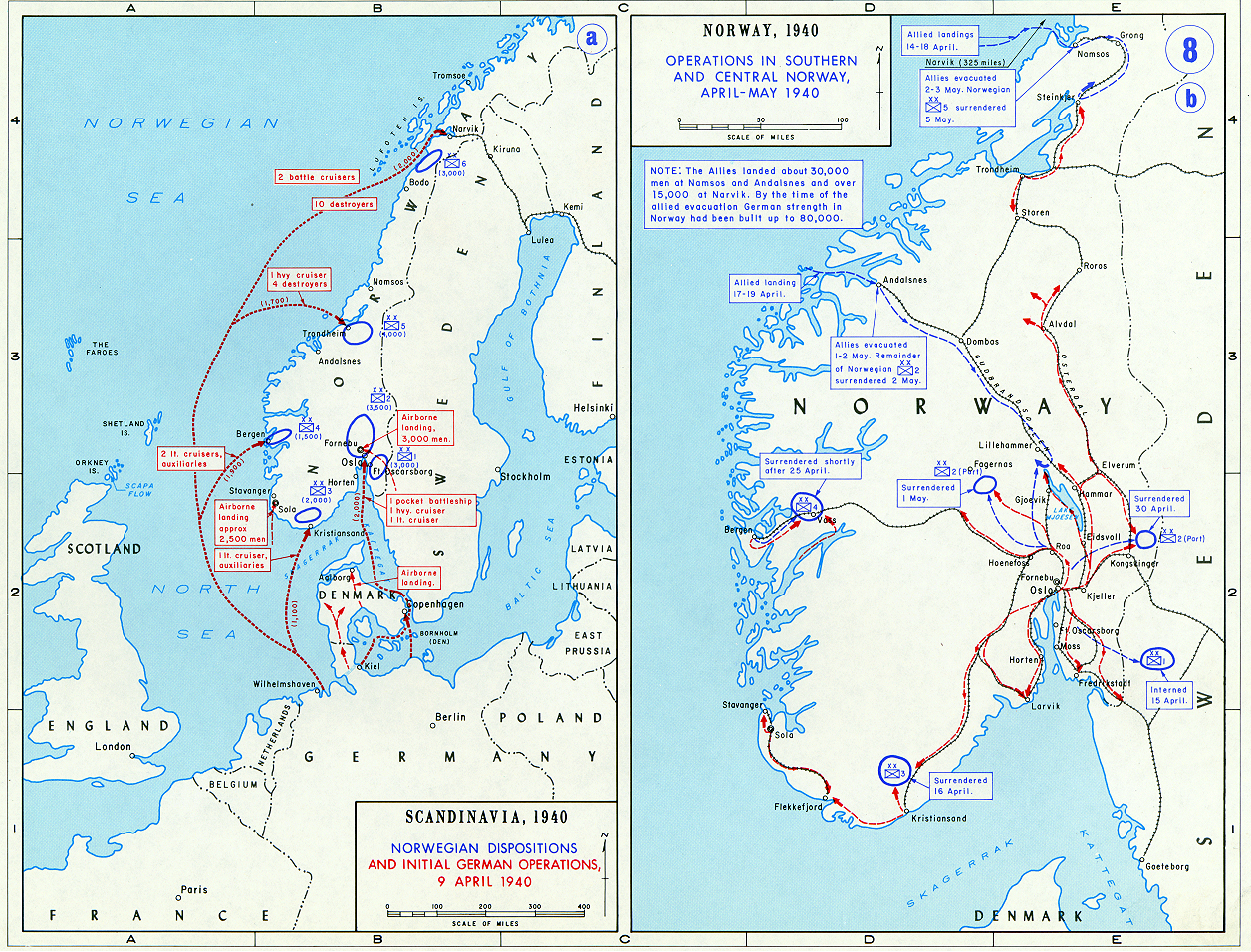
Maps covering the operations in central and southern Norway, April–May 1940

Receiving word that the Royal Air Force had attacked north-bound German warships in the North Sea on 7 April, the Home Fleet put to sea that evening. The 2nd Cruiser Squadron departed Rosyth with its two light cruisers, escorted by Gurkha and the 4th DF, with orders to sweep through the North Sea before rendezvousing with the main body of the Home Fleet. On the morning of 9 April, following the news that Germany had invaded Norway, the 4th DF was tasked with attacking Bergen, Norway, covered by the 18th Cruiser Squadron, which consisted of the light cruisers Southampton, Manchester, Glasgow, and Sheffield, but the Admiralty cancelled the attack that afternoon when it received reports that two German light cruisers were in port. The British force was attacked by 47 German Ju 88 and 41 He 111 bombers of Kampfgeschwader 30 and Kampfgeschwader 26. The ships were steaming into a head sea which threw spray over their bows and the gun directors, degrading their performance.

In an attempt to obtain better firing conditions, Gurkha moved away from the mutual protection of the squadron. She then became an easy target for the bombers; a single bomb hit alongside near the stern, blowing a hole 40-foot-long (12.2 m) hole in her starboard side shortly after 14:00. Her engine room and most of the aft compartments soon flooded and the destroyer began to drift with her stern nearly awash. Gurkha soon had a 45-degree list. The forward guns were still operable and engaged attacking aircraft with little effect. Radio contact could not be established for several hours, but eventually the light cruiser Aurora responded. The destroyer's crew fired the forward guns at maximum elevation to guide the cruiser to the ship and Aurora was spotted on the horizon at 18:55. Transferring the survivors to the cruiser was slow and only about half had been taken aboard when Gurkha's captain was forced to order abandon ship at 20:45. Aurora and several destroyers that had recently arrived were able to rescue most of the remaining crewmen from the water. A total of 199 survivors were recovered; Gurkha sank with the loss of 16 of her crew.
