= German submarine U-10 (1935) =

German World War II submarine

Coordinates: 54°24′N 18°42′E

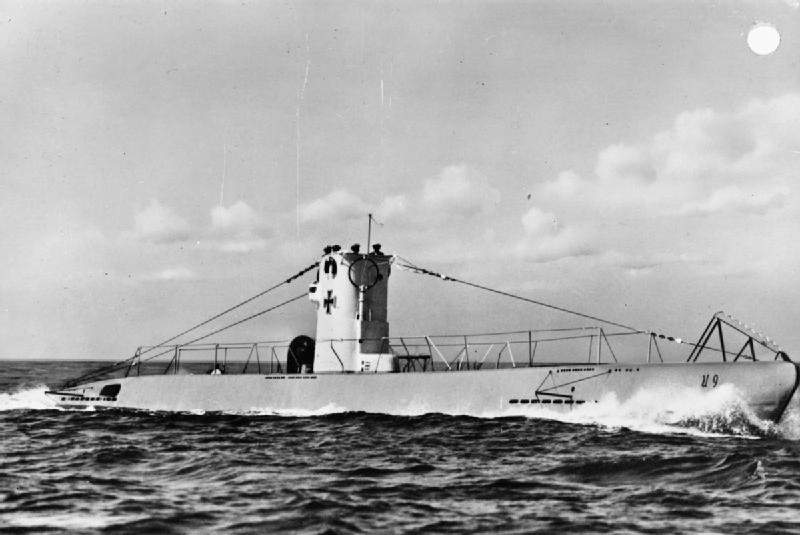
- U-9, a typical Type IIB boat

History

Nazi Germany
- Name: U-10
- Ordered: 20 July 1934
- Builder: Germaniawerft, Kiel
- Yard number: 544
- Laid down: 22 April 1935
- Launched: 13 August 1935
- Commissioned: 9 September 1935
- Fate: Stricken 1 August 1944 at Danzig

General characteristics
- Class & type: Type IIB coastal submarine
- Displacement: 279 t (275 long tons) surfaced; 328 t (323 long tons) submerged
- Length: 42.70 m (140 ft 1 in) o/a; 27.80 m (91 ft 2 in) pressure hull
- Beam: 4.08 m (13 ft 5 in) (o/a); 4.00 m (13 ft 1 in) (pressure hull)
- Height: 8.60 m (28 ft 3 in)
- Draught: 3.90 m (12 ft 10 in)
- Installed power: 700 PS (510 kW; 690 bhp) (diesels); 410 PS (300 kW; 400 shp) (electric)
- Propulsion: 2 shafts; 2 × diesel engines; 2 × electric motors
- Speed: 13 knots (24 km/h; 15 mph) surfaced; 7 knots (13 km/h; 8.1 mph) submerged
- Range: 1,800 nmi (3,300 km; 2,100 mi) at 12 knots (22 km/h; 14 mph) surfaced; 35–43 nmi (65–80 km; 40–49 mi) at 4 knots (7.4 km/h; 4.6 mph) submerged
- Test depth: 80 m (260 ft)
- Complement: 3 officers, 22 men
- Armament: 3 × 53.3 cm (21 in) torpedo tubes; 5 × torpedoes or up to 12 TMA or 18 TMB mines; 1 × 2 cm (0.79 in) anti-aircraft gun

Service record
- Part of: U-boat School Flotilla; 11 – 26 September 1935; 1st U-boat Flotilla; 27 September 1935 – 3 October 1937; 3rd U-boat Flotilla; 4 October 1937 – 14 April 1939; U-boat School Flotilla; 15 April 1939 – 30 June 1940; 21st U-boat Flotilla; 1 July 1940 – 1 August 1944
- Identification codes: M 04 324
- Commanders: Oblt.z.S. Heinz Scheringer; 11 September – 21 December 1935; K.Kapt. Werner Emil Hermann Scheer; 21 December 1935 – 1 May 1936; Oblt.z.S. / Kptlt. Heinz Beduhn; 1 May 1936 – 29 September 1937; Kptlt. Hannes Weingärtner; 30 September 1937 – 3 April 1938; Kptlt. Hans-Rudolf Rösing; October 1937 – August 1938; Kptlt. Herbert Sohler; 4 April – 31 July 1938; Oblt.z.S. Kurt von Gossler; 1 August 1938 – 4 January 1939; Oblt.z.S. / Kptlt. Georg-Wilhelm Schulz; 5 January – 15 October 1939; Oblt.z.S. Günther Lorentz; 10 October 1939 – 2 January 1940; Oblt.z.S. Joachim Preuss; January – 9 June 1940; Kptlt. Rolf Mützelburg; 10 June – 29 November 1940; Kptlt. Wolf-Rüdiger von Rabenau; 30 November 1940 – 9 June 1941; Oblt.z.S. Kurt Ruwiedel; 10 June – 29 November 1941; Oblt.z.S. Hans Karpf; 30 November 1941 – 22 June 1942; Oblt.z.S. Christian-Brandt Coester; 23 June 1942 – February 1943; Oblt.z.S. Wolfgang Strenger; February 1943 – February 1944; Oblt.z.S. Kurt Ahlers; February – 1 July 1944
- Operations: 5 patrols: 1st patrol: 7 – 19 September 1939; 2nd patrol: 26 September – 15 October 1939; 3rd patrol: a. 28–31 January 1940; b. 5 February 1940; 4th patrol: 14 – 20 February 1940; 5th patrol: 3 – 23 April 1940
- Victories: 2 merchant ships sunk (6,356 GRT)

German submarine U-10 was a Type IIB U-boat built before World War II for service in Nazi Germany's Kriegsmarine. As she was one of the first batch of boats built following the renunciation of the Treaty of Versailles, she was only capable of coastal and short cruising work. This led to her being reassigned to training duties after the Norwegian campaign of 1940 together with many of her sister boats.

After almost five years she was stricken on 1 August 1944 at Danzig (now Gdańsk) and broken up.

== Design ==
German Type IIB submarines were enlarged versions of the original Type IIs. U-10 had a displacement of 279 tonnes (275 long tons) when at the surface and 328 tonnes (323 long tons) while submerged. Officially, the standard tonnage was 250 long tons (250 t), however. The U-boat had a total length of 42.70 m (140 ft 1 in), a pressure hull length of 28.20 m (92 ft 6 in), a beam of 4.08 m (13 ft 5 in), a height of 8.60 m (28 ft 3 in), and a draught of 3.90 m (12 ft 10 in). The submarine was powered by two MWM RS 127 S four-stroke, six-cylinder diesel engines of 700 metric horsepower (510 kW; 690 shp) for cruising, two Siemens-Schuckert PG VV 322/36 double-acting electric motors producing a total of 460 metric horsepower (340 kW; 450 shp) for use while submerged. She had two shafts and two 0.85 m (3 ft) propellers. The boat was capable of operating at depths of up to 80–150 metres (260–490 ft).

The submarine had a maximum surface speed of 12 knots (22 km/h; 14 mph) and a maximum submerged speed of 7 knots (13 km/h; 8.1 mph). When submerged, the boat could operate for 35–42 nautical miles (65–78 km; 40–48 mi) at 4 knots (7.4 km/h; 4.6 mph); when surfaced, she could travel 3,800 nautical miles (7,000 km; 4,400 mi) at 8 knots (15 km/h; 9.2 mph). U-10 was fitted with three 53.3 cm (21 in) torpedo tubes at the bow, five torpedoes or up to twelve Type A torpedo mines, and a 2 cm (0.79 in) anti-aircraft gun. The boat had a complement of twentyfive.

== Operational history ==
U-10 was one of the first batch of submarines to be assigned to an operational unit of the Kriegsmarine, serving with the 1st U-boat Flotilla, at the time known as the Weddigen Flotilla.

=== Summary of raiding history ===
Date	Name	Nationality	Tonnage (GRT)	Fate
17 February 1940	Kvernaas	Norway	1,819	Sunk
18 February 1940	Ameland	Netherlands	4,537	Sunk

== Bibliography ==
- Busch, Rainer; Röll, Hans-Joachim (1999). German U-boat commanders of World War II : a biographical dictionary. Translated by Brooks, Geoffrey. London, Annapolis, Md: Greenhill Books, Naval Institute Press. ISBN 1-55750-186-6.
- Gröner, Erich; Jung, Dieter; Maass, Martin (1991). U-boats and Mine Warfare Vessels. German Warships 1815–1945. Vol. 2. Translated by Thomas, Keith; Magowan, Rachel. London: Conway Maritime Press. ISBN 0-85177-593-4.
