= HMS Imogen (D44) =

I-class destroyer of the Royal Navy

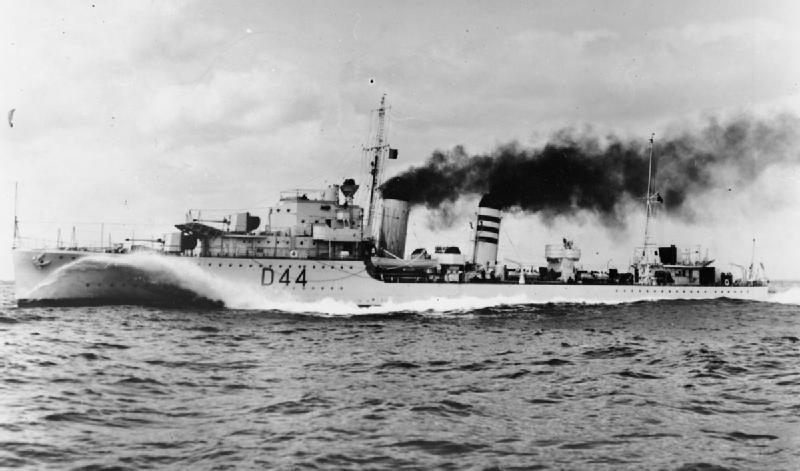
- The three black bands on Imogen's aft funnel show her membership of the 3rd Destroyer Flotilla

History

United Kingdom
- Name: Imogen
- Ordered: 30 October 1935
- Builder: Hawthorn Leslie, Hebburn
- Cost: £256,917
- Laid down: 18 January 1936
- Launched: 30 December 1936
- Completed: 2 June 1937
- Identification: Pennant number: D44
- Fate: Sunk in a collision with Glasgow, 16 July 1940

General characteristics (as built)
- Class & type: I-class destroyer
- Displacement: 1,370 long tons (1,390 t) (standard); 1,888 long tons (1,918 t) (deep load)
- Length: 323 ft (98.5 m)
- Beam: 33 ft (10.1 m)
- Draught: 12 ft 6 in (3.8 m)
- Installed power: 3 Admiralty 3-drum boilers; 34,000 shp (25,000 kW)
- Propulsion: 2 shafts, 2 geared steam turbines
- Speed: 35.5 knots (65.7 km/h; 40.9 mph)
- Range: 5,500 nmi (10,200 km; 6,300 mi) at 15 knots (28 km/h; 17 mph)
- Complement: 145
- Sensors & processing systems: ASDIC
- Armament: 4 × single 4.7 in (120 mm) guns; 2 × quadruple 0.5-inch (12.7 mm) machine guns; 2 × quintuple 21 in (533 mm) torpedo tubes; 1 × rack and 2 throwers for 16 depth charges

Service record
- Victories: U-42 (October 1939); U-63 (February 1940)

HMS Imogen was a I-class destroyer built for the Royal Navy in the mid-1930s. During the Spanish Civil War of 1936–1939, the ship enforced the arms blockade imposed by Britain and France on both sides as part of the Mediterranean Fleet. After the start of the Second World War the ship was transferred to Home Fleet and participated in the Norwegian Campaign in April 1940. Imogen sank two German submarines before her own sinking following an accidental collision in July 1940.

== Description ==
The I-class ships were improved versions of the preceding H-class. They displaced 1,370 long tons (1,390 t) at standard load and 1,888 long tons (1,918 t) at deep load. The ships had an overall length of 323 feet (98.5 m), a beam of 33 feet (10.1 m) and a draught of 12 feet 6 inches (3.8 m). They were powered by two Parsons geared steam turbines, each driving one propeller shaft, using steam provided by three Admiralty three-drum boilers. The turbines developed a total of 34,000 shaft horsepower (25,000 kW) and were intended to give a maximum speed of 35.5 knots (65.7 km/h; 40.9 mph). Imogen only reached a speed of 33.8 knots (62.6 km/h; 38.9 mph) from 34,268 shp (25,554 kW) during her sea trials. The ships carried enough fuel oil to give them a range of 5,500 nautical miles (10,200 km; 6,300 mi) at 15 knots (28 km/h; 17 mph). Their crew numbered 145 officers and ratings.

The ships mounted four 4.7-inch (120 mm) Mark IX guns in single mounts, designated 'A', 'B', 'X' and 'Y' from bow to stern. For anti-aircraft (AA) defence, they had two quadruple mounts for the 0.5 inch Vickers Mark III machine gun. The I class was fitted with two above-water quintuple torpedo tube mounts amidships for 21-inch (533 mm) torpedoes. One depth charge rack and two throwers were fitted; 16 depth charges were originally carried, but this increased to 35 shortly after the war began. The I-class ships were fitted with the ASDIC sound detection system to locate submarines underwater.

== Construction ==
The ship was ordered on 30 October 1935 from Hawthorn Leslie at Hebburn under the 1935 Naval Programme. She was laid down on 18 January 1936, launched on 30 December 1936, as the seventh Royal Navy ship to carry this name, and completed on 2 June 1937, at a contract price of £256,917, excluding items supplied by Admiralty such as armaments and communications equipment.

== Career ==
Imogen was assigned to the 3rd Destroyer Flotilla of the Mediterranean Fleet upon commissioning and was initially based in Malta. Transferred to Gibraltar, she patrolled Spanish waters enforcing the policies of the Non-Intervention Committee during 1938. The ship was given a brief refit in Malta from 17 October–28 November 1938 and another at Sheerness Dockyard in August 1939.

At the beginning of the Second World War Imogen returned to the Mediterranean on 3 September, but she was transferred to the Western Approaches Command for convoy escort duties two days later when Italy did not enter the war.

Together with the entire 3rd Destroyer Flotilla, the ship was transferred to the Home Fleet in October.

- With her sister ship Ilex, she sank the German submarine U-42 on 13 October after the submarine attempted to sink the freighter SS Stonepool.
- Whilst escorting merchant ships to Barry, Imogen rescued survivors from the ships Louisiane and Bretagne.
- She was refitted at Liverpool between 20 October and 7 November 1939 and then rejoined Home Fleet.
- The following month, the ship came to the aid of the torpedoed battleship Barham off the Butt of Lewis on 28 December.
- With her sister Inglefield and the destroyer Escort, Imogen sank U-63 after it had been spotted by the British submarine Rorqual on 25 February 1940.
- During the Norwegian Campaign, the ship searched unsuccessfully for German ships, escorted ships of Home Fleet and troopships carrying Norwegian Army units from Kirkenes and Alta to Sjøvegan in mid-April.
- In mid-June, she escorted the aircraft carrier Illustrious to Bermuda to work up.

== Sinking ==
Off Duncansby Head during the night of 16 July 1940, Imogen collided with the light cruiser Glasgow in thick fog in the North Sea whilst bound for Scapa Flow. She was badly damaged, caught fire, and sank at position 58°34′N 02°54′W. Glasgow rescued 10 officers and 125 ratings; 19 men were killed in the collision.

== Bibliography ==
- Colledge, J. J.; Warlow, Ben (2006) [1969]. Ships of the Royal Navy: The Complete Record of All Fighting Ships of the Royal Navy from the 15th Century to the Present (3rd Rev ed.). London: Chatham Publishing. ISBN 978-1-86176-281-8. OCLC 67375475.
- English, John (1993). Amazon to Ivanhoe: British Standard Destroyers of the 1930s. Kendal, England: World Ship Society. ISBN 0-905617-64-9.
- Friedman, Norman (2006). British Destroyers & Frigates: The Second World War and After. Annapolis, Maryland: Naval Institute Press. ISBN 1-86176-137-6.
- Haarr, Geirr H. (2010). The Battle for Norway: April-June 1940. Annapolis, Maryland: Naval Institute Press. ISBN 978-1-59114-051-1.
- Hodges, Peter & Friedman, Norman (1979). Destroyer Weapons of World War 2. Greenwich: Conway Maritime Press. ISBN 978-0-85177-137-3.
- Lenton, H. T. (1998). British & Empire Warships of the Second World War. Annapolis, Maryland: Naval Institute Press. ISBN 1-55750-048-7.
- March, Edgar J. (1966). British Destroyers: A History of Development, 1892–1953; Drawn by Admiralty Permission From Official Records & Returns, Ships' Covers & Building Plans. London: Seeley Service. OCLC 164893555.
- Rohwer, Jürgen (2005). Chronology of the War at Sea 1939–1945: The Naval History of World War Two (Third Revised ed.). Annapolis, Maryland: Naval Institute Press. ISBN 1-59114-119-2.
- Whitley, M. J. (1988). Destroyers of World War Two: An International Encyclopedia. Annapolis, Maryland: Naval Institute Press. ISBN 0-87021-326-1.
