= List of shipwrecks in October 1939 =

The list of shipwrecks in October 1939 includes ships sunk, foundered, grounded, or otherwise lost during October 1939.

== 1 October ==
List of shipwrecks: 1 October 1939
Ship	State	Description
Gun	Sweden	World War II: The cargo ship was stopped in the evening of 30 September 30 miles (48 km) northwest of Hanstholm, Denmark by U-3 (Kriegsmarine). The papers of the ship showed that she was carrying contraband. A German scuttling party went aboard while the crew left, but then a British submarine came. The ship was finally sunk by a torpedo from U-3 in the morning of 1 October. The crew were rescued by Dagmar (Denmark).
HNLMS Jan van Gelder	Netherlands	The Jan van Amstel-class minesweeper was damaged by her own naval mines off Terschelling on 1 October 1939. At least five men were killed. After initial repairs at Willemsoord, Den Helder, she received a new stern at Gusto, Schiedam, and was recommissioned on 17 April 1940.
M85	Kriegsmarine	World War II: The Type 1916 minesweeper struck a mine laid by ORP Żbik (Polish Navy) in the Baltic Sea north of Jastarnia, Poland (54°45′N 18°45′E) and sank with the loss of 24 of her 71 crew. The survivors were rescued by M-122 and a number of R boats (all Kriegsmarine).
Suzon	Belgium	World War II: The cargo ship was torpedoed and sunk in the Atlantic Ocean 42 nautical miles (78 km; 48 mi) north west of Ouessant, Finistère, France (48°08′N 7°36′W) by U-35 (Kriegsmarine). Her crew were rescued by HMS Acheron (Royal Navy).

== 2 October ==
List of shipwrecks: 2 October 1939
Ship	State	Description
Baltic	Finland	World War II: The schooner struck a mine and sank in the Kattegat.
ORP Czajka	Polish Navy	World War II: Invasion of Poland: The minesweeper was scuttled at Hel. She was refloated the next day, salvaged and repaired and entered Kriegsmarine service as Westernplatte.
ORP Rybitwa	Polish Navy	World War II: Invasion of Poland: The minesweeper was scuttled at Hel. Later salvaged by the Germans and entered Kriegsmarine service as Rixhoft.
ORP Zuraw	Polish Navy	World War II: Invasion of Poland: The minesweeper was scuttled at Hel. She was refloated the next day, repaired and entered Kriegsmarine service as Oxhoft.

== 3 October ==
List of shipwrecks: 3 October 1939
Ship	State	Description
Diamantis	Greece	World War II: The cargo ship was torpedoed and sunk in the Atlantic Ocean 40 nautical miles (74 km) west of the Skellig Islands, County Kerry, Ireland (49°22′N 6°46′W) by U-35 (Kriegsmarine). All 28 crew were rescued by U-35, and later landed at Ventry, County Kerry.
Høegh Transporter	Norway	World War II: The cargo ship struck a mine off Saint John's Island, Singapore and sank with the loss of one crew member. The ship was later salvaged.

== 4 October ==
List of shipwrecks: 4 October 1939
Ship	State	Description
Glen Farg	United Kingdom	World War II: The coaster was torpedoed and sunk in the Atlantic Ocean 60 nautical miles (110 km) south south west of Sumburgh Head, Shetland Islands (58°52′N 1°31′W) by U-23 (Kriegsmarine) with the loss of one of her 17 crew. Survivors were rescued by HMS Firedrake (Royal Navy).
Mopsa	United Kingdom	World War II: The fishing vessel ran ashore on Aberdeen beach, abreast the Beach Ballroom due to the blackout. The crew of nine were rescued. It was found impossible to free the vessel from the sands, and she was broken up where she lay.

== 5 October ==
List of shipwrecks: 5 October 1939
Ship	State	Description
Marwarri	United Kingdom	World War II: The cargo ship struck a mine laid in the Bristol Channel (51°24′N 3°57′W) by U-32 (Kriegsmarine). Two crew were killed. She was beached in Mumbles Bay. Marwarri was repaired in 1941 and returned to service.
Newton Beech	United Kingdom	World War II: The cargo ship was captured in the Atlantic Ocean south of Freetown, Sierra Leone (9°35′S 6°30′W) by Admiral Graf Spee (Kriegsmarine). Her 34 crew were captured. She was scuttled three days later off the coast of Angola.
Stonegate	United Kingdom	World War II: The cargo ship was shelled and sunk in the Atlantic Ocean 400 nautical miles (740 km) east south east of Bermuda (31°10′N 54°00′W) by Deutschland (Kriegsmarine). Her 39 crew were captured.

== 6 October ==
List of shipwrecks: 6 October 1939
Ship	State	Description
Lochgoil	United Kingdom	World War II: The cargo ship struck a mine laid by U-32 (Kriegsmarine) in the Bristol Channel (5 nautical miles (9.3 km)) off the Scarweather Lightship ( Trinity House) (51°24′N 4°00′W) and was damaged. There were no casualties. She was beached in Mumbles Bay. Lochgoil was on a voyage from Vancouver, British Columbia, Canada to Newport, Monmouthshire. She was refloated on 28 November, repaired and returned to service as Empire Rowan.
Mahratta	United Kingdom	World War II: Convoy HG 1: The cargo ship (6,690 GRT, 1917) ran aground on the Fork Spit, Goodwin Sands, Kent and was wrecked. Her crew were rescued by the hoveller Lady Haig (United Kingdom).

== 7 October ==
List of shipwrecks: 7 October 1939
Ship	State	Description
Ashlea	United Kingdom	World War II: The cargo ship was captured and sunk in the South Atlantic (9°00′S 3°00′W) by Admiral Graf Spee (Kriegsmarine). All 35 crew were captured.
Binnendijk	Netherlands	World War II: The cargo ship struck a mine laid by U-26 (Kriegsmarine) two nautical miles (3.7 km; 2.3 mi) south east of the Shambles Lightship ( Trinity House) and was damaged. She sank one nautical mile (1.9 km; 1.2 mi) north of the lightship (50°32′N 2°20′W) early the next day. All 42 crew survived. The wreck was dispersed on 10 October.
Safe	Netherlands	World War II: The coaster departed from Antwerp, Belgium for Riga but never arrived and was lost without a trace with all seven hands. She probably struck a mine in the North Sea around 10 October.

== 8 October ==
List of shipwrecks: 8 October 1939
Ship	State	Description
U-12	Kriegsmarine	World War II: The Type IIB submarine (275/323 t, 1935) struck a mine and sank in the English Channel off Dover, Kent, United Kingdom (approximately 51°10′N 1°30′E) with the loss of all 27 crew.
Vistula	Sweden	World War II: The cargo ship was torpedoed and sunk in the Atlantic Ocean 35 nautical miles (65 km) north of Muckle Flugga, Shetland Islands, United Kingdom by U-37 (Kriegsmarine) with the loss of nine of her 18 crew.

== 9 October ==
List of shipwrecks: 9 October 1939
Ship	State	Description
Indra	Finland	World War II: The cargo ship (1,999 GRT) was badly damaged by a mine in the North Sea off Terschelling, Friesland, Netherlands. Three crew were killed and 6 of the 20 survivors were wounded. The ship was towed to IJmuiden, Netherlands. Subsequently repaired and returned to service.
Mount Ida	Greece	The cargo ship ran aground on the Ower Bank in the North Sea (53°07′30″N 2°06′30″E). All 29 crew rescued by lifeboat but one later died from injuries sustained during the rescue.
Vera Creina	United Kingdom	The 83.2-foot (25.4 m) steam trawler stranded on Bacton Beach. Refloated 2 days later.

== 10 October ==
List of shipwrecks: 10 October 1939
Ship	State	Description
Huntsman	United Kingdom	World War II: The cargo ship was captured in the South Atlantic (8°30′S 5°15′W) by Admiral Graf Spee (Kriegsmarine). She was scuttled on 17 October at approximately (16°S 17°W).
Marly	Norway	The cargo ship foundered in a cyclone in the Indian Ocean (18°30′N 72°21′E) with the loss of all 46 crew.
Saltaire	United Kingdom	The fishing trawler ran aground at Spurn Point, Yorkshire. Salvage attempts failed and she was declared a total loss.

== 11 October ==
List of shipwrecks: 11 October 1939
Ship	State	Description
Lytham	United Kingdom	The steam hopper (292grt/1894) was sunk in a collision while docked in the River Wyre in dense fog by trawler "William Humphries" (United Kingdom). After sinking she was struck by another trawler. The watchman, only person on board, survived. Refloated the next day.

== 12 October ==
List of shipwrecks: 12 October 1939
Ship	State	Description
Aris	Greece	World War II: The cargo ship was shelled and sunk in the Atlantic Ocean off the west coast of Ireland (53°28′N 14°30′W) by U-37 (Kriegsmarine) with the loss of two crew of her 29 crew. Survivors were rescued by Sicilien (Denmark).
Crane	United States	With no one aboard, the fishing vessel was wrecked at Valdez, Territory of Alaska.
Emile Miguet	France	World War II: Convoy KJ 2S: The tanker straggled behind the convoy. She was torpedoed and damaged in the Atlantic Ocean 190 nautical miles (350 km) south west of the Fastnet Rock (50°15′N 14°50′W) by U-48 (Kriegsmarine) with the loss of two of her crew. Survivors were rescued by Black Hawk (United States). Emile Miguet was scuttled by HMS Imogen (Royal Navy).
Princeton	United States	During a voyage from Haines to Sitka, Territory of Alaska, with three passengers, a crew of three, and a cargo of four tons of potatoes, the motor vessel was wrecked without loss of life during a gale on Little Island (58°32′25″N 135°02′35″W) in Lynn Canal in Southeast Alaska. On 13 October, the Alaska Game Commission motor vessel Bear (United States) rescued all six people who had been aboard Princeton.

== 13 October ==
List of shipwrecks: 13 October 1939
Ship	State	Description
Gressholm	Norway	World War II: The coaster struck a mine and sank in the North Sea 90 nautical miles (170 km) north west of Texel, North Holland, Netherlands (53°55′N 2°55′E) with the loss of three of her eleven crew. Survivors were rescued by Emmi (Finland).
Heronspool	United Kingdom	World War II: Convoy OB 17S: The cargo ship straggled behind the convoy. She was torpedoed and sunk in the Atlantic Ocean 260 nautical miles (480 km) south west of the Fastnet Rock (50°13′N 14°48′W) by U-48 (Kriegsmarine). Her crew were rescued by President Harding (United States).
Louisiane	France	World War II: Convoy OA 17: The cargo ship straggled behind the convoy. She was torpedoed, shelled and sunk in the Atlantic Ocean 240 nautical miles (440 km) south west of the Fastnet Rock (50°14′N 15°05′W) by U-48 (Kriegsmarine) with the loss of a crew member. Survivors were rescued by HMS Imogen (Royal Navy).
U-40	Kriegsmarine	World War II: The Type IXA submarine struck a mine in the English Channel (50°42′N 0°15′E) and sank with the loss of 45 of her 48 crew. Survivors were rescued by HMS Boreas and HMS Brazen (both Royal Navy).
U-42	Kriegsmarine	World War II: The Type IXA submarine (1,016/1,134 t, 1939) was depth charged and sunk in the Atlantic Ocean (49°12′00″N 16°00′00″W) by HMS Imogen and HMS Ilex (both Royal Navy) with the loss of 26 of her 46 crew.

== 14 October ==
List of shipwrecks: 14 October 1939
Ship	State	Description
Bretagne	France	World War II: Convoy KJF 3: The cargo ship was torpedoed and sunk in the Atlantic Ocean 130 nautical miles (240 km) south west of the Fastnet Rock (50°20′N 12°45′W) by U-45 (Kriegsmarine) with the loss of five crew and two passengers. The 341 survivors were rescued by HMS Ilex and HMS Imogen (both Royal Navy).
Lochavon	United Kingdom	World War II: Convoy KJF 3: The cargo liner was torpedoed and damaged in the Atlantic Ocean 230 nautical miles (430 km) south west of the Fastnet Rock by U-45 (Kriegsmarine) with the loss of seven crew. Survivors were rescued by HMS Isis (Royal Navy). Lochavon sank on 16 October.
Lorentz W. Hansen	Norway	World War II: The cargo ship was shelled and sunk in the Atlantic Ocean 420 nautical miles (780 km) east of Newfoundland (49°05′N 43°44′W) by Deutschland (Kriegsmarine) with the loss of three of her 21 crew.
Marion Traber	Germany	The cargo ship ran aground in the Baltic Sea off Nyköping, Sweden and was wrecked.
HMS Royal Oak	Royal Navy	World War II: The Revenge-class battleship (29,150/33,240 t, 1916) was torpedoed and sunk in Scapa Flow, Orkney Islands (at 58°55′N 2°59′W) by U-47 (Kriegsmarine) with the loss of 835 of her 1,260 crew.
Sneaton	United Kingdom	World War II: The cargo ship was torpedoed, shelled and sunk in the Atlantic Ocean 150 nautical miles (280 km) south west of the Fastnet Rock (49°05′N 13°05′W) by U-48 (Kriegsmarine) with the loss of a crew member. Survivors were rescued by Alexandre Andre (Belgium).
U-45	Kriegsmarine	World War II: The Type VIIB submarine was depth charged and sunk in the Atlantic Ocean south west of Ireland (50°58′N 12°57′W) by HMS Icarus, HMS Inglefield, HMS Intrepid and HMS Ivanhoe (all Royal Navy) with the loss of all 38 crew.

== 15 October ==
List of shipwrecks: 15 October 1939
Ship	State	Description
City of York	United Kingdom	The 116.8-foot (35.6 m), 202-ton steam trawler ran onto rocks off Tolsta Head, Isle of Lewis (58°12′N 06°10′W). Crew made it to land in her boat.
Vermont	France	World War II: The cargo ship was torpedoed and sunk in the Atlantic Ocean 360 nautical miles (670 km; 410 mi) south west of the Fastnet Rock (48°01′N 17°22′W) by U-37 (Kriegsmarine) with the loss of two of her 45 crew. Survivors were rescued by HMS Inglefield (Royal Navy).
Wanja	Sweden	The cargo ship ran aground off Sanday, Orkney Islands, United Kingdom and was wrecked. All 26 crew were rescued.

== 16 October ==
List of shipwrecks: 16 October 1939
Ship	State	Description
Halle	Germany	World War II: The blockade running cargo ship was intercepted in the Atlantic Ocean south west of Dakar, Senegal by Duguay-Trouin (French Navy) and was scuttled by her crew.
Ionic Star	United Kingdom	The cargo ship ran aground in Liverpool Bay off Southport, Lancashire. There were no casualties. Her cargo was later salvaged, but the ship was a total loss.

== 17 October ==
List of shipwrecks: 17 October 1939
Ship	State	Description
City of Mandalay	United Kingdom	World War II: Convoy HG 3: The cargo ship was torpedoed and sunk in the Atlantic Ocean 360 nautical miles (670 km) west north west of Cape Finisterre, Spain (44°57′N 13°36′W) by U-46 (Kriegsmarine) with the loss of two of the 80 people on board. Survivors were rescued by Independence Hall (United States) and Skudd IV (Norway)
Clan Chisholm	United Kingdom	World War II: The cargo ship (7,256 GRT, 1937) was torpedoed and sunk in the Atlantic Ocean 150 nautical miles (280 km) north north west of Cape Finisterre (approximately 44°57′N 13°40′W) by U-48 (Kriegsmarine) with the loss of four of her 78 crew. Survivors were rescued by Independence Hall (United States).
Huntsman	United Kingdom	World War II: The cargo ship was sunk with demolition charges in the South Atlantic (16°00′S 17°00′W) by Admiral Graf Spee (Kriegsmarine), that had captured her on 10 October. Her crew survived. (Look 10/10/1939)
HMS Iron Duke	Royal Navy	World War II: The Iron Duke-class battleship (21,250/24,000 t, 1914) was attacked by four Junkers Ju 88 aircraft of 1 Staffeln, Kampfgeschwader 30, Luftwaffe at Scapa Flow and was beached to prevent her sinking. Twenty-five crew were killed. She was later repaired and returned to service.
V 804 Skolpenbank	Kriegsmarine	World War II: The vorpostenboot struck a mine and sank in the North Sea off Schiermonnikoog, Friesland, Netherlands.
Yorkshire	United Kingdom	World War II: Convoy HG 3: She was a cargo liner torpedoed and sunk in the Atlantic Ocean 700 nautical miles (1,300 km) west of Bordeaux, Gironde, France (44°52′N 14°31′W) by U-37 (Kriegsmarine) with the loss of 58 of the 281 people on board. Survivors were rescued by Independence Hall (United States).

== 18 October ==
List of shipwrecks: 18 October 1939
Ship	State	Description
Gonzenheim	Germany	World War II: The cargo ship was intercepted in the Denmark Strait (63°25′N 12°00′W) by HMS Rawalpindi (Royal Navy) and was scuttled by her crew.

== 19 October ==
List of shipwrecks: 19 October 1939
Ship	State	Description
City of London	United Kingdom	The coaster collided in the River Thames with a Dutch vessel and was beached at World's End, Tilbury, Essex.
Martha	United States	The 30-fishing vessel was wrecked on either Walrus Island (56°01′40″N 160°50′00″W) or Deer Island near Nelson Lagoon, Territory of Alaska, after a storm carried away her rudder. Her four crew survived.
ShCh-424	Soviet Navy	The Shchuka-class submarine collided in Kola Bay with the fishing trawler RT-43 (Soviet Union) and sank with the loss of 34 of her 44 crew.

== 20 October ==
List of shipwrecks: 20 October 1939
Ship	State	Description
Azariah	United Kingdom	The Thames barge sank in the North Sea off Burnham-on-Crouch, Essex. (Look 29 September 1939)
Gustaf Adolf	Sweden	World War II: The cargo ship was torpedoed, shelled and sunk in the North Sea 50 nautical miles (93 km) north of Sullom Voe, Shetland Islands (61°00′N 0°48′E) by U-34 (Kriegsmarine). Survivors were rescued by Biscaya (Norway).
Sea Venture	United Kingdom	World War II: The cargo ship was torpedoed, shelled and sunk in the North Sea east of the Shetland Islands (60°50′N 0°15′E) by U-34 (Kriegsmarine). All 25 crew were rescued by the Lerwick lifeboat.

== 21 October ==
List of shipwrecks: 21 October 1939
Ship	State	Description
Capitaine Edmond Laborie	France	World War II: The cargo ship struck a mine and sank in the North Sea 1.5 nautical miles (2.8 km) east of the Inner Dowsing Lightship ( Trinity House) (53°19′50″N 0°38′20″E). Her crew were rescued by the Gorleston Lifeboat Louise Stephens ( Royal National Lifeboat Institution). The wreck was dispersed by explosives.
Deodata	Norway	World War II: The tanker struck a mine and sank in the North Sea off Great Yarmouth, Norfolk (53°21′00″N 0°36′09″E). Her crew were rescued by the Gorleston Lifeboat Louise Stephens ( Royal National Lifeboat Institution). The wreck was subsequently dispersed by explosives.
Lake Neuchatel	United Kingdom	World War II: The special service ship was scuttled as a blockship in Kirk Sound, Scapa Flow, Orkney Islands. She was refloated in June 1948 and scrapped.
New Mathilde	United Kingdom	The cargo ship foundered in the South China Sea 3 nautical miles (5.6 km) off Kwangchowan, French Indo-China.
Orsa	United Kingdom	World War II: The cargo ship struck a mine and sank in the North Sea 15 nautical miles (28 km) off Flamborough Head, Yorkshire with the loss of 16 of her 20 crew. Survivors were rescued by HMS Woolston (Royal Navy.
Poseidon	Germany	World War II: The cargo ship was captured in the Denmark Strait (67°08′N 21°18′W by HMS Scotstoun (Royal Navy). She was taken in tow by HMS Transylvania (Royal Navy) on 25 October but scuttled by her two days later after the towline parted in a blizzard.
V 701 Este	Kriegsmarine	World War II: The vorpostenboot struck a mine and sank in the Baltic Sea off Møn, Denmark with the loss of 70 of her 75 crew.

== 22 October ==
List of shipwrecks: 22 October 1939
Ship	State	Description
Trevanion	United Kingdom	World War II: The cargo ship was shelled and sunk in the South Atlantic (19°40′S 4°02′W) by Admiral Graf Spee (Kriegsmarine).
Whitemantle	United Kingdom	World War II: The cargo ship struck a mine and sank in the North Sea 5 to 6 nautical miles (9.3 to 11.1 km) off the Withernsea Lighthouse, Yorkshire with the loss of fourteen of her crew.

== 23 October ==
List of shipwrecks: 23 October 1939
Ship	State	Description
Albania	Sweden	World War II: The cargo ship struck a mine and sank in the North Sea 4 nautical miles (7.4 km) off the Humber Lightship ( Trinity House) (53°37′07″N 0°20′00″E) with the loss of two of her crew. Survivors were rescued by Channel Fisher (United Kingdom).
Emmy Friederich	Germany	World War II: The tanker was intercepted in the Yucatán Channel, Gulf of Mexico by HMS Caradoc (Royal Navy) and HMCS Saguenay (Royal Canadian Navy). She was scuttled by her crew.

== 24 October ==
List of shipwrecks: 24 October 1939
Ship	State	Description
Izan Maru	Japan	The cargo ship was driven ashore at Okha, Soviet Union. She was refloated on 24 January 1941 and towed in to Iloilo, Philippines. She was declared a constructive total loss.
Konstantinos Hadjipateras	Greece	World War II: The cargo ship struck a mine and sank in the North Sea off the Inner Dowsing Lightship ( Trinity House) (53°20′57″N 0°36′54″E) with the loss of four of her 31 crew. Survivors were rescued by the Gorleston Lifeboat Louise Stephens ( Royal National Lifeboat Institution). The wreck was dispersed by explosives in July 1947.
Ledbury	United Kingdom	World War II: The cargo ship was shelled and sunk in the Atlantic Ocean 100 nautical miles (190 km) west of Gibraltar (36°01′N 7°22′W) by U-37 (Kriegsmarine), while she was rescuing survivors of Menin Ridge (United Kingdom). All 31 crew were rescued by Crown City (United States).
Menin Ridge	United Kingdom	World War II: The cargo ship was torpedoed and sunk 100 nautical miles (190 km) west of Gibraltar (36°01′N 7°22′W) by U-37 (Kriegsmarine) with the loss of twenty of her 25 crew. Survivors were rescued by Crown City (United States).
Tafna	United Kingdom	World War II: The cargo ship was torpedoed sunk in the Atlantic Ocean 84 nautical miles (156 km) west of Gibraltar (35°44′N 7°23′W) by U-37 (Kriegsmarine) with the loss of two of her 33 crew. Survivors were rescued by HMS Douglas (Royal Navy).

== 25 October ==
List of shipwrecks: 25 October 1939
Ship	State	Description
Amvrakia	Greece	The cargo liner ran aground on Euboea Island and was wrecked. Seven passengers died.
U-16	Kriegsmarine	World War II: The Type IIB submarine was depth charged and sunk in the English Channel off Dover, Kent, United Kingdom by HMS Cayton Wyke and HMS Puffin (both Royal Navy) with the loss of all 28 crew.

== 27 October ==
List of shipwrecks: 27 October 1939
Ship	State	Description
Bronte	United Kingdom	World War II: Convoy OB 25: The cargo ship was torpedoed and damaged in the Atlantic Ocean west of Ireland (49°30′N 12°15′W) by U-34 (Kriegsmarine) She was taken in tow by Englishman (United Kingdom) but was scuttled on 30 October by HMS Esk (Royal Navy) at 50°07′N 10°36′W. There were no casualties.
USC&GS Mikawe	United States Coast and Geodetic Survey	The hydrographic survey launch was destroyed by fire in a fueling incident at Norfolk, Virginia.

== 28 October ==
List of shipwrecks: 28 October 1939
Ship	State	Description
Lynx II	United Kingdom	World War II: The fishing trawler was shelled and sunk in the Atlantic Ocean north west of the Orkney Islands (59°50′N 4°20′W) by U-59 (Kriegsmarine). There were no casualties. The crew, along with all survivors from St. Nidan (United Kingdom) were rescued by Lady Hogarth (United Kingdom).
St. Nidan	United Kingdom	World War II: The fishing trawler was torpedoed and sunk in the Atlantic Ocean north west of the Orkney Islands (59°50′N 4°20′W) by U-59 (Kriegsmarine). Her crew were rescued by Lynx II (United Kingdom).

== 29 October ==
List of shipwrecks: 29 October 1939
Ship	State	Description
Malabar	United Kingdom	World War II: Convoy HX 5A: The cargo ship was torpedoed and sunk in the Atlantic Ocean 60 miles (97 km) west north west of Bishop Rock (49°57′N 7°37′W) by U-34 (Kriegsmarine) with the loss of five of her 75 crew. Survivors were rescued by HMS Grafton (Royal Navy).
Varangmalm	Norway	World War II: The cargo ship struck a mine and sank in the North Sea (53°50′N 0°17′E) with the loss of a crew member. Survivors were rescued by the fishing trawler Conida (United Kingdom). The wreck was subsequently dispersed by explosives.

== 30 October ==
List of shipwrecks: 30 October 1939
Ship	State	Description
Cairnmona	United Kingdom	World War II: Convoy HX 5B: The cargo ship was torpedoed and damaged in the North Sea off Rattray Head, Aberdeenshire (57°38′N 1°45′W) by U-13 (Kriegsmarine) with the loss of three of her 44 crew. She was taken in tow by Englishman (United Kingdom) but sank later that day. Survivors were rescued by HMT River Lossie (Royal Navy).
Juno	Finland	World War II: The cargo ship struck a mine and sank in the North Sea off Withernsea, Yorkshire (53°40′N 0°17′E) with the loss of all six crew.
HMS Northern Rover	Royal Navy	World War II: The 188.1-foot (57.3 m), 655-ton naval trawler/armed boarding vessel was torpedoed and sunk in the Atlantic Ocean 100 miles (160 km) west of Sumburgh Head, the Shetlands by U-59 (Kriegsmarine) with the loss of all 27 crew.
Thrasyvoulos	Greece	World War II: The cargo ship was torpedoed and sunk in the Atlantic Ocean 160 nautical miles (300 km) west of Ireland (49°25′N 11°18′W) by U-37 (Kriegsmarine) with the loss of 22 of her 28 crew. Survivors were rescued by Havmøy (Norway).

== 31 October ==
List of shipwrecks: 31 October 1939
Ship	State	Description
Baoulé	France	World War II: Convoy 20K: The cargo ship was shelled and sunk in the Atlantic Ocean 45 nautical miles (83 km) west north west of A Coruña, Spain (43°48′N 9°08′W) by U-25 (Kriegsmarine) with the loss of 13 of her 46 crew.
