= HMS Express (H61) =

E-class british destroyer

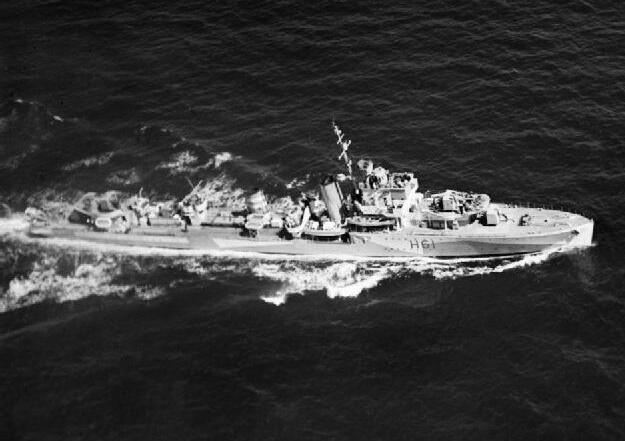
- Aerial view of Express, November 1942

History

United Kingdom
- Name: Express
- Ordered: 1 November 1932
- Builder: Swan Hunter, Tyne and Wear
- Launched: 29 May 1934
- Commissioned: 2 November 1934
- Identification: Pennant number: H61
- Motto: "Celeriter"; ("Quickly")
- Fate: Transferred to Canada, 15 June 1943

Canada
- Name: Gatineau
- Namesake: Gatineau River
- Acquired: 15 June 1943 (given to Canada)
- Commissioned: 3 June 1943
- Decommissioned: 10 January 1946
- Stricken: 1 April 1947
- Honours and awards: Atlantic 1943–44; Normandy 1944
- Fate: Scuttled as a breakwater, 1948

General characteristics (as built)
- Class & type: E-class destroyer
- Displacement: 1,405 long tons (1,428 t) (standard)
- Length: 329 ft (100.3 m) o/a
- Beam: 33 ft 3 in (10.13 m)
- Draught: 12 ft 6 in (3.81 m) (deep)
- Installed power: 3 × Admiralty 3-drum boilers; 36,000 shp (27,000 kW)
- Propulsion: 2 × shafts; 2 × geared steam turbines
- Speed: 35.5 knots (65.7 km/h; 40.9 mph)
- Range: 6,350 nmi (11,760 km; 7,310 mi) at 15 knots (28 km/h; 17 mph)
- Complement: 145
- Sensors & processing systems: ASDIC
- Armament: 4 × single 4.7 in (120 mm) guns; 2 × quadruple 0.5 in (12.7 mm) machine guns; 2 × quadruple 21 in (533 mm) torpedo tubes; 20 × depth charges, 1 rack and 2 throwers; 60 mines

HMS Express was an E-class minelaying destroyer built for the Royal Navy in the early 1930s. Although assigned to the Home Fleet upon completion, the ship was attached to the Mediterranean Fleet in 1935–36 during the Abyssinia Crisis. During the Spanish Civil War of 1936–1939, she spent considerable time in Spanish waters, enforcing the arms blockade imposed by Britain and France on both sides of the conflict.

Express spent most of the first year of World War II laying minefields in British, Dutch and German waters. She participated in the evacuation of Allied soldiers from Dunkirk in May–June 1940, but resumed minelaying afterwards. The ship was one of five British destroyers that inadvertently entered a German minefield off the Dutch coast a few months later, leading to the sinking of two destroyers and Express having her bow blown off, incapacitating her for over a year of repairs. Two months after returning to duty, Express escorted the battleship Prince of Wales and the battlecruiser Repulse (Force Z) to Singapore in late 1941, in an unsuccessful attempt to deter Japanese aggression against British possessions in the Far East. She escorted the capital ships in an attempt to intercept landings in British Malaya in December and rescued their survivors after they were sunk by Japanese bombers. Express was then assigned convoy escort duties in and around Singapore and the Dutch East Indies under the control of American-British-Dutch-Australian Command (ABDACOM) as the Japanese advanced. She escaped from the East Indies and rejoined the main body of the Eastern Fleet in the Indian Ocean. The ship played a minor role in Battle of Madagascar as she screened an aircraft carrier during the late stages of the campaign in 1942.

Express returned home in early 1943 to begin conversion into an escort destroyer. Upon its completion in June, the ship was transferred to the Royal Canadian Navy (RCN) and renamed Gatineau. She was assigned to convoy escort duties with the Mid-Ocean Escort Force and participated in sinking a German submarine in March 1944. Gatineau was transferred to Northern Ireland in preparation in May for the Invasion of Normandy and was sent to Canada in July to begin a lengthy refit. The ship was only operational for a few months before the war ended in May 1945 and she returned to Canada shortly afterwards. Gatineau was paid off in early 1946 and was sold the following year. The ship became part of a breakwater on the coast of British Columbia in 1948.

== Description ==
The E-class ships were slightly improved versions of the preceding D class. They displaced 1,405 long tons (1,428 t) at standard load and 1,940 long tons (1,970 t) at deep load. The ships had an overall length of 329 feet (100.3 m), a beam of 33 feet 3 inches (10.1 m) and a draught of 12 feet 6 inches (3.8 m). They were powered by two Parsons geared steam turbines, each driving one propeller shaft, using steam provided by three Admiralty three-drum boilers. The turbines developed a total of 36,000 shaft horsepower (27,000 kW) and gave a maximum speed of 35.5 knots (65.7 km/h; 40.9 mph). The ships carried a maximum of 470 long tons (480 t) of fuel oil that gave them a range of 6,350 nautical miles (11,760 km; 7,310 mi) at 15 knots (28 km/h; 17 mph). Their complement was 145 officers and ratings.

The ships mounted four 4.7-inch (120 mm) Mark IX guns in single mounts, designated 'A', 'B', 'X' and 'Y' from front to rear. For anti-aircraft (AA) defence, they had two quadruple mounts for the Vickers 0.5 in (12.7 mm) AA machinegun. The E class was fitted with two above-water quadruple torpedo tube mounts for 21-inch (533 mm) torpedoes. One depth charge rail and two throwers were fitted; 20 depth charges were originally carried, but this increased to 35 shortly after the war began. To compensate for the weight of her 60 Mark XIV mines and their rails, two of Express's 4.7-inch guns, their ammunition, both sets of torpedo tubes, her Two-Speed Destroyer Sweep (TSDS) minesweeping paravanes, and her large boats and their davits had to be removed. She was given small sponsons at the stern to ensure smooth delivery of her mines.

=== Wartime modifications ===
Express had her rear torpedo tubes replaced by a 12-pounder (76 mm) AA gun in July 1940. In February–June 1943, she was converted into an escort destroyer. A Type 286 short-range surface search radar was fitted and a Type 271 target indication radar was installed above the bridge, replacing the director-control tower and rangefinder. The ship also received a HF/DF radio direction finder mounted on a pole mainmast. Her short-range AA armament was augmented by four 20 mm (0.8 in) Oerlikon guns and the .50-calibre machine guns were replaced by a pair of Oerlikons. A split Hedgehog anti-submarine spigot mortar was installed abreast 'A' gun and stowage for 60 depth charges provided; 'Y' gun and the 12-pounder had to be removed to compensate for their weight. By the end of the war, a Type 277 radar had replaced the Type 271, and the Type 286 had been superseded by a Type 291.

== Construction and career ==
Express, the eighth ship of that name to serve with the Royal Navy, was ordered 1 November 1932, from Swan Hunter & Wigham Richardson at Wallsend under the 1931 Naval Programme, for use as a destroyer that could quickly be converted for use as a minelayer when required. She was laid down 24 March 1932, and launched on 29 May 1934. The ship was commissioned on 2 November 1934, at a total cost of £247,279, excluding government-furnished equipment like the armament.

Express and her sister ships were assigned to the 5th Destroyer Flotilla (DF) of the Home Fleet. She remained at home for the next nine months while her armament was adjusted at Sheerness Dockyard from 13 December to 5 January 1935. The ship was attached to the Mediterranean Fleet, together with most of the rest of her flotilla, beginning in September 1935, during the Abyssinian Crisis, and returned home in March 1936. Upon her arrival, Express was refitted at Portsmouth Dockyard 23 March–4 May. The ship was then temporarily assigned to Gibraltar for the next two months as tensions rose before the beginning of the Spanish Civil War. She then spent the rest of the year at home, before patrolling Spanish waters in the Mediterranean in January–March 1937, enforcing the edicts of the Non-Intervention Committee. After a brief refit, Express then conducted minelaying trials for two months and was refitted again at Portsmouth between 9 August–2 October. Shortly afterwards, the ship had a fire in her forward boiler room that badly damaged her electrical cabling; she was repaired at Gibraltar from 24 October to 3 December. Express spent most of 1938 at home other than one period in Spanish waters, where she was based out of Gibraltar. During her time at Portsmouth, the ship operated as a minelayer from 15 August to 4 October, before beginning a refit there on 21 November that lasted to 16 January 1939. Upon its completion, Express returned to Gibraltar for several months. After returning to the UK, the ship escorted the President of France, Albert François Lebrun, across the English Channel on 21 March en route to his state visit to the UK. She was earmarked for conversion to a boy's and anti-aircraft training ship in June, but shortages of crewmen put paid to the idea. Express was present at the Reserve Fleet Review on 5 August.

=== World War II ===
Shortly after the outbreak of war in September, Express joined her sister Esk at Immingham on the North Sea on 8 September, operating under the direct control of the Commander-in-chief, Home Fleet, Admiral Sir Charles Forbes. The two destroyers made their first minelaying sortie in the Heligoland Bight on the night of 9/10 September. and did it again a week later without being detected. They then reverted to ordinary duties for the next several months, before beginning to lay defensive minefields off the English coast in November. On 12 December, the Admiralty formed the 20th Destroyer Flotilla with Express as the flotilla leader; the other ships assigned were Esk and the newly converted destroyers, HMS Intrepid and Ivanhoe. The four destroyers laid 240 mines off the mouth of the Ems on the night of 17–18 December and the two sisters then began a refit at Portsmouth.

Express and Esk began to lay more defensive minefields in February 1940, often with the large auxiliary minelayers Princess Victoria and Teviot Bank. On the night of 2/3 March, the sisters were joined by the newly converted destroyers HMS Icarus and HMS Impulsive in laying mines near Horns Reef, in the Heligoland Bight, that sank the German submarine U-44 in March, and later the submarines U-50, U-1, and U-25. After resuming defensive minelaying later that month, Express was damaged in a collision with the fishing trawler Manx Admiral off Kinnaird Head on 23 March and was under repair until 24 April.

On the night of 9/10 May, Express, Esk and Intrepid laid another minefield in the Heligoland Bight and were diverted on their return voyage to escort Princess Victoria as she mined Dutch waters off Egmond the following night after the Germans invaded the Netherlands on 10 May. This began an intensive series of minelaying sorties in Dutch waters during the rest of the month that saw three German minesweepers sunk on 26 July. The minelaying, however, was interrupted at the end of the month by the need to evacuate the British Expeditionary Force from Dunkirk. On 29 May, Express towed the disabled destroyer Jaguar clear of a wreck in Dunkirk harbour and transferred many of her evacuees aboard before she could repair her engines later that day. The following day, Rear-Admiral Frederic Wake-Walker, commanding the ships involved in the evacuation, briefly hoisted his flag aboard her. She was lightly damaged by bomb splinters on 31 May, but continued to ferry soldiers back to England. The ship and the destroyer Shikari were the last ships to leave Dunkirk with troops on 4 June when the evacuation ended. She brought out 3,419 troops over the course of the operation.

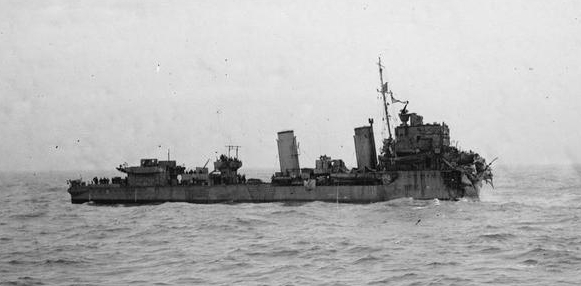
Express after her bow was blown off by a mine, 1 September 1940

The ships of the 20th Flotilla resumed minelaying operations on 15 June, although most of these over the next several months were defensive in nature. On the evening of 31 August 1940, Express, Esk, Icarus, Intrepid, and Ivanhoe departed Immingham to lay an offensive minefield off Texel, with cover provided by three destroyers of the 5th DF. At 23:07 it became clear that the ships of the 20th Flotilla had entered a German minefield when Express struck a mine abreast 'B' gun, losing her entire bow up to the bridge. The detonation killed 4 officers and 54 ratings; one officer and 7 crewmen were later rescued by the Germans. Esk and Ivanhoe, the closest ships to Express, closed to render assistance, while the other two destroyers turned hard to starboard and retraced their route to exit the minefield, according to standing orders. Five minutes after the first mine detonated, Esk's bow struck a mine and she came to a stop. Five minutes later Ivanhoe struck another mine that badly damaged her bow. At about 23:20, Esk struck another mine amidships that detonated her magazines. By 01:40, Express had managed to raise steam again and steamed astern to minimise the pressure of the water on her shored-up bulkheads.

The Admiralty dispatched nine motor torpedo boats (MTB) to go to the assistance of Express and Ivanhoe once they had been notified of the incident by Intrepid and ordered that the destroyers of the 5th DF were not to enter the minefield. Captain Louis Mountbatten of the 5th DF complied until he received the report of a Royal Air Force Lockheed Hudson bomber that had spotted the two damaged destroyers about 07:00 about 25 miles (40 km) east of his position. The MTBs reached the ships first, around 08:00, and evacuated all of Express's crew. Mountbatten's destroyers spotted Express around 08:40, and Kelvin took her in tow, stern first, twenty minutes later. The tow cable, however, fouled one of Kelvin's propellers and had to be cut. Jupiter then took over the tow. The threat of aerial attack at 19:45 forced Jupiter to slip her tow and allow one of the attending tugboats to take over the task. Express finally arrived at Hull at 17:30 on 2 September 1940. The ship was under repair at Chatham Dockyard until 4 October 1941.

==== To the Far East ====
Express was ordered to escort the battleship Prince of Wales to the Far East with her sister Electra where the ships would form the nucleus of a new Eastern Fleet intended to deter Japanese aggression. The trio departed Greenock on 25 October and arrived at Colombo, Ceylon, on 28 November. The following day, the destroyers Encounter and Jupiter joined them from the Mediterranean Fleet as did the battlecruiser Repulse. The force then set course for Singapore, where they arrived on 2 December.

===== Force Z =====
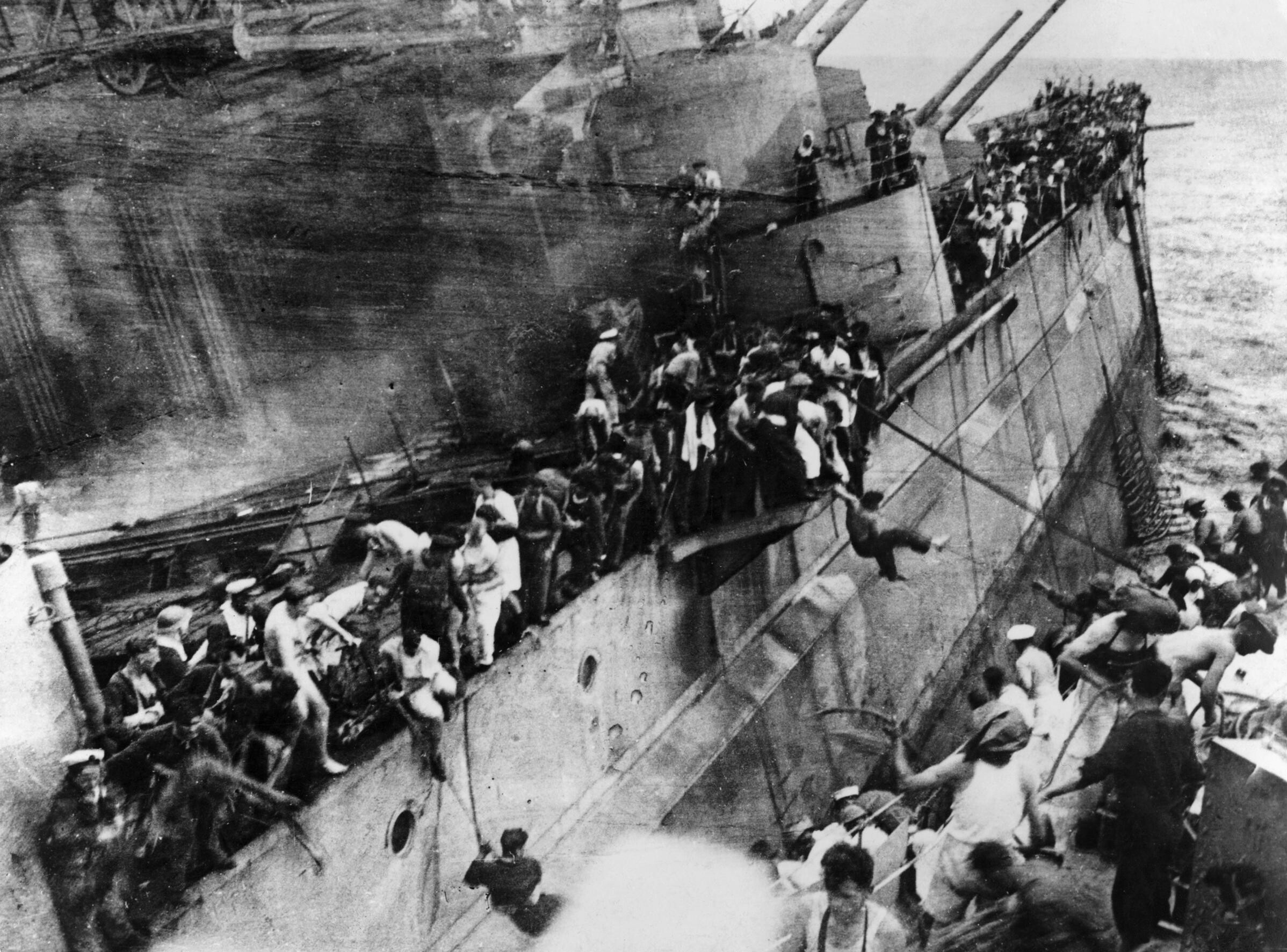
The crew of the sinking HMS Prince of Wales evacuating to Express (lower right), 10 December 1941

After receiving the reports of the attack on Pearl Harbor and landings in Malaya by the Japanese, Force Z put to sea in the late afternoon of 8 December in an attempt to intercept the invasion convoys. This consisted of Prince of Wales and Repulse, escorted by four destroyers, Electra, Express, Tenedos, and the Australian Vampire. The ships were spotted during the afternoon of 9 December by the Japanese submarine I-65, and floatplanes from several Japanese cruisers spotted the British ships later that afternoon and shadowed them until dark. Admiral Sir Tom Phillips decided to cancel the operation as the Japanese were now alerted. Force Z turned back during the evening, after having tried to deceive the Japanese that they were heading to Singora. At 00:50 on 10 December Admiral Philips received a signal of enemy landings at Kuantan and correspondingly altered course so that he would arrive shortly after dawn.

The crew of the Japanese submarine I-58 spotted Force Z at 02:20, reported their position, and fired five torpedoes, all of which missed. Based on this report the Japanese launched 11 reconnaissance aircraft before dawn to locate Force Z. Several hours later 86 bombers from the 22nd Air Flotilla based in Saigon were launched carrying bombs or torpedoes. Once the British ships reached Kuantan around 07:50, Express was sent to investigate the area, but there was nothing to find. The crew of a Mitsubishi G3M "Nell" reconnaissance bomber spotted the British at 10:15 and radioed in several reports; the first bombers arrived less than an hour later. They ignored the destroyers and sank both Prince of Wales and Repulse by 13:20. Electra and Vampire moved in to rescue survivors of Repulse, while Express rescued survivors of the Prince of Wales. All told, the three destroyers rescued over 2,081 survivors.

Afterwards, Express escorted the minelayers Teviot Bank, Kung Wo, and the Dutch Willem van der Zaan as they laid defensive minefield around Singapore. On 24 December, she laid 18 mines of her own to block Japanese access to the harbour of Penang. The ship also escorted convoys to and from Singapore and the Dutch East Indies. Express was transferred to the China Force, which controlled all convoys in the ABDACOM area, on 20 January 1942. Despite a boiler room fire on 6 February that damaged some of her electrical cabling and fuel tanks, the ship remained on escort duties until she arrived at Simonstown, South Africa, on 25 April to begin repairs that lasted until 26 June.

Express was assigned to the 12th DF of the Eastern Fleet in the Indian Ocean after her repairs were completed. She escorted the aircraft carrier Illustrious on 10 September as her aircraft supported the landings at Majunga that were intended to facilitate the complete occupation of Madagascar and then returned home in February 1943 to be converted into an escort destroyer.

==== Canadian service ====
The conversion was completed on 2 June; the following day, Express was loaned to the Royal Canadian Navy and commissioned with the name Gatineau. On 15 June, the ship was given to Canada where she was assigned to Escort Group C3 and assigned to the Mid-Ocean Escort Force for convoy duties in the North Atlantic. While protecting Convoy HX 280, she helped to sink the German submarine U-744 on 6 March 1944. Two months later, Gatineau was transferred to the 11th Escort Group, based at Derry, to prepare for the invasion of France (Operation Overlord) by patrolling British waters. She sailed to Halifax in July to begin a lengthy refit that lasted from 3 August to 16 February 1945. The ship spent March working up at the Anti-Submarine Training School at Tobermory before beginning anti-submarine patrols in British waters until the end of the war in May. Gatineau returned to Canada in June and was refitted in Halifax 11–19 July before she was transferred to the West Coast. The ship was paid off into reserve at Esquimalt on 10 January 1946 and struck from the Navy List on 1 April 1947. Gatineau was then sold to Capital Iron & Steel Metals of Victoria, British Columbia; her hulk was used to form a breakwater at Royston, British Columbia (49°39′14.26″N 124°56′53.74″W) in 1948. She remained visible for many years, but little remained of her hull by 2004.

== Bibliography ==
- Colledge, J. J.; Warlow, Ben (2006) [1969]. Ships of the Royal Navy: The Complete Record of All Fighting Ships of the Royal Navy from the 15th Century to the Present (3rd Rev ed.). London: Chatham Publishing. ISBN 978-1-86176-281-8. OCLC 67375475.
- Admiralty Historical Section (2000). The Evacuation from Dunkirk: Operation Dynamo 26 May–4 June 1940. Naval Staff Histories. London: Frank Cass. ISBN 0-7146-5120-6.
- English, John (1993). Amazon to Ivanhoe: British Standard Destroyers of the 1930s. Kendal, UK: World Ship Society. ISBN 0-905617-64-9.
- Friedman, Norman (2009). British Destroyers From Earliest Days to the Second World War. Annapolis, Maryland: Naval Institute Press. ISBN 978-1-59114-081-8.
- Gill, G. Hermon (1957). "Chapter 14: South–West Pacific Area" (PDF). Australia in the War of 1939–1945: Series Two Navy: Volume I: The Royal Australian Navy, 1939–1942. Canberra, Australia: Australian War Memorial. pp. 484–512. OCLC 848228.
- Gill, G. Hermon (1957). "Chapter 15: ABDA and ANZAC" (PDF). Australia in the War of 1939–1945: Series Two Navy: Volume I: The Royal Australian Navy, 1939–1942. Canberra, Australia: Australian War Memorial. pp. 513–72. OCLC 848228.
- Haarr, Geirr H. (2010). The Battle for Norway: April–June 1940. Annapolis, Maryland: Naval Institute Press. ISBN 978-1-59114-051-1.
- Haarr, Geirr H. (2013). The Gathering Storm: The Naval War in Northern Europe September 1939 – April 1940. Annapolis, Maryland: Naval Institute Press. ISBN 978-1-59114-331-4.
- Haarr, Geirr H. (2009). The German Invasion of Norway, April 1940. Annapolis, Maryland: Naval Institute Press. ISBN 978-1-59114-310-9.
- James, Rick (2004), The Ghost Ships of Royston, Vancouver: Underwater Archaeological Society of British Columbia, ISBN 0-9695010-9-9
- Lenton, H. T. (1998). British & Empire Warships of the Second World War. Annapolis, Maryland: Naval Institute Press. ISBN 1-55750-048-7.
- MacPherson, Ken & Barrie, Ron (2002). The Ships of Canada's Naval Forces 1910–2002. St. Catharines, Ontario: Vanwell. ISBN 1-55125-072-1.
- Middlebrook, Martin & Mahoney, Patrick (2004). The Sinking of the Prince of Wales and Repulse: The End of the Battleship Era. Barnsley: Leo Cooper. ISBN 978-1-84415-075-5.
- Rohwer, Jürgen (2005). Chronology of the War at Sea 1939–1945: The Naval History of World War Two (Third Revised ed.). Annapolis, Maryland: Naval Institute Press. ISBN 1-59114-119-2.
- Smith, Peter C. (2005). Into the Minefields: British Destroyer Minelaying 1918 - 1980. Barnsley, UK: Pen & Sword Books. ISBN 1-84415-271-5.
- Shores, Christopher; Cull, Brian & Izawa, Yasuho (1992). Bloody Shambles. Vol. I: The Drift to War to the Fall of Singapore. London: Grub Street. ISBN 0-948817-50-X.
- Stephen, Martin (1988). Sea Battles in Close-Up: World War 2. Annapolis, Maryland: Naval Institute Press. ISBN 0-87021-556-6.
- Whitley, M. J. (2000). Destroyers of World War Two: An International Encyclopedia. London: Cassell & Co. ISBN 1-85409-521-8.
- Winser, John de D. (1999). B.E.F. Ships Before, At and After Dunkirk. Gravesend, UK: World Ship Society. ISBN 0-905617-91-6.
