= HMS Esk (H15) =

British E-class destroyer

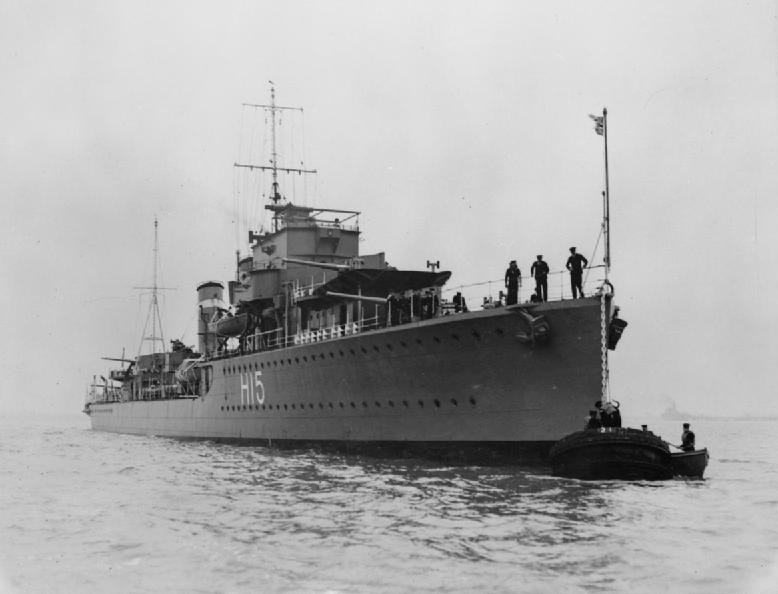
- Esk in 1935

History

United Kingdom
- Name: HMS Esk
- Ordered: 1 November 1932
- Builder: Swan Hunter, Tyne and Wear, United Kingdom
- Cost: £247,279
- Laid down: 24 March 1933
- Launched: 19 March 1934
- Commissioned: 28 September 1934
- Identification: Pennant number H15
- Motto: Flucto sed affluo; ("I flow but flow onwards")
- Honours and awards: Atlantic 1939; Norway 1940; Dunkirk 1940
- Fate: Sunk by mine, 31 August 1940
- Badge: A Field wavy of nine Silver and Blue

General characteristics
- Class & type: E-class destroyer
- Displacement: 1,405 long tons (1,428 t) (standard); 1,940 long tons (1,970 t) (deep load)
- Length: 329 ft (100.3 m) o/a
- Beam: 33 ft 3 in (10.13 m)
- Draught: 12 ft 6 in (3.81 m) (deep)
- Installed power: 36,000 shp (26,800 kW); 3 × Admiralty 3-drum boilers
- Propulsion: 2 × shafts; 2 × Parsons geared steam turbines
- Speed: 35.5 knots (65.7 km/h; 40.9 mph)
- Range: 6,350 nmi (11,760 km; 7,310 mi) at 15 knots (28 km/h; 17 mph)
- Complement: 145
- Sensors & processing systems: ASDIC
- Armament: 4 × single QF 4.7-inch (120 mm) Mk IX guns; 2 × quadruple 0.5-inch (12.7 mm) machine guns; 2 × quadruple 21-inch (533 mm) torpedo tubes; 20 × depth charges, 1 rack and 2 throwers; 60 mines

HMS Esk was an E-class destroyer built for the Royal Navy in the early 1930s. She was designed to be easily converted into a fast minelayer by removing some guns and her torpedo tubes. Although assigned to the Home Fleet upon completion, the ship was attached to the Mediterranean Fleet in 1935–36, during the Abyssinia Crisis. During the Spanish Civil War of 1936–1939, she spent considerable time in Spanish waters, enforcing the arms blockade imposed by Britain and France on both sides of the conflict. Esk was converted to a minelayer when World War II began in September 1939, and spent most of her time laying mines. During the Norwegian Campaign of April–June 1940, the ship laid mines in Norwegian territorial waters before the Germans invaded, but was recalled to home waters to resume her minelaying duties in early May. During one such sortie, Esk was sunk during the Texel Disaster on the night of 31 August 1940, when she ran into a newly laid German minefield.

== Description ==
The E-class ships were slightly improved versions of the preceding D class. They displaced 1,405 long tons (1,428 t) at standard load and 1,940 long tons (1,970 t) at deep load. The ships had an overall length of 329 feet (100.3 m), a beam of 33 feet 3 inches (10.1 m) and a draught of 12 feet 6 inches (3.8 m). They were powered by two Parsons geared steam turbines, each driving one propeller shaft, using steam provided by three Admiralty three-drum boilers. The turbines developed a total of 36,000 shaft horsepower (27,000 kW) and gave a maximum speed of 35.5 knots (65.7 km/h; 40.9 mph). Esk carried a maximum of 480 long tons (490 t) of fuel oil that gave her a range of 6,350 nautical miles (11,760 km; 7,310 mi) at 15 knots (28 km/h; 17 mph). The ships' complement was 145 officers and ratings.

The ships mounted four 45-calibre 4.7-inch (120 mm) Mark IX guns in single mounts. For anti-aircraft (AA) defence, they had two quadruple Mark I mounts for the 0.5 inch Vickers Mark III machine gun. The E class was fitted with two above-water quadruple torpedo tube mounts for 21-inch (533 mm) torpedoes. One depth charge rail and two throwers were fitted; 20 depth charges were originally carried, but this increased to 35 shortly after the war began. To compensate for the weight of her 60 Mark XIV mines and their rails, two of Esk's 4.7-inch guns, their ammunition, both sets of torpedo tubes, her whalers and their davits had to be removed. She was given small sponsons at the stern to ensure smooth delivery of her mines.

== Construction and career ==
The ship was ordered 1 November 1932, from Swan Hunter & Wigham Richardson at Wallsend under the 1931 Naval Programme, for use as a destroyer that could quickly be converted for use as a minelayer when required. She was laid down on 24 March 1933, and launched on 19 March 1934. The ship was commissioned on 28 September 1934, at a total cost of £247,279, excluding government-furnished equipment like the armament. The ship accompanied the Home Fleet during its West Indies cruise between January and March 1935. Esk was attached to the Mediterranean Fleet from September 1935 to March 1936, during the Abyssinian Crisis. The ship patrolled Spanish waters during the Spanish Civil War, enforcing the edicts of the Non-Intervention Committee until March 1939, when she returned to the United Kingdom. During the Munich Crisis, Esk and her sister ship HMS Express were temporarily attached to the 9th Destroyer Flotilla at the Nore, and practiced minelaying on 3 October 1938. Esk was reduced to reserve on 24 June 1939, and was not recommissioned until 2 August. She attended the Reserve Fleet Review on the 15th, and then began conversion as a minelayer beginning on 28 August.

The conversion was completed on 7 September 1939, and the ship was assigned to the 20th Destroyer Flotilla the next day. Esk laid mines in the Heligoland Bight with her sister Express on the night of 9/10 September. She escorted the battleship Royal Sovereign from Scapa Flow to Portsmouth from 23–26 September, and then conducted minelaying operations from Milford Haven and Portsmouth through December. On 17–18 December, Esk, Express, HMS Intrepid and Ivanhoe laid 240 mines off the mouth of the Ems. She was refitted at Portsmouth from 29 December to 26 January 1940.

After the completion of her refit, Esk escorted the auxiliary minelayers HMS Princess Victoria and HMS Teviot Bank for the next six months, as they laid mines in the East Coast Barrier, as well as making occasional minelaying sorties of her own. On 3 March, Esk, Express, HMS Icarus and HMS Impulsive laid mines near Horns Reef in the Heligoland Bight, that sank the German submarine U-44 about 13 March. The ship was assigned to the Home Fleet at Scapa Flow at the beginning of April, and was allocated to "Force WV" with the ships of the 20th Flotilla for Operation Wilfred, an operation to lay mines in the Vestfjord to prevent the transport of Swedish iron ore from Narvik to Germany. On 5 April, "Force WV" sailed from Scapa Flow, escorted by the destroyers HMS Hardy, HMS Havock, HMS Hotspur and HMS Hunter of the 2nd Destroyer Flotilla. The ships of the 20th Destroyer Flotilla laid 234 mines in Vestfjord on the morning of 8 April, and later rendezvoused with the battlecruiser HMS Renown. On the 15th, she returned to Scapa Flow, escorting the battleship Rodney.

On 10 May, Esk, Express, Intrepid and Princess Victoria laid 236 mines off Bergen, North Holland, and on 15 May, she joined with Express and Ivanhoe to lay 164 mines off the Hook of Holland. Three German minesweepers, M 61, M 89, and M 136, were sunk by this minefield on 26 July. The ship joined the evacuation of Allied troops from Dunkirk on 29 May. Esk evacuated 3904 troops between 29 May and 3 June, including over 1,000 French troops rescued from the TSS Scotia, which was sinking after German air attacks. After repairs to the minor damage suffered by the ship during the evacuation, she resumed her previous duties.

On 31 August 1940, she sailed with Intrepid, Icarus, Ivanhoe and Express to lay a minefield off the Dutch coast, north of Texel. Express hit a mine in a newly-laid German field that night and had her bow blown off. Intrepid closed to assist her and almost immediately struck another mine. Later Esk also hit a mine and some 15 minutes later, there was another explosion amidships which caused Esk to break in two, and she quickly sank in position 53°26′36″N 03°48′00″E. 127 of the ship's company were killed or died at sea while others were later captured by the Germans after drifting at sea
