= Texel Disaster =

WWII British Navy incident

The Texel Disaster took place off the Dutch coast on the night of 31 August 1940 and involved the sinking of two Royal Navy destroyers, and damage to a third and a light cruiser. The disaster was caused by a destroyer flotilla running into an unmarked minefield, which caused serious damage to one vessel; two more destroyers were sunk going to the aid of the first, and a light cruiser sent as an escort was slightly damaged by a mine on the return journey. In all, the disaster caused approximately 300 deaths, with a further 100 men injured or taken prisoner of war.

== The disaster ==
On the night of 31 August 1940, the British 20th Destroyer Flotilla – consisting of HMS Express, Esk, Icarus, Intrepid and Ivanhoe – sailed from Immingham to the Dutch coast northwest of Texel to lay mines. The flotilla was joined by part of the 5th Destroyer Flotilla consisting of HMS Kelvin, Jupiter and Vortigern. While the ships were laying mines, air reconnaissance detected a German naval force moving west from Terschelling towards Britain; fearing an invasion the 20th flotilla was ordered to intercept.

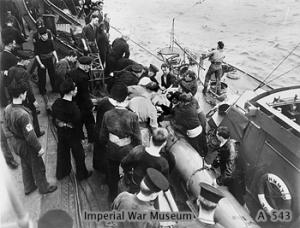
Wounded sailors from Express are transferred to Kelvin

Whilst heading for this German force, the flotilla ran into a newly laid, uncharted minefield and Express was badly damaged, losing most of her bow. The explosion caused heavy casualties: ninety of the 175 men on board were killed or wounded, including her captain, J.G. Bickford, who was injured by the explosion. Ivanhoe then went to transfer the wounded from Express but also hit a mine and was badly damaged, the explosion killing a further 53 men and wounding the majority of the crew. Later Esk also hit a mine and the vessel sank with 127 of the ship's company killed or died at sea. Several life rafts, carrying shipwrecked sailors, drifted into the Dutch coast where those on board were detained by the German authorities as prisoners of war.

1 September brought Kelvin and Jupiter from the 5th flotilla to help rescue the shipwrecked crews and later two light cruisers – HMS Aurora and Galatea – arrived as an escort. Ivanhoe was scuttled by fire from Kelvin and the ships returned to port. Jupiter towed the hulk of Express until tugs could be sent out to take over. On the way, Galatea hit a further mine and was slightly damaged.

== Aftermath ==
The final toll of the disaster was approximately 300 killed, with a further 100 injured or taken prisoner; this was the greatest loss of life suffered by Nore Command since the evacuation of Dunkirk. The German "invasion force" turned out to be a small minelaying unit transferring from Cuxhaven to Rotterdam. The casualties returning from the disaster, some badly burned, contributed to the myth that a German invasion had been repulsed by the use of burning oil floated on the sea. One theory amongst British civilians and press of the time laid the blame for the disaster with Lord Louis Mountbatten.
