= David Broadfoot =

Scottish seaman decorated for bravery

David Broadfoot GC
- Born: 21 July 1899; Stranraer, Scotland
- Died: 31 January 1953 (aged 53); North Channel
- Resting place: Parish churchyard, Inch, Dumfries and Galloway
- Awards: George Cross

David Broadfoot GC (21 July 1899 – 31 January 1953) was a Scottish seaman awarded the George Cross for his bravery during the sinking of the MV Princess Victoria in the North Sea flood of 1953.

He was born in Stranraer, Scotland. By 1917, he had gained a radio license and later qualified as a ship's Radio Officer. In this capacity, he served in merchant navy during both World War I and World War II.

In October 1950, he joined the crew of the MV Princess Victoria. He was serving on board the ship on 31 January 1953, when it sank in the North Channel east of Belfast with 135 fatalities in the worst maritime disaster in United Kingdom waters since World War II. Broadfoot remained at his post while the ship was sinking, sending messages to shore stations to enable them to locate the ship. He was posthumously awarded the George Cross, the highest award for bravery to British civilians.

In 1999, his grandchildren donated the George Cross to the Stranraer town museum, where it is now on display along with other memorabilia from the sinking.

== George Cross Citation ==
"The QUEEN has been graciously pleased to make undermentioned award :-

GEORGE CROSS.

David BROADFOOT (deceased), Radio Officer, m.v. "Princess Victoria". (Stranraer.)

"Princess Victoria" left Stranraer on the morning of 31st January, 1953, carrying 127 passengers for Larne. After leaving Loch Ryan she encountered north-westerly gales and squalls of sleet and snow. A heavy sea struck the ship and burst open the stern doors and sea water flooded the space on the car deck causing a list to starboard of about 10 degrees. Attempts were made to secure the stern doors but without success. The Master tried his ship back to Loch Ryan but the conditions were of such severity that the manoeuvre failed. Some of the ship's cargo shifted from the port to the starboard side and this increased the list as the crippled vessel endeavoured to make her way across the Irish Sea.

From the moment when "Princess Victoria" first got into difficulties, Radio Officer Broadfoot constantly sent out wireless messages giving the ship's position and asking for assistance. The severe list which the vessel had taken, and which was gradually increasing, rendered his task even more difficult. Despite the difficulties and danger he steadfastly continued his work at the transmitting set, repeatedly sending signals to the coast radio station to enable them to ascertain the ship's exact position.

When "Princess Victoria" finally stopped in sight of the Irish Coast her list had increased to 45 degrees. The vessel was practically on her beam ends and the order to abandon ship was given. Thinking only of saving the lives of passengers and crew, Radio Officer Broadfoot remained in the W/T cabin, receiving and sending messages although he must have known that if he did this he had no chance of surviving. The ship finally foundered and Radio Officer Broadfoot went down with her. He had deliberately sacrificed his own life in an attempt to save others."

== Grave ==
His gravestone is in the Inch Parish Churchyard in Inch, Scotland; several memorials of the disaster are located on both sides of the North Channel.

== See also ==
- List of George Cross recipients
- List of United Kingdom disasters by death toll
