= HMS Ivanhoe (D16) =

I-class destroyer

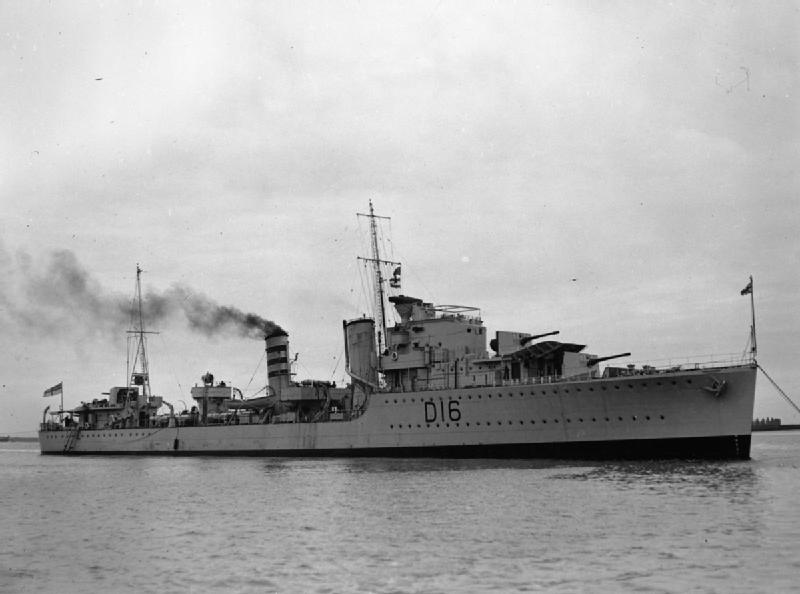
- Ivanhoe in September 1938, as part of 3rd Destroyer Flotilla

History

United Kingdom
- Name: HMS Ivanhoe
- Namesake: Ivanhoe
- Ordered: 30 October 1935
- Builder: Yarrow Shipbuilders, Scotstoun
- Cost: £259,371
- Laid down: 12 February 1936
- Launched: 11 February 1937
- Completed: 24 August 1937
- Identification: Pennant number: D16
- Fate: Mined and later scuttled, 31 August–1 September 1940

General characteristics (as built)
- Class & type: I-class destroyer
- Displacement: 1,370 long tons (1,390 t) (standard); 1,888 long tons (1,918 t) (deep load)
- Length: 323 ft (98.5 m)
- Beam: 33 ft (10.1 m)
- Draught: 12 ft 6 in (3.8 m)
- Installed power: 3 Admiralty 3-drum boilers; 34,000 shp (25,000 kW)
- Propulsion: 2 shafts, 2 geared steam turbines
- Speed: 35.5 knots (65.7 km/h; 40.9 mph)
- Range: 5,500 nmi (10,200 km; 6,300 mi) at 15 knots (28 km/h; 17 mph)
- Complement: 145
- Sensors & processing systems: ASDIC
- Armament: 4 × single 4.7 in (120 mm) guns; 2 × quadruple 0.5-inch (12.7 mm) machine guns; 2 × quintuple 21 in (533 mm) torpedo tubes; 1 × rack and 2 throwers for 16 depth charges; 60 mines

Service record
- Operations: Norwegian Campaign; Action off Lofoten; Dunkirk evacuation
- Victories: U-45

HMS Ivanhoe was an I-class destroyer built for the Royal Navy in the mid-1930s. During the Spanish Civil War of 1936–1939, the ship enforced the arms blockade imposed by Britain and France on both sides as part of the Mediterranean Fleet. Before the start of World War II, the ship was modified so that she could be used to lay mines by removing some of her armament. Ivanhoe was transferred to Western Approaches Command shortly after the war began and helped to sink one German submarine in October 1939. She was converted to a minelayer while undergoing a refit in November–December and laid minefields in German coastal waters as well as anti-submarine minefields off the British coast until she was reconverted back to her destroyer configuration in February 1940. Ivanhoe reverted to her minelaying role during the Norwegian Campaign in April 1940 and then laid a number of minefields off the Dutch coast during the Battle of the Netherlands in May. The ship participated in the Dunkirk evacuation until she was badly damaged by German aircraft on 1 June. On her first minelaying mission after her repairs were completed, she struck a German mine and had to be scuttled on 1 September 1940 during the Texel Disaster.

== Description ==
The I-class ships were improved versions of the preceding H-class. They displaced 1,370 long tons (1,390 t) at standard load and 1,888 long tons (1,918 t) at deep load. The ships had an overall length of 323 feet (98.5 m), a beam of 33 feet (10.1 m) and a draught of 12 feet 6 inches (3.8 m). They were powered by two Parsons geared steam turbines, each driving one propeller shaft, using steam provided by three Admiralty three-drum boilers. The turbines developed a total of 34,000 shaft horsepower (25,000 kW) and were intended to give a maximum speed of 35.5 knots (65.7 km/h; 40.9 mph). Ivanhoe only reached a speed of 34 knots (63 km/h; 39 mph) from 34,306 shp (25,582 kW) during her sea trials. The ships carried enough fuel oil to give them a range of 5,500 nautical miles (10,200 km; 6,300 mi) at 15 knots (28 km/h; 17 mph). Their crew numbered 145 officers and ratings.

The ships mounted four 4.7-inch (120 mm) Mark IX guns in single mounts, designated 'A', 'B', 'X' and 'Y' from bow to stern. For anti-aircraft (AA) defence, they had two quadruple mounts for the 0.5 inch Vickers Mark III machine gun. The I class was fitted with two above-water quintuple torpedo tube mounts for 21-inch (533 mm) torpedoes. One depth charge rack and two throwers were fitted; 16 depth charges were originally carried, but this increased to 35 shortly after the war began. Ivanhoe was one of the four I-class destroyers fitted with minelaying equipment in late 1938 – January 1939 at Malta. This consisted of mounts for rails on the deck on which to carry the mines and an electric winch to move the mines down the rails. A pair of sponsons were added to the stern to allow the mines to clear the propellers when dropped into the sea. 'A' and 'Y' guns and both sets of torpedo tubes were modified to allow them to be removed to compensate for the weight of the mines. The ships could carry a maximum of 72 mines. The I-class ships were fitted with the ASDIC sound detection system to locate submarines underwater.

== Construction and career ==
The ship was ordered from Yarrow Shipbuilders at Scotstoun on 30 October 1935 under the 1935 Naval Programme. The ship was laid down on 12 February 1936 and launched on 11 February 1937 as the second Royal Navy warship to carry the name. Ivanhoe was completed on 24 August 1937 and cost £259,371 excluding items supplied by the Admiralty such as guns and communications equipment. She was assigned to the 3rd Destroyer Flotilla in the Mediterranean Fleet upon commissioning and participated in training exercises with the French Navy from December to January 1938. The ship was forced to leave these exercises prematurely as she had problems with the tubes in her superheaters, that were replaced at Malta from 15 January – 19 March. Afterwards, Ivanhoe was transferred to Gibraltar where she patrolled Spanish waters enforcing the policies of the Non-Intervention Committee until the end of the war. She was in Cartagena from February to March 1939 to protect British citizens and interests as foreigners, Republican troops and their supporters evacuated the city.

Ivanhoe was in transit between Alexandria and Malta when the Second World War began in September 1939 but she was in Plymouth on 14 September as the 3rd Destroyer Flotilla had been transferred to the Western Approaches Command for escort duties. Together with her sisters, Inglefield, Intrepid, and Icarus, the ship sank the German submarine U-45 on 14 October. She was refitted at Sheerness Dockyard and converted to a minelayer from 14 November to 13 December. Ivanhoe was transferred to the specialist minelaying 20th Destroyer Flotilla on 12 December and laid her first minefield, along with the other three ships of the flotilla, at the mouth of the Ems estuary on the night of 17/18 December. Another minefield was laid on the night of 2/3 January 1940 by Ivanhoe and Intrepid and they then laid a series of anti-submarine minefields later in the month. The ship replaced her guns and torpedo tubes at Portland from 27 January to 3 February and resumed her former duties.

In early April, Ivanhoe and three other destroyer minelayers were escorted by the 2nd Destroyer Flotilla as they laid mines as part of Operation Wilfred, an operation to lay mines in the Vestfjord to prevent the shipment of Swedish iron ore from Narvik to Germany. The mines were laid on the early morning of 8 April, before the Germans began their invasion, and the destroyers joined the battlecruiser HMS Renown and her escorts after they each laid their 60 mines. The ship was present during, but played no significant part in, Renown's brief Action off Lofoten with the German battleships Scharnhorst and Gneisenau on 9 April. Later in the month, the ship carried troops of the 15th Infantry Brigade to Åndalsnes. Ivanhoe then loaded mines and laid a minefield in the approaches to Trondheim, together with Icarus and Impulsive, on the night of 29/30 April.

After a boiler cleaning (7–15 May) Ivanhoe, Esk, and Express, laid 164 mines off the Hook of Holland on the night of 15/16 May. Three German minesweepers were sunk by this minefield on 26 July. Three nights later, the same three ships, reinforced by Intrepid, Impulsive, and the auxiliary minelayer Princess Victoria laid a minefield off the Dutch coast. Princess Victoria struck a German mine on the voyage home and was sunk; the destroyers rescued the ship's survivors. They laid five more minefields off the Dutch coast before the end of the month. On 29 May, the ship was transferred to the Dunkirk evacuation effort and ferried 930 troops to Dover that day. She also took aboard the crew of the badly damaged destroyer Grafton and then scuttled Grafton. She was withdrawn from the evacuation on 30 May as too valuable to risk, but this decision was reversed the following day and Ivanhoe evacuated 1,290 men to Dover. On the morning of 1 June, already having loaded troops, the ship was attacked off Dunkirk harbour by German aircraft. Two bombs missed to port and starboard, but the third detonated above the upper deck and flooded the two forward boiler rooms. The bomb killed 26, including five soldiers, and wounded many others. Most of the troops and wounded were taken off by the minesweeper Speedwell and the destroyer Havant. No. 3 boiler room was still operable and the ship reached Dover under her own power.

Repairs at Sheerness lasted until 28 August and she was converted back into a minelayer at Immingham from 28 to 31 August as she was transferred back to the 20th Destroyer Flotilla. That night, she sailed with Intrepid, Icarus, Esk and Express to lay a minefield off the Dutch coast, north of Texel. Express hit a mine in a new German field that night and had her bow blown off. Ivanhoe closed to assist her and struck another mine shortly afterwards. The explosion knocked out her power for several hours, but the ship was able to raise steam by 01:45 on 1 September. She reached a speed of 7 knots (13 km/h; 8.1 mph) while steaming backwards to lessen the stress on her damaged bow. However, about 04:00, either her propellers fell off or her propeller shafts fractured, and she lost all speed. Around 08:00, four motor torpedo boats arrived; three of these loaded all but 37 men of the ship's crew while the fourth stayed with the destroyer to recover the remaining crewmen. Ivanhoe continued to take on water and started to list. Early in the afternoon, she lost all power to her pumps and the captain ordered the ship abandoned after opening her valves to speed her sinking. Shortly afterwards, Ivanhoe was discovered and damaged by a German aircraft, but still did not sink. She had to be scuttled by a torpedo fired by the destroyer Kelvin later in the afternoon. The ship quickly sank afterwards at position 53°26′42″N 03°45′24″E.
