= MV Princess Victoria =

British ferry (1947–1953)

History
- Name: MV Princess Victoria
- Owner: British Transport Commission
- Operator: 1947–1948 London, Midland and Scottish Railway; 1948–1953 British Railways
- Port of registry: Stranraer
- Route: Stranraer – Larne
- Builder: William Denny and Brothers, Dumbarton
- Yard number: 1399
- Launched: 27 August 1946
- In service: 1947
- Fate: Sank 31 January 1953

General characteristics
- Class & type: roll-on/roll-off ferry
- Tonnage: 2,694 GRT
- Length: 309.75 ft (94 m)
- Beam: 48 ft (15 m)
- Depth: 16.67 ft (5 m)
- Installed power: 2 × 2-stroke, single-acting Sulzer diesel engines
- Speed: 19 knots (35 km/h; 22 mph)
- Capacity: 1,500 passengers, 70 tons cargo, 40 cars

MV Princess Victoria was one of the earliest roll-on/roll-off ferries. Completed in 1947, she operated from Stranraer, Scotland, to Larne, Northern Ireland, initially by the London, Midland and Scottish Railway (LMS) until 1 January 1948 and thereafter by LMS's successor British Railways. During a severe storm on 31 January 1953, she sank in the North Channel with the loss of 135 lives. This was the deadliest maritime disaster in United Kingdom waters since World War II. For many years it was believed that 133 people had lost their lives in the disaster. However, research by a local historian, Liam Kelly, identified two other victims—Gordon Wright and Thomas Saunders—who had not been identified as there had been no passenger list at the time.

== History ==
Princess Victoria was launched on 27 August 1946 and completed in 1947 by William Denny and Brothers, Dumbarton for the London, Midland and Scottish Railway (LMS). She was the first purpose-built ferry of her kind to operate in British coastal waters and the fourth ship to bear the name, her 1939 predecessor, on minesweeping duties, having been sunk during World War II in the Humber Estuary by a German mine. Although innovative in her loading methods, the vessel looked externally similar to her predecessor. She could hold 1,500 passengers plus cargo and had sleeping accommodation for 54.

== Sinking ==
Captained by 55-year-old James Ferguson, the vessel left Stranraer's railway loading pier at 07:45 with 44 tons of cargo, 128 passengers and 51 crew. Captain Ferguson had served as master on various ferries on the same route for 17 years. A gale warning was in force but he made the decision to put to sea. Loch Ryan is a sheltered inlet and the immediate force of the wind and sea was not apparent, but it was noted that spray was breaking over the stern doors. A "guillotine door" had been fitted, because of a previously identified problem with spray and waves hitting the stern doors, but it was rarely used, because it took too long to raise and lower. This would have provided extra protection for the sliding stern doors. On this occasion, it was already damaged and therefore not able to be lowered.

Shortly after clearing the mouth of Loch Ryan, which took 40 minutes longer than usual, the ship turned west towards Larne and exposed her stern to the worst of the high seas. Huge waves damaged the low stern doors, allowing water to enter the car deck. The crew struggled to close the doors again but they proved to be too badly damaged and water continued to flood in from the waves. The scuppers did not allow the water to drain away properly because the ship had been built with a level deck and not sloping to the ship's sides; the inquiry revealed that the scuppers were not large enough anyway. The ship took a list to starboard and at this point Captain Ferguson decided to retreat to the safety of Loch Ryan by going astern and using the bow rudder. This proved to be impossible because the extreme conditions prevented the deckhands from releasing the securing pin on the bow rudder. The captain then made a decision to try to reach the Irish coast by adopting a course which would keep the stern of the craft sheltered from the worst of the elements.

At 09:46, almost two hours after leaving Stranraer, a message was transmitted in Morse code (Princess Victoria did not have a radio telephone) by radio operator David Broadfoot to the Portpatrick Radio Station: "Hove-to off mouth of Loch Ryan. Vessel not under command. Urgent assistance of tugs required". With a list to starboard exacerbated by shifting cargo, water continued to enter the ship. At 10:32, an SOS message was finally transmitted, and the order to abandon ship was given at 14:00.

Possibly, the first warship in the area was HMS Launceston Castle, commanded by Lt Cdr J. M. Cowling, a frigate that was en route to Derry. Searches were carried out but Launceston Castle was forced to leave when her condensers were contaminated by salt. Upon the upgrade of the assistance message to an SOS, the Portpatrick lifeboat Jeannie Speirs (ON 788) was dispatched, as was the destroyer HMS Contest. Contest, commanded by Lt Cdr H. P. Fleming, left Rothesay at 11:09. Although she came close to Princess Victoria's position at 13:30, poor visibility prevented the crew from seeing the sinking ship. The destroyer had been trying to maintain a speed of 31 knots (57 km/h; 36 mph) to reach the listing ferry but, after sustaining damage from the seas, Lt Cdr Fleming was forced to reduce speed to 16 knots (30 km/h; 18 mph).

Princess Victoria was still reporting her position as 5 miles (8 km) north-west of Corsewall Point but her engines were still turning and even at the speed of 5 knots (9.3 km/h; 5.8 mph) were gradually drawing the vessel closer to the coast of Ireland and away from her reported position. At 13:08, the ship broadcast that her engines had stopped. The final Morse code message at 13:58 reported the ship "on her beam ends" five miles east of the Copeland Islands.

== Rescue attempt ==
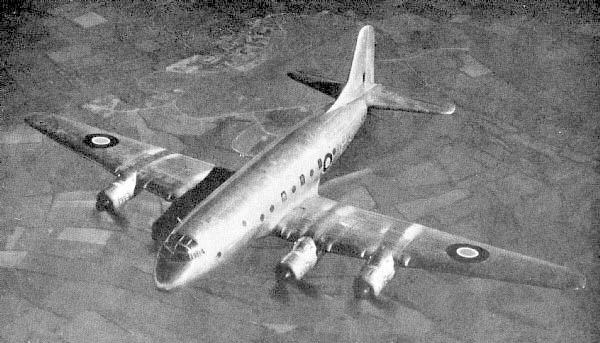
RAF Handley Page Hastings

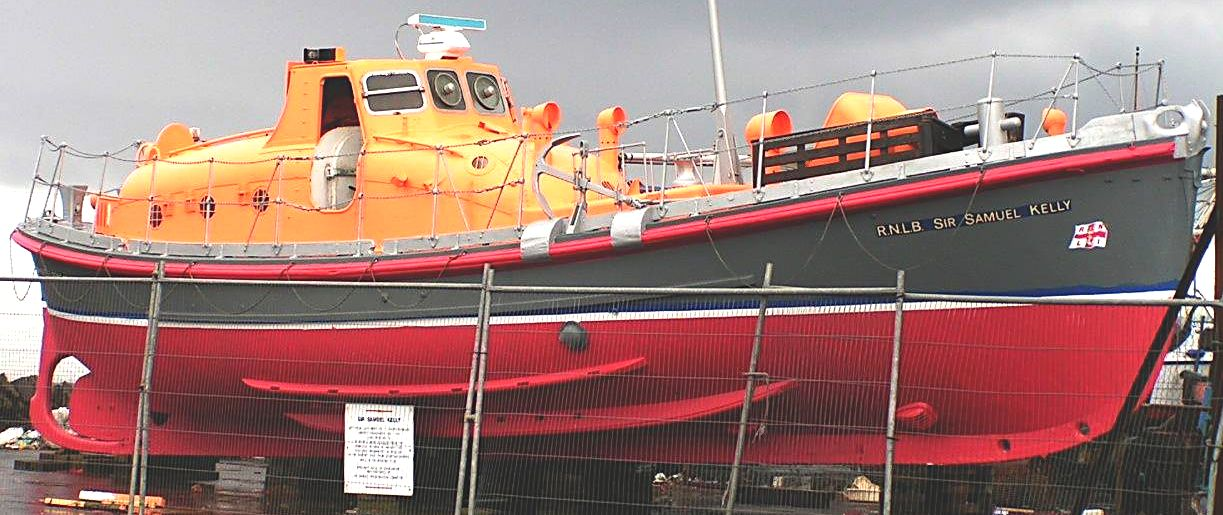
The lifeboat Sir Samuel Kelly preserved in Donaghadee, Northern Ireland

The court of inquiry found that assistance to Princess Victoria had been hampered by resources attending to other distress operations already underway elsewhere in the extreme weather conditions of the day. An RAF Hastings aircraft had been assisting rescues off Lewis and Barra and as a result did not reach the position of the ferry until 15:31, dropping supplies and guiding HMS Contest to the scene.

The inquiry noted how different the outcome might have been had the aircraft been available earlier. Confusion over the position of Princess Victoria had contributed to the rescue vessels' difficulty in finding her and it was not until the crew had sighted the coast of Northern Ireland at 13:35 and transmitted a new position fix that rescuers could find them.

In addition to the Navy ships, RAF craft and lifeboats assisting, four merchant vessels that had been sheltering in Belfast Lough put to sea immediately after hearing the transmission that gave Princess Victoria's position to be near their anchorage: the cattle ship Lairdsmoor, trawler Eastcotes, coastal oil tanker Pass of Drumochter and coastal cargo ship Orchy.

Despite arriving before the lifeboats, the merchant ships were unable to rescue the survivors in lifeboats, as the fierce waves were in danger of dashing the smaller boats against their sides. All they could do was to provide shelter from the worst of the seas until the Donaghadee lifeboat, Sir Samuel Kelly, arrived and was able to bring survivors on board. This lifeboat has been preserved and is now part of the collection of the North Down Museum, in the care of Dee Heritage Preservation Company in Donaghadee.

The captains of the merchant ships: James Alexander Bell of Lairdsmoor, David Brewster of Eastcotes, James Kelly of Pass of Drumochter and Hugh Angus of Orchy were each appointed Member of the Order of the British Empire. Lieutenant Commander Stanley Lawrence McArdle and Chief Petty Officer Wilfred Warren of HMS Contest were both awarded the George Medal for diving into the water to help survivors.

The ship's radio officer, David Broadfoot, was posthumously awarded the George Cross for staying at his post to the very end, allowing passengers and crew to escape, even though by doing so he was preventing his own escape. His medal is on permanent display in Stranraer Museum.

There were 44 survivors, all men, and none of the ship's officers were among them.

== Loss of life ==
The sinking of Princess Victoria occurred during a severe European windstorm that also caused the North Sea flood of 1953, sometimes called the Great Flood, claiming 531 fatalities in the UK, 53 on Canvey Island alone, in the Thames Estuary, although this sinking was the worst single incident in that storm. There were 135 deaths, including the Deputy Prime Minister of Northern Ireland, Maynard Sinclair, and the MP for North Down, Sir Walter Smiles. There were no women or children among the survivors. Eyewitnesses reported seeing a lifeboat containing at least some of the women and children being smashed against the side of Princess Victoria by the huge waves. The disaster shocked many people because, although it took place in exceptionally extreme weather conditions, it involved a routine journey, on a relatively short crossing (20 miles, 32 km) in what were believed to be safe waters.

In Larne and Stranraer, small towns that largely relied on their seaports, most families were affected in some way. A ceremony was held in Larne; wreaths were thrown on the water and the crowd sang "Lord, hear us when we cry to thee, for those in peril on the sea".

The bodies of 100 people who died in the disaster were eventually recovered, although some of them came ashore as far away as the Isle of Man.

== Court of Enquiry ==
The Court of Enquiry into the sinking, held in March 1953 at Crumlin Road Courthouse in Belfast, found that Princess Victoria was lost due to two factors: first, the stern doors were not sufficiently robust: second, arrangements for clearing water from the car deck were inadequate, the deck being level and not sloping to the ship's sides and the drains themselves (scuppers) being too small. The report concluded: "If the Princess Victoria had been as staunch as those who manned her, then all would have been well and the disaster averted." The court also noted that the duty destroyer HMS Tenacious from the 3rd Training Squadron, based at HMS Sea Eagle at Londonderry Port, was unable to put to sea, as too many men had been released on shore leave. As a consequence of the enquiry, the duty destroyer from the 3rd Squadron was subsequently based "on station" at the mouth of Lough Foyle on one hour readiness to put to sea.

== Memorials ==
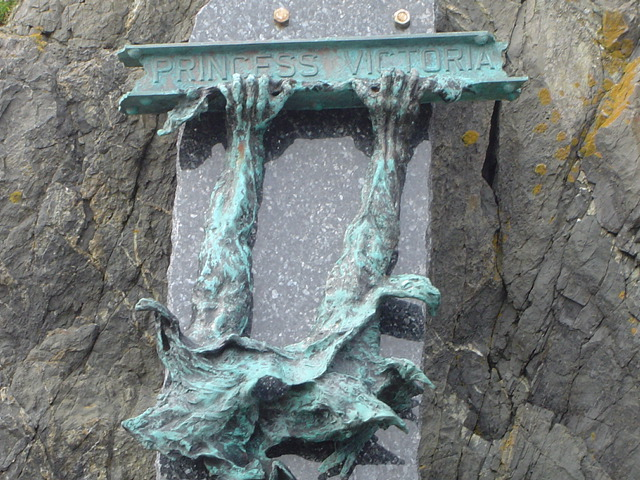
Memorial in Portpatrick

Memorials have been erected in Chaine Road, Larne, County Antrim, in Portpatrick, Wigtownshire and in Stranraer, Wigtownshire (where 23 inhabitants lost their lives in the disaster). It has become the custom for a memorial service to be held on both sides of the North Channel on the anniversary of the sinking. Many of the survivors continue to attend these religious services.

In 2003, on the 50th anniversary, a new plaque with the names of those lost was unveiled at the Victoria Memorial in Agnew Park, Stranraer. A piper played the tune "Lament of the MV Princess Victoria". Two new plaques were also unveiled at the Victoria Memorial in Larne.

RNLB Sir Samuel Kelly (ON 885), from Donaghadee, one of the two lifeboats involved in the Princess Victoria rescue, has been preserved and is in a nearby car park. There is a memorial plaque and sculpture by Joseph Scherrer, on the cliff face overlooking the Irish Sea, which was erected in 2003, 50 years after the disaster.

There were calls for a 60th-anniversary memorial service to be held in 2013, at St Anne's Cathedral, Belfast.

The disaster was memorialised by Belfast poet Roy McFadden in "Elegy for the Dead of the Princess Victoria" (Lisnagarvey Press 1953).

British folk singer Gareth Davies-Jones wrote a song "Princess Victoria" dedicated to those who lost their lives in the disaster which he recorded on his 2008 album Water & Light.

On 28 January 2018, a memorial service was held in Donaghadee for the 65th anniversary of the sinking. Donaghadee, Portpatrick and Larne RNLI lifeboats met at the wreck site to lay wreaths. A church service was attended by representatives from Donaghadee, Portpatrick, Larne, Portaferry, Bangor and Newcastle lifeboat crews; as well as local MPs and dignitaries from the area.

== Wreck site ==
The wreck lay undiscovered until 1992. A team from Cromarty Firth Diving, led by John MacKenzie and funded by the BBC, was able to locate it by using data provided by a Royal Navy seabed survey carried out in 1973. The ship was 5 miles (8 km) north-north-east of the Copeland Islands in 90 metres (300 ft) of water. Video footage and stills from this expedition were transmitted on a BBC programme called Home Truths (Things Don't Happen to Boats Like This) on the 40th anniversary of the sinking in 1993.

In 2008, to commemorate the 55th anniversary of the sinking, a memorial service was held at Larne which was organised by the Royal Antediluvian Order of Buffaloes. A specially composed accordion tune, "Victoria", was played during the service.

== Similar incidents ==
There have been other sinkings of roll-on/roll-off ferries e.g. the Jan Heweliusz and Estonia (both of which sank in storms that they should have survived), as well as the Herald of Free Enterprise (which capsized due to water ingress into the car deck through the bow doors inadvertently left open when the vessel was under way).

== See also ==
- List of disasters in Great Britain and Ireland by death toll
- List of roll-on/roll-off vessel accidents
- List of ships built by William Denny and Brothers
