= German submarine U-45 (1938) =

German World War II submarine

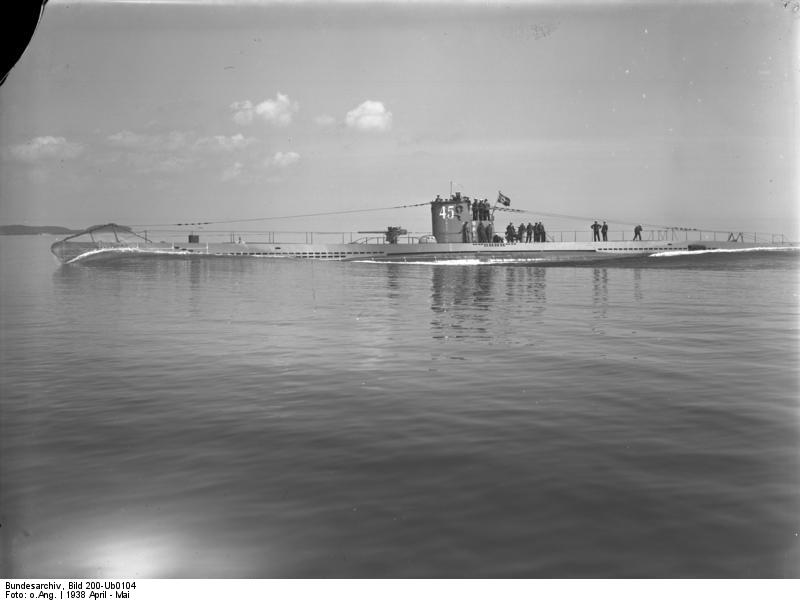
- U-45 conducting speed trials in 1938. Note her number on the conning tower, it was removed at the beginning of the war

History

Nazi Germany
- Name: U-45
- Ordered: 21 November 1936
- Builder: Germaniawerft, Kiel
- Yard number: 580
- Laid down: 23 February 1937
- Launched: 27 April 1938
- Commissioned: 25 June 1938
- Fate: Sunk, 14 October 1939

General characteristics
- Class & type: Type VIIB U-boat
- Displacement: 753 t (741 long tons) surfaced; 857 t (843 long tons) submerged
- Length: 66.50 m (218 ft 2 in) o/a; 48.80 m (160 ft 1 in) pressure hull
- Beam: 6.20 m (20 ft 4 in) o/a; 4.70 m (15 ft 5 in) pressure hull
- Height: 9.50 m (31 ft 2 in)
- Draught: 4.74 m (15 ft 7 in)
- Installed power: 2,800–3,200 PS (2,100–2,400 kW; 2,800–3,200 bhp) (diesels); 750 PS (550 kW; 740 shp) (electric)
- Propulsion: 2 shafts; 2 × diesel engines; 2 × electric motors
- Speed: 17.9 knots (33.2 km/h; 20.6 mph) surfaced; 8 knots (15 km/h; 9.2 mph) submerged
- Range: 8,700 nmi (16,112 km; 10,012 mi) at 10 knots (19 km/h; 12 mph)surfaced; 90 nmi (170 km; 100 mi) at 4 knots (7.4 km/h; 4.6 mph)
- Test depth: 230 m (750 ft). Calculated crush depth: 250–295 m (820–968 ft)
- Complement: 4 officers, 40 to 56 enlisted
- Sensors & processing systems: Gruppenhorchgerät
- Armament: 5 × 53.3 cm (21 in) torpedo tubes (four bow, one stern); 14 torpedoes or 26 TMA mines or 39 TMB mines; 1 × 8.8 cm (3.46 in) deck gun (220 rounds); 1 × 2 cm (0.79 in) C/30 anti-aircraft gun

Service record
- Part of: 7th U-boat Flotilla; 25 June 1938 – 14 October 1939
- Identification codes: M 08 204
- Commanders: Kptlt. Alexander Gelhaar; 25 June 1938 – 14 October 1939
- Operations: 2 patrols: 1st patrol: 19 August – 15 September 1939; 2nd patrol: 9 – 14 October 1939
- Victories: 2 merchant ships sunk (19,313 GRT)

German submarine U-45 was a Type VIIB U-boat of Nazi Germany's Kriegsmarine during World War II. She was ordered on 21 November 1936 and laid down on 23 February 1937 at Germaniawerft in Kiel as yard number 580. She was launched on 27 April 1938 and commissioned on 25 June 1938 under the command of Kapitänleutnant (Kptlt.) Alexander Gelhaar.

== Design ==
German Type VIIB submarines were preceded by the shorter Type VIIA submarines. U-45 had a displacement of 753 tonnes (741 long tons) when at the surface and 857 tonnes (843 long tons) while submerged. She had a total length of 66.50 m (218 ft 2 in), a pressure hull length of 48.80 m (160 ft 1 in), a beam of 6.20 m (20 ft 4 in), a height of 9.50 m (31 ft 2 in), and a draught of 4.74 m (15 ft 7 in). The submarine was powered by two Germaniawerft F46 four-stroke, six-cylinder supercharged diesel engines producing a total of 2,800 to 3,200 metric horsepower (2,060 to 2,350 kW; 2,760 to 3,160 shp) for use while surfaced, two BBC GG UB 720/8 double-acting electric motors producing a total of 750 metric horsepower (550 kW; 740 shp) for use while submerged. She had two shafts and two 1.23 m (4 ft) propellers. The boat was capable of operating at depths of up to 230 metres (750 ft).

The submarine had a maximum surface speed of 17.9 knots (33.2 km/h; 20.6 mph) and a maximum submerged speed of 8 knots (15 km/h; 9.2 mph). When submerged, the boat could operate for 90 nautical miles (170 km; 100 mi) at 4 knots (7.4 km/h; 4.6 mph); when surfaced, she could travel 8,700 nautical miles (16,100 km; 10,000 mi) at 10 knots (19 km/h; 12 mph). U-45 was fitted with four 53.3 cm (21 in) torpedo tubes at the bow and one at the stern with fourteen torpedoes, one 8.8 cm (3.46 in) SK C/35 naval gun with 220 rounds, and an anti-aircraft gun. The boat had a complement of between forty-four and sixty.

== Service history ==
During her Kriegsmarine service, U-45 conducted only two war patrols and sank two vessels for a loss of 19,313 gross register tons (GRT).

While operating with others in an attack on an Allied convoy, U-45 was sunk by depth charges from the British destroyers HMS Inglefield, Ivanhoe and Intrepid on 14 October 1939 southwest of Ireland.

=== First war patrol ===
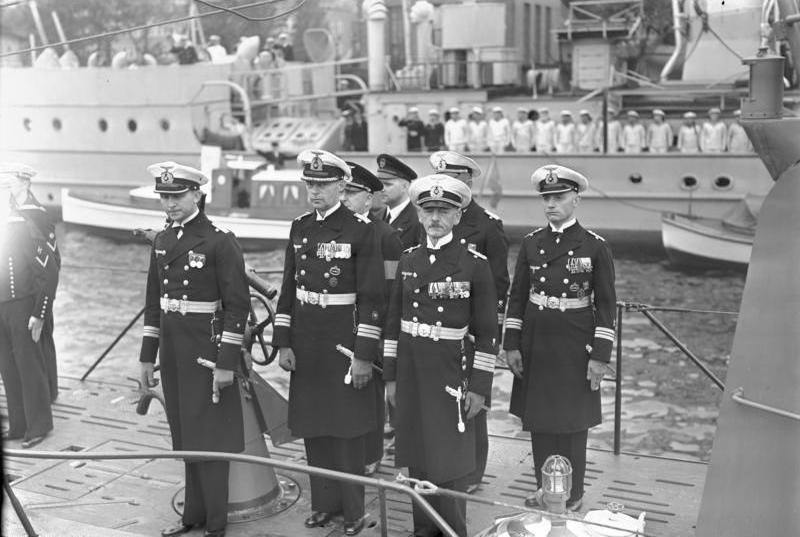
Commissioning of U-45 on 25 June 1938

Her training exercises completed, U-45 left Kiel on her first war patrol on 19 August 1939 (prior to the outbreak of World War II) under the command of Kptlt. Alexander Gelhaar. During 28 days at sea no enemy vessels were attacked and the submarine returned to her base at Kiel on 15 September 1939.

=== Second war patrol ===
Sailing again on 9 October 1939 under the command of Kptlt. Alexander Gelhaar, U-45 began her second and final war patrol. On 14 October, the U-boat sighted and attacked convoy KJF-3 about 230 nautical miles (430 km; 260 mi) southwest of Ireland. This attack yielded the only two successes by U-45, the 9,205 ton British freighter Lochavon and the 10,108 French merchant ship Bretagne. U-45 also attacked but failed to damage the 10,350 ton British steam merchantman Karamea; the single torpedo fired at this ship detonated prematurely (a common problem early in the war). Survivors of this attack were picked up by HMS Ilex and landed at Plymouth.

=== Fate ===
U-45 was depth-charged and sunk on 14 October 1939 by HMS Inglefield, HMS Ivanhoe and HMS Intrepid at position 50°58′N 12°57′W. All 38 crew members went down with the submarine.

== Summary of raiding history ==
Date	Name of ship	Nationality	Tonnage (GRT)	Fate
14 October 1939	Lochavon	United Kingdom	9,205	Sunk
14 October 1939	Bretagne	France	10,108	Sunk

== Gallery ==
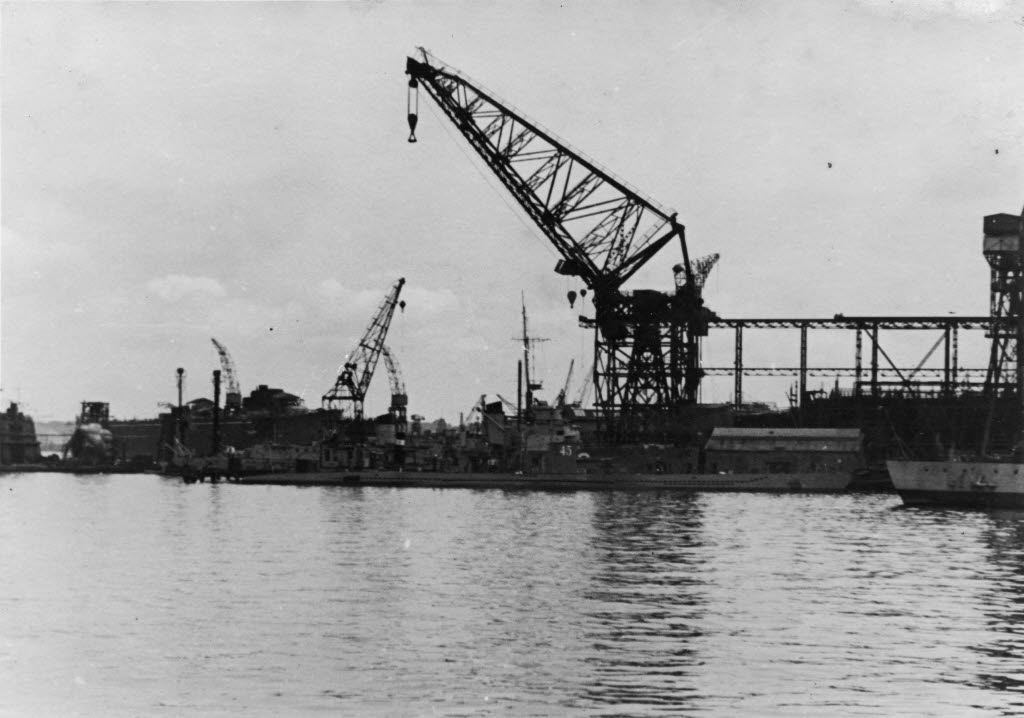
Outfitting in the Kiel shipyard

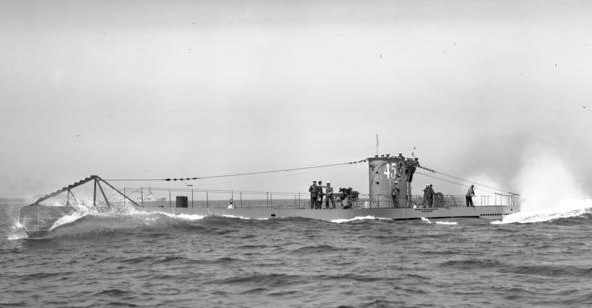
Sea trials before commissioning

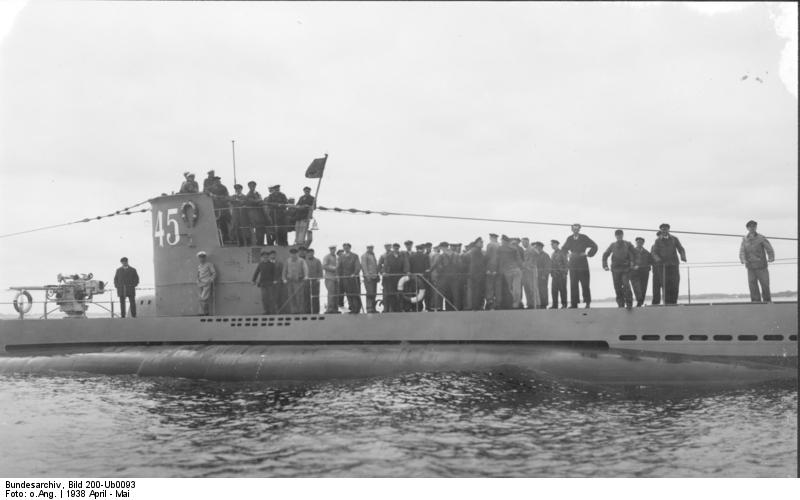
Crew on the deck during a sea trial

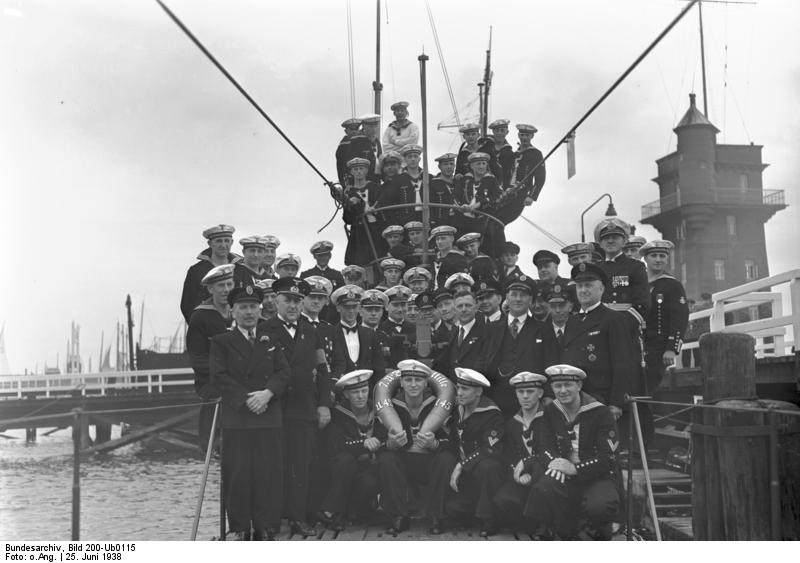
Day of the ship's commissioning

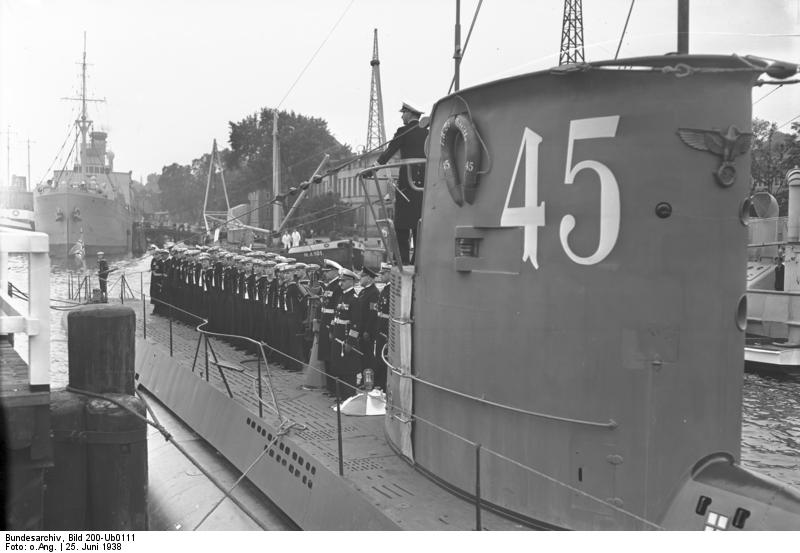
Crew aboard during Commissioning celebrations

== Bibliography ==
- Busch, Rainer; Röll, Hans-Joachim (1999). German U-boat commanders of World War II : a biographical dictionary. Translated by Brooks, Geoffrey. London, Annapolis, Md: Greenhill Books, Naval Institute Press. ISBN 1-55750-186-6.
- Busch, Rainer; Röll, Hans-Joachim (1999). Deutsche U-Boot-Verluste von September 1939 bis Mai 1945 [German U-boat losses from September 1939 to May 1945]. Der U-Boot-Krieg (in German). Vol. IV. Hamburg, Berlin, Bonn: Mittler. ISBN 3-8132-0514-2.
- Gröner, Erich; Jung, Dieter; Maass, Martin (1991). U-boats and Mine Warfare Vessels. German Warships 1815–1945. Vol. 2. Translated by Thomas, Keith; Magowan, Rachel. London: Conway Maritime Press. ISBN 0-85177-593-4.
- Kemp, Paul (1999). U-Boats Destroyed - German Submarine Losses in the World Wars. London: Arms & Armour. ISBN 1-85409-515-3.
