= HMS Inglefield =

Destroyer of the Royal Navy

Coordinates: 41°26′N 12°38′E

- HMS Inglefield, with HMS Hood in the background

History

United Kingdom
- Name: Inglefield
- Namesake: Admiral Sir Edward Augustus Inglefield
- Ordered: 14 November 1935
- Builder: Cammell Laird, Birkenhead
- Laid down: 29 April 1936
- Launched: 15 October 1936
- Commissioned: 25 June 1937
- Identification: Pennant number: D02/I02
- Motto: The sun my compass
- Honours and awards: Atlantic 1939-43, North Sea 1940, Norway 1940–42, Bismarck (Action) 1941, Malta Convoys 1942, Arctic 1942–43, Sicily 1943, Salerno 1943; Mediterranean 1944, Anzio 1944
- Fate: Sunk by German Hs 293 glide bomb, 25 February 1944
- Badge: On a Field White, a double headed eagle displayed per pale Blue and Red; (From the crest of Admiral Inglefield)

General characteristics (as built)
- Class & type: I-class destroyer
- Displacement: 1,544 long tons (1,569 t) (standard); 2,081 long tons (2,114 t) (deep load)
- Length: 330 ft (100.6 m) (o/a)
- Beam: 34 ft (10.4 m)
- Draught: 12 ft 6 in (3.8 m)
- Installed power: 3 Admiralty 3-drum boilers; 38,000 shp (28,000 kW)
- Propulsion: 2 shafts; 2 geared steam turbines
- Speed: 36 knots (67 km/h; 41 mph)
- Range: 5,500 nmi (10,200 km; 6,300 mi) at 15 knots (28 km/h; 17 mph)
- Complement: 175
- Sensors & processing systems: ASDIC
- Armament: 5 × single 4.7 in (120 mm) guns; 2 × quadruple 0.5 in (12.7 mm) machine guns; 2 × quintuple 21 in (533 mm) torpedo tubes; 16 × depth charges, 1 rail and 2 throwers

Service record
- Operations: Battle of Greece (1941); Destruction of Bismarck (1941); Operation Shingle (1944)
- Victories: Sank U-45 (1939) and U-63 (1940)

HMS Inglefield was an I-class destroyer leader built for the Royal Navy that served during World War II. She was the navy's last purpose-built flotilla leader. She was named after the 19th century Admiral Sir Edward Augustus Inglefield (1820–1894), and is so far the only warship to carry the name of that seafaring family. In May 1940, her pennant number was changed to I02.

== Description ==
The I-class ships were improved versions of the preceding H-class. Inglefield displaced 1,544 long tons (1,569 t) at standard load and 2,081 long tons (2,114 t) at deep load. The ship had an overall length of 330 feet (100.6 m), a beam of 34 feet (10.4 m) and a draught of 12 feet 6 inches (3.8 m). She was powered by two Parsons geared steam turbines, each driving one propeller shaft, using steam provided by three Admiralty three-drum boilers. The turbines developed a total of 38,000 shaft horsepower (28,000 kW) and were intended to give a maximum speed of 36 knots (67 km/h; 41 mph). Inglefield reached a speed of 36.7 knots (68.0 km/h; 42.2 mph) from 38,081 shp (28,397 kW) during her sea trials. The ship carried enough fuel oil to give her a range of 5,500 nautical miles (10,200 km; 6,300 mi) at 15 knots (28 km/h; 17 mph). Her crew numbered 175 officers and ratings.

The ship mounted five 4.7-inch (120 mm) Mark IX guns in single mounts, designated 'A', 'B', 'X' and 'Y' from bow to stern. For anti-aircraft (AA) defence, Inglefield was fitted with two quadruple mounts for the 0.5 inch Vickers Mark III machine gun. The I class was fitted with two above-water quintuple torpedo tube mounts amidships for 21-inch (533 mm) torpedoes. One depth charge rack and two throwers were fitted; 16 depth charges were originally carried, but this increased to 35 shortly after the war began. The I-class ships were fitted with the ASDIC sound detection system to locate submarines underwater.

== Anti-submarine action ==
On the outbreak of war, Inglefield was deployed as the leader of the 3rd Destroyer Flotilla, Mediterranean Fleet, and was based at Malta. However, she was transferred to the Home Fleet before the end of September 1939 to patrol the Western Approaches. In this rôle, she escorted the aircraft carrier Courageous, but was answering a distress signal from SS Kafirstan when Courageous was attacked and sunk. Inglefield searched in vain for the U-boat U-29 that sank the carrier. One month later, Inglefield, along with her sister ships Ivanhoe and Intrepid, sank U-boat U-45 off the southwest coast of Ireland. She again came under attack from Nazi U-boats when U-18 fired numerous torpedoes at her; they all missed. A few days after that last attack, the ship was required to tow the submarine HMS Triad back to Stavanger, after she was damaged while on patrol in the North Sea. Inglefield sank another German U-boat, U-63, in early 1940 with the help of her sister Imogen and the submarine Narwhal; 24 Germans were rescued.

== Operation Weserübung ==
In May 1940, after the failure of British forces in Norway, Inglefield was called upon to evacuate British troops from the Norwegian town of Åndalsnes. In June, she escorted the damaged destroyers Antelope and HMS Electra (which had collided with each other whilst escorting the aircraft carrier Ark Royal during air attacks on Trondheim) back to port. It was a slow trip as Electra's bow was damaged. Things were not helped by a violent storm which lasted for half of the journey time, during which, an ammunition locker on Electra's forecastle broke loose and started sliding around the deck.

== Pursuing German battleships ==
Inglefield was deployed to the North Sea with the destroyer Zulu to escort the battlecruisers Renown and Repulse in an unsuccessful operation to seek and destroy the German battleship Scharnhorst. It was believed that she was the heavy cruiser Deutschland, and a massive naval effort by the Royal Navy failed to stop her from returning to a German port.

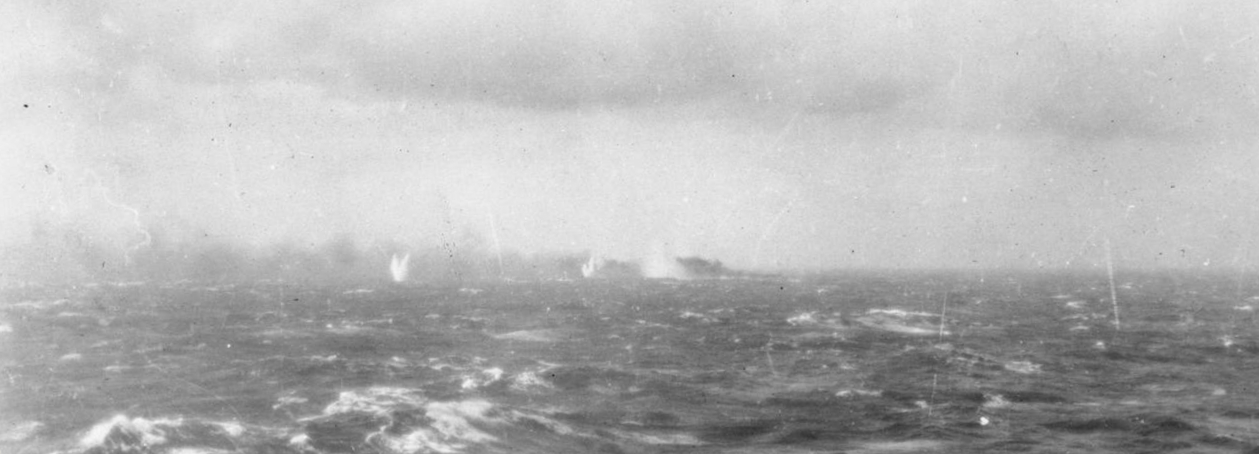
The Bismarck's last action

Perhaps her most famous role was in May 1941 when she served as part of the escort for the battleships King George V and Rodney in the pursuit and destruction of the German battleship Bismarck.

In August, she was present at Scapa Flow for a visit by King George VI, and even embarked the King for the review of the fleet and then for return passage to the mainland on 9 August.

== Convoy defence ==
She was part of the escort for the first convoy to the USSR, along with the aircraft carriers HMS Victorious, and then HMS Argus. She would regularly return to escort duties in the Arctic, as she was often deployed with the Home Fleet. But occasionally she was sent elsewhere on a particular mission. One example was in early 1942 when she supported commando raids on the Norwegian coast and bombarded Florø with her sister ship Intrepid, an action which sank three ships and damaged on-shore factories. Another example was in April 1942 when she was also deployed to the Mediterranean to escort the American carrier Wasp to Malta in April 1942. On 3 July 1942, she was detached from an Arctic convoy to search for the German battleship Tirpitz, which was reported to have left her normal anchorage. In 1943, she was transferred from Arctic convoy duty to Atlantic convoy defence, but she still spent much of her time in home waters.

== Italian invasion ==
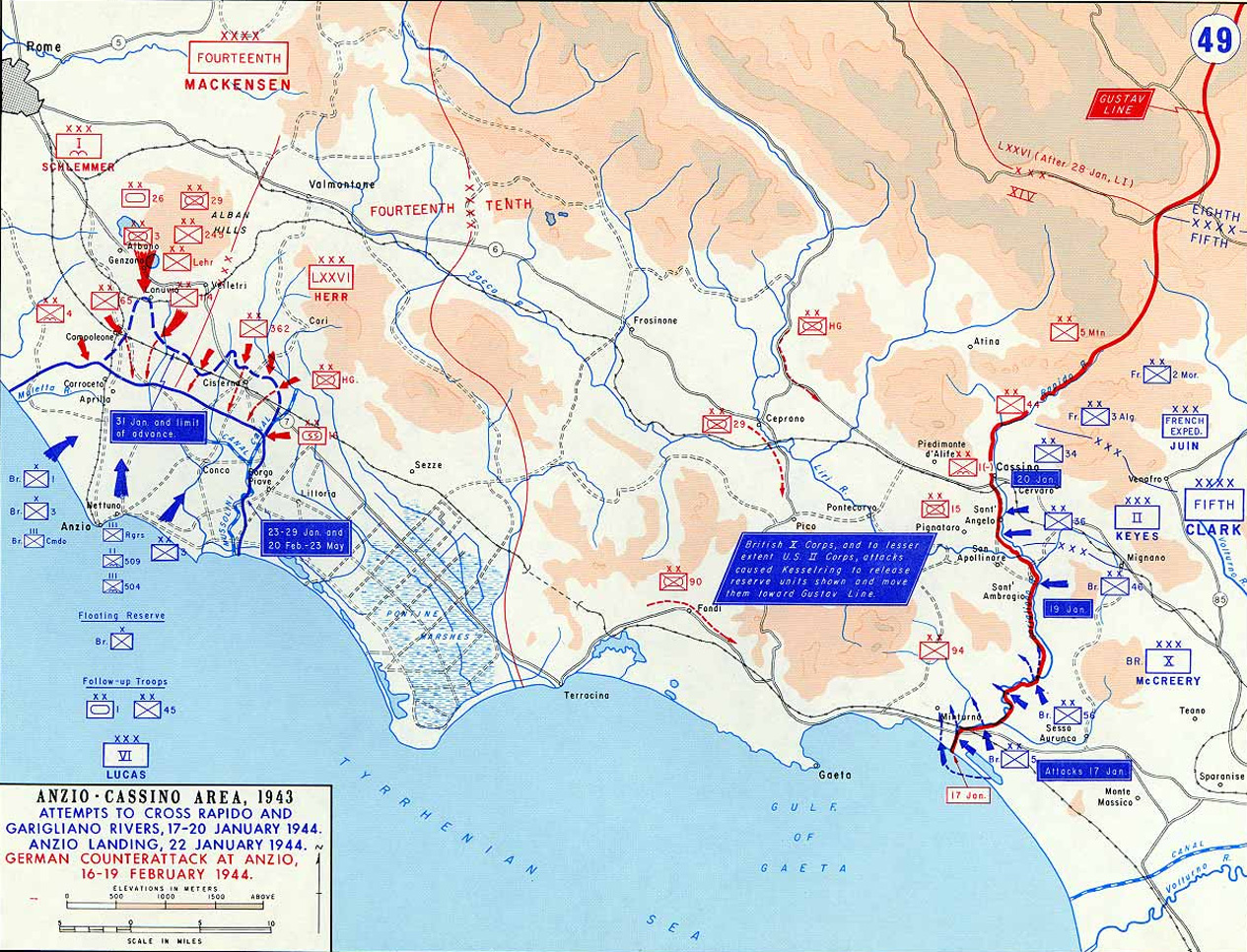
Inglefield supported the landings at Anzio by bombarding reinforcement and supply routes and by supplying covering fire for the ground troops

Her next major deployment was in July 1943, when she took part in the invasion of Sicily. She was one of 18 British, Greek and Polish destroyers which, along with four Royal Navy cruisers, made up the escort for the battleships Nelson, Rodney, Warspite and Valiant, the aircraft carriers Indomitable and Formidable in the Ionian Sea. Inglefield's main role was to search for U-boats and to bombard enemy positions ashore. Throughout the operations on Sicily, she was based at Malta. When the invasion of Italy took place, Inglefield supported the landings at Salerno in a similar way. After the beachhead was established, she formed the escort back to home waters, but was soon sent back to the Mediterranean Sea for operations in Italy. One task was to escort HMS Renown, with British Prime Minister Winston Churchill on board, from Algiers to Alexandria.

During Operation Shingle in early 1944, Inglefield carried out a diversionary bombardment of Civitavecchia to draw Axis forces away from Anzio. She then bombarded the coastal road at Formia for two days before supporting forces on the ground at Anzio. The ship operated out of Naples, ferrying supplies and troops to the battle, as well as continuing to provide covering fire and bombardment of coastal roads.

== Last action ==
On 15 February 1944, she escorted an ammunition ship from Naples to Anzio. She then took up a defensive position to protect the anchorage in Anzio. She was in this capacity for ten days before sustaining a direct hit by a Henschel Hs 293 glider bomb launched by II./KG 100 during a dusk attack and was sunk with the loss of 35 lives. 157 survivors were rescued and returned to the United Kingdom. Among the survivors was Jack Rumbold, the last officer to abandon ship and who was mentioned in dispatches for his actions during the sinking.

== See also ==
- List of ships sunk by missiles

== Bibliography ==
- Colledge, J. J.; Warlow, Ben (2006) [1969]. Ships of the Royal Navy: The Complete Record of All Fighting Ships of the Royal Navy from the 15th Century to the Present (3rd Rev ed.). London: Chatham Publishing. ISBN 978-1-86176-281-8. OCLC 67375475.
- English, John (1993). Amazon to Ivanhoe: British Standard Destroyers of the 1930s. Kendal, England: World Ship Society. ISBN 0-905617-64-9.
- Friedman, Norman (2006). British Destroyers & Frigates: The Second World War and After. Annapolis, Maryland: Naval Institute Press. ISBN 1-86176-137-6.
- Hodges, Peter & Friedman, Norman (1979). Destroyer Weapons of World War 2. Greenwich: Conway Maritime Press. ISBN 978-0-85177-137-3.
- Lenton, H. T. (1998). British & Empire Warships of the Second World War. Annapolis, Maryland: Naval Institute Press. ISBN 1-55750-048-7.
- March, Edgar J. (1966). British Destroyers: A History of Development, 1892-1953; Drawn by Admiralty Permission From Official Records & Returns, Ships' Covers & Building Plans. London: Seeley Service. OCLC 164893555.
- Rohwer, Jürgen (2005). Chronology of the War at Sea 1939–1945: The Naval History of World War Two (Third Revised ed.). Annapolis, Maryland: Naval Institute Press. ISBN 1-59114-119-2.
- Whitley, M. J. (1988). Destroyers of World War Two: An International Encyclopedia. Annapolis, Maryland: Naval Institute Press. ISBN 0-87021-326-1.
