= MV Princess Victoria (1939) =

History
- Name: 1939–1939 MV Princess Victoria; 1939–1940 HMS Princess Victoria
- Owner: 1939–1939: London Midland and Scottish Railway
- Operator: 1939–1939: London and North Western Railway; 1939–1940: Commissioned fleet
- Port of registry: Stranraer
- Route: Stranraer - Larne
- Builder: William Denny and Brothers, Dumbarton
- Yard number: 1333
- Launched: 21 April 1939
- Identification: Official number: 34674
- Fate: Mined and sunk 19 May 1940

General characteristics
- Type: Steel Motor Vessel
- Tonnage: 2,197 GRT
- Length: 322.0 feet (98.1 m)
- Beam: 48.1 feet (14.7 m)
- Depth: 13.0 feet (4.0 m)
- Installed power: 2 Sulzer 7TS48
- Propulsion: 2 screw
- Speed: 19 kn
- Capacity: 875 (1st), 542(3rd), 24-64 cars
- Armament: 244 Mines
- Notes: 1st stern-loading cross channel car ferry; Fitted with bow rudder

MV Princess Victoria was the first British stern-loading cross-channel car ferry. Two months after entering service, it was requisitioned by the Admiralty and converted to a Minelayer. It was sunk by a mine on 19 May 1940.

== Construction ==
The ship was built as a purpose built car and passenger ferry by William Denny & Bros of Dumbarton, Scotland for the London Midland and Scottish Railway. She is understood to have been the first stern loading cross-channel car ferry with a capacity variously quoted at between 24/64/80 cars and with two 20 feet (6.1 m) turntables to assist loading and unloading. Passengers and livestock could be loaded via sidedoors.

The ship and special berthing facilities at Larne and Stranraer cost nearly £200,000.

== Service ==
The ship way allocated to the Stranraer - Larne route and entered service on 8 July 1939.

In September 1939, after just two months service, Princess Victoria was requisitioned and converted to an auxiliary minelayer. She was commissioned as HMS Princess Victoria and given the pennant number M03. She had a capacity of 244 mines. During her short service she laid 2756 mines.

== Fate ==
After laying a minefield off the Dutch coast she struck a mine on the voyage home at the entrance to the Humber Estuary on 19 May 1940 and sank with 36 crew lost and 85 rescued.

== Successor ==
Following the Second World War it was replaced by a near identical ship of the same name built in 1946 which was to sink in the North Channel east of Belfast with 135 fatalities, during the North Sea flood of 1953.
