= HMS Intrepid (D10) =

Destroyer of the Royal Navy

Coordinates: 37°7′N 26°51′E

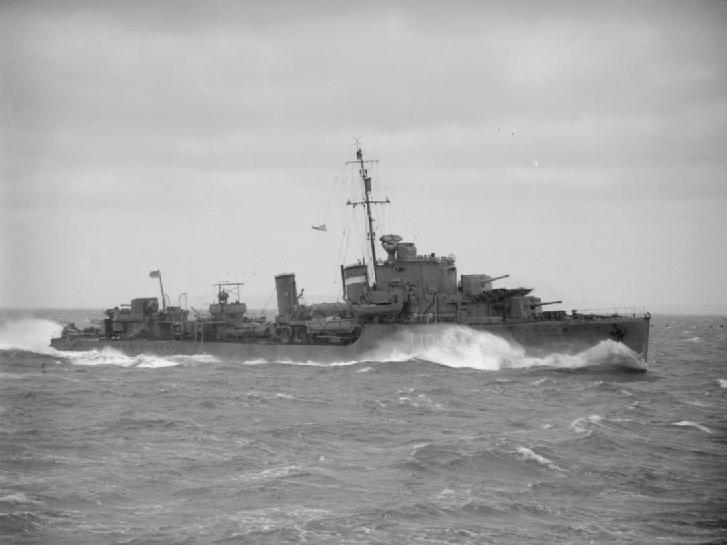

History

United Kingdom
- Name: Intrepid
- Builder: J. Samuel White, Cowes, Isle of Wight
- Laid down: 13 January 1936
- Launched: 17 December 1936
- Identification: Pennant number: D10
- Fate: Sunk by air attack, 27 September 1943

General characteristics (as built)
- Class & type: I-class destroyer
- Displacement: 1,370 long tons (1,390 t) (standard); 1,888 long tons (1,918 t) (deep load)
- Length: 323 ft (98.5 m)
- Beam: 33 ft (10.1 m)
- Draught: 12 ft 6 in (3.8 m)
- Installed power: 3 Admiralty 3-drum boilers; 34,000 shp (25,000 kW)
- Propulsion: 2 shafts, 2 geared steam turbines
- Speed: 35.5 knots (65.7 km/h; 40.9 mph)
- Range: 5,500 nmi (10,200 km; 6,300 mi) at 15 knots (28 km/h; 17 mph)
- Complement: 145
- Sensors & processing systems: ASDIC
- Armament: 4 × single 4.7 in (120 mm) guns; 2 × quadruple 0.5-inch (12.7 mm) machine guns; 2 × quintuple 21 in (533 mm) torpedo tubes; 1 × rack and 2 throwers for 16 depth charges; 60 mines

HMS Intrepid was one of nine I-class destroyers built for the Royal Navy during the 1930s.

== Description ==
The I-class ships were improved versions of the preceding H-class. They displaced 1,370 long tons (1,390 t) at standard load and 1,888 long tons (1,918 t) at deep load. The ships had an overall length of 323 feet (98.5 m), a beam of 33 feet (10.1 m) and a draught of 12 feet 6 inches (3.8 m). They were powered by two Parsons geared steam turbines, each driving one propeller shaft, using steam provided by three Admiralty three-drum boilers. The turbines developed a total of 34,000 shaft horsepower (25,000 kW) and were intended to give a maximum speed of 35.5 knots (65.7 km/h; 40.9 mph). Intrepid only reached a speed of 34.4 knots (63.7 km/h; 39.6 mph) from 33,827 shp (25,225 kW) during her sea trials. The ships carried enough fuel oil to give them a range of 5,500 nautical miles (10,200 km; 6,300 mi) at 15 knots (28 km/h; 17 mph). Their crew numbered 145 officers and ratings.

The ships mounted four 4.7-inch (120 mm) Mark IX guns in single mounts, designated 'A', 'B', 'X' and 'Y' from bow to stern. For anti-aircraft (AA) defence, they had two quadruple mounts for the 0.5 inch Vickers Mark III machine gun. The I class was fitted with two above-water quintuple torpedo tube mounts for 21-inch (533 mm) torpedoes. One depth charge rack and two throwers were fitted; 16 depth charges were originally carried, but this increased to 35 shortly after the war began. Intrepid was one of the four I-class destroyers fitted with minelaying equipment in late 1938 – January 1939 at Malta. This consisted of mounts for rails on the deck on which to carry the mines and an electric winch to move the mines down the rails. A pair of sponsons were added to the stern to allow the mines to clear the propellers when dropped into the sea. 'A' and 'Y' guns and both sets of torpedo tubes were modified to allow them to be removed to compensate for the weight of the mines. The ships could carry a maximum of 72 mines. The I-class ships were fitted with the ASDIC sound detection system to locate submarines underwater.

== Construction and career ==
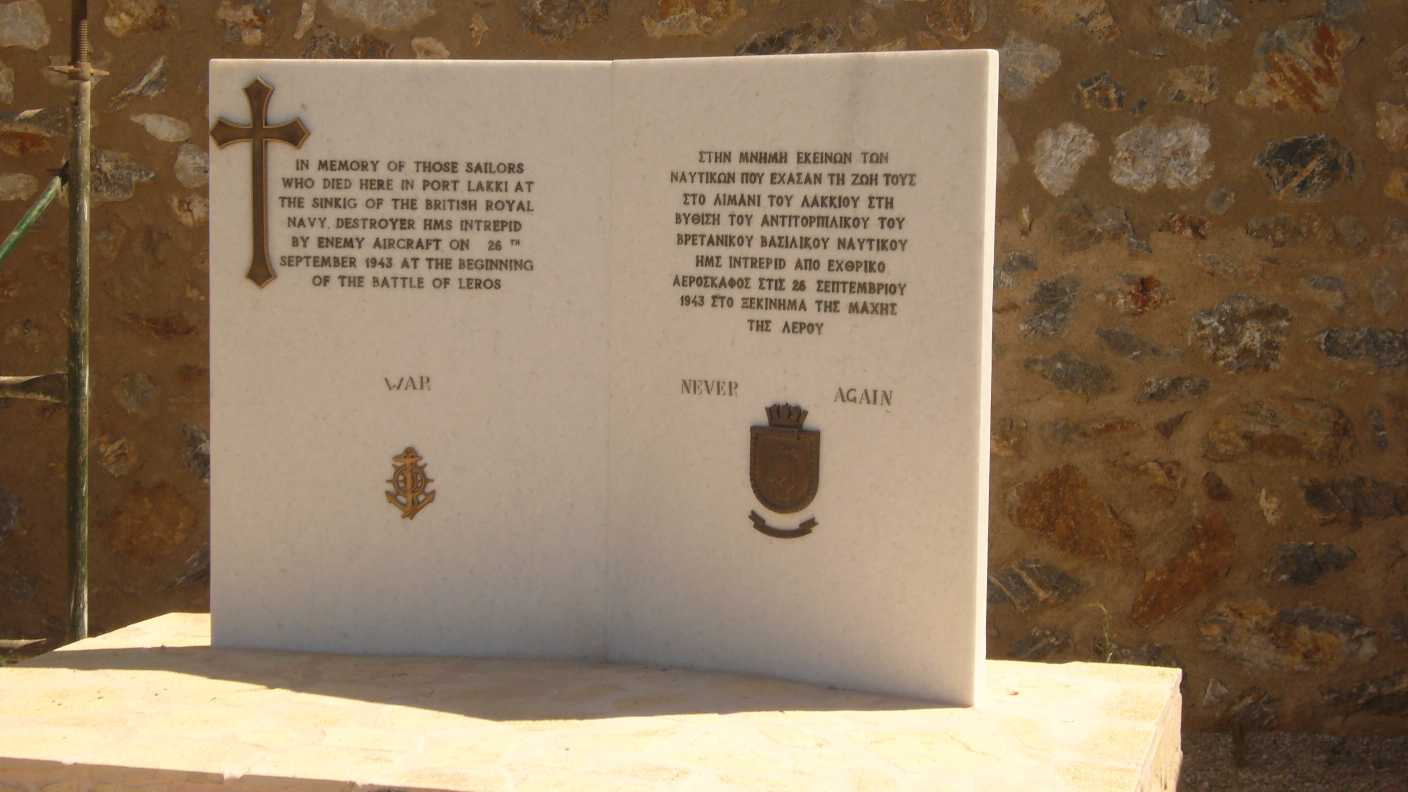
Memorial to Intrepid's crew, in Port Lakki

In the Second World War, Intrepid attacked and sank the U-45 south-west of Ireland on 14 October 1939 in company with the destroyers Ivanhoe and Inglefield. During naval manoeuvres on the 17 March 1940 Intrepid collided with the Leith-based fishing trawler MV Ocean Drift, sinking the smaller ship and killing two of her crew but rescuing the other eight Intrepid participated in the pursuit and destruction of the German battleship Bismarck in May 1941, and in Operation Pedestal, the escorting of a convoy to Malta in August 1942. Intrepid was adopted by the town of Uxbridge in 1942 to raise funds for the ship's costs. Intrepid was attacked by German Junkers Ju 88 aircraft and sank in Leros harbour in the Aegean Sea on 26 September 1943.
