= List of shipwrecks in November 1939 =

The list of shipwrecks in November 1939 includes ships sunk, foundered, grounded, or otherwise lost during November 1939.

== 1 November ==
List of shipwrecks: 1 November 1939
| Ship | State | Description |
|---|---|---|
| Mervyn | United Kingdom | The cargo ship collided with Langleeford (United Kingdom) and sank in the Bristol Channel off St Davids, Pembrokeshire. Four of her crew were killed. |
| Mim | Norway | The cargo ship ran aground on Reef Dyke Skerry, North Ronaldsay, Orkney Islands (59°21′00″N 2°22′16″W). There were no casualties; eleven crew reached shore in their own boat, while the rest were taken off by the Stromness lifeboat. She broke up the next day. |

== 3 November ==
List of shipwrecks: 3 November 1939
| Ship | State | Description |
|---|---|---|
| Canada | Denmark | World War II: The cargo liner struck a mine and sank in the North Sea off Holmpton, Yorkshire (53°42′24″N 0°07′06″E). All 64 crew were rescued by Ringhorn (Norway). The wreck was subsequently dispersed by explosives. |

== 4 November ==
List of shipwrecks: 4 November 1939
| Ship | State | Description |
|---|---|---|
| Nicolaos M. Embiricos | Greece | World War II: The cargo ship struck a mine and sank off the Goodwin Sands, Kent, United Kingdom, near the Sandettie Lightship ( Trinity House) (51°13′N 1°39′E) with the loss of a crew member. Survivors were rescued by the North Goodwin Lightship ( Trinity House) and a Dutch ship. |
| Sig | Norway | World War II: The cargo ship (1,342 GRT, 1924) struck a mine and sank off the mouth of the Humber (53°43′N 0°17′E) with the loss of three of her 19 crew. Survivors were rescued by the fishing boat Ellen M (United Kingdom). |

== 6 November ==
List of shipwrecks: 6 November 1939
| Ship | State | Description |
|---|---|---|
| Hansi | Norway | The cargo ship ran aground in the Orkney Islands, United Kingdom and was wrecked. Her crew survived. |

== 9 November ==
List of shipwrecks: 9 November 1939
| Ship | State | Description |
|---|---|---|
| Carmarthen Coast | United Kingdom | World War II: The coaster struck a mine and sank in the North Sea three nautical miles (5.6 km; 3.5 mi) off Seaham, County Durham with the loss of two of her 17 crew. Survivors were rescued by the Seaham lifeboat. |
| Pacific Coast | United Kingdom | The cargo ship was set on fire by an onboard explosion at Brest, Finistère, France, and was towed out of the port and grounded. Nine crewmen and seven French dockworkers were killed. She was a total loss. |

== 10 November ==
List of shipwrecks: 10 November 1939
| Ship | State | Description |
|---|---|---|
| Éridan | France | The cargo liner ran aground at Port of Spain, Trinidad, and was severely damaged. |
| Ruth Shaw | United States | Carrying a cargo of stone, the barge sank in 85 feet (26 m) of water in the North Atlantic Ocean west of Sandy Hook, New Jersey. |

== 12 November ==
List of shipwrecks: 12 November 1939
| Ship | State | Description |
|---|---|---|
| Arne Kjøde | Norway | World War II: The tanker was torpedoed and damaged in the Atlantic Ocean north east of the Butt of Lewis, Isle of Lewis, United Kingdom (58°51′N 8°07′W) by U-41 (Kriegsmarine) with the loss of five of her 39 crew. She broke in two and was later scuttled by Royal Navy ships. The bow section was taken in tow by HMS Guardian and HMS Isis (both Royal Navy). The crew were rescued by HMS Isis, which shelled and sunk the bow section at 59°06′N 6°55′W on 15 November. The stern section was scuttled by HMS Chitral (Royal Navy) at 59°20′N 7°12′W. |
| HMT Cape Comorin | Royal Navy | The naval trawler (504 GRT, 1936) ran aground at Whitby, Yorkshire and was wrecked. There were no casualties. She was later salvaged, repaired and returned to service. |
| Cresswell | United Kingdom | World War II: The 125.3-foot (38.2 m), 275-ton steam trawler, a sold off Castle-class naval trawler, was shelled and sunk in the Atlantic Ocean 18 miles north northwest of the Flannan Islands (58°39′N 07°36′W) by U-41 (Kriegsmarine) with the loss of six of her 13 crew. Survivors were rescued by U-41 and later transferred to the trawler Phyllisia (United Kingdom). |
| Deerpool | United Kingdom | World War II: The cargo ship ran aground 3 nautical miles (5.6 km) off Spurn Head, Yorkshire and sank. Her crew were rescued. The wreck was dispersed in 1948. |
| Elsie | Finland | The cargo ship (1,410 GRT, 1882) ran aground on Terschelling, Friesland, Netherlands and broke her back. She was declared a total loss. |
| Mecklenburg | Germany | World War II: The cargo ship was intercepted in the Atlantic Ocean north west of the Faroe Islands (62°37′N 10°36′W) by HMS Delhi (Royal Navy). She was scuttled at (63°09′N 11°38′W). All 63 crew were rescued by HMS Delhi. |
| Sumatra | Sweden | World War II: The cargo ship ran aground in Hooghly River 16 nautical miles (30 km) downstream of Calcutta, India. She sank the next day. |

== 13 November ==
List of shipwrecks: 13 November 1939
| Ship | State | Description |
|---|---|---|
| HMS Blanche | Royal Navy | World War II: The B-class destroyer struck a mine and sank in the Thames Estuary with the loss of two of her crew. Survivors were rescued by the tugs Fabia & Lady Brassey and the fishing trawler Kesterel (all United Kingdom). |
| Loire | France | World War II: The cargo ship was torpedoed and sunk in the Mediterranean Sea off Málaga, Spain (36°16′N 2°13′W) by U-26 (Kriegsmarine). All 34 crew and 5 gunners were killed. |
| M 132 | Kriegsmarine | World War II: The minesweeper was damaged in the North Sea off List by the explosion of a depth charge dropped in error by another ship and was beached. She was declared a total loss. There were no casualties. |
| Matra | United Kingdom | World War II: Convoy HXF 7: The cargo ship struck a mine in the North Sea 1 nautical mile (1.9 km) east of the Tongue Lightship ( Trinity House) with the loss of 16 crew. The ship was beached on the Shingles Patch. She was a total loss. |
| Parana | Germany | World War II: The cargo ship was intercepted in the Denmark Strait (65°48′N 25°19′W) by HMS Newcastle (Royal Navy) and was scuttled. Her crew were rescued by HMS Newcastle. |
| Ponzano | United Kingdom | World War II: The cargo ship (1,346 GRT, 1928) struck a mine and sank in the North Sea off Margate, Kent (51°29′N 1°25′E). Her crew were rescued by two Norwegian fishing boats. The wreck was subsequently dispersed by explosives. |
| Sirdhana | United Kingdom | World War II: The cargo ship was sunk by a mine 3 nautical miles (5.6 km) outside Singapore Harbour (1°14′42″N 103°52′36″E) with the loss of 20 lives. Work to demolish the wreck started in June 1952. |

== 14 November ==
List of shipwrecks: 14 November 1939
| Ship | State | Description |
|---|---|---|
| Dryburgh | United Kingdom | The cargo ship struck the sunken wreck of Canada (Denmark) in the North Sea 2 nautical miles (3.7 km) off Holmpton, Yorkshire (53°40′N 0°17′E) and was holed. An attempt was made by Yorkshireman (United Kingdom) to tow and beach her, but she capsized and sank. |
| Maurice-Marguerite | Belgium | World War II: The fishing vessel struck a mine and sank in the North Sea off Gravelines, Nord, France with the loss of three of her crew. |

== 15 November ==
List of shipwrecks: 15 November 1939
| Ship | State | Description |
|---|---|---|
| Alaska | France | World War II: Convoy HX 6: The cargo ship collided with Dotterel (United Kingdom in the English Channel off the Owers Lightship (United Kingdom) (50°30′17″N 0°30′35″W) and sank with the loss of all hands. |
| Africa Shell | United Kingdom | World War II: The cargo ship was shelled and sunk in the Mozambique Channel 160 nautical miles (300 km) north east of Lourenço Marques, Mozambique (24°45′S 35°00′E) by Admiral Graf Spee (Kriegsmarine). |
| Baikal | Soviet Union | The cargo ship struck a rock and sank in the Arctic Sea off Spitsbergen, Norway. |
| Brulin | Canada | The lake freighter (2,241 GRT, 1924) collided with the Canadian Steamship Lines' Huronic in a dense fog. She was repaired and returned to service. |
| Georgios | Greece | The cargo ship struck the wreck of Canada (Denmark) in the North Sea 2 nautical miles (3.7 km) off Holmpton, Yorkshire (53°40′N 0°17′E) and sank. All 23 crew were rescued by the Grimsby lifeboat. |
| Nida | Lithuania | World War II: The cargo ship struck a mine in the Baltic Sea off Tallinn and sank. |
| Panévezys | Lithuania | World War II: The cargo ship struck a mine in Baltic Sea 2 nautical miles (3.7 km) south of the Revelstein Reef and sank. |
| Woodtown | United Kingdom | World War II: The cargo ship struck a mine and sank in the North Sea north of Margate, Kent. Eight lives were lost. |

== 16 November ==
List of shipwrecks: 16 November 1939
| Ship | State | Description |
|---|---|---|
| Arlington Court | United Kingdom | World War II: Convoy SL 7A: The cargo ship straggled behind the convoy. She was torpedoed and sunk in the Atlantic Ocean 230 nautical miles (430 km) south west of Start Point, Cornwall (48°14′N 11°42′W) by U-43 (Kriegsmarine) with the loss of five of her 34 crew. Survivors were rescued by Algenib (Netherlands) and Spinanger (Norway). |
| HMS MTB 6 | Royal Navy | The motor torpedo boat (18/22 t, 1936) was rammed and sunk by HMS Dainty (Royal Navy). |
| Sliedrecht | Netherlands | World War II: The tanker (5,133 GRT, 1924) was torpedoed and sunk in the Atlantic Ocean 200 nautical miles (370 km) south of Rockall, United Kingdom by U-28 (Kriegsmarine) with the loss of 26 of her 31 crew. Survivors were rescued by the trawler Merisia (United Kingdom) the next day. |

== 17 November ==
List of shipwrecks: 17 November 1939
| Ship | State | Description |
|---|---|---|
| Kaunas | Lithuania | World War II: The cargo ship was torpedoed and sunk in the North Sea 6.5 nautical miles (12.0 km) west north west of the Noord Hinder Lightship (Netherlands) by U-57 (Kriegsmarine) with the loss of one of her sixteen crew. |

== 18 November ==
List of shipwrecks: 18 November 1939
| Ship | State | Description |
|---|---|---|
| Blackhill | United Kingdom | World War II: The cargo ship struck a mine and sank in the North Sea off the Longsand Head Lightship ( Trinity House) with the loss of a crew member. Survivors were rescued by HMS Gipsy (Royal Navy). |
| Carica Milica | Yugoslavia | World War II: The cargo ship struck a mine and sank in the North Sea 3.5 nautical miles (6.5 km) north of the Shipwash Lightship ( Trinity House). Her crew were rescued. |
| Parkhill | United Kingdom | World War II: The coaster was torpedoed and sunk in the North Sea (58°07′N 2°18′W) by U-18 (Kriegsmarine) with the loss of all nine crew. |
| Simon Bolivar | Netherlands | World War II: Two magnetic mines sank the ocean liner (8,309 GRT, 1927) in the North Sea off Harwich, Essex, United Kingdom (51°49′N 01°36′E) with the loss of 86 lives. Survivors were rescued by HMT Cape Warwick, HMT Daneman, HMS Greyhound, HMT Lady Elsa, HMT Man o'War, HMT Wellard (all Royal Navy) and Fairplay Two (United Kingdom). Simon Bolivar was on a voyage from Amsterdam, the Netherlands, to Paramaribo, Surinam. |
| Vapaus | Merivoimat | Winter War: The auxiliary gunboat was lost by grounding at Laatokka. |
| Wigmore | United Kingdom | World War II: Convoy IFC: The 140.4-foot (42.8 m), 345-ton fishing trawler was torpedoed and sunk in the North Sea 25 nautical miles (46 km) north by west of Rattray Head, Aberdeenshire (57°59′N 2°06′W) by U-22 (Kriegsmarine) with the loss of all sixteen crew. |

== 19 November ==
List of shipwrecks: 19 November 1939
| Ship | State | Description |
|---|---|---|
| B. O. Borjesson | Sweden | World War II: The cargo ship struck a mine and sank in the North Sea 4.5 nautical miles (8.3 km) off Spurn Head, Yorkshire, United kingdom (53°46′N 0°13′E) with the loss of six crew. Survivors were rescued by the fishing trawler Frascati (United Kingdom) and naval trawler HMT Rose of England (Royal Navy). |
| Bowling | United Kingdom | World War II: The cargo ship was torpedoed and sunk in the North Sea 6 nautical miles (11 km) north north east of the Longstone Lighthouse (55°45′N 1°35′W) by U-13 (Kriegsmarine) with the loss of all thirteen crew. |
| Darino | United Kingdom | World War II: The cargo ship was sunk by torpedo in the Atlantic Ocean off Cape Finisterre, Spain (44°12′N 11°07′W) by U-41 (Kriegsmarine) with the loss of sixteen of her 27 crew. Survivors were rescued by U-41 and later transferred to Caterina Gerolimich (Italy). |
| Grazia | Italy | World War II: The cargo ship struck a mine and sank in the North Sea 5 nautical miles (9.3 km) north of North Foreland, Kent with the loss of six of her 30 crew. Survivors were rescued by HMS Gipsy and HMS Griffin (both Royal Navy). |
| Pensilva | United Kingdom | World War II: Convoy OG 7: The cargo ship straggled behind the convoy. She was torpedoed and sunk in the Bay of Biscay (46°51′N 11°36′W) by U-49 (Kriegsmarine). All aboard were rescued by HMS Echo (Royal Navy). |
| Rhuys | France | World War II: The cargo ship struck a mine and sank in the North Sea 2.5 nautical miles (4.6 km) south of the Humber Lightship ( Trinity House) (53°30′48″N 0°23′07″E) with the loss of sixteen of her 33 crew. |
| Stanbrook | United Kingdom | World War II: The cargo ship was torpedoed and sunk 8 nautical miles (15 km) off the mouth of the River Tyne by U-57 (Kriegsmarine) with the loss of all twenty crew. |
| Torchbearer | United Kingdom | World War II: The cargo ship struck a mine and sank in the North Sea 2 nautical miles (3.7 km) north north east of the Shipwash Lightship ( Trinity House) with the loss of four of her twelve crew. Survivors were rescued by HMS Greyhound (Royal Navy). |

== 20 November ==
List of shipwrecks: 20 November 1939
| Ship | State | Description |
|---|---|---|
| Bertha Fisser | Germany | World War II: The cargo ship was intercepted in the Atlantic Ocean south east of Iceland (64°10′N 15°14′W) by HMS Chitral (Royal Navy) her crew attempted to scuttle her. HMS Chitral rescued them. Bertha Fisser came ashore on the coast of Iceland the next day. |
| Delphine | United Kingdom | World War II: The 125-foot (38 m), 250-ton steam fishing trawler was sunk by shellfire in the Atlantic Ocean 18 nautical miles (33 km) north by east of Tory Island, County Donegal, Ireland, by U-33 (Kriegsmarine). Her crew reached Tory Island 22 hours later in her boat. |
| HMS Mastiff | Royal Navy | World War II: The Basset-class trawler was sunk in the North Sea 1 nautical mile (1.9 km) off the Tongue Lightship ( Trinity House) by the detonation of a German mine the crew was trying to bring on board, with the loss of six crew. Survivors were rescued by HMT Cape Spartel (Royal Navy) and the Margate lifeboat. |
| Sea Sweeper | United Kingdom | World War II: The 136.2-foot (41.5 m), 329-ton steam fishing trawler was shelled and sunk in the Atlantic Ocean 25 nautical miles (46 km) north north west of Tory Island by U-33 (Kriegsmarine). Her crew were rescued by the trawler Lois (United Kingdom) from her boats. |
| Thomas Hankins | United Kingdom | World War II: The 125.7-foot (38.3 m), 276-ton steam trawler, a sold off Castle-class naval trawler, was shelled and sunk in the Atlantic Ocean 14 nautical miles (26 km) north west of Tory Island, County Donegal, Ireland, by U-33 (Kriegsmarine). Her crew were rescued 10 hours later by Esher (United Kingdom). |
| V 209 Gauleiter Telschow | Kriegsmarine | World War II: The vorpostenboot was torpedoed and sunk in the North Sea 100 nautical miles (190 km) west of Helgoland (54°32′N 5°10′E) by HMS Sturgeon (Royal Navy). Twenty-four crew were killed. |

== 21 November ==
List of shipwrecks: 21 November 1939
| Ship | State | Description |
|---|---|---|
| HMS Belfast | Royal Navy | World War II: the Town-class cruiser struck a mine in the Firth of Forth off the Isle of May (56°06′N 2°55′W). She was severely damaged with her back broken and one crew member killed. She was towed to Rosyth, Fife by the tugs Bramham, Bulger, Grangebourne, Krooman and Oxcar (all United Kingdom). Repairs took until November 1942 to complete. |
| HMS Gipsy | Royal Navy | World War II: The G-class destroyer struck a mine and sank in the North Sea off Harwich, Essex with the loss of 30 of her 146 crew. Survivors were rescued by HMS Keith and HMS Griffin (both Royal Navy). |
| Les Barges II | France | World War II: The sold off Castle class trawler was torpedoed, or shelled, and sunk in the Bay of Biscay (45°35′N 3°22′W) by U-41 (Kriegsmarine). All fifteen crew were rescued by the fishing vessel Paz y Trabajo (Spain). |
| Ste. Claire | French Navy | World War II: The auxiliary minesweeper struck a mine and sank in the Strait of Dover 10 nautical miles (19 km) south east of Folkestone, Kent, United Kingdom (51°00′N 1°20′E) with the loss of all eleven crew. |
| Sulby | United Kingdom | World War II: The 130.3-foot (39.7 m), 287-ton steam fishing trawler was shelled and sunk in the Atlantic Ocean 35 nautical miles (65 km) or 75 nautical miles (139 km) north west of Rathlin Island, County Donegal, Ireland (55°27′N 08°01′W) by U-33 (Kriegsmarine). Her Captain and four of her crew disappeared in one of her boats, the other boat made it to Tobermorey in 38 1/2 hours in gale force winds. |
| Tenerife | Germany | World War II: The cargo ship was intercepted in the Atlantic Ocean west of Iceland (62°25′N 20°00′W) by HMS Transylvania (Royal Navy) and was scuttled by her 73 crew, who were rescued by HMS Transylvania. |
| Terukuni Maru | Japan | World War II: The Terukuni Maru-class ocean liner struck a mine and sank in the North Sea 1.5 nautical miles (2.8 km) off the Sunk Lightship ( Trinity House) (51°50′40″N 1°31′04″E). All 206 passengers and crew were rescued. The wreck was subsequently dispersed by explosives. |
| William Humphries | United Kingdom | World War II: The 125-foot (38 m), 276-ton fishing trawler, a sold off Castle-class naval trawler, was shelled and sunk 35 nautical miles (65 km) or 75 nautical miles (139 km) north west of Rathlin Island, County Donegal, Ireland (55°27′N 08°01′W) by U-33 (Kriegsmarine). Her thirteen crew abandoned ship in her boat, but the boat evidently sank and all died. |

== 22 November ==
List of shipwrecks: 22 November 1939
| Ship | State | Description |
|---|---|---|
| Adolph Woermann | Germany | World War II: The cargo ship was scuttled in the Atlantic Ocean off Ascension Island (10°39′S 5°44′W) by her crew when HMS Neptune (Royal Navy) attempted to apprehend her. Her crew were rescued by HMS Neptune. |
| Antiochia | Germany | World War II: The cargo ship was intercepted in the Atlantic Ocean south of Iceland (62°15′N 15°08′W) by HMS Laurentic (Royal Navy) and was scuttled by her crew. |
| HMS Aragonite | Royal Navy | World War II: The naval trawler struck a mine and sank in the North Sea off Deal, Kent. |
| Arijon | France | World War II: The cargo ship was torpedoed and sunk in the Bay of Biscay (45°40′N 4°50′W) by U-43 (Kriegsmarine). Fourteen crew members and two gunners were lost. There were 25 survivors. |
| HMS Bruce | Royal Navy | The Scott-class destroyer was sunk as a target in the English Channel off the Isle of Wight. |
| Elena R. | Greece | World War II: The cargo ship struck a mine and sank in the English Channel 2 nautical miles (3.7 km) south of The Shambles Lightship ( Trinity House) (50°30′N 2°21′W). All 24 crew members reached the lightship. |
| Geraldus | United Kingdom | World War II: The cargo ship struck a mine and sank in the North Sea 3 nautical miles (5.6 km) off the Sunk Lightship (United Kingdom). Survivors were rescued by HMS Wivern (Royal Navy). |
| Lowland | United Kingdom | World War II: The cargo ship struck a mine and sank in the North Sea off Clacton-on-Sea, Essex with the loss of nine of her twelve crew. Survivors were rescued by HMT Myrtle (Royal Navy). |
| Nicolaos Piangos | Greece | The cargo ship collided with Brarena (Norway) in the North Sea and sank. |

== 23 November ==
List of shipwrecks: 23 November 1939
| Ship | State | Description |
|---|---|---|
| Borkum | United Kingdom | World War II: The captured German cargo ship was shelled and damaged in the Atlantic Ocean west north west of the Orkney Islands (59°33′N 3°57′W) by U-33 (Kriegsmarine) with the loss of four German crew. Survivors were rescued by HMT Kingston Beryl and HMT Kingston Onyx (both Royal Navy). Borkum was abandoned and came ashore in Papa Sound, but was declared a total loss. She was refloated on 18 August 1940 and scrapped at Rosyth, Fife in October 1940. |
| Hookwood | United Kingdom | World War II: Convoy FS 40: The cargo ship struck a mine and sank in the North Sea 3.5 nautical miles (6.5 km) east north east of the Tongue Lightship ( Trinity House) with the loss of two of her seventeen crew. Survivors were rescued by HMS Bittern (Royal Navy). |
| HMS Rawalpindi | Royal Navy | World War II: The armed merchant cruiser was shelled and sunk north of the Faroe Islands by the battleships Gneisenau and Scharnhorst (both Kriegsmarine) with the loss of 238 of the 286 people on board. Survivors were rescued by Gneisenau, Scharnhorst, and HMS Chitral (Royal Navy). |

== 24 November ==
List of shipwrecks: 24 November 1939
| Ship | State | Description |
|---|---|---|
| Iris | Sweden | The cargo ship ran aground at Tallinn, Estonia. She was later refloated and temporary repairs were effected for a return to Sweden. She was then laid up. |
| Mangalore | United Kingdom | World War II: The cargo ship struck a mine and sank in the North Sea off Spurn Head Yorkshire. Her 77 crew survived. |
| Pegu | United Kingdom | The cargo liner became stranded in the Crosby Channel, off Liverpool, Lancashire. She broke in two and was declared a total loss. |

== 25 November ==
List of shipwrecks: 25 November 1939
| Ship | State | Description |
|---|---|---|
| Charles Livingston | United Kingdom | The cargo ship came ashore at Ainsdale, Lancashire in a gale with the loss of 23 of her 33 crew. |
| Gerrit Fritzen | Germany | The cargo ship was wrecked on Schiermonnikoog, Friesland, Netherlands. Her crew abandoned ship without casualties. |
| Royston Grange | United Kingdom | World War II: Convoy SL 8B: The cargo ship was torpedoed and sunk in the Atlantic Ocean south west of Cornwall (49°15′N 9°16′W) by U-28 (Kriegsmarine). Her crew were rescued by the trawler Romilly (United Kingdom). |
| Sylvain | Netherlands | World War II: The fishing trawler left port on this date and disappeared in the North Sea with all eleven hands. She was probably sunk by a mine on 25 November. |
| Uskmouth | United Kingdom | World War II: The cargo ship was torpedoed, shelled and sunk in the Atlantic Ocean north west of Cape Finisterre, Spain (43°23′N 11°27′W) by U-43 (Kriegsmarine) with the loss of two of her 25 crew. Survivors were rescued by L'Indomptable (French Navy) and Juventus (Italy). |
| V 301 Weser | Kriegsmarine | World War II: The vorpostenboot struck a mine and sank in the Baltic Sea off Langeland, Denmark. Sixteen crew were reported missing. |

== 26 November ==
List of shipwrecks: 26 November 1939
| Ship | State | Description |
|---|---|---|
| Piłsudski | Poland | World War II: The troopship struck a mine and sank in the North Sea off the mouth of the Humber (53°15′N 0°30′E) with the loss of ten of her 89 crew. Survivors were rescued by HMS Valorous (Royal Navy). |
| Quenast | Belgium | The cargo ship foundered in the North Sea 3 nautical miles (5.6 km) north of the Noord Hinder Lightship (Netherlands) with the loss of three of her five crew. Survivors were rescued by Paris (Norway). |

== 27 November ==
List of shipwrecks: 27 November 1939
| Ship | State | Description |
|---|---|---|
| Gustaf E. Reuter | Sweden | World War II: The tanker was torpedoed and damaged in the Atlantic Ocean 14 nautical miles (26 km) west north west of Fair Isle, United Kingdom, by U-48 (Kriegsmarine) with the loss of one of her 34 crew. She was taken in tow by HMT Kingston Beryl (Royal Navy) but broke in two the next day, with the bow section sinking. The stern section was later scuttled by Royal Navy ships. Survivors were rescued by HMT Kingston Beryl and the Lerwick lifeboat Lady Jane and Martha Ryland ( Royal National Lifeboat Institution). |
| Spaarndam | Netherlands | World War II: The cargo liner struck a mine and sank in the North Sea two nautical miles (3.7 km; 2.3 mi) north east of the Tongue Lightship ( Trinity House) (51°33′05″N 1°24′22″E) with the loss of five lives. |

== 28 November ==
List of shipwrecks: 28 November 1939
| Ship | State | Description |
|---|---|---|
| Birchol | Royal Fleet Auxiliary | The tanker ran aground off South Uist and was wrecked. Her crew survived. |
| Rubislaw | United Kingdom | World War II: The cargo ship struck a mine and sank in the North Sea 1.5 nautical miles (2.8 km) east north east of the Tongue Lightship ( Trinity House) with the loss of thirteen of her crew. Survivors were rescued by a Royal Navy trawler. |
| Waikouaiti | United Kingdom | Waikouaiti The cargo ship ran aground on Dog Island in New Zealand's Foveaux Strait and was wrecked. Her crew survived. |

== 29 November ==
List of shipwrecks: 29 November 1939
| Ship | State | Description |
|---|---|---|
| Ionian | United Kingdom | World War II: Convoy FN 43: The cargo ship struck a mine and sank in the North Sea 1.5 nautical miles (2.8 km) off the Newarp Lightship ( Trinity House) (52°45′15″N 1°56′15″E). All 37 crew were rescued by HMS Hastings (Royal Navy). |
| U-35 | Kriegsmarine | World War II: The Type VIIB submarine (915 GRT) was sunk in the North Sea (60°53′N 2°47′E) by depth charges from HMS Icarus, HMS Kashmir and HMS Kingston (all Royal Navy). All 43 crew were rescued and taken as prisoners of war. |

== 30 November ==
List of shipwrecks: 30 November 1939
| Ship | State | Description |
|---|---|---|
| AV-45 | Finland | Winter War: The Finnish Coast Guard motorboat was shelled and sunk in the Baltic off Lavansaari Island by Gordi (Soviet Navy). All four Coast Guardsmen on board were killed. |
| Jaameri | Finland | Winter War: The coaster sank at Liinahamari. |
| Realf | Norway | World War II: The tanker struck a mine and was damaged in the North Sea south east of Flamborough Head, Yorkshire (53°55′N 0°22′E) with the loss of one of the 43 people on board. Survivors were rescued by Santagata (Italy). Realf sank the next day. |
| Sheaf Crest | United Kingdom | World War II: The cargo ship struck a mine and sank in the North Sea off Margate, Kent (51°32′N 1°26′E) with the loss of one of her 30 crew. Twelve survivors were rescued by ORP Błyskawica (Polish Navy). |
| Syvari | Finland | Winter War: The coaster sank at Liinahamari. |

== Unknown date ==
List of shipwrecks: unknown November 1939
| Ship | State | Description |
|---|---|---|
| Seekum | United States | The fishing vessel was wrecked in Southeast Alaska near Sitka, Territory of Alaska, with the loss of the only person on board. |
