= H5 =

H5, H05 or H-5 may refer to:

== Science ==
- Influenza A virus subtype H5 (disambiguation), all A type viruses containing H5 type of agglutinin
- Histone H5, a histone similar to Histone H1
- Haplogroup H5 (mtDNA), a genetics subgroup
- ATC code H05 Calcium homeostasis, a subgroup of the Anatomical Therapeutic Chemical Classification System
- British NVC community H5
- Hydrogen-5 (H-5), an isotope of hydrogen
- H05, an ICD-10 code for diseases of the eye and adnexa

== Technology ==
- H5 (chronometer), a 1773 marine chronometer designed by John Harrison
- DSC-H5, a full-featured-camera made by Sony
- H5, a hurricane tie manufactured by Simpson Strong-Tie Co
- .h5, filename extension used in Hierarchical Data Format
- <h5></h5>, level 5 heading markup for HTML web pages
- Abbreviation for HTML5, especially when used to create mobile-centric web applications or webpages, in contrast to mini-apps on platforms such as WeChat

== Transportation ==
- H5 Series Shinkansen, a Japanese Shinkansen high-speed train
- H5 Portway, a road part of the Milton Keynes grid road system, England
- Rely H5, a Chinese van
- Hola Airlines (IATA code: H5), a former Spanish airline
- Magadan Airlines (IATA code: H5), a former Russian airline
- SAIC H5, a Chinese battery electric and range extender mid-size SUV

== Military ==
- HMS H5, a 1918 British Royal Navy H-class submarine
- HMS Greyhound (H05), a 1935 British Royal Navy G-class destroyer
- HMS Ithuriel (H05), a 1940 British Royal Navy I-class destroyer
- H-5, a Chinese manufactured variant of the Soviet Ilyushin Il-28 jet bomber
- Sikorsky H-5, a helicopter
- USS H-5 (SS-148), a 1918 United States Navy submarine

== Other uses ==
- H5 (US company), an American electronic discovery company headquartered in San Francisco, California
- H5 (French company), a French video company
- H5 (classification), a para-cycling classification

== See also ==
- Hydrogen-5 (^{5}H), an unstable isotope of hydrogen
- 5H (disambiguation)
