= HH5 =

HH5 or HH-5 may refer to:

- HH5, one of the Hamburger–Hamilton stages in chick development
- HH5, a model in the series of Honda Acty trucks
- Flag in Exile, the fifth novel in the Honor Harrington series by David Weber, abbreviated HH5
- CHD7, also known as HH5, the chromodomain-helicase-DNA-binding protein 7

== See also ==
- H5 (disambiguation)
