= SS Simon Bolivar =

Dutch steamship sunk by a German mine in WW2

History

The Netherlands
- Name: Simon Bolivar
- Namesake: Simón Bolívar
- Owner: KNSM
- Port of registry: Amsterdam
- Route: Amsterdam – Caribbean
- Builder: RDM, Rotterdam
- Yard number: 138
- Laid down: 25 February 1926
- Launched: 15 December 1926
- Completed: 5 March 1927
- Refit: 1930s
- Identification: until 1933: code letters PSDN; by 1934: call sign PHMS
- Fate: mined, 18 November 1939

General characteristics
- Type: passenger-cargo liner
- Tonnage: 7,906 GRT, 4,760 NRT, 8,228 DWT
- Length: 133.65 m (438.5 ft) overall; 130.00 m (426.5 ft) p/p
- Beam: 18.03 m (59.2 ft)
- Draught: 8.23 m (27 ft 0 in)
- Depth: 8.46 m (27.8 ft)
- Decks: 2
- Installed power: 1 × quadruple expansion engine, 4,800 ihp, 856 NHP, 3,529 kW
- Propulsion: 1 × screw
- Speed: 14 knots (26 km/h)
- Capacity: Cargo: 320,000 cu ft (9,100 m^{3}) grain; 290,000 cu ft (8,200 m^{3}) bale; Passengers, as built: 152 × 1st class; 54 × 2nd class; 32 × 3rd class; Passengers, 1930s: 131 × 1st class; 52 × 2nd class; 42 × 3rd class
- Crew: 135
- Sensors & processing systems: by 1930: wireless direction finding

SS Simon Bolivar was a Dutch transatlantic passenger-cargo liner that was built in 1927. Her regular route was between Amsterdam and the Caribbean. Two German magnetic mines sank her in the North Sea in 1939, early in the Second World War, killing more than 80 of the people aboard her. The Netherlands were neutral at the time, but the ship was off the coast of Essex in England. More than 100 of the passengers aboard at the time were Jewish refugees from Nazism.

Simon Bolivar was one of several merchant ships sunk by the same German minefield within the space of a few days. These sinkings led to accusations that Germany had violated the Hague Conventions, by laying mines that failed to minimise the risk to civilian shipping.

== Building ==
Rotterdamsche Droogdok Maatschappij (RDM "Rotterdam Drydock Company)", of Rotterdam as yard number 138. She was laid down on 25 February 1926, launched on 15 December that year, and completed on 5 March 1927. Her owner and operator was the Koninklijke Nederlandse Stoomboot-Maatschappij (KNSM, "Royal Dutch Steamship Company"), who named her after the Venezuelan general and independence leader Simón Bolívar.

Simon Bolivar's lengths were 133.65 m (438.5 ft) overall, and 130.00 m (426.5 ft) between perpendiculars. Her beam was 18.03 m (59.2 ft), her depth was 8.46 m (27.8 ft), and her draught was 8.23 m (27 ft 0 in). Her tonnages were 7,906 GRT, 4,760 NRT, and 8,228 DWT. She had capacity for 320,000 cu ft (9,100 m^{3}) of bulk cargo such as grain, or 290,000 cu ft (8,200 m^{3}) of cargo in bales. As built, she had berths for a total of 238 passengers: 152 in first class, 54 in second class, and 32 in third class. She carried 135 crew.

Simon Bolivar had a single screw, driven by a four-cylinder quadruple expansion steam engine that was built by RDM. It was rated at 856 NHP, 4,800 ihp, or 3,529 kW; and gave her a speed of 14 knots (26 km/h). She had four single-ended boilers, which supplied steam at 225 psi. The boilers had a total of 12 corrugated furnaces, which were oil-fired. She had two funnels.

== Career ==
Film of Simon Bolivar's sea trial in 1927

KNSM registered the ship in Amsterdam. Her code letters were PSDN. By 1930 she was equipped with wireless direction finding. By 1934 her call sign was PHMS, and this had superseded her code letters. At some point in the 1930s, her passenger accommodation was revised. The number of first class berths was reduced; the number of third class berths was increased, and the overall total was reduced from 238 to 225. After the refit, her berths were 131 in first class, 52 in second class, and 42 in third class.

On 17 October 1939, Simon Bolivar left Barbados for Amsterdam. That November, KNSM announced that its passenger motor ship Colombia, which had been on a scheduled route between Europe and the West Indies, would start making 24-day cruises from New York and the Caribbean; calling at Port-au-Prince in Haiti; La Guaira, Puerto Cabello, Pampatar, and Carúpano in Venezuela; Curaçao in the Dutch Antilles; and Trinidad and Barbados in the British Antilles. Simon Bolivar was to join her on a service to the same ports, which would increase the frequency of sailings from New York to fortnightly. Simon Bolivar was scheduled to make her first sailing on this route from New York on 29 December.

At the beginning of November 1939, as Simon Bolivar returned from the Caribbean to the Netherlands, UK maritime authorities detained her in Southampton for eight days. More than half of her cargo was unloaded for inspection, to verify that she was carrying no goods prohibited under the Allied blockade of Germany. After the British had released her, she was expected to reach IJmuiden on 8 November, and dock the next morning at the Surinam Quay in Amsterdam to disembark her passengers.

== Loss ==
On Friday 17 November 1939, Simon Bolivar left Amsterdam for Paramaribo in Surinam. She carried 265 passengers; including Dutch headed for the Dutch Caribbean, British headed for Barbados and Trinidad, and more than 100 German and Austrian Jewish refugees. Many of the Dutch passengers were Bataafse Petroleum Maatschappij (BPM) workers, some of whom were travelling with their wives and children. Most of the refugees were headed for Chile, aided by the Jewish Refugee Relief Committee in Amsterdam.

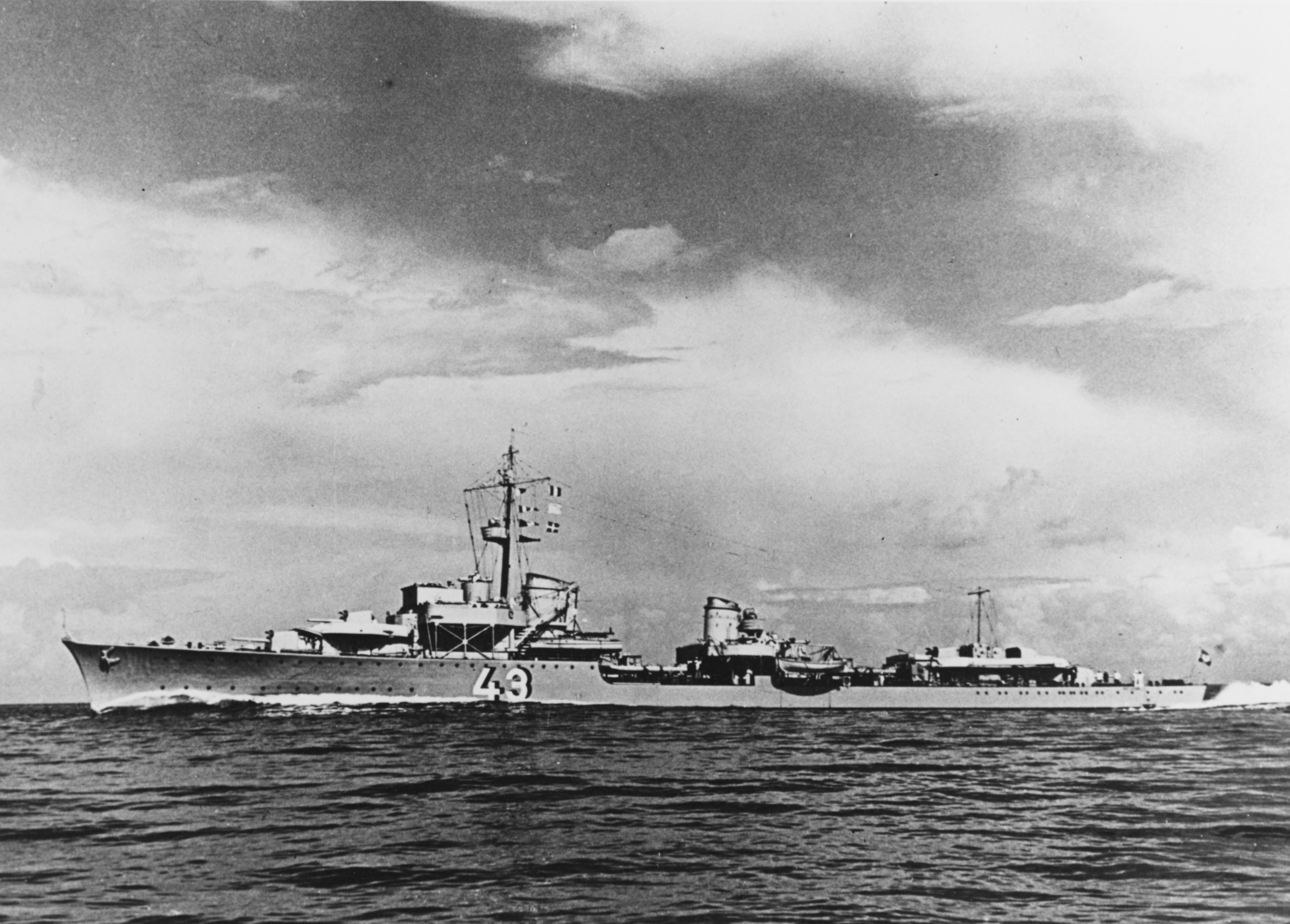
German destroyer Z21 Wilhelm Heidkamp

On the night of 17–18 November, the German destroyers Z11 Bernd von Arnim, Z19 Hermann Künne, and Z21 Wilhelm Heidkamp laid a field of 180 magnetic mines in the Thames Estuary and North Sea. At about 11:30 hrs on Saturday 18 November, a German mine detonated under Simon Bolivar, severely damaging her. The explosion killed a number of people, including her Master, Captain Hendrik Voorspuij, who was on her bridge; and at least two passengers, who were on deck. It also put her wireless telegraph out of action, preventing the transmission of a distress signal. It also ruptured her bunkers, spilling heavy oil into the sea.

Her remaining passengers and crew started to go to their boat stations, and the crew started to lower her starboard lifeboats. This ship listed to starboard, which impeded the lowering of her port lifeboats. Within 15 minutes, a second mine detonated, sinking the ship rapidly in shallow water about 1 nautical mile (2 km) south of the British Sunk lightship, at position 51°49′17.7″N 01°36′44.1″E, and about 13 nautical miles (24 km) off Frinton-on-Sea. Her wreck came to rest on the seabed, with her masts and twin funnels still above water. The explosion of the second mine smashed three lifeboats that were hanging from their davits at the time. Many passengers and crew members were injured by either the force of the explosion, or flying débris such as broken glass. One survivor reported seeing about 80 people in the sea, all covered with fuel oil.

== Rescue ==
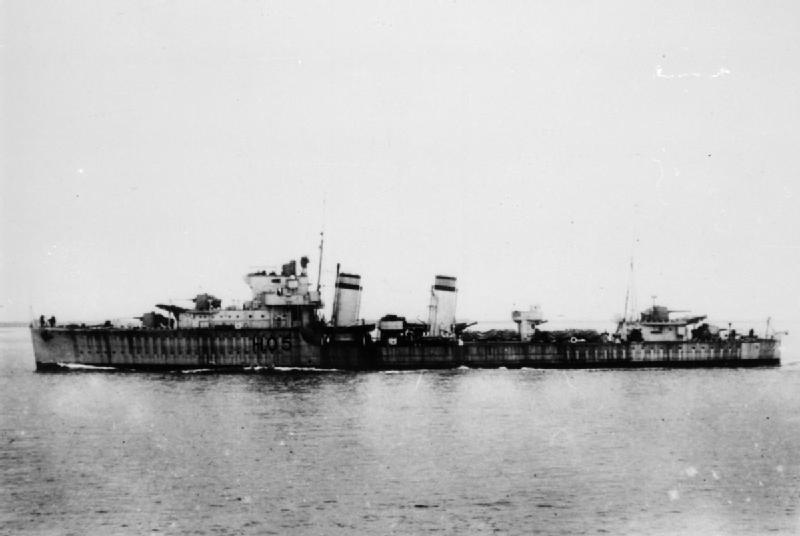
British destroyer HMS Greyhound

The Royal Navy destroyer HMS Greyhound, five anti-submarine naval trawlers, and the civilian tug Fairplay Two came to the rescue. They found at least four lifeboats, plus other survivors in the water or clinging to wreckage. They included a Dominican nun, who had been blown out of a lifeboat by the second mine, and had survived for nearly three hours by clinging to a piece of wood. A British man saved his three-year-old daughter by placing her in a wooden box, in which she floated for an hour as he clung to the box, and secured himself to a rope loop on the edge of a liferaft.

Survivors were landed at Harwich in Essex, where one of the railway stations was turned into a Casualty Clearing Station. Soon after the casualties were landed, there was an air raid warning, and survivors took refuge for about 20 minutes in an air raid shelter under the restaurant of the railway station. 32 injured survivors were hospitalised in Harwich, and the remainder were cared for at an hôtel. 230 adults, 15 children, and six babies were then taken by train from Harwich to London, where medical staff and a dozen ambulances and cars awaited them at Liverpool Street station. 63 of the survivors were taken to hospital in London. At least some of them seem to have been taken to St Bartholomew's Hospital, including 13 of the German and Austrian refugees.

== Aftermath ==
At first, it was feared that Simon Bolivar's sinking had killed 140 people. A few days later, the death toll was revised to 84 or 85. By 23 November, the bodies of three of the dead from Simon Bolivar had been washed ashore on the English coast. They were of two women and a man, and the body of one of the women was found at Dover. On 28 November, one of Simon Bolivar's liferafts was washed ashore at Katwijk aan Zee on the Dutch coast. The raft had capacity for 12 people, but was empty.

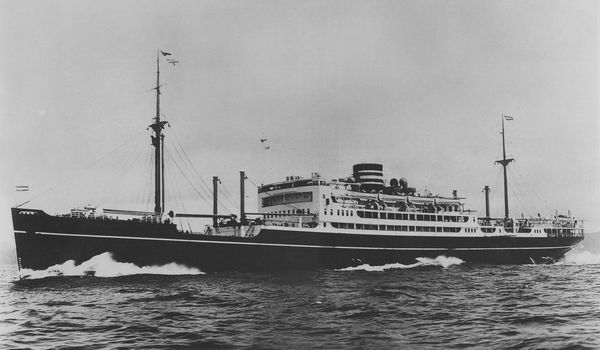
Japanese liner Terukuni Maru

Simon Bolivar was the fifth neutral Dutch ship to have been sunk since the war began on 1 September, and the largest to date. Previous Dutch losses included the Holland America Line cargo ship Binnendijk, which had been mined on 5 October. Over the next few days, German mines sank several other ships in the same part of the North Sea, including the Japanese cargo liner Terukuni Maru and the destroyer HMS Gipsy, both on 21 November.

Also on 21 November, the Leader of the Opposition, the Labour MP Clement Attlee, asked Prime Minister Neville Chamberlain whether the German mine-laying violated the Hague Conventions, which forbade laying naval mines in commercial shipping lanes. Chamberlain agreed that it did, and announced that the UK would retaliate by seizing German exports on the high seas, as it had done in the First World War. Another Labour MP, Ellen Wilkinson, asked whether Germany was using magnetic mines. Chamberlain replied that no definite opinion could yet be expressed on the matter.

Germany denied that it had laid the mines. A gale had washed a number of mines ashore in Belgium, where two of them had exploded, so it was suggested that the storm had torn British mines from their moorings. However, two days later, as the number of ships sunk by German mines increased, a German public radio broadcast commented "The results are rather sad for neutral ships. Germany regrets this development as far as neutral ships are affected, but she is unable to do anything about it. The harvest must be reaped."

== Survivors ==
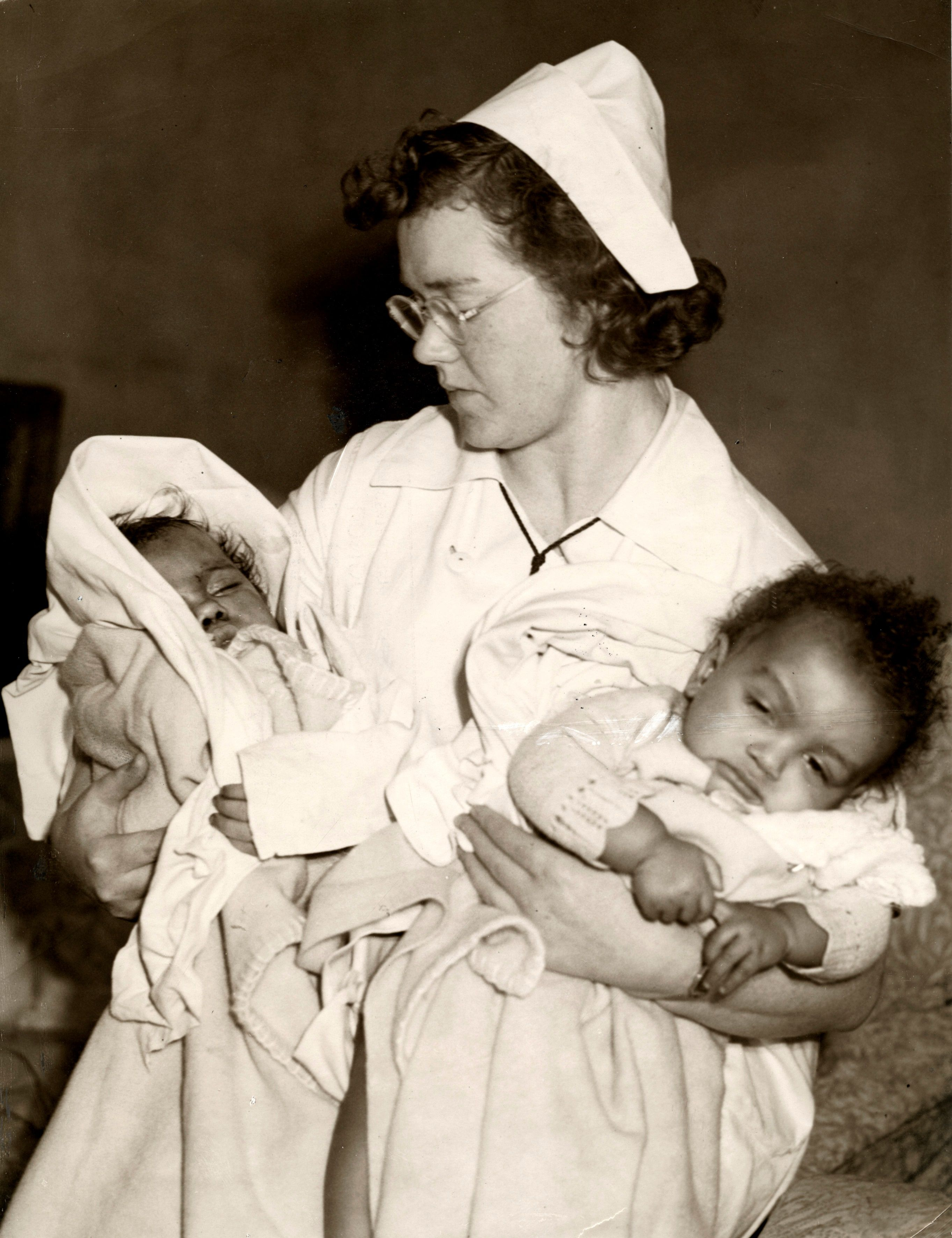
Two babies who survived the sinking of the Simon Bolivar

Film of some of Simon Bolivar's survivors returning to the Netherlands: the Dominican nuns by KLM airliner to Schiphol, and a larger group aboard the ship Oranje Nassau to Vlissingen

Some of the first Dutch survivors from Simon Bolivar to return to the Netherlands were four Dominican nuns, who on 20 November flew home by KLM from England to Schiphol. On 24 November, the oil company BPM used three aircraft to fly 50 survivors home from Shoreham-by-Sea on the English coast to Schiphol: 24 men, 13 women, and 13 children. One of the planes was a scheduled service; BPM chartered the other two. On 25 November, other Dutch survivors returned home by sea. The Stoomvaart Maatschappij Zeeland passenger steamship Oranje Nassau brought 69 members of the crew and about 20 passengers to Vlissingen. Nederlandse Spoorwegen was to run an extra diesel train for them from Vlissingen to Amsterdam, calling en route at Roosendaal, Dordrecht, Rotterdam, the Hague, and Haarlem. Another 17 or 18 survivors were due to return from England aboard a Batavier Line ship to Rotterdam, Seven survivors who had been injured in the sinking, and had recuperated enough to travel, reached Amsterdam on 29 November aboard the KNSM steamship Van Rensselaer. They were six crew members, and one passenger.

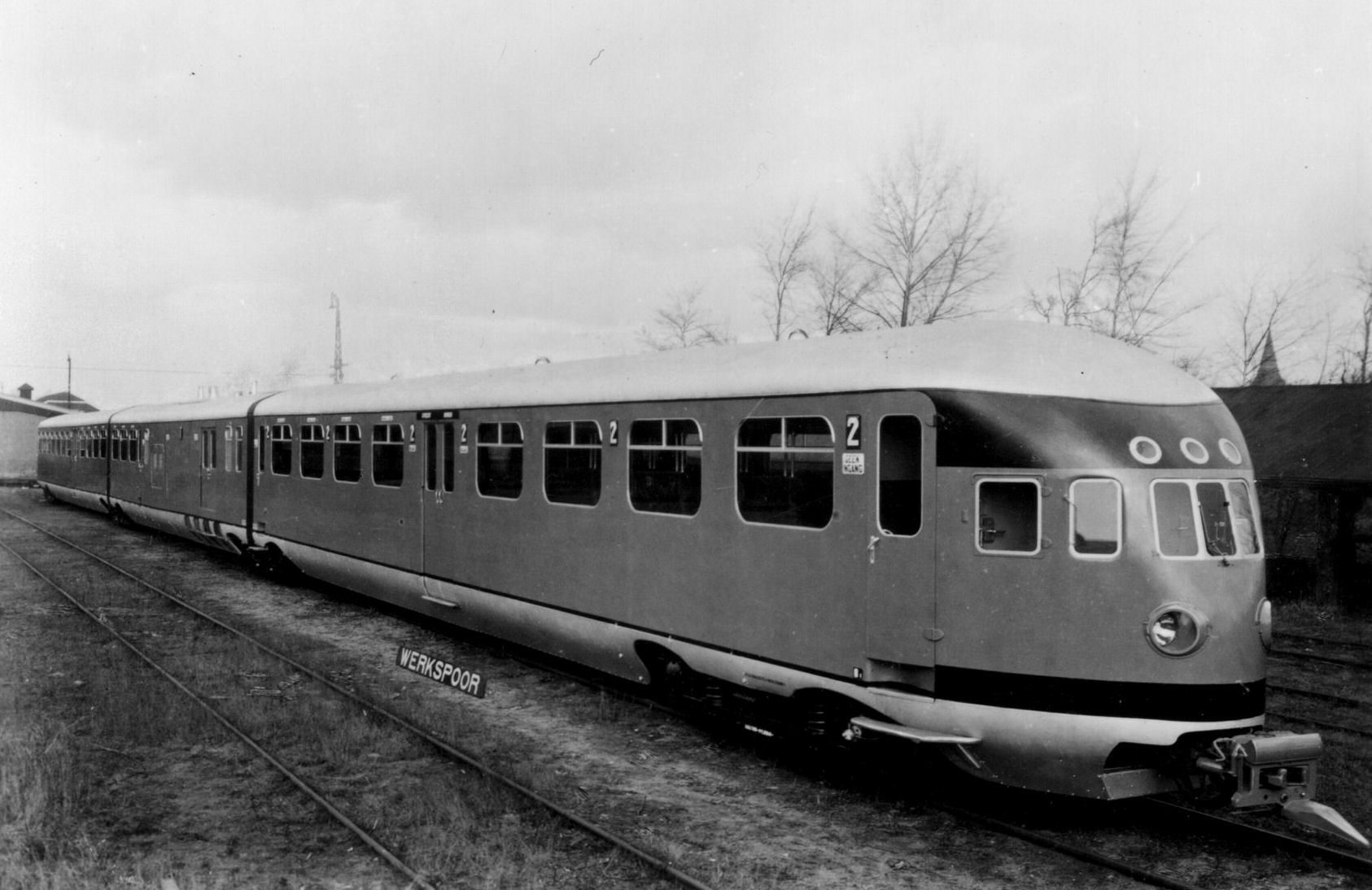
A Dieseldrie train: the type that carried survivors from Vlissingen to Amsterdam on 25 November

Some of the injured survivors had been admitted to the Essex County Hospital in Colchester. On 29 November, six of them were well enough to be discharged, but another 11 remained as inpatients.

The Dutch and Jewish survivors arrived in England as foreign nationals without permission to enter the UK. The Jewish passengers were German citizens, and thus enemy aliens under UK law, even though they were refugees fleeing Nazism. British police kept them under strict supervision, including those hospitalised in St Bartholomew's. They were terrified of being sent back to the Netherlands, both because of the dangers of another wartime sea voyage, and also because of the risk of Germany invading the Netherlands. The HIAS-ICA Emigration Association tried to contact the Jewish Refugee Relief Committee in Amsterdam for a full list of refugees aboard Simon Bolivar, and a list of all those who had survived.

== Wreck ==
Simon Bolivar's wreck, lying in shallow water and partly above the surface of the sea, was a hazard to navigation for two decades. In April 1940 the Admiralty charted it as a "non-dangerous wreck". In 1959 it was dispersed to a depth of 45 feet (14 m). In 1961 the wreck was surveyed, and parts of it were found to foul at a depth of 41 feet (12 m). By then, the wreck was broken up, and scattered over an area 600 feet (180 m) long. Since then, some surveys have failed to find the wreck, possibly due to drifting sands covering it. Other surveys have found the wreck in a broken condition. A survey in 1982 found the wreck to foul at a depth of 41 feet (12.5 m) A survey in 2016 found the wreck covered by sand, with its highest part 51 feet (15.5 m) below the surface of the sea. As of 2016, the wreck was near the Trinity buoy.

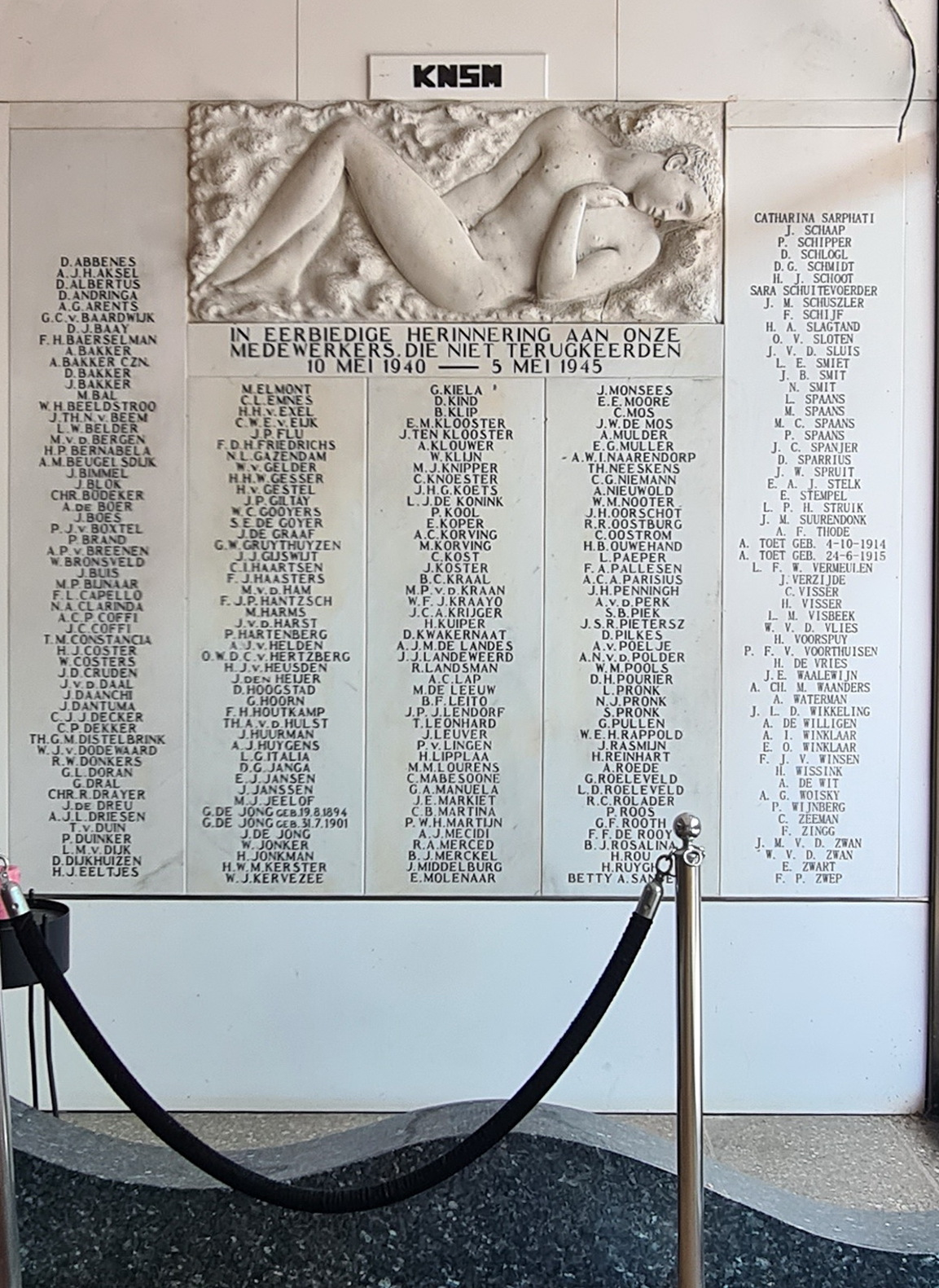
KNSM war monument in Amsterdam

== Graves and monument ==
One member of Simon Bolivar's crew, steward Leendert Vermeulen, is buried in the Old Cemetery at Ipswich, Suffolk. Another, boatswain Cornelis Zeeman, was reburied after the war in the Dutch war graves section of Mill Hill Cemetery, which is now in North London.

In 1947, a stone monument to all KNSM personnel killed in the Second World War was installed in the Scheepvaarthuis in Amsterdam. The monument has since been relocated, and is now in the Kompaszaal on KNSM Island in Amsterdam.

== Bibliography ==
- "Eens varende op de „Simon Bolivar"..." De Telegraaf (in Dutch). Amsterdam. 21 November 1939. p. 1 – via Delpher.
- "De ramp van het passagierschip „Simon Bolivar"". Keesings Historisch Archief (in Dutch). No. 441. Amsterdam. 18 November 1939. p. 3025 – via Delpher.
- Lloyd's Register of Shipping. Vol. II.–Steamers and Motorships. London: Lloyd's Register of Shipping. 1928 – via Internet Archive.
- Lloyd's Register of Shipping (PDF). Vol. II.–Steamers and Motorships of 300 tons gross and over. London: Lloyd's Register of Shipping. 1930 – via Southampton City Council.
- Lloyd's Register of Shipping (PDF). Vol. II.–Steamers and Motorships of 300 tons gross and over. London: Lloyd's Register of Shipping. 1934 – via Southampton City Council.
- Whitley, MJ (1991). German Destroyers of World War Two. Annapolis, MD: Naval Institute Press. ISBN 978-1-55750-302-2.
