= Influenza A virus subtype H5 =

Influenza A virus subtype H5 may refer to one of nine subtypes of Influenza A virus:

- Influenza A virus subtype H5N1
- Influenza A virus subtype H5N2
- Influenza A virus subtype H5N3
- Influenza A virus subtype H5N4
- Influenza A virus subtype H5N5
- Influenza A virus subtype H5N6
- Influenza A virus subtype H5N7
- Influenza A virus subtype H5N8
- Influenza A virus subtype H5N9
