= German submarine U-33 (1936) =

German World War II submarine

Coordinates: 55°25′N 05°07′W

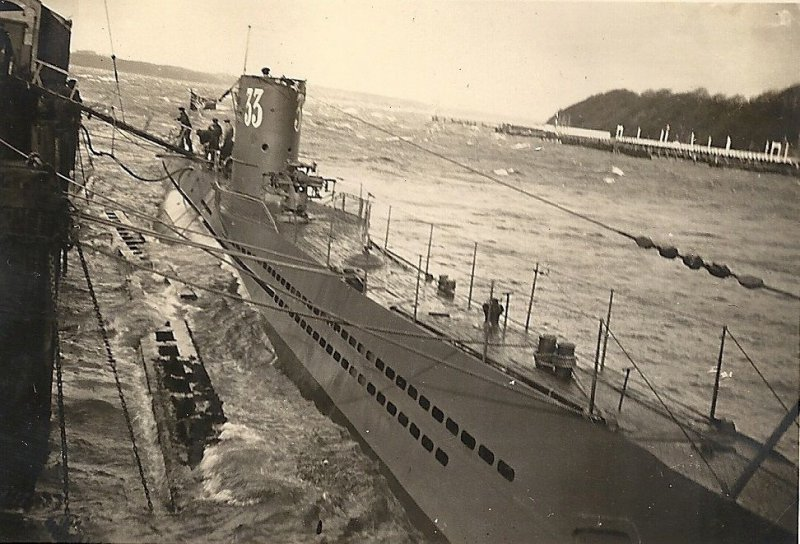
- U-33 in 1937. Note that the boat's number is still visible on the conning tower. It was painted out at the beginning of the war

History

Nazi Germany
- Name: U-33
- Ordered: 25 March 1935
- Builder: Germaniawerft, Kiel
- Cost: 4,189,000 Reichsmark
- Yard number: 556
- Laid down: 1 September 1935
- Launched: 11 June 1936
- Commissioned: 25 July 1936
- Fate: Sunk, 12 February 1940

General characteristics
- Class & type: Type VIIA submarine
- Displacement: 626 tonnes (616 long tons) surfaced; 745 t (733 long tons) submerged
- Length: 64.51 m (211 ft 8 in) o/a; 45.50 m (149 ft 3 in) pressure hull
- Beam: 5.85 m (19 ft 2 in) o/a; 4.70 m (15 ft 5 in) pressure hull
- Height: 9.50 m (31 ft 2 in)
- Draught: 4.37 m (14 ft 4 in)
- Installed power: 2,100–2,310 PS (1,540–1,700 kW; 2,070–2,280 bhp) (diesels); 750 PS (550 kW; 740 shp) (electric)
- Propulsion: 2 shafts; 2 × diesel engines; 2 × electric motors
- Speed: 17 knots (31 km/h; 20 mph) surfaced; 8 knots (15 km/h; 9.2 mph) submerged
- Range: 6,200 nmi (11,500 km; 7,100 mi) at 10 knots (19 km/h; 12 mph) surfaced; 73–94 nmi (135–174 km; 84–108 mi) at 4 knots (7.4 km/h; 4.6 mph) submerged
- Test depth: 220 m (720 ft); Crush depth: 230–250 m (750–820 ft)
- Complement: 4 officers, 40–56 enlisted
- Sensors & processing systems: Gruppenhorchgerät
- Armament: 5 × 53.3 cm (21 in) torpedo tubes (four bow, one stern); 11 × torpedoes or 22 TMA mines; 1 × 8.8 cm (3.46 in) deck gun (220 rounds); 1 × 2 cm (0.79 in) AA gun

Service record
- Part of: 2nd U-boat Flotilla; 25 July 1936 – 12 February 1940
- Identification codes: M 28 962
- Commanders: Kptlt. Ottoheinrich Junker; 25 July 1936 – 28 October 1938; Kptlt. Kurt Freiwald; 22 November – 20 December 1936; 3 June – 25 July 1937; Kptlt. Hans-Wilhelm von Dresky; 29 October 1938 – 12 February 1940
- Operations: 3 patrols: 1st patrol: 19 August – 28 September 1939; 2nd patrol: 29 October – 26 November 1939; 3rd patrol: 5 – 12 February 1940
- Victories: 10 merchant ships sunk (19,261 GRT); 1 merchant ship total loss (3,670 GRT)

German submarine U-33 was a Type VIIA U-boat of Nazi Germany's Kriegsmarine during World War II.

Her keel was laid down on 1 September 1935 at the Germaniawerft in Kiel. She was launched on 11 June 1936 and commissioned on 25 July with Ottoheinrich Junker in command. He was relieved by Kurt Freiwald on 22 November. Kapitänleutnant (Kptlt.) Hans-Wilhelm von Dresky took over on 29 October 1938 and commanded the boat until her loss.

Rotors from Kriegsmarine's Enigma machine were captured from the survivors, the wiring of which was unknown at that time to British codebreakers at Bletchley Park.

== Design ==
As one of the first ten German Type VII submarines later designated as Type VIIA submarines, U-33 had a displacement of 626 tonnes (616 long tons) when at the surface and 745 tonnes (733 long tons) while submerged. She had a total length of 64.51 m (211 ft 8 in), a pressure hull length of 45.50 m (149 ft 3 in), a beam of 5.85 m (19 ft 2 in), a height of 9.50 m (31 ft 2 in), and a draught of 4.37 m (14 ft 4 in). The submarine was powered by two MAN M 6 V 40/46 four-stroke, six-cylinder diesel engines producing a total of 2,100 to 2,310 metric horsepower (1,540 to 1,700 kW; 2,070 to 2,280 shp) for use while surfaced, two BBC GG UB 720/8 double-acting electric motors producing a total of 750 metric horsepower (550 kW; 740 shp) for use while submerged. She had two shafts and two 1.23 m (4 ft) propellers. The boat was capable of operating at depths of up to 230 metres (750 ft).

The submarine had a maximum surface speed of 17 knots (31 km/h; 20 mph) and a maximum submerged speed of 8 knots (15 km/h; 9.2 mph). When submerged, the boat could operate for 73–94 nautical miles (135–174 km; 84–108 mi) at 4 knots (7.4 km/h; 4.6 mph); when surfaced, she could travel 6,200 nautical miles (11,500 km; 7,100 mi) at 10 knots (19 km/h; 12 mph). U-33 was fitted with five 53.3 cm (21 in) torpedo tubes (four fitted at the bow and one at the stern), eleven torpedoes, one 8.8 cm (3.46 in) SK C/35 naval gun, 220 rounds, and an anti-aircraft gun. The boat had a complement of between forty-four and sixty.

== Service history ==
U-33 took part in Operation Ursula — the German submarine operation in support of Franco's naval forces during the Spanish Civil War from November 1936.

During World War II, U-33 sank 10 ships for a total of 19,261 gross register tons (GRT) in just three war patrols.

On Monday, 20 November 1939 she sank three British steam trawlers. At 10:30 am, Thomas Hankins 14 miles north-west of Tory Island; at 4:00 pm, Delphine 18 miles north-northeast of Tory and at 5:05 pm Sea Sweeper 25 miles west-northwest of Tory. The crew of Thomas Hankins, under the master, M. Hankins, was rescued by another trawler ten hours later and landed in Northern Ireland. They reported that they had been shelled without warning. The second shell went through the bows and the fifth through the boiler, causing the trawler to sink in about 25 minutes.

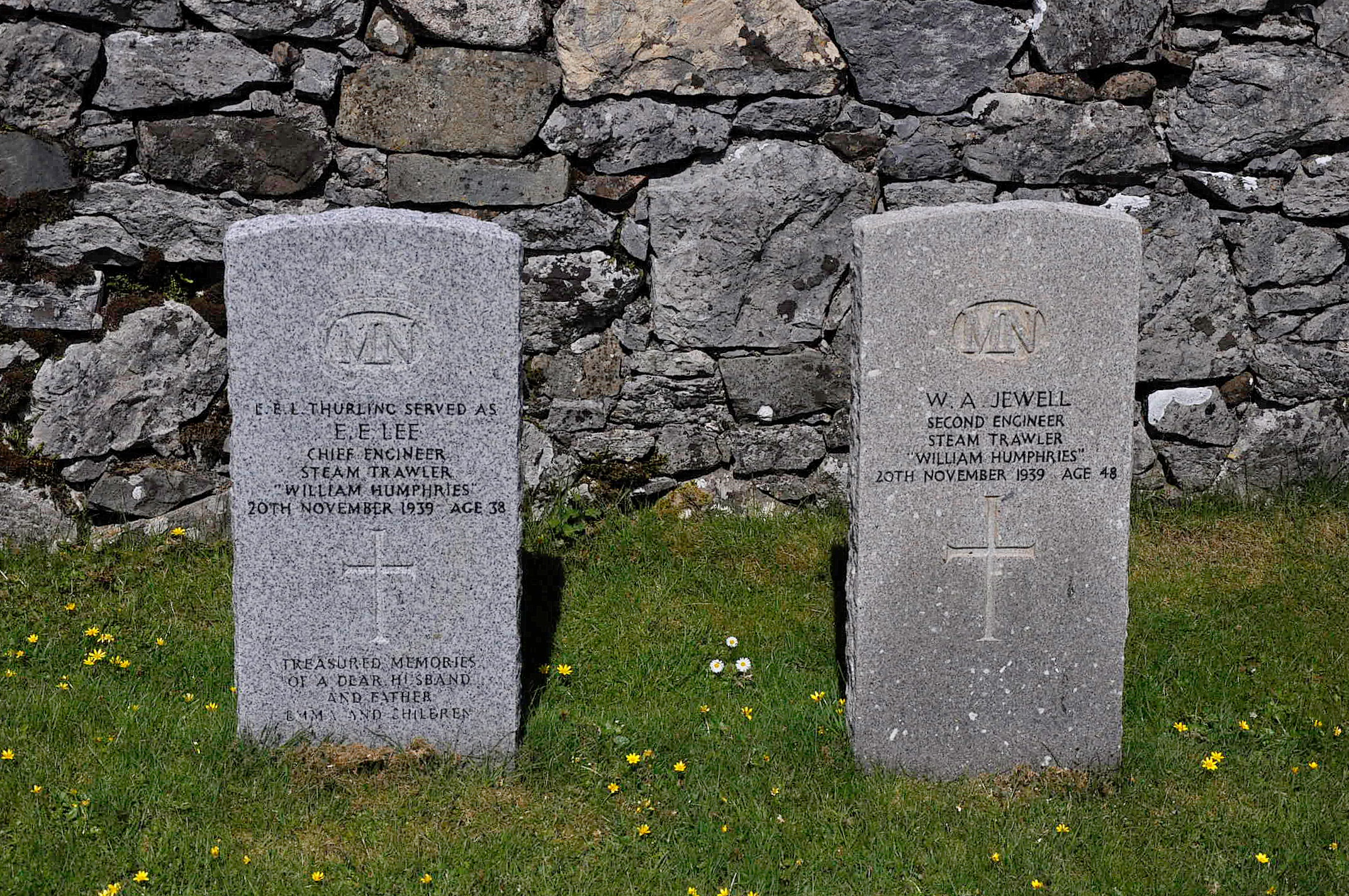
Graves of two crewmen of William Humphries

On Tuesday, 21 November 1939 at 08:30 in rough seas, the trawler FD87 Sulby (from Fleetwood), was sunk by gunfire from U-33 75–80 miles north-west of Rathlin Island. The crew had just managed to launch and push off the two lifeboats as the submarine fired two shells into the trawler amidships and she sank within two minutes. The U-boat commander pointed at the crew as they rowed from their ship and laughed. One of the lifeboats, whose occupants were Harold Blackburn, James Hay, James William Geddes (of Buckie, Banffshire, Scotland), Fred Brunt, Augustus Lewis, Sydney Mellish and Jack Threlfall were picked up the following day by the Tobermory lifeboat. The other lifeboat was lost with five men including the Skipper, Clarence Hudson; Mate John Michael (Jack) Dawson; and deck hands Raymond Randles, James Wood and R.A. Lister.

William Humphries

An hour or so later at the same location, U-33 sank another trawler, William Humphries. The entire crew of 13 men were lost. Three bodies washed ashore at Isle of Skye, and two of them were buried in the graveyard of Cill Chriosd on the Isle of Skye: Chief Engineer E.E.L. Thurling (served as E.E. Lee) - Chief Engineer, and W. A. Jewell - Second Engineer.

The body of the skipper, Charles Horace Bridge, washed up and was buried on Canna. Bridge was 38 years old and came from Fleetwood, Lancashire. He was washed up below Compass Hill on 29 November 1939, an event that was recorded by the owner of Canna, John Lorne Campbell, in his diary.

Two additional bodies were washed up and buried on Barra.

== Fate ==
In February 1940, U-33, then captained by Hans-Wilhelm von Dresky, had been ordered to lay mines in the Firth of Clyde, in Scotland. However, the minesweeper HMS Gleaner, captained by Lieutenant-Commander Hugh Price, detected the U-boat on the 12th and dropped depth charges over a period of several hours. Eventually, the damaged U-33 was forced to surface and the crew abandoned the boat, which sank soon afterward. 25 men died while 17 survived. Before the boat was abandoned, its secret Enigma rotors were distributed amongst a few of the crew, who were instructed to release them into the sea to avoid capture. This was not done, however, and as a result the British captured three rotors, including two (VI and VII), used only by the Kriegsmarine and for which the wiring was previously unknown.

== Summary of raiding history ==
Date	Name of ship	Nationality	Tonnage (GRT)	Fate
7 September 1939	Olivegrove	United Kingdom	4,060	Sunk
16 September 1939	Arkelside	United Kingdom	1,567	Sunk
24 September 1939	Caldew	United Kingdom	287	Sunk
20 November 1939	Delphine	United Kingdom	250	Sunk
20 November 1939	Sea Sweeper	United Kingdom	329	Sunk
20 November 1939	Thomas Hankins	United Kingdom	276	Sunk
21 November 1939	Sulby	United Kingdom	287	Sunk
21 November 1939	William Humphries	United Kingdom	276	Sunk
23 November 1939	Borkum	United Kingdom	3,670	Total loss
25 December 1939	Stanholme	United Kingdom	2,473	Sunk (mine)
16 January 1940	Inverdargle	United Kingdom	9,456	Sunk (mine)

== Bibliography ==
- Busch, Rainer; Röll, Hans-Joachim (1999). German U-boat commanders of World War II : a biographical dictionary. Translated by Brooks, Geoffrey. London, Annapolis, Md: Greenhill Books, Naval Institute Press. ISBN 1-55750-186-6.
- Busch, Rainer; Röll, Hans-Joachim (1999). Der U-Boot-Krieg, 1939-1945: Deutsche U-Boot-Verluste von September 1939 bis Mai 1945 [German U-boat losses from September 1939 to May 1945] (in German). Vol. IV. Hamburg, Berlin, Bonn: Mittler. ISBN 3-8132-0514-2.
- Edwards, Bernard (1996). Dönitz and the Wolf Packs - The U-boats at War. Cassell Military Classics. p. 19. ISBN 0-304-35203-9.
- Gröner, Erich; Jung, Dieter; Maass, Martin (1991). U-boats and Mine Warfare Vessels. German Warships 1815–1945. Vol. 2. Translated by Thomas, Keith; Magowan, Rachel. London: Conway Maritime Press. ISBN 0-85177-593-4.
- David Kahn, Seizing the Enigma, 1991, pp. 104–112.
- Kemp, Paul (1999). U-Boats Destroyed - German Submarine Losses in the World Wars. London: Arms & Armour. ISBN 1-85409-515-3.
- Hugh Sebag-Montefiore, Enigma: The Battle for the Code, 2000, pp. 67–77, ISBN 0-7538-1130-8
- Sulby sinking information from Statements to the Secretary of the Fleetwood Steam Trawlers Association Limited and a newspaper cutting from the time.
