= 5H =

5H or 5h may refer to:

- Fifth Harmony, the American girl group
- 5H, a type of lead in a pencil
- SSH 5H (WA), alternate designation for Washington State Route 507
- Fly540 (IATA code)
- ^{5}H, a highly unstable isotope of hydrogen
- City of Death (production code: 5H), a 1979 Doctor Who serial

== See also ==
- H5 (disambiguation)
