= German submarine U-41 (1939) =

German World War II submarine

Coordinates: 49°20′N 10°04′W

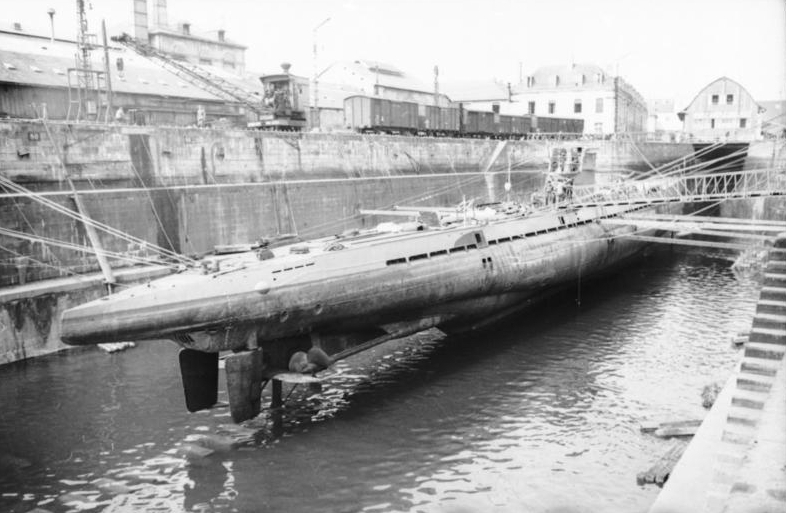
- U-37, (an identical U-boat to U-41) at Lorient in 1940

History

Nazi Germany
- Name: U-41
- Ordered: 21 November 1936
- Builder: DeSchiMAG AG Weser, Bremen
- Yard number: 946
- Laid down: 27 November 1937
- Launched: 28 January 1939
- Commissioned: 22 April 1939
- Fate: Sunk on 5 February 1940

General characteristics
- Class & type: Type IXA submarine
- Displacement: 1,032 t (1,016 long tons) surfaced; 1,153 t (1,135 long tons) submerged
- Length: 76.50 m (251 ft) o/a; 58.75 m (192 ft 9 in) pressure hull
- Beam: 6.51 m (21 ft 4 in) o/a; 4.40 m (14 ft 5 in) pressure hull
- Height: 9.40 m (30 ft 10 in)
- Draught: 4.70 m (15 ft 5 in)
- Installed power: 4,400 PS (3,200 kW; 4,300 bhp) (diesels); 1,000 PS (740 kW; 990 shp) (electric)
- Propulsion: 2 shafts; 2 × diesel engines; 2 × electric motors
- Speed: 18.2 knots (33.7 km/h; 20.9 mph) surfaced; 7.7 knots (14.3 km/h; 8.9 mph) submerged
- Range: 10,500 nmi (19,400 km; 12,100 mi) at 10 knots (19 km/h; 12 mph) surfaced; 65–78 nmi (120–144 km; 75–90 mi) at 4 knots (7.4 km/h; 4.6 mph) submerged
- Test depth: 230 m (750 ft)
- Complement: 4 officers, 44 enlisted
- Armament: 6 × torpedo tubes (4 bow, 2 stern); 22 × 53.3 cm (21 in) torpedoes; 1 × 10.5 cm SK C/32 naval gun (180 rounds); 1 × 3.7 cm (1.5 in) SK C/30 AA gun; 1 × twin 2 cm FlaK 30 AA guns

Service record
- Part of: 6th U-boat Flotilla; 22 April – 31 December 1939; 2nd U-boat Flotilla; 1 January – 5 February 1940
- Identification codes: M 11 423
- Commanders: Kptlt. Gustav-Adolf Mugler; 22 April 1939 – 5 February 1940
- Operations: 3 patrols: 1st patrol: 19 August – 17 September 1939; 2nd patrol: a. 7 November – 7 December 1939; b. 23 – 24 Jan 1940; 3rd patrol: 27 January – 5 February 1940
- Victories: 5 merchant ships sunk (22,815 GRT); 1 merchant ship damaged (8,096 GRT); 2 merchant ships taken as prize (2,073 GRT)

The German submarine U-41 was a Type IXA U-boat of Nazi Germany's Kriegsmarine that operated during World War II. She conducted three war patrols during her short career, two as part of the 6th U-boat Flotilla and one as part of the 2nd flotilla. U-41 also sank five enemy vessels for a total of 22,815 gross register tons (GRT); captured two more for a total of 2,073 GRT and damaged one other of 8,096 GRT.

On 5 February 1940, U-41 was hit by depth charges from the British A class destroyer HMS Antelope after sinking two enemy merchant vessels and was sunk off the south coast of Ireland. All 49 of her crew members were lost with the boat.

== Design ==
As one of the eight original Type IX submarines, later designated IXA, U-41 had a displacement of 1,032 tonnes (1,016 long tons) when at the surface and 1,153 tonnes (1,135 long tons) while submerged. The U-boat had a total length of 76.50 m (251 ft), a pressure hull length of 58.75 m (192 ft 9 in), a beam of 6.51 m (21 ft 4 in), a height of 9.40 m (30 ft 10 in), and a draught of 4.70 m (15 ft 5 in). The submarine was powered by two MAN M 9 V 40/46 supercharged four-stroke, nine-cylinder diesel engines producing a total of 4,400 metric horsepower (3,240 kW; 4,340 shp) for use while surfaced, two Siemens-Schuckert 2 GU 345/34 double-acting electric motors producing a total of 1,000 metric horsepower (740 kW; 990 shp) for use while submerged. She had two shafts and two 1.92 m (6 ft) propellers. The boat was capable of operating at depths of up to 230 metres (750 ft).

The submarine had a maximum surface speed of 18.2 knots (33.7 km/h; 20.9 mph) and a maximum submerged speed of 7.7 knots (14.3 km/h; 8.9 mph). When submerged, the boat could operate for 65–78 nautical miles (120–144 km; 75–90 mi) at 4 knots (7.4 km/h; 4.6 mph); when surfaced, she could travel 10,500 nautical miles (19,400 km; 12,100 mi) at 10 knots (19 km/h; 12 mph). U-41 was fitted with six 53.3 cm (21 in) torpedo tubes (four fitted at the bow and two at the stern), 22 torpedoes, one 10.5 cm (4.13 in) SK C/32 naval gun, 180 rounds, and a 3.7 cm (1.5 in) SK C/30 as well as a 2 cm (0.79 in) C/30 anti-aircraft gun. The boat had a complement of forty-eight.

== Service history ==
U-41 was ordered by the Kriegsmarine on 21 November 1936 (as part of Plan Z and in violation of the Treaty of Versailles). She was laid down on 27 November 1937 by AG Weser, Bremen as yard number 946. She was launched on 28 January 1939 and commissioned on 22 April of that same year under the command of Oberleutnant zur See Gustav-Adolf Mugler.

During her service in the Kriegsmarine, U-41 sank five commercial ships for 22,815 gross register tons (GRT); damaged one commercial vessel of 8,096 GRT and captured two ships totalling 2,073 GRT.

=== First patrol ===
U-41 left Wilhelmshaven on 19 August 1939, before World War II began, with then Oblt. Gustav Adolf-Mugler in command. Her first patrol involved traveling as far south as Portugal after entering the North Sea and circumnavigating the British Isles. During this patrol, two ships were captured: the Finnish Vega, of 974 GRT, and the 1,099 GRT Suomen Poika. U-41 then returned to Wilhelmshaven, arriving on 17 September 1939.

=== Second patrol ===
U-41 left Wilhelmshaven with Mugler in command once again on 7 November 1939. On 12 November, both the 275 GRT British vessel Cresswell and the 11,019 GRT Norwegian ship Arne Kjøde were sunk by torpedoes. The 1,351 GRT British merchant vessel Darino went to the bottom on the 19th. The last enemy vessel to be sunk by U-41 was the French vessel Les Barges II. She displaced a total of 296 GRT and was sunk by a single torpedo on 21 November. The U-boat then returned to port on 7 December 1939.

=== Third patrol ===
U-41 left the port of Helgoland on 27 January 1940 with Mugler still in command. During her final patrol, one enemy ship was sunk and one was damaged; both of these attacks took place on 5 February. The first ship that was hit was the 8,096 GRT Dutch vessel Ceronia. The Ceronia was damaged and the 9,874 GRT British ship Beaverburn was sunk. Nevertheless, U-41 did not return to her home port, she was sunk on the same day.

=== Fate ===
Following the attacks on the Dutch Ceronia and the British Beaverburn on 5 February 1940, U-41 was attacked by the British A class destroyer HMS Antelope with depth charges. She was hit and sunk off the south coast of Ireland. All 49 of her crew members were lost with the boat during the attack.

== Summary of raiding history ==
Date	Ship	Nationality	Tonnage	Fate
16 September 1939	Suomen Poika	Finland	1,099	Captured as prize
16 September 1939	Vega	Finland	974	Captured as prize
12 November 1939	Arne Kjøde	Norway	11,019	Sunk
12 November 1939	Cresswell	United Kingdom	275	Sunk
19 November 1939	Darino	United Kingdom	1,351	Sunk
21 November 1939	Les Barges II	France	296	Sunk
5 February 1940	Beaverburn	United Kingdom	9,874	Sunk
5 February 1940	Ceronia	Netherlands	8,096	Damaged

== Bibliography ==
- Busch, Rainer; Röll, Hans-Joachim (1999). German U-boat commanders of World War II : a biographical dictionary. Translated by Brooks, Geoffrey. London, Annapolis, Md: Greenhill Books, Naval Institute Press. ISBN 1-55750-186-6.
- Busch, Rainer; Röll, Hans-Joachim (1999). Deutsche U-Boot-Verluste von September 1939 bis Mai 1945 [German U-boat losses from September 1939 to May 1945]. Der U-Boot-Krieg (in German). Vol. IV. Hamburg, Berlin, Bonn: Mittler. ISBN 3-8132-0514-2.
- Gröner, Erich; Jung, Dieter; Maass, Martin (1991). U-boats and Mine Warfare Vessels. German Warships 1815–1945. Vol. 2. Translated by Thomas, Keith; Magowan, Rachel. London: Conway Maritime Press. ISBN 0-85177-593-4.
- Kemp, Paul (1999). U-Boats Destroyed – German Submarine Losses in the World Wars. London: Arms & Armour. ISBN 1-85409-515-3.
