= Caldew (trawler) =

British steam fishing trawler

History

United Kingdom
- Name: Maristo
- Owner: James Thomas, Milford Haven
- Port of registry: Milford Haven, Wales
- Builder: Smith's Dock Company Ltd., North Shields
- Yard number: 580
- Launched: 10 May 1914
- Completed: November 1914
- In service: 1914–1917
- Identification: M14
- Fate: Requisitioned by Royal Navy as a minesweeper, December 1915
- Notes: Sold to Wyre Steam Trawling Co. Ltd., 16 October 1917

Royal Navy
- Name: HMT Maristo
- Operator: Royal Navy
- Acquired: December 1915
- In service: 1915–1919
- Home port: Portsmouth, England
- Identification: No.1978
- Fate: Returned to owners September 1919

United Kingdom
- Name: Caldew
- Owner: Wyre Steam Trawling Co. Ltd., Fleetwood; St. Andrew´s Steam Fishing Co Ltd., Fleetwood
- Port of registry: Fleetwood, England
- Acquired: 16 October 1917
- In service: 1917–1939
- Identification: FD347
- Fate: Sunk, 24 September 1939

General characteristics
- Tonnage: 257 GRT; 115 NRT
- Length: 129.7 ft (39.5 m)
- Beam: 23.5 ft (7.2 m)
- Height: 12.7 ft (3.9 m)
- Propulsion: 97 hp (72 kW) T.3-cylinder by Smith's Dock Company Ltd., Middlesbrough
- Crew: 10 (1914); 12 (1939)
- Armament: 1 × 12-pounder gun

Caldew was a British steam fishing trawler. Launched in 1914 as Maristo, she was requisitioned by the Royal Navy for service in the First World War the following year. Maristo survived the war and resumed trawling for the next two decades, being renamed Caldew in that time. She collided with fellow trawler Ospray II in 1935, sinking the latter ship.

On 27 September 1939, four weeks after the outbreak of the Second World War, Caldew was intercepted by the German submarine U-33 on a normal fishing trip south of the Faroe Islands. The submarine proceeded to order the trawler's crew into a lifeboat, after which Caldew was sunk by U-33's deck gun. The crew were rescued but were captured by a German destroyer, who interned them in Germany. The crew of Caldew were not liberated until the end of the war, and were the only British fishermen to be taken prisoner during the war.

== Construction and design ==
Maristo (Official Number 128769) was constructed in North Shields by Smith's Dock Company Ltd., who also constructed the 97-horsepower (72 kW) T.3-cylinder engine. The steam trawler measured 257 gross register tons (GRT) and 115 net register tons (NRT), with a length of 129.7 ft (39.5 m), a beam of 23.5 ft (7.2 m), and a height of 12.7 ft (3.9 m). Maristo was launched on 10 May 1914 and was registered in Milford Haven by owner James Thomas on 6 November of the same year.

== History ==
=== Early service ===
In December 1915, a year after Maristo's registration, the trawler was requisitioned by the Royal Navy for active service in the First World War. During the conflict, the trawler was based at Portland as an armed trawler with a 12-pounder gun. At some point in 1917, Caldew claimed an unconfirmed kill on a German submarine along with the armed trawler HMT Caliph. The trawler was sold to Wyre Steam Trawling Co. Ltd of Fleetwood on 26 October 1917 and was returned to the company in September 1919, ten months after the end of the war. Maristo had been renamed Caldew by 30 September 1921, as she was registered at Fleetwood under the latter name on that day.

On 14 February 1931, Caldew, along with fellow trawlers Dhoon and River Clyde, responded to a distress call made by the Finnish steamship Malve, which had run aground on the island of Tiree in gale-force snowstorm. The three trawlers stood by to assist, but Malve refloated in a flood tide and was anchored in Balephetrish Bay Tyree. She dragged anchor in a gale the next day and was driven ashore on rocks and abandoned by its crew, a Total Loss. 4 years later, on 6 April 1935, Caldew collided with fellow Fleetwood trawler Ospray II while trawling south of Gigha. The collision tore a large hole in the Ospray II, causing fatal damage and leading to the trawler's sinking less than an hour later. The two skippers of the trawlers were blamed in an inquiry for not keeping watch at the time of the collision, and both had their certificates of competence revoked for a year. The Caldew was sold to St. Andrew's Steam Fishing Co Ltd. in 1938.

=== Sinking ===
On 16 September 1939, fifteen days after the outbreak of the Second World War, Caldew, captained by Skipper Thomas Kane with twelve crewmen on board, set sail from Fleetwood to the Faroe Islands fishing grounds. After landing one of the crew members in the Faroes on 21 September, the ship began to trawl off the island chain. On 24 September, Caldew was stopped by the German submarine U-33 south of the Faroes. The crew were ordered to sail away from the ship in a lifeboat, after which the trawler was sunk by the German submarine's 8.8 cm SK C/35 naval gun at 60.47°N 6.20°W. Caldew's crew were rescued by the Swedish steamer Kronprinsessan Margaeta, which itself was intercepted by the German destroyer Friedrich Ihn and torpedo boat Iltis on 27 September. The destroyer interned the crew and transported them to Germany, where they were held at Sandbostel and Milag 8 prisoner of war camps. Skipper Kane and three hands were repatriated in prisoner exchanges during the war, while the remainder of the crew were liberated at the end of the war. Caldew was the forty-second ship and the fifth trawler to be sunk by U-boats during the war, while the crew were the first Allied seamen and only British fishermen to be taken prisoner by German forces during the war.
