= Influenza A virus subtype H5N9 =

H5N9 is a subtype of the species Influenza A virus (sometimes called bird flu virus). Wild aquatic birds are the primary host of the influenza A virus, which is enzootic (continually present) in many bird populations.

== Outbreaks ==
A highly pathogenic strain of H5N9 caused an outbreak in 1966 in Ontario and Manitoba, Canada in turkeys, resulting in the slaughter of approximately 8,000 birds.

In 1999 an H5 influenza A virus was isolated from a mallard in the Netherlands.

In 2008 An H5N9 virus was isolated from poultry in Aomori, Japan.

In December 2015 an H5N9 virus infected a flock of 500 ducks raised for fatty liver production experienced a 5% mortality in Arrosès, France.

In 2025 another highly pathogenic strain caused an outbreak in a duck farm in Merced County, California, forcing the culling of over 118,000 ducks. This strain may have arisen from recombination of H5N1 from the current 2020–2025 H5N1 outbreak and a subtype bearing N9.
