= SS Kaunas =

History
- Name: (Norway) Dixie (1931); (Norway) Vardefjell (1931-1938); (Lithuania) Kaunas (1938-1939)
- Owner: Akc-Vé Lietuvos Baltijos Lloydas
- Builder: Porsgrund Mekaniske Vaerksted
- Yard number: 93
- Launched: 29 January 1931
- Completed: July 1931
- Identification: LYKC
- Fate: Torpedoed and sunk 17 November 1939

General characteristics
- Type: Cargo ship
- Tonnage: 1,566 GRT
- Length: 77.7 metres (254 ft 11 in)
- Beam: 11.6 metres (38 ft 1 in)
- Depth: 6.2 metres (20 ft 4 in)
- Installed power: 1 x 4-cyl. compound engine
- Propulsion: Screw propeller
- Speed: 10 knots
- Crew: 16

SS Kaunas was a Lithuanian Cargo ship that was torpedoed by the German submarine U-57 in the North Sea 6.5 nautical miles (12.0 km) west north west of the Noord Hinder Lightship on 17 November 1939 while she was travelling from Ghent, Belgium to Hartlepool, United Kingdom in ballast.

== Construction ==
Kaunas was launched on 29 January 1931 and completed in July of the same year at the Porsgrund Mekaniske Vaerksted shipyard in Porsgrunn, Norway. The ship was 77.7 metres (254 ft 11 in) long, had a beam of 11.6 metres (38 ft 1 in) and had a depth of 6.2 metres (20 ft 4 in). She was assessed at 1,566 GRT and had 1 x 4-cyl. compound engine driving a single screw propeller. The ship could generate 66 n.h.p. with a speed of 10 knots.

== Sinking ==
The neutral Kaunas was travelling unescorted from Ghent, Belgium to Hartlepool, United Kingdom in ballast when on 17 November 1939 at 20.15 pm, she was hit amidships by a G7e torpedo from the German submarine German submarine U-57 in the North Sea 6.5 nautical miles (12.0 km) west north west of the Noord Hinder Lightship without warning as the U-boat crew couldn't find any visible nationality markings. She sank stern first in seven minutes with the loss of one crew member. The 15 survivors escaped the ship in two lifeboats and were rescued later that day.

== Wreck ==
The wreck of Kaunas lies at (52°05′N 02°30′E).
