= Haplogroup H5 (mtDNA) =

Human mitochondrial DNA haplogroup

- Possible time of origin: 11,500 Years ago (9500 BC)
- Possible place of origin: Middle East/Western Caucasus
- Ancestor: H5'36
- Descendants: H5a
- Defining mutations: C456T, T16304C

In human mitochondrial genetics, Haplogroup H5 is a human mitochondrial DNA (mtDNA) haplogroup descended from Haplogroup H (mtDNA). H5 is defined by T16304C in the HVR1 region and 456 in the HVR2 region.

== Origin ==
H5 has been dated to around 11,500 BP (9500 BC). It appears to be most frequent and diverse in the Western Caucasus, so an origin there has been suggested, while its subclade H5a appears European. However, samples of mtDNA with T16304C in the HVR1 region have been found in four individuals of around 6800 BC from the Pre-Pottery Neolithic B site of Tell Halula, Syria, suggesting that H5 may have arrived in the Caucasus with farmers from the Near East.

== Distribution ==
H5* is present at low levels (1%–3%) throughout the Near East. H5* is most frequent in the Caucasus, forming over 20% of the haplogroup H gene pool in Karatchaians-Balkarians and Georgians – people living in the immediate vicinity of the two sides of the High Caucasus. In Europe estimated levels vary from a total absence in Volga-Uralic Finno-Ugrians to 8% in Slovaks and French. However the level generally averages around 5%. Although some research gives the highest levels of H5 concentration throughout Europe as being in Wales. (8.5%)

== Alzheimer's disease ==
Mitochondria are key regulators of cell survival and death. The most recent report about a possible link between Alzheimer's disease (AD) and mtDNA genotypes might show evidence for subhaplogroup H5 as a risk factor for late onset AD.

== Subclade H5a ==
H5a, the first subclade of H5 to be named, is defined by T4336C in the control region and has its own subclades, including H5a1 and H5a2. H5a is thought to be around 7,000–8,000 years old; in other words, the mutation T4336C probably occurred c. 5500 BC. It is fairly evenly distributed at low levels across Europe. The average in samples from Austria, Germany, Hungary, Macedonia , and Romania was 2.4%. Yet it is almost absent from the Caucasus and the Near East, suggesting a European origin. Although it was initially thought to have its highest level on the central European plain, more recent research has shown the highest levels in Iberia, the Balkans and Finno-Scandia. The British Isles was excluded from the latter study, but the former showed that H5a does occur there.

Álvarez-Iglesias et al. observed a frequency peak for H5a in the Franco-Cantabrian region decreasing towards East Europe and commented that "This is compatible with a process of demographic repopulation of Europe after the LGM period centered in this climatic and geographic refuge." However such a scenario would be too early for the date of c. 5500 BC. calculated by Luísa Pereira, Martin Richards, Ana Goios, et al. So a later dissemination across Europe would appear more likely if the dating is correct.

=== Ancient DNA ===
Studies of ancient DNA have found H5 in four individuals of around 6800 BC from the Pre-pottery Neolithic B site of Tell Halula, Syria. H5a has been found in a Tagar (800 BC–100 AD) man on the Russian steppe whose Y-DNA was R1a1a and in Margrethe, 11th century AD Queen of Denmark.

== Subclade H5a1 ==
The subclade H5a1 is defined by the additional transition C15833T. It appears to occur fairly evenly across Europe at slightly lower levels than its parent. The population average in samples from Austria, Germany, Hungary, Macedonia and Romania was 1.8%. In very large sample of the population of the Austrian Tyrol, H5a1 was found in 2%, whereas H5a was found at 2.9%. Peng et al. (2018) found H5a1 in 2% (1/50) of a sample of Pamiris from Gorno-Badakhshan Autonomous Region of Tajikistan and in 1.9% (1/54) of a sample of Kyrgyz from Artux.

== Tree ==
This phylogenetic tree of haplogroup H5 subclades is drawn from Mannis van Oven, PhyloTree.

- H5'36
  - H5
    - H5a
      - H5a1
        - H5a1a
        - H5a1b
        - H5a1c
          - H5a1c1
            - H5a1c1a
          - H5a1c2
        - H5a1d
        - H5a1e
        - H5a1f
        - H5a1g
          - H5a1g1
            - H5a1g1a
          - H5a1g2
        - H5a1h
        - H5a1i
        - H5a1j
        - H5a1k
        - H5a1m
        - H5a1n
        - H5a1p
        - H5a1q
      - H5a2
        - H5a2a
      - H5a3
        - H5a3a
          - H5a3a1
          - H5a3a2
          - H5a3a3
        - H5a3b
      - H5a4
        - H5a4a
          - H5a4a1
            - H5a4a1a
      - H5a5
      - H5a6
        - H5a6a
      - H5a7
      - H5a8
      - H5a9
    - H5b
      - H5b1
      - H5b2
      - H5b3
      - H5b4
      - H5b5
    - H5c
      - H5c1
        - H5c1a
        - H5c1b
      - H5c2
    - H5d
    - H5e
      - H5e1
      - H5e1a
        - H5e1a1
      - H5e1b
    - H5f
    - H5g
    - H5h
    - H5i
    - H5j
    - H5k
    - H5l
    - H5m
    - H5n
    - H5o
    - H5p
    - H5-C16192T
      - H5q
    - H5-T16311C!
      - H5r
        - H5r1
        - H5r2
      - H5s
      - H5t
    - H5u
      - H5u1
    - H5-G709A
      - H5v

== Notable members ==
- Thaddeus Taube belongs to a mtDNA haplogroup within the H5'36 cluster, which in his ethnic group always indicates varieties of H5, rather than H36 or the parental level H5'36, when complete sequencing is performed.
- Alan Dershowitz carries haplogroup H5.

== See also ==
- Genealogical DNA test
- Genetic genealogy
- Human mitochondrial genetics
- Population genetics
- Human mitochondrial DNA haplogroups
