= HMS Greyhound (H05) =

British G-class destroyer

Coordinates: 36°00′N 23°10′E

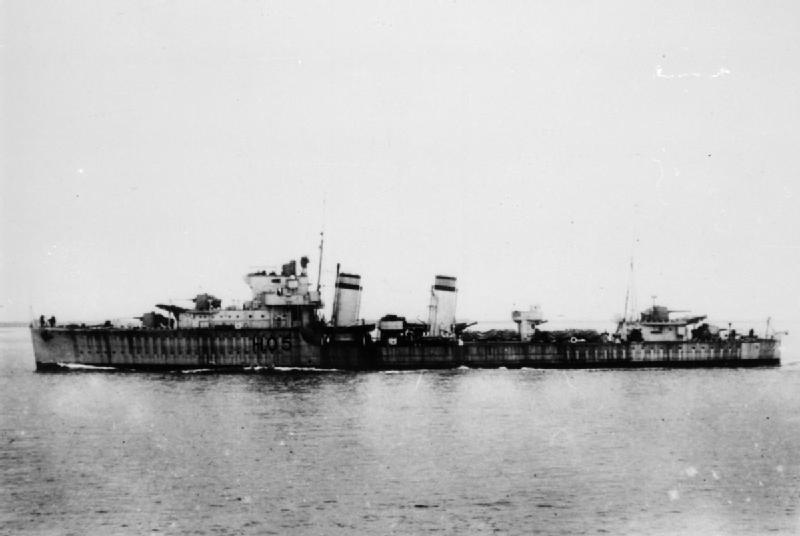
- Greyhound during World War II

History

United Kingdom
- Name: Greyhound
- Ordered: 5 March 1934
- Builder: Vickers Armstrong, Barrow-in-Furness
- Laid down: 20 September 1934
- Launched: 15 August 1935
- Completed: 1 February 1936
- Identification: Pennant number: H05
- Fate: Sunk 22 May 1941

General characteristics as built
- Class & type: G-class destroyer
- Displacement: 1,350 long tons (1,370 t) (standard); 1,883 long tons (1,913 t) (deep load)
- Length: 323 ft (98.5 m)
- Beam: 33 ft (10.1 m)
- Draught: 12 ft 5 in (3.8 m)
- Installed power: 3 Admiralty 3-drum boilers; 34,000 shp (25,000 kW)
- Propulsion: 2 shafts, 2 geared steam turbines
- Speed: 36 knots (67 km/h; 41 mph)
- Range: 5,530 nmi (10,240 km; 6,360 mi) at 15 knots (28 km/h; 17 mph)
- Complement: 137 (peacetime), 146 (wartime)
- Armament: 4 × single 4.7 in (120 mm) guns; 2 × quadruple 0.5 in (12.7 mm) machine guns; 2 × quadruple 21 in (533 mm) torpedo tubes; 20 × depth charges, 1 rail and 2 throwers
- Notes: Pennant number H05

HMS Greyhound was a G-class destroyer built for the Royal Navy in the 1930s. Greyhound participated in the Norwegian Campaign in April 1940, the Dunkirk evacuation in May and the Battle of Dakar in September before being transferred to the Mediterranean Fleet in November. The ship generally escorted the larger ships of the Mediterranean Fleet as they protected convoys against attacks from the Italian Fleet. She sank two Italian submarines while escorting convoys herself in early 1941. Greyhound was sunk by German Junkers Ju 87 Stuka dive bombers north-west of Crete on 22 May 1941 as she escorted the battleships of the Mediterranean Fleet attempting to intercept the German sea-borne invasion forces destined for Crete.

== Description ==
Greyhound displaced 1,350 long tons (1,370 t) at standard load and 1,883 long tons (1,913 t) at deep load. The ship had an overall length of 323 feet (98.5 m), a beam of 33 feet (10.1 m) and a draught of 12 feet 5 inches (3.8 m). She was powered by Parsons geared steam turbines, driving two shafts, which developed a total of 34,000 shaft horsepower (25,000 kW) and gave a maximum speed of 36 knots (67 km/h; 41 mph). Steam for the turbines was provided by three Admiralty 3-drum water-tube boilers. Greyhound carried a maximum of 470 long tons (480 t) of fuel oil that gave her a range of 5,530 nautical miles (10,240 km; 6,360 mi) at 15 knots (28 km/h; 17 mph). The ship's complement was 137 officers and men in peacetime, but increased to 146 in wartime.

The ship mounted four 4.7-inch (120 mm) Mark IX guns in single mounts. For anti-aircraft defence Greyhound had two quadruple Mark I mounts for the 0.5 inch Vickers Mark III machine gun. She was fitted with two above-water quadruple torpedo tube mounts for 21-inch (533 mm) torpedoes. One depth charge rail and two throwers were fitted; 20 depth charges were originally carried, but this increased to 35 shortly after the war began.

== Service ==
Greyhound was laid down by Vickers Armstrong Naval Construction Works at Barrow-in-Furness on 20 September 1934, launched on 15 August 1935 and completed on 31 January 1936. Excluding government-furnished equipment like the armament, the ship cost £248,768. (Note: Adjusted for inflation to 2026 pounds, £15,393,437.) Aside from a brief period when she was assigned to the 20th Destroyer Flotilla after her commissioning, Greyhound spent the prewar period assigned to the 1st Destroyer Flotilla with the Mediterranean Fleet. On 17 November 1937, Greyhound and sister ships Grenade and Glowworm were ordered from their anchorage at Mudros to search for the British steamship African Mariner, which was suspected of smuggling war material to Spain. After African Mariner was located by an aircraft launched from the battlecruiser Repulse, Greyhound intercepted the merchant ship and put a boarding party onboard African Mariner, and took the steamship into Malta. After a ten day search, African Mariner was allowed to continue her journey from Odessa and Novorossisk to Barcelona. She was refitted at Portsmouth Dockyard between 7 June and 23 July 1938 and escorted the ocean liner RMS Strathnaver between Malta and Alexandria during the Munich Crisis in September 1938. She then escorted the light cruiser Arethusa on her voyage to Aden. On 25 January 1939, Greyhound evacuated employees of the British Embassy and their families from Republican-held Barcelona, as the city was threatened with imminent capture by Nationalist forces during the closing stages of the Spanish Civil War. The destroyer was narrowly missed by bombs during the evacuation. The city would fall the next day.

Greyhound and her entire flotilla were transferred to the Western Approaches Command at Plymouth in October. On 12 November 1939 she collided with her sister ship, Gipsy en route to Harwich, and her new assignment with the 22nd Destroyer Flotilla, but she was only slightly damaged, and her repairs were completed two days later. The ship rescued survivors on 18 November from the passenger-cargo liner Simon Bolivar, which had been sunk by two magnetic mines in the North Sea, and from Torchbearer the following day. Greyhound began escorting coastal convoys on 5 December when she was transferred back to the 1st Destroyer Flotilla. On 14 January she captured the German blockade runner Phaedra in the North Sea. The ship was refitted between 16 February and 18 March 1940 and later reassigned to the Home Fleet.

On 5 April Greyhound escorted the battlecruiser Renown as she covered the minelayers preparing to implement Operation Wilfred, an operation to lay mines in the Vestfjord to prevent the transport of Swedish iron ore from Narvik to Germany. The ship was present during, but played no part in, Renown's brief engagement with the German battleships Scharnhorst and Gneisenau on 9 April. Greyhound remained in the Vestfjord when the five ships of the 2nd Destroyer Flotilla sailed into the Ofotfjord on 10 April to engage the German ships that had transported the invasion force to Narvik. She covered the withdrawal of the three surviving destroyers later that day. The ship was damaged by German bombers at Scapa Flow on 18 April and was repaired at Gravesend, Kent, between 22 April and 19 May.

During the Siege of Calais, Greyhound and her sister Grafton provided naval gunfire support for the 30th Motor Brigade on 25 and 26 May. On 28 and 29 May she evacuated 1,360 men from Dunkirk before she was damaged by German bombers. The ship was towed out of the harbour by the Polish destroyer ORP Błyskawica. After her repairs were completed at Chatham Dockyard on 17 June, Greyhound rejoined her flotilla at Dover. On 30 July the ship, and her sister Gallant, escorted the aircraft carrier Argus to Gibraltar and Greyhound was assigned to the 13th Destroyer Flotilla based there. The ship participated in Operations Hats at the end of August when the British reinforced the Mediterranean Fleet.

During the Battle of Dakar on 23 September, Greyhound, the destroyer Fury, and the Australian heavy cruiser HMAS Australia engaged the Vichy French destroyer L'Audacieux which was set on fire and forced to beach itself. The ship escorted the battleship Barham and the cruisers Berwick and Glasgow during Operation Coat in early November as they joined the Mediterranean Fleet. Greyhound herself was transferred to the 14th Destroyer Flotilla in Alexandria. She participated in the inconclusive Battle of Cape Spartivento on 27 November during Operation Collar.

Greyhound participated in Operation Excess in January 1941 and then sank the Italian submarine Neghelli on 19 January while escorting a convoy to Piraeus. In late January, the ship, and the destroyers Juno, Jervis, and Janus, escorted the badly damaged aircraft carrier Illustrious from Malta to Alexandria. Greyhound sank the Italian submarine Anfitrite on 6 March as she attempted to attack Convoy GA.8 which was carrying British troops to Greece. The ship escorted the capital ships of the Mediterranean Fleet during the Battle of Cape Matapan on 28/29 March and initiated the night action when her searchlight illuminated an Italian cruiser. Greyhound and her sister, Griffin, attacked some of the Italian destroyers, but lost them when they passed through their own smokescreen. She sank the Italian sailing ship Romagna on 17 April off Apollonia, Cyrenaica as she was conducting an anti-shipping sweep off the North African coast with the Australian destroyer HMAS Vendetta. The ship escorted the heavy units of the Mediterranean Fleet on 6 May as they provided cover for Operation Tiger, a convoy carrying reinforcements to Egypt. During the invasion of Crete, Greyhound escorted the battleship Warspite west of Crete on 22 May as she covered the cruiser forces attempting to sink the German invasion convoys. The ships were en route to rendezvous with the cruisers in the Kythira Strait when she was struck by three bombs dropped by Stukas of StG 2 and sank a few minutes afterwards. Her survivors were rescued by the destroyers Kingston and Kandahar, but six officers and 74 sailors were killed in the attack. The Germans later rescued four more sailors.
