= HMS Gipsy (H63) =

G-class destroyer of the Royal Navy

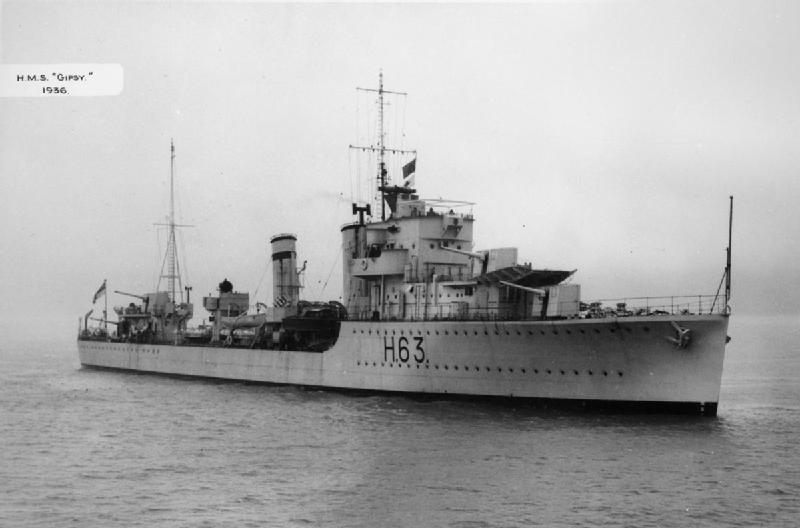
- Gipsy in June 1936

History

United Kingdom
- Name: Gipsy
- Ordered: 5 March 1934
- Builder: Fairfield Shipbuilding and Engineering Company, Govan
- Laid down: 5 September 1934
- Launched: 7 November 1935
- Completed: 22 February 1936
- Identification: Pennant number: H63
- Motto: Trust your luck
- Honours and awards: Atlantic 1939
- Fate: Mined, 21 November 1939
- Badge: On a Field Green a female gipsy's head Proper

General characteristics (as built)
- Class & type: G-class destroyer
- Displacement: 1,350 long tons (1,370 t) (standard); 1,883 long tons (1,913 t) (deep load)
- Length: 323 ft (98.5 m)
- Beam: 33 ft (10.1 m)
- Draught: 12 ft 5 in (3.8 m)
- Installed power: 3 Admiralty 3-drum boilers; 34,000 shp (25,000 kW)
- Propulsion: 2 shafts, 2 geared steam turbines
- Speed: 36 knots (67 km/h; 41 mph)
- Range: 5,530 nmi (10,240 km; 6,360 mi) at 15 knots (28 km/h; 17 mph)
- Complement: 137 (peacetime), 146 (wartime)
- Armament: 4 × single 4.7 in (120 mm) guns; 2 × quadruple 0.5 in (12.7 mm) machine guns; 2 × quadruple 21 in (533 mm) torpedo tubes; 20 × depth charges, 1 rail and 2 throwers

HMS Gipsy was a G-class destroyer built for the Royal Navy during the 1930s. She spent most of the pre-war period as part of the Mediterranean Fleet. The ship was transferred to the British Isles to escort shipping in local waters shortly after the beginning of World War II. Less than a month after her arrival she struck a mine outside Harwich and sank with the loss of 30 of her crew. Her wreck was salvaged and slowly scrapped over the course of the war.

== Description ==
Gipsy displaced 1,350 long tons (1,370 t) at standard load and 1,883 long tons (1,913 t) at deep load. The ship had an overall length of 323 feet (98.5 m), a beam of 33 feet (10.1 m) and a draught of 12 feet 5 inches (3.8 m). She was powered by Parsons geared steam turbines, driving two shafts, which developed a total of 34,000 shaft horsepower (25,000 kW) and gave a maximum speed of 36 knots (67 km/h; 41 mph). Steam for the turbines was provided by three Admiralty 3-drum water-tube boilers. Gipsy carried a maximum of 470 long tons (480 t) of fuel oil that gave her a range of 5,530 nautical miles (10,240 km; 6,360 mi) at 15 knots (28 km/h; 17 mph). The ship's complement was 137 officers and men in peacetime.

The ship mounted four 45-calibre 4.7-inch (120 mm) Mark IX guns in single mounts. For anti-aircraft defence Gipsy had two quadruple Mark I mounts for the 0.5 inch Vickers Mark III machine gun. She was fitted with two above-water quadruple torpedo tube mounts for 21-inch (533 mm) torpedoes. One rail and two depth charge throwers were fitted; 20 depth charges were originally carried, but this increased to 35 shortly after the war began.

== Construction and career ==
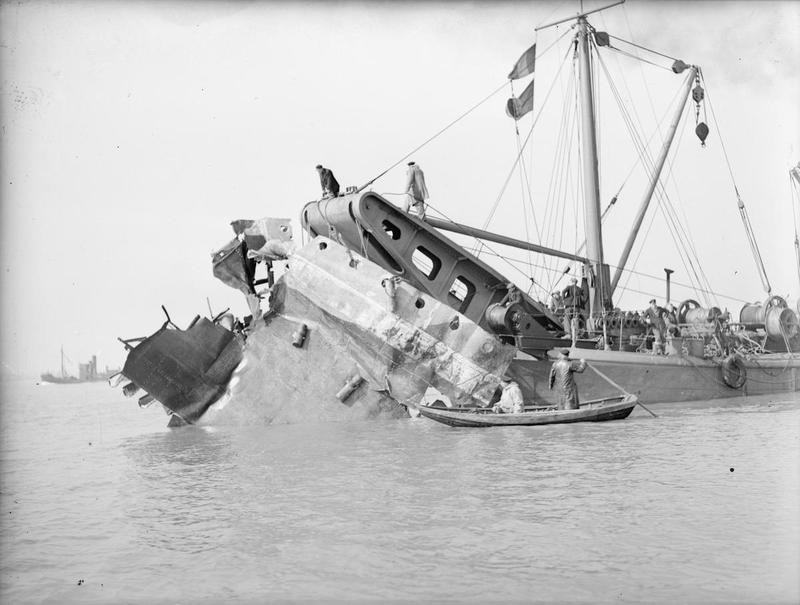
A piece of Gipsy is hauled to the surface by a salvage vessel, March 1943

Gipsy was laid down by the Fairfield Shipbuilding and Engineering Company, at Govan, Scotland, on 4 September 1934, launched on 7 November 1935 and completed on 22 February 1936. Excluding government-furnished equipment like the armament, the ship cost £250,364. Aside from a brief period assigned to the 20th Destroyer Flotilla of the Home Fleet after her commissioning, Gipsy spent the pre-war period assigned to the 1st Destroyer Flotilla with the Mediterranean Fleet.

On the outbreak of the Spanish Civil War in July 1936, the ships of the Mediterranean Fleet were used to evacuate British subjects, and later and other foreign nationals from Spanish Mediterranean ports, while the Home fleet operated off the northern coast of Spain. Gipsy was deployed to the Barcelona area to assist in the evacuation. In total, the Royal Navy evacuated about 6000 refugees (of which about 2000 were British) from Spanish ports in July–August 1936. On 13 February 1937, Gipsy and the destroyer Havock were on passage between Gibraltar and Malta when they were attacked by an aircraft carrying Spanish Nationalist markings. several bombs were dropped by the aircraft, all of which missed the two destroyers, while the two destroyers opened fire on the aircraft. Neither the destroyers or the aircraft was damaged during the engagement. Gipsy was refitted at Devonport Dockyard between 2 June and 30 July 1938.

On the outbreak of the Second World War in September 1939, Gipsy was deployed with the 1st Destroyer Flotilla for patrols and contraband control in the Eastern Mediterranean, based at Alexandria. Gipsy and her entire flotilla were transferred to the Western Approaches Command at Plymouth in October. On 12 November she collided with her sister ship, Greyhound, en route to Harwich, and her new assignment with the 22nd Destroyer Flotilla, but she was only slightly damaged. The ship rescued three German airmen outside Harwich harbour on 21 November and returned to port to turn them over the army.

Later that evening, Gipsy set out with the destroyers Griffin, Keith, Boadicea, ORP Burza and ORP Grom to hunt for U-Boats thought to be minelaying in the North Sea. Just outside the harbour boom she triggered one of the two magnetic mines dropped about two hours earlier by two German seaplanes, and, almost broken in half, sank on the edge of the deepwater channel at 51°57′N 1°19′E. 31 of her crew, including the captain, Lt-Cdr Crossley, were killed or fatally injured, 115 were rescued by the other destroyers and by harbour launches. The inquiry determined that, though the harbour defences had been on alert (UK National Archive 248 Heavy AA Battery War Diary WO 166/2529), and had actually seen and plotted both the seaplanes and their mines, their reporting had been inaccurate. Though the Harwich admiral had told the destroyers to hug the side of the channel opposite to where the mines fell, he had not stipulated why, nor that the ships were in any particular danger. Apart from those on the bridge, Gipsy's crew were unaware of any danger at all as a result some had gone to sleep below decks, and no contingency plan had been made to ready lifeboats. (sources—Admiralty Board of Inquiry Minutes and Report—UK National Archive ADM 1/22793, logs of Keith and Boadicea ADM 53/109431 and 107799; correspondence with Captain R D Franks, Gipsy's 1st Lieutenant, and his article in "Highlight" Harwich Society magazine).

There was controversy at the time, and later, about this lack of warning, and also about the failure of the local defences to fire on the German seaplanes (Nore Command War Diary ADM 199/375; 6 Anti-Aircraft Division War Diary WO 166/2168l Captain R D Franks; Highlight). It turned out that their failure to fire had been due to an Army Anti-Aircraft Command order that unidentified aircraft should not be engaged, though the defenders had, at the time, recognised their nationality, if not their type—and seen their mines. (ADM 1/22793, 515 Coast Artillery Regiment War Diary WO 166/1718).

The wreck remained upright on the seabed with only the bridge and forward gun visible at high tide. Only buckled plating amidships held the two main sections of the wreck together and they were cut by explosives when salvage began shortly after her sinking. The two halves were raised by pontoons, and were subsequently broken up separately. 750 long tons (760 t) of ferrous scrap and 38 long tons (39 t) of non-ferrous metals were recovered between June 1940 and February 1944.
