= Victor Oehrn =

German military officer (1907–1997)

- Born: 21 October 1907; Gədəbəy, Azerbaijan
- Died: 26 December 1997 (aged 90); Bonn
- Burial place: Cemetery Rüngsdorf. Section II–Grave 226
- Military career
- Allegiance: Weimar Republic (to 1933); Nazi Germany
- Branch: Reichsmarine; Kriegsmarine
- Service years: 1927–45
- Rank: Fregattenkapitän
- Commands: U-14; U-37
- Conflicts: World War II: Battle of the Atlantic
- Awards: Knight's Cross of the Iron Cross

Victor Otto Oehrn (21 October 1907 – 26 December 1997) was a Fregattenkapitän with the Kriegsmarine during World War II. He commanded the U-boats U-14 and U-37, sinking twenty-four ships on four patrols, for a total of 104,846 tons of Allied shipping.

== Career ==
Oehrn joined the Reichsmarine in 1927, serving aboard the light cruisers Königsberg and Karlsruhe, before being one of the first officers to transfer to the newly formed U-boat arm in July 1935. He was appointed to command of U-14 in January 1936, and patrolled in Spanish waters during the Civil War in July–September 1936. In August 1939 he joined the staff of BdU as an Admiralstabsoffizier.

In May 1940 Oehrn took command of U-37, in order to restore trust in the G7e/T2 torpedo, which had performed abysmally, often detonating prematurely or not at all. In four patrols he sank 23 merchant ships for a total of 103,821 GRT, damaged another of 9,494 GRT, and sank the British sloop HMS Penzance, before returning to the staff in August.

From November 1941 Oehrn served on the Mediterranean U-boat staff, but during a mission to North Africa in July 1942, he was severely wounded and captured. After recovering at a British Military Hospital in Alexandria, Oehrn was sent to POW Camp 306 on the Suez Canal. He returned to Germany in October 1943 after being released in a prisoner exchange. Oehrn spent the remainder of the war serving on the staff in a number of posts.

He died in December 1997.

== Awards ==
- Sudetenland Medal (20 December 1939)
- Iron Cross (1939)
  - 2nd Class (27 January 1940)
  - 1st Class (10 June 1940)
- Italian Croce al Merito di Guerra with Swords (2 November 1941)
- Italian Croce di guerra al valore militare (28 January 1942)
- Knight's Cross of the Iron Cross on 21 October 1940 as Kapitänleutnant and commander of U-37
