= Hartmann's wolfpack =

WWII German submarine formation

Hartmann’s wolfpack was a formation of Nazi Germany's Kriegsmarine in World War II, a "wolfpack" of U-boats that operated during the early stages of the Battle of the Atlantic.

== Background ==
Hartmann’s wolfpack was the first essay by the Kriegsmarine during the Second World War in its wolfpack tactic against allied convoys. Its operations were in October 1939, during the earliest stage of the Atlantic campaign. The name "Hartmann" was unofficial, taken from that of its commander, Werner Hartmann. Unlike later packs which had specific code names this formation was left without an official designation. The original intent of the U-boat Command (BdU) was to organize two packs of five boats each; one composed of Type VIIB’s from 7th ("Wegener") flotilla and the other of the larger Type IX’s of 6th ("Hundius") flotilla. In the event, several boats were unavailable, so the operation was adjusted to form a single pack comprised six boats. This arrangement meant forming a unit of different type of vessel, who had not previously operated together. The whole force was commanded by Hartmann, flotilla commander of the Hundius flotilla.

== Operations ==
The first five boats sailed independently in October 1939 from bases in NW Germany, sailing northabout around the coast of Scotland in order to reach the Western Approaches. The last boat, U-40, which was delayed in departing, was ordered to take the southabout route through the Channel; this was more dangerous, but was deemed practicable. In the event U–40 became trapped by the Allies' Channel defences, the Dover Barrage; on 13 October she struck a mine and was destroyed.

The remaining five boats under Hartmann’s command took station in the Western Approaches. The German signals intelligence branch, B-Dienst, which had penetrated British naval codes, was able to give notice of a convoy (KJF 3) from the Caribbean and BdU instructed the pack to intercept. Three boats found the convoy and attacked, while a fourth failed to make contact. The fifth, U-42, met a freighter sailing independently; she attacked, but was counter-attacked by two destroyers that came to the scene and was destroyed. The attack on KJF 3 was an ad hoc affair (Blair describes it as "an uncoordinated free for all"); though four ships were sunk, one of the attacking boats, U-45 was destroyed by the convoy escorts.

A second convoy, HG 3 from Gibraltar, was detected by B-dienst and Hartmann’s boats were again ordered to intercept. U-46 made contact and shadowed while the other two closed. The attack sank three ships without loss to the attackers.

Following this the boats were relieved, and returned home.

== Aftermath ==
This first attempt at operating a wolf pack was, over all, not a success. In the course of the operation Hartmann's skippers had sunk seven ships from two convoys and another four ships sailing alone (stragglers and independent sailings). However three of the six U-boats had been destroyed, some 10% of the available Type VII (sea-going) and Type IX (ocean-going) vessels the U-boat Arm had.

The original pack tactic envisaged that command and co-ordination would be exercised at sea; however while this had worked on exercise in the Baltic and North Seas it was unworkable in the wider reaches of the Atlantic. Hartman reported it was impossible to maintain an overview of the situation from his U-boat in the midst of the ocean and equally impossible to maintain contact with his charges. The experience was also soured by the continuing torpedo problems that the U-boat Arm suffered during the first years of the conflict.

Following this, wolfpack tactics were shelved until the following year, when they were tried again with more success during the so-called "Happy Time".

== U-boats involved ==
- German submarine U-37
- German submarine U-40
- German submarine U-42
- German submarine U-45
- German submarine U-46
- German submarine U-48

== See also ==
- Rösing's wolfpack
