= Rösing's wolfpack =

WWII German submarine formation

Rösing's wolfpack was a formation of Nazi Germany's Kriegsmarine in World War II, a "wolfpack" of U-boats that operated during the early stages of the Battle of the Atlantic.

== Background ==
Rösing's wolfpack was an early attempt by the Kriegsmarine during World War II in its wolfpack tactic against Allied convoys. Its operations were in June 1940, at the beginning of the "Happy Time", when the U-boat Arm renewed its offensive in the Atlantic campaign. The name "Rösing" was unofficial, taken from that of its commander, Hans-Rudolf Rösing. Unlike later packs which had specific code names this formation was left without an official designation.

In June 1940 U-boat Command (BdU) received intelligence that a large troop convoy would be passing through the mid-Atlantic to Britain. The convoy, designated US 3, would comprise seven troopships, including RMS Queen Mary and would be transporting some 25,000 Australian and New Zealand troops. It was decided to form a patrol line off the coast of Spain, in order to mount a wolf pack attack on the convoy. To this end three U-boats already on station, and two others sent as reinforcement, would concentrate of Cape Finisterre in Spain. The group would be under the command of K.Kapt. Rösing, 7th ("Wegener's") flotilla commander.

== Operations ==
The two boats dispatched from Germany were U-46, under Endrass, and U-48 under Rösing. They would join U-29 (Schuhart), U-43 (Ambrosius) and U-101 (Frauenheim), which were already in mid-Atlantic.

All five boats met with success while moving into position. U-46 was able to intercept and sink three ships, sailing alone and unescorted; she also sank the AMC RMS Carinthia. U 48 sank three ships in transit, while in the south U-101 also sank three ships.

By 14 June all five boats were in position, but the Allies, suspecting U-boat activity in the area, re-routed the convoy to the west, so that it passed around the packs position. By 17 June it was clear the convoy had escaped, and the pack was dissolved. All boats then proceeded to patrol independently.

Before returning to base U-46 sank one more ship and attacked HMS Ark Royal, though this was unsuccessful. U-48 sank four more ships, for a total of seven (37,425 GRT), U-101 sank three more, including the passenger ship Wellington Star, for a total of seven (42,026 GRT). All U-boats returned to base safely.

== Aftermath ==
Sailing independently, the five boats of Rösing's pack achieved great success, sinking a total of 27 ships. However, as a wolfpack, operating as a group to intercept and destroy a convoy of ships, it failed in its intent. The failure underlined the difficulties of operating a wolf pack under local control at sea; henceforth BdU determined to exercise close control from its headquarters, newly established at Lorient in occupied France

== U-boats involved ==
- U-29
- U-43
- U-46
- U-48
- U-101

== See also ==
- Hartmann's wolfpack
