= German submarine U-43 (1939) =

German world war II submarine

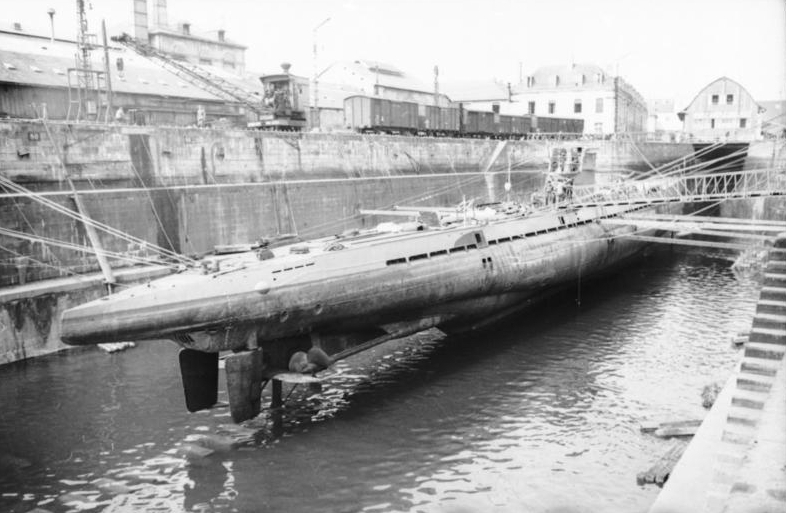
- U-37, (an identical U-boat to U-43) at Lorient in 1940

History

Nazi Germany
- Name: U-43
- Ordered: 21 November 1936
- Builder: AG Weser, Bremen
- Yard number: 948
- Laid down: 15 August 1938
- Launched: 23 May 1939
- Commissioned: 26 August 1939
- Fate: Sunk south-west of the Azores by an American aircraft, 30 July 1943. 55 dead

General characteristics
- Class & type: Type IXA submarine
- Displacement: 1,032 t (1,016 long tons) surfaced; 1,153 t (1,135 long tons) submerged
- Length: 76.50 m (251 ft) o/a; 58.75 m (192 ft 9 in) pressure hull
- Beam: 6.51 m (21 ft 4 in) o/a; 4.40 m (14 ft 5 in) pressure hull
- Height: 9.60 m (31 ft 6 in)
- Draught: 4.70 m (15 ft 5 in)
- Installed power: 4,400 PS (3,200 kW; 4,300 bhp) (diesels); 1,000 PS (740 kW; 990 shp) (electric)
- Propulsion: 2 shafts; 2 × diesel engines; 2 × electric motors
- Speed: 18.2 knots (33.7 km/h; 20.9 mph) surfaced; 7.7 knots (14.3 km/h; 8.9 mph) submerged
- Range: 10,500 nmi (19,400 km; 12,100 mi) at 10 knots (19 km/h; 12 mph) surfaced; 65–78 nmi (120–144 km; 75–90 mi) at 4 knots (7.4 km/h; 4.6 mph) submerged
- Test depth: 230 m (750 ft)
- Complement: 4 officers, 44 enlisted
- Armament: 6 × torpedo tubes (4 bow, 2 stern); 22 × 53.3 cm (21 in) torpedoes; 1 × 10.5 cm (4.1 in) SK C/32 deck gun (180 rounds); 1 × 3.7 cm (1.5 in) SK C/30 AA gun; 1 × twin 2 cm FlaK 30 AA guns

Service record
- Part of: 6th U-boat Flotilla; 26 August – 31 December 1939; 2nd U-boat Flotilla; 1 January 1940 – 30 July 1943
- Identification codes: M 24 266
- Commanders: Kptlt. Wilhelm Ambrosius; 26 August 1939 – 20 October 1940; Kptlt. Wolfgang Lüth; 21 October 1940 – 11 April 1942; Oblt.z.S. Hans-Joachim Schwantke; 19 March 1942 – 30 July 1943
- Operations: 14 patrols: 1st patrol: 6 November – 14 December 1939; 2nd patrol: 13 March – 6 April 1940; 3rd patrol: 12 – 23 April 1940; 4th patrol: a. 13 May – 22 July 1940; b. 9 – 12 September 1940; 5th patrol: 15 September – 18 October 1940; 6th patrol: 10 November – 17 December 1940; 7th patrol: 11 May – 1 July 1941; 8th patrol: 2 August – 23 September 1941; 9th patrol: 10 November – 16 December 1941; 10th patrol: 30 December 1941 – 22 January 1942; 11th patrol: 4 July – 15 August 1942; 12th patrol: 23 September – 9 December 1942; 13th patrol: 9 January – 31 March 1943; 14th patrol: 13 – 30 July 1943
- Victories: 21 merchant ships sunk (117,036 GRT); 1 merchant ship total loss (9,131 GRT); 1 merchant ship damaged (10,350 GRT)

German submarine U-43 was a Type IXA U-boat of Nazi Germany's Kriegsmarine during World War II. The keel for U-43 was laid down in August 1938 at Bremen; she was launched in May 1939 and commissioned in August.

Between November 1939 and July 1943, the U-boat conducted 14 combat patrols, sinking 21 merchant ships for a total of 117,036 gross register tons (GRT), damaging one ship of 10,350 GRT and another of 9,131 GRT — enough for it to be declared a total loss.

U-43 was sunk on 30 July 1943 southwest of the Azores by a torpedo dropped by a United States Navy aircraft; all 55 hands were lost.

== Design ==
As one of the eight original German Type IX submarines, later designated IXA, U-43 had a displacement of 1,032 tonnes (1,016 long tons) when at the surface and 1,153 tonnes (1,135 long tons) while submerged. The U-boat had a total length of 76.50 m (251 ft), a pressure hull length of 58.75 m (192 ft 9 in), a beam of 6.51 m (21 ft 4 in), a height of 9.40 m (30 ft 10 in), and a draught of 4.70 m (15 ft 5 in). The submarine was powered by two MAN M 9 V 40/46 supercharged four-stroke, nine-cylinder diesel engines producing a total of 4,400 metric horsepower (3,240 kW; 4,340 shp) for use while surfaced, two Siemens-Schuckert 2 GU 345/34 double-acting electric motors producing a total of 1,000 metric horsepower (740 kW; 990 shp) for use while submerged. She had two shafts and two 1.92 m (6 ft) propellers. The boat was capable of operating at depths of up to 230 metres (750 ft).

The submarine had a maximum surface speed of 18.2 knots (33.7 km/h; 20.9 mph) and a maximum submerged speed of 7.7 knots (14.3 km/h; 8.9 mph). When submerged, the boat could operate for 65–78 nautical miles (120–144 km; 75–90 mi) at 4 knots (7.4 km/h; 4.6 mph); when surfaced, she could travel 10,500 nautical miles (19,400 km; 12,100 mi) at 10 knots (19 km/h; 12 mph). U-43 was fitted with six 53.3 cm (21 in) torpedo tubes (four fitted at the bow and two at the stern), 22 torpedoes, one 10.5 cm (4.13 in) SK C/32 naval gun, 180 rounds, and a 3.7 cm (1.5 in) SK C/30 as well as a 2 cm (0.79 in) C/30 anti-aircraft gun. The boat had a complement of forty-eight.

== Service history ==
U-43 was ordered for the Kriegsmarine on 21 November 1936 (as part of Plan Z and in violation of the Treaty of Versailles). Her keel was laid down on 15 August 1938 by AG Weser, Bremen as yard number 946. She was launched on 23 May 1939 and commissioned on 26 August of that same year under the command of Korvettenkapitän Wilhelm Ambrosius.

=== 1st patrol ===
Commissioned into the 6th U-boat Flotilla, based at Kiel, U-43 left for her first combat patrol of the war on 6 November 1939, sailing around the British Isles and into the Atlantic. There, on 16 November, she attacked the 4,915 GRT British merchant ship Arlington Court, a straggler from Convoy SL-7A, en route from Rosario, Argentina to Hull with a cargo of 7,340 tons of maize. The ship was hit by a single torpedo 320 nautical miles (590 km; 370 mi) west-south-west of Start Point in Devon. The crew abandoned ship, the U-boat fired another torpedo, which sank the ship within 30 minutes. Seven of the crew were lost, the survivors were picked up by Dutch and Norwegian freighters. After the attack, U-43 was hunted by convoy escorts for 20 hours, sustaining some damage from depth charges.

Continuing with her patrol, U-43 attacked Convoy 14-BS in the Bay of Biscay, and sank the 4,374 GRT French merchant ship Arijon on 22 November. Convoy escorts counter-attacked with 23 depth charges, but U-43 escaped without damage.

Late on 25 November 1939, about 120 nautical miles (220 km; 140 mi) west-north-west of Cape Finisterre (northwest Spain), U-43 attacked the unescorted 2,483 GRT British collier Uskmouth. Both G7a torpedoes malfunctioned (a common problem in the early years of the war), so the U-boat opened fire with her deck gun. After a while she fired another torpedo, but missed, so recommenced shelling. After firing 149 rounds, U-43 left the ship on fire and slowly sinking. Two crewmen were killed, while 23 survivors were picked up by an Italian merchant ship.

On the morning of 8 December U-43 was attacked by an unidentified aircraft and severely damaged. She returned to Wilhelmshaven six days later, on the 14th.

=== 2nd patrol ===
After the 6th U-boat Flotilla was disbanded in December 1939, U-43 was assigned to the 2nd U-boat Flotilla based in Wilhelmshaven. U-43 departed from there on 13 March 1940 and sailed along the coast of Norway, north of Scotland, and into the waters west of Ireland, but had no success. The First Watch Officer (second-in-command of the U-boat) Oberleutnant zur See Hans-Wilhelm Behrens fell overboard and was lost on 31 March. U-43 returned to Wilhelmshaven, after 25 days at sea, on 6 April.

=== 3rd patrol ===
U-43's third voyage began on 12 April 1940. She patrolled the North Sea and along the Norwegian coast, supporting the invasion of that country. On 22 April she was bombed by two British Hudson aircraft and suffered slight damage. She returned to Wilhelmshaven the next day.

=== 4th patrol ===
U-43 sailed from Wilhelmshaven on 13 May 1940 and out into the Atlantic. Her first attack took place on 28 May, south-west of Land's End, when she fired a torpedo at the British merchant ship Alca. She missed, and then opened fire with her deck gun. The armed ship returned fire, but neither vessel made any hits; the U-boat broke off the attack.

U-43 finally found success on 21 June when she attacked Convoy 65-X south-west of Figueira da Foz, Portugal, hitting the 8,627 GRT British tanker Yarraville with a single torpedo. The ship caught fire and sank. Five crew members were killed, the 45 survivors were picked up by a French trawler.

Late on 30 June U-43 hit the 13,376 GRT British merchant ship SS Avelona Star with a single torpedo 220 nautical miles (410 km; 250 mi) northwest of Cape Finisterre. The ship, part of Convoy SL-36, was en route from Buenos Aires to London with a cargo of 5,630 tons of frozen meat and 1,000 tons of oranges. The crew abandoned the ship, which foundered the next day. One crewman was killed in the attack, the 84 survivors were picked up by the British merchant ship Beignon, which was subsequently torpedoed and sunk by U-30 on 1 July. Three survivors from Avelona Star were killed.

On the evening of 9 July U-43 sank the unescorted 3,944 GRT British merchant ship Aylesbury about 200 nautical miles (370 km; 230 mi) southeast of Ireland. Hit by two torpedoes, the ship sank in 15 minutes. All 35 crew survived.

U-43's fourth and final success on her fourth patrol took place on the morning of 17 July when she sank the 3,509 GRT British merchant ship Fellside, a straggler from convoy OA-184, about 135 nautical miles (250 km; 155 mi) north-west of Bloody Foreland (Cnoc Fola), County Donegal. The U-boat's first torpedo passed under the vessel, but the second struck the ship and caused her to sink within five minutes. Twelve of the crew were killed, 21 survivors were rescued. U-43 arrived back at Wilhelmshaven on 22 July after 71 days at sea.

=== 5th patrol ===
U-43 sailed from Wilhelmshaven on 9 September 1940, stopping at Bergen, Norway for three days before sailing on the 15th for another Atlantic patrol. She sank only one ship, the 5,802 GRT British merchantman Sulairia, separated from Convoy OB 217, on 25 September. The U-boat hit the ship with a single torpedo causing her to sink 356 nautical miles (659 km; 410 mi) west of Achill Head, County Mayo. One man was lost, the remaining 56 crewmen were picked up by HMCS Ottawa.

U-43 then made for her new home port at Lorient in France, where the 2nd U-boat Flotilla had relocated in June after the fall of that country, arriving there on 18 October. Her commander, Wilhelm Ambrosius, was promoted to Korvettenkapitän on 1 November, and left U-43, going on to take command of the 22nd U-boat Flotilla in January 1941. Command of the U-boat passed to Oberleutnant zur See Wolfgang Lüth.

=== 6th patrol ===
Under her new captain, U-43 left Lorient on 10 November 1940 and returned to the waters west of Ireland, where she sank three more merchant ships and damaged a fourth.

On the morning of 2 December she attacked Convoy OB 251 west-south-west of Rockall and sank two ships. Her first victim was the 7,113 GRT British merchant ship Pacific President, which was hit by two torpedoes and quickly sank with the loss of her crew of 50 men. Forty-five minutes later U-43 hit the 12,247 GRT British oil tanker Victor Ross with two torpedoes. A third torpedo was fired five minutes later, but missed, the U-boat evaded a ramming attempt by crash-diving shortly afterwards. However, she persisted and hit the ship with a fourth torpedo 20 minutes later, sinking her. There were no survivors from her 44 crew.

In the evening of 6 December, U-43 spotted a ship and pursued her for three and a half hours before firing a single torpedo, which missed. The U-boat fired another torpedo 20 minutes later, hitting the unknown ship and sinking her in 63 seconds. The vessel is believed to be the 1,902 GRT Norwegian merchant ship Skrim, which had lost contact with Convoy OB 252 two days before in heavy weather and was never seen again.

Finally, on 13 December, U-43 fired two torpedoes at the unescorted 10,350 GRT British merchant ship Orari about 450 nautical miles (830 km; 520 mi) southwest of Ireland. One torpedo hit the ship in the stern. However, U-43 had no torpedoes left, and the sea was too rough for her to use her deck gun. The crew of the ship managed to plug the hole with tarpaulins, and the ship made it under her own power to the Clyde.

U-43 returned to Lorient on 17 December 1940 after a patrol of 38 days. On 4 February 1941, while at Lorient docks, U-43 was sunk after a valve was accidentally left open, putting the U-boat out of action for the next three months.

=== 7th patrol ===
After this enforced absence U-43 began her next patrol on 11 May 1941, still under the command of Wolfgang Lüth, who had been promoted to Kapitänleutnant on 1 January. Once again she sailed out into the mid-Atlantic, where she sank three ships.

Early on the morning of 15 May U-43 opened fire with her deck gun and anti-aircraft guns on the 488 GRT French three-masted sailing ship Notre Dame du Châtelet, en route from St. Malo to the Grand Banks of Newfoundland to fish. After being hit by 45 shells the ship sank. Lüth suspected that the vessel was reporting the positions of U-boats to Allied forces, while the 10 survivors thought they had been attacked by a British submarine. They, from her crew of 38, abandoned ship in two lifeboats. Two were picked up by the Italian submarine Otaria on 23 May.

On the evening of 6 June U-43 put two torpedoes into the 4,802 GRT Dutch merchant ship Yselhaven about 600 nautical miles (1,100 km; 690 mi) east of Newfoundland. The ship, separated from Convoy OB 328, sank within two minutes. Only 10 of her crew of 34 survived to be rescued by the Finnish merchantman Hammarland on 15 June.

In the early hours of 17 June, U-43 torpedoed and sank the 2,727 GRT British merchant ship Cathrine, part of Convoy SL-76, which was loaded with 3,700 tons of manganese ore, about 250 nautical miles (460 km; 290 mi) south-west of Cape Clear (southern Ireland). Only three men survived from her crew of 27; they spent 33 days in a lifeboat before being found by a British trawler.

U-43 returned to Lorient on 1 July after a patrol lasting 52 days.

=== 8th and 9th patrols ===
U-43's next patrol, beginning on 2 August 1941, took her back out into the mid-Atlantic for 53 days, but she had no success before returning to Lorient on 23 September.

U-43 went to sea again on 10 November 1941, this time she was more successful, sinking three ships near the Azores.

Early on the morning of 29 November, U-43 fired two torpedoes at the 5,569 GRT British merchant ship Thornliebank, part of Convoy OS-12, and loaded with general cargo and munitions, about 240 nautical miles (440 km; 280 mi) north-north-west of the Azores. Both torpedoes struck the ship, which exploded violently. There were no survivors from the crew of 75 men. Despite being about 1,200 metres (0.75 mi) distant, debris from the explosion struck the surfaced U-boat, slightly injuring a crewman; the next day a 10 cm (3.9 in) shell without a fuze, which had been blown from the torpedoed ship was found lodged in the conning tower.

On the evening of 30 November, the 4,868 GRT British merchant ship Ashby, a straggler from Convoy OS-12, was hit by one of two torpedoes fired by U-43, 170 nautical miles (310 km; 200 mi) south-south-east of Flores in the Azores. The ship sank within four minutes with the loss of 17 of her crew of 50. The survivors were picked up by the Portuguese destroyer Lima. After the attack the U-boat was depth charged for several hours by convoy escorts, but managed to escape unharmed.

At about 17:00 on 1 December 1941, U-43 and U-575 spotted the 7,542 GRT unescorted and unarmed tanker Astral. Both U-boats gave chase, but after four hours U-575, commanded by Kapitänleutnant Günther Heydemann, observed the large American flag painted on her side and abandoned the pursuit. U-43 continued to follow the neutral ship, firing a torpedo at her around midnight, which missed. The ship immediately began to sail a zigzag evasive course at full speed, but the U-boat had no problem following her in the light of the full moon. The next morning U-43 hit the Astral with two torpedoes. The ship, loaded with 78,200 barrels (12,430 m^{3}) of gasoline and kerosene, exploded and sank within minutes. There were no survivors from her crew of 37. The Astral was the third of four American merchant ships sunk by U-boats prior to America's entry into the war.

U-43 returned to Lorient on 16 December.

=== 10th patrol ===
Lüth's last patrol with the boat began on 30 December 1941, when U-43 sailed from Lorient into the mid-Atlantic, where she sank three more ships. The first was the 5,246 GRT Swedish cargo ship Yngaren, straggling from convoy HX 168 due to bad weather, about 600 nautical miles (1,100 km; 690 mi) west of Ireland. On the morning of 12 January 1942 the ship was hit by two torpedoes and sank within a minute. Six British passengers and 32 crewmen were lost, the only two survivors were spotted on a raft on 10 February by a British patrol aircraft, which directed a fishing trawler to their position the next day.

Early in the morning of 14 January, U-43 attacked Convoy ON 55 south of Iceland and sank the 6,641 GRT British merchant ship Empire Surf. Only six of the crew of 53 survived to be picked up by HMS Alisma. About two hours later U-43 attacked the convoy again and sank the 5,707 GRT Panama-registered American merchant ship Chepo. There were 21 survivors from her 38 crew.

The U-boat then sailed to Kiel, arriving on 22 January. Command of the U-boat passed to her 1.WO, Oberleutnant zur See Hans-Joachim Schwantke, as Lüth left to commission U-181.

=== 11th patrol ===
U-43's first patrol under her new commander began on 4 July 1942, as she sailed from Kiel via the 'gap' between Iceland and the Faroe Islands into the mid-Atlantic. However, she achieved no success. Attacking Convoy ON 115 off the coast of Newfoundland 3 August, U-43 was caught on the surface by the Canadian corvette HMCS Sackville. As the submarine dove, it was hit by a series of depth charges from Sackville. The submarine lost power and lights but managed to stay afloat and restart its engines, retreating to France for repairs with serious damage to its engines, compressors, compasses, a leaking hatch and a crewman with internal injuries. U-43 arrived back at Lorient on 15 August after 43 days at sea.

=== 12th patrol ===
U-43's next patrol was more successful, departing from Lorient on 23 September 1942, sailing across the Atlantic and into the Gulf of Saint Lawrence.

On the morning of 18 November, U-43 fired four torpedoes at Convoy SC 109 and hit the 9,131 GRT American tanker Brilliant, loaded with 90,704 barrels (14,420.8 m^{3}) of fuel oil. A 40-foot-diameter (12 m) hole was made in her side, and the cargo caught fire. While some of the crew abandoned ship, those remaining aboard managed to put the fires out; making only three knots, the ship limped the 300 nautical miles (560 km; 350 mi) to Bonavista Bay, Newfoundland, arriving on 24 November. Brilliant eventually left Newfoundland on 18 January 1943 under tow, but after two days the ship broke in half. The fore section sank immediately, while the aft section drifted for some days before it was found and the 44 crew rescued. The aft section was taken in tow, but sank the next day. U-43 arrived back at Lorient on 9 December after a patrol of 78 days.

=== 13th patrol ===
U-43's first patrol of 1943 began on 9 January, patrolling the waters between the Azores and the West African coast. On 3 March she spotted a vessel, identified it as a British Blue Star Line merchant ship, and hit it with three torpedoes, it sank it within two minutes. Only later did U-43 learn that it was the 5,154 GRT German blockade runner Doggerbank, formerly the British Speybank, that had been captured by the auxiliary cruiser Atlantis in January 1941. The ship was carrying 7,000 tons of rubber, fats, fish oil, and other raw materials from Yokohama to France; she was several days ahead of her scheduled arrival date.

U-43 returned to Lorient on 31 March after 82 days at sea.

=== 14th patrol ===
U-43's final patrol began when she sailed from Lorient on 13 July 1943 and headed southwest into the Atlantic. On the evening of 19 July, in company with U-403 in the Bay of Biscay, the two U-boats were attacked by a British Liberator Mk.V bomber of No. 86 Squadron RAF. U-403 crash-dived immediately, covered by the AA fire of U-43, which then dived. The Liberator was slightly damaged and a crewman wounded, but dropped two homing torpedoes. Neither U-boat was damaged and both escaped.

==== Sinking ====
On 30 July 1943, U-43 was attacked again, this time by a Grumman TBF Avenger torpedo bomber from the American escort carrier USS Santee. The aircraft dropped a Mark 24 FIDO Torpedo and sank the U-boat southwest of the Azores, in position 34°57′N 35°11′W. All 55 crew members went down with the submarine.

=== Wolfpacks ===
U-43 took part in 10 wolfpacks, namely:

- Rösing (12 – 15 June 1940)
- West (17 May – 16 June 1941)
- Kurfürst (16 – 20 June 1941)
- Grönland (10 – 27 August 1941)
- Markgraf (27 August – 12 September 1941)
- Steuben (14 November – 2 December 1941)
- Wolf (13 – 30 July 1942)
- Pirat (31 July – 3 August 1942)
- Rochen (27 January – 28 February 1943)
- Tümmler (1 – 19 March 1943)

== Summary of raiding history ==
During her service in the Kriegsmarine, U-43 sank 21 merchant ships (one under friendly fire) for a total of 117,036 GRT, damaged one vessel of 10,350 GRT, and another of 9,131 GRT - enough for it to be declared a total loss.

Date	Name of ship	Nationality	Tonnage	Fate and location
16 November 1939	Arlington Court	United Kingdom	4,915	Sunk at 48°14′N 11°42′W
22 November 1939	Arijon	France	4,374	Sunk at 45°40′N 04°50′W
25 November 1939	Uskmouth	United Kingdom	2,483	Sunk at 43°22′N 11°27′W
21 June 1940	Yarraville	United Kingdom	8,627	Sunk at 39°40′N 11°34′W
30 June 1940	Avelona Star	United Kingdom	13,376	Sunk at 46°46′N 12°17′W
9 July 1940	Aylesbury	United Kingdom	3,944	Sunk at 48°39′N 13°33′W
17 July 1940	Fellside	United Kingdom	3,509	Sunk at 56°09′N 12°30′W
25 September 1940	Sulairia	United Kingdom	5,802	Sunk at 53°43′N 20°10′W
2 December 1940	Pacific President	United Kingdom	7,113	Sunk at 56°04′N 18°45′W
2 December 1940	Victor Ross	United Kingdom	12,247	Sunk at 56°04′N 18°30′W
6 December 1940	Skrim	Norway	1,902	Sunk at 53°N 21°W
13 December 1940	Orari	United Kingdom	10,350	Damaged at 49°50′N 20°55′W
15 May 1941	Notre Dame du Châtelet	France	488	Sunk at 48°N 14°W
6 June 1941	Yselhaven	Netherlands	4,802	Sunk at 49°25′N 40°54′W
17 June 1941	Cathrine	United Kingdom	2,727	Sunk at 49°30′N 16°00′W
29 November 1941	Thornliebank	United Kingdom	5,569	Sunk at 41°50′N 29°48′W
30 November 1941	Ashby	United Kingdom	4,868	Sunk at 36°54′N 29°51′W
2 December 1941	Astral	United States	7,542	Sunk at 35°40′N 24°00′W
12 January 1942	Yngaren	Sweden	5,246	Sunk at 57°N 26°W
14 January 1942	Chepo	Panama	5,707	Sunk at 58°30′N 19°40′W
14 January 1942	Empire Surf	United Kingdom	6,641	Sunk at 58°42′N 19°16′W
18 November 1942	Brilliant	United States	9,131	Total loss at 50°45′N 45°53′W
3 March 1943	Doggerbank	Nazi Germany	5,154	Sunk at 29°10′N 34°10′W

== Bibliography ==
- Busch, Rainer; Röll, Hans-Joachim (1999). German U-boat commanders of World War II : a biographical dictionary. Translated by Brooks, Geoffrey. London, Annapolis, Md: Greenhill Books, Naval Institute Press. ISBN 1-55750-186-6.
- Busch, Rainer; Röll, Hans-Joachim (1999). Deutsche U-Boot-Verluste von September 1939 bis Mai 1945 [German U-boat losses from September 1939 to May 1945]. Der U-Boot-Krieg (in German). Vol. IV. Hamburg, Berlin, Bonn: Mittler. ISBN 3-8132-0514-2.
- Cressman, Robert (December 1999). The official chronology of the U.S. Navy in World War II. US Naval Institute Press. ISBN 1-55750-149-1.
- Gröner, Erich; Jung, Dieter; Maass, Martin (1991). U-boats and Mine Warfare Vessels. German Warships 1815–1945. Vol. 2. Translated by Thomas, Keith; Magowan, Rachel. London: Conway Maritime Press. ISBN 0-85177-593-4.
- Kemp, Paul (1999). U-Boats Destroyed - German Submarine Losses in the World Wars. London: Arms & Armour. ISBN 1-85409-515-3.
- Williamson, Gordon (2006). Knight's Cross with Diamonds Recipients 1941–45. Oxford: Osprey. ISBN 1-84176-644-5.
