= Type IXA submarine =

German submarine class

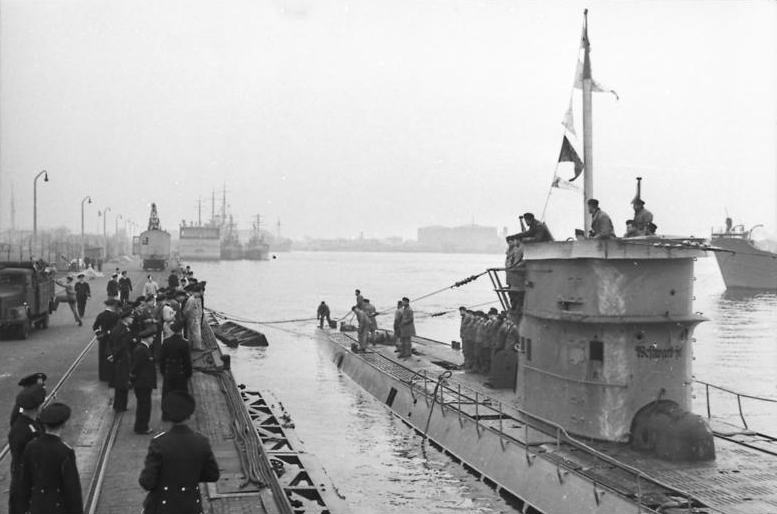
- U-37 docked at Wilhelmshaven on 18 April 1940

Class overview
- Operators: Kriegsmarine
- Preceded by: Type VII submarine
- Succeeded by: Type IXB submarine
- Built: 1937–1939
- In service: 1937–1945
- In commission: 1938–1945
- Planned: 8
- Completed: 8
- Lost: 6
- Scrapped: 2

General characteristics
- Displacement: 1,032 t (1,016 long tons) surfaced; 1,153 t (1,135 long tons) submerged
- Length: 76.50 m (251 ft) (o/a); 58.75 m (192 ft 9 in) (pressure hull)
- Beam: 6.51 m (21 ft 4 in) (o/a); 4.40 m (14 ft 5 in) (pressure hull)
- Height: 9.40 m (30 ft 10 in)
- Draft: 4.70 m (15 ft 5 in)
- Speed: 18.2 knots (33.7 km/h; 20.9 mph) surfaced; 7.7 knots (14.3 km/h; 8.9 mph) submerged
- Range: 10,500 nmi (19,400 km; 12,100 mi) at 10 knots (19 km/h; 12 mph) surfaced; 65–78 nmi (120–144 km; 75–90 mi) at 4 knots (7.4 km/h; 4.6 mph) submerged
- Armament: 6 × torpedo tubes (4 bow, 2 stern); 22 × 53.3 cm (21 in) torpedoes; 1 × 10.5 cm SK C/32 naval gun (180 rounds); various AA guns

The Type IXA submarine was a sub-class of the Type IX submarine built for Nazi Germany's Kriegsmarine between 1937 and 1938. These U-boats were designed between 1935 and 1936 and were intended to be fairly large ocean-going submarines. The inspiration for the Type IXA came from the Type I submarine, which had a similar diving depth and identical submerged horsepower.

Two of the eight Type IXA submarines built (U-37 and U-38) would become the sixth and tenth most successful U-boats that saw service in World War II, sinking 53 and 35 ships respectively. All of the Type IXA submarines were sunk fairly early in the war except for U-37 and U-38, which were scuttled in May 1945 to prevent them from falling into the hands of the Allies.

== Construction ==
Eight Type IXA submarines were ordered by the Kriegsmarine between 29 July 1936 and 21 November 1936 as part of the overall German plan of re-armament in violation of the Treaty of Versailles. The design of the IXA submarines was derived from the German Type IA submarine. All contracts for the construction of the submarines were awarded to DeSchiMAG AG Weser, Bremen. The first U-boat to be laid down in the Bremen ship yards was U-37, whose keel was laid down on 15 March 1937. The last U-boat to be laid down was U-44, whose construction began on 15 September 1937. By November 1939, all eight submarines had been fully constructed and commissioned into the Kriegsmarine.

== Design ==
=== General characteristics ===
The Type IXA submarines were the first German submarines to have a double hull. This allowed for a greater chance of survival in the event of an attack and gave them better seaworthiness on the surface. The Type IXA submarines had a test depth of 230 metres (750 ft). The class had two MAN M 9 V 40/46 supercharged 9-cylinder diesel engines that produced 4,400 PS (4,300 shp; 3,200 kW) as well as two SSW 2 GU 345/34 double-acting electric motors that produced 1,000 PS (986 shp; 735 kW) and allowed them to travel at 18.2 knots (33.7 km/h; 20.9 mph) while surfaced and 7.7 knots (14.3 km/h; 8.9 mph) submerged. The Type IXA submarines had a range of 10,500 nmi (19,400 km; 12,100 mi) at 10 knots (19 km/h; 12 mph) while on the surface and up to 78 nmi (144 km; 90 mi) at 4 knots (7.4 km/h; 4.6 mph) while submerged. The fuel capacity was 154 tonnes (152 long tons). The maximum crew capacity was 56, though the number on board was usually around 45–48.

=== Armament ===
The Type IXA submarines had six torpedo tubes (four in the bow and two in the stern) and carried a total of twenty-two 53.3 cm (21 in) torpedoes. The torpedo warhead was between 617 pounds (280 kg) and 948 pounds (430 kg). These torpedoes could travel up to 6,000 m (6,600 yd) and as fast as 44 knots (81 km/h). Twelve torpedoes were stowed internally and ten were in the topside deck containers. In order to get the torpedoes into the forward or bow torpedo room, the torpedoes were lifted over the U-boat by a crane. The crew would then pull the torpedo inside the vessel using a cradle that was set at an angle to allow the torpedo to slide into position inside the torpedo room. To reload a torpedo tube with a torpedo from one of the above-deck canisters, the submarine would have to surface in calm water. Then the torpedo would be pulled out of the compartment with winches and lowered into the forward or bow torpedo room. This process could take several hours for just one torpedo, during which the U-boat was unable to dive, making it an easy target for Allied aircraft.

The Type IXA submarines were equipped with a 10.5 cm (4.13 in) L/45 deck gun on a Utof mounting forward of the conning tower. Shell storage was 180 rounds. The gun fired a 33.3-pound (15.1 kg) HE round at a muzzle velocity of 780 m/s (2,600 ft/s) out to a maximum range of 15,175 m (16,596 yd). Against aircraft the weapon's ceiling was 10,000 m (11,000 yd). Training and elevation was manual. The rate of fire was 15 rounds per minute. They were also armed with 2 cm FlaK 30 and 3.7 cm (1.5 in) anti-aircraft guns. The 2 cm FlaK 30 guns had a range of 4,900 metres (5,400 yd) firing at up to 280 rounds per minute; firing against aircraft the ceiling was reduced to 3,700 m. The muzzle velocity was 835 m/s (2,740 ft/s) and each round weighed 0.71 pounds (0.32 kg). The 3.7 cm SK C/30U had a range of 8,500 metres (9,300 yd) and a firing rate of 30 rounds per minute. Its muzzle velocity was 1,000 m/s (3,300 ft/s) and the shell's total weight was 1.64 lb (0.74 kg).

== List of Type IXA U-boats ==
The Type IXA class had eight U-boats, all of which were built by AG Weser of Bremen. After being commissioned and deployed, the Type IXA submarines were initially stationed in the German port city of Wilhelmshaven.

Name	Hull builder	Ordered	Laid down	Launched	Commissioned	Fate
U-37	AG Weser, Bremen	29 July 1936	15 March 1937	14 May 1938	4 August 1938	Scuttled, 8 May 1945.
U-38	AG Weser, Bremen	29 July 1936	15 April 1937	9 August 1938	24 October 1938	Scuttled 5 May 1945 west of Wesermünde and broken up in 1948.
U-39	AG Weser, Bremen	29 July 1936	2 June 1937	22 September 1938	10 December 1938	Sunk on 14 September 1939 northwest of Ireland. All crew members survived.
U-40	AG Weser, Bremen	29 July 1936	1 July 1937	9 November 1938	11 February 1939	Sunk on 13 October 1939 in the English Channel by mines. 45 dead and 3 survivors.
U-41	AG Weser, Bremen	21 November 1936	27 November 1937	28 January 1939	22 April 1939	Sunk on 5 February 1940 south of Ireland. All 49 of her crew went down with the submarine.
U-42	AG Weser, Bremen	21 November 1936	21 December 1937	16 February 1939	15 July 1939	Sunk on 13 October 1939 southwest of Ireland. 22 dead and 20 survivors.
U-43	AG Weser, Bremen	21 November 1936	15 August 1938	23 May 1939	26 August 1939	Sunk southwest of the Azores, 30 July 1943. 55 dead.
U-44	AG Weser, Bremen	21 November 1936	15 September 1938	5 August 1939	4 November 1939	Sunk by a mine on 13 March 1940 off the coast of the Netherlands. All crew members were lost.

=== U-37 ===
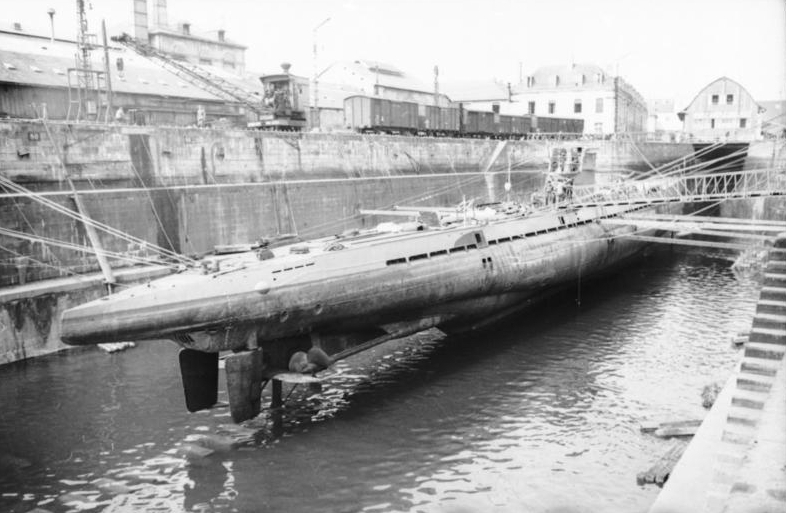
U-37 at Lorient in 1940.

U-37 was laid down by AG Weser of Bremen on 15 March 1937. Following just over a year of construction, she was launched from the Bremen shipyards on 14 May 1938 and commissioned into the Kriegsmarine on 4 August 1938 under the command of Kapitänleutnant Heinrich Schuch as a member of the 6th U-boat Flotilla. U-37 was by far the most successful Type IXA U-boat and the sixth most successful U-boat in World War II, sinking 53 merchant ships for a total of 200,063 gross register tons (GRT), along with two warships during eleven war patrols from August 1939 to March 1941. In spite of these victories, U-37 was later withdrawn from combat service and was used for training submarine crews until the end of the war. On 8 May 1945, the crew of U-37 scuttled the U-boat in Sonderburg Bay off Flensburg to keep her from falling into the hands of the Allies.

=== U-38 ===
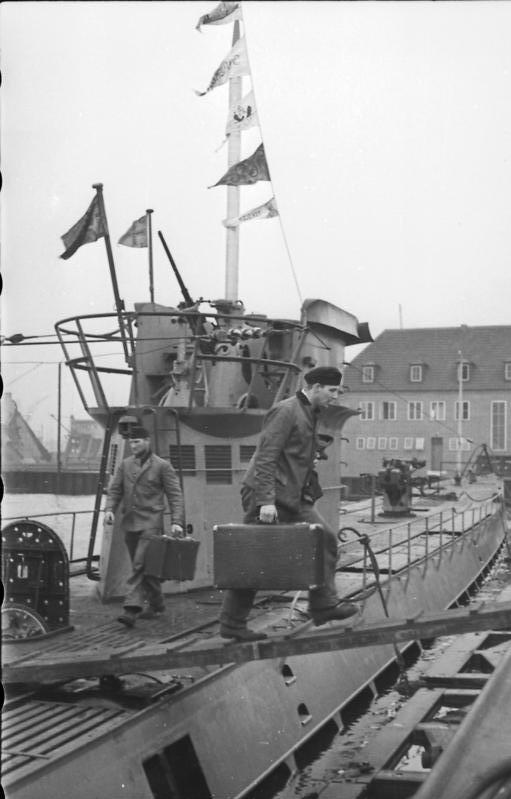
The crew of U-38 departing the submarine after reaching Wilhelmshaven on 18 April 1940

The keel for U-38 was laid down on 15 April 1937 and after over a year and a half of construction she was commissioned on 24 October 1938 with Oberleutnant zur See Heinrich Liebe in command. Upon commissioning, U-38 was assigned to the 6th U-boat Flotilla. Like U-37, U-38 conducted eleven patrols. During these patrols she managed to sink or damage over 30 enemy vessels. Like U-37, U-38 ranks as one of the most successful U-boats of World War II, holding 10th place. With World War II drawing to a disastrous close for Germany, U-38 was scuttled by her own crew west of Wesermünde on 5 May 1945.

=== U-39 ===
The keel for U-39 was laid down on 2 June 1937. She was commissioned over a year later on 10 December 1938 with Kapitänleutnant Gerhard Glattes in command as a member of the 6th U-boat Flotilla. On 14 September 1939, just days after she began her first war time patrol, U-39 was hunted down by the British destroyers HMS Faulknor, HMS Firedrake, and HMS Foxhound and disabled with depth charges after she attempted to sink the British aircraft carrier HMS Ark Royal. All of her crew members survived and were captured by the British. U-39 was the first German U-boat to be sunk in World War II.

=== U-40 ===
U-40 was ordered for construction on 29 July 1936 and her keel was laid down on 1 July 1937. She was launched from Bremen on 9 November 1938 and commissioned on 11 February 1939 with Kapitänleutnant Werner von Schmidt in command. U-40 conducted only two war patrols during her career, both while part of the 6th U-boat Flotilla. During her short war-time service, U-40 sank no ships. She sank on 13 October 1939 after hitting mines in the English Channel while attempting a short cut to a rendezvous with other U-boats.

=== U-41 ===
U-41 was laid down on 27 November 1937 and was launched on 28 January 1939. She was commissioned into the Kriegsmarine on 22 April 1939 under the command of Oberleutnant zur See Gustav-Adolf Mugler. U-41 only undertook three war patrols, two as part of the 6th U-boat Flotilla and one as a member of the 2nd U-boat Flotilla. During her brief career she sank five enemy vessels for a total of 22,815 GRT, captured two more ships for a total of 2,073 GRT, and damaged one ship of 8,096 GRT. On 5 February 1940, U-41 was sunk after a depth charge attack by the British destroyer HMS Antelope off the coast of Ireland. All 49 crew members were lost with the ship.

=== U-42 ===
U-42 was ordered by the Kriegsmarine on 21 November 1936. Her keel was laid down on 21 December 1937 by AG Weser of Bremen as yard number 947. She was launched on 16 February 1939 and commissioned on 15 July 1939 with Kapitänleutnant Rolf Dau in command of the vessel. U-42 had a very short career, being sunk while still on her first war patrol. During her service with the Kriegsmarine, U-42 conducted only one training patrol and one war patrol, during which she damaged one enemy vessel of 4,803 GRT. Both of U-42's patrols were as a member of the 6th U-boat Flotilla. On 13 October 1939, U-42 was sunk southwest of Ireland by the British warships HMS Imogen and HMS Ilex. Out of a crew of 46, twenty survived and 26 went down with the submarine.

=== U-43 ===
The keel for U-43 was laid down on 15 August 1938 at the AG Weser yard at Bremen; she was launched on 23 May 1939 and commissioned on 26 August 1939 under the command of Kapitänleutnant Wilhelm Ambrosius. Between November 1939 and July 1943 the U-boat conducted 14 combat patrols as a member of the 6. Unterseebootsflottile and later the 2. Unterseebootsflottile, sinking 21 merchant ships for a total of 117,036 GRT, damaging one ship of 10,350 GRT and another of 9,131 GRT, enough for it to be declared a total loss. U-43 was sunk on 30 July 1943 southwest of the Azores by a torpedo dropped by a United States Navy aircraft from the escort carrier Santee; all 55 hands were lost.

=== U-44 ===
U-44 was ordered by the Kriegsmarine on 21 November 1936 and was laid down on 15 September 1938 by AG Weser, Bremen as yard number 949. She was launched on 5 August 1939 and commissioned on 4 November under the command of Kapitänleutnant Ludwig Mathes. During her service in the Kriegsmarine, U-44 conducted only two war patrols (one as part of the 6th U-boat Flotilla and another as a member of the 2nd U-boat Flotilla) and sank a total of eight enemy vessels for a loss of 30,885 GRT. On 13 March 1940, U-44 struck a mine that was located in Minefield Number 7 off the north coast of the Netherlands. All 47 of U-44's crew members went down with the submarine.

== See also ==
- German Type IX submarine

== Bibliography ==
- Bishop, Chris (2002). The Encyclopedia of Weapons of WWII: The Comprehensive Guide to Over 1,500 Weapons Systems, Including Tanks, Small Arms, Warplanes, Artillery, Ships, and Submarines. Sterling Publishing Company. ISBN 978-1-58663-762-0.
- Busch, Rainer & Röll, Hans-Joachim (1997). Der U-Bootbau auf deutschen Werften. Der U-Boot-Krieg (in German). Vol. II. Hamburg; Berlin; Bonn: Mittler. ISBN 3-8132-0512-6.
- Gröner, Erich; Jung, Dieter & Maass, Martin (1991). U-boats and mine warfare vessels. German Warships 1815–1945. Vol. 2. Translated by Thomas, Keith & Magowan, Rachel. London: Conway Maritime Press. ISBN 0-85177-593-4.
