= German ship Doggerbank =

British cargo ship sunk in 1943

Coordinates: 29°10′00″N 34°10′00″W

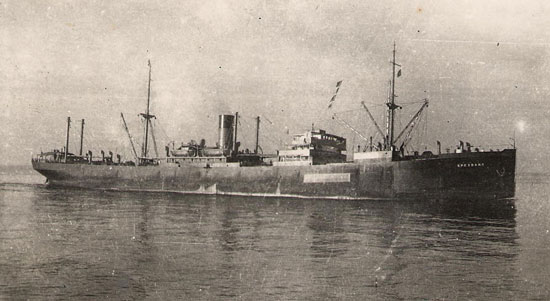

History

United Kingdom
- Name: Speybank
- Owner: Andrew Weir & Co
- Operator: Bank Line
- Port of registry: Glasgow
- Builder: Harland & Wolff, Govan
- Yard number: 686
- Launched: 25 February 1926
- Completed: 20 April 1926
- Renamed: Doggerbank, 1941
- Identification: UK official number 148902; Code letters KTWS (until 1933); Call sign GLQF (1934 onward)
- Fate: Captured, 31 January 1941

Germany
- Name: Doggerbank
- Namesake: Dogger Bank
- In service: 1941
- Fate: Sunk by torpedoes, 3 March 1943

General characteristics
- Class & type: Inverbank-class cargo ship
- Tonnage: 5,154 GRT, 3,154 NRT
- Length: 420.3 ft (128.1 m)
- Beam: 53.9 ft (16.4 m)
- Draught: 29 ft 2 in (8.9 m)
- Depth: 26.5 ft (8.1 m)
- Installed power: 717 NHP
- Propulsion: 2 × 4-stroke diesel engines; 2 × screws
- Speed: 12 knots (22 km/h)
- Complement: 108 (1943)

The German ship Doggerbank (Schiff 53) was a British cargo ship that was built in Scotland in 1926, captured by the Kriegsmarine (German Navy) in 1941, renamed Doggerbank and converted into an auxiliary minelayer and blockade runner. The German U-43 sank her by mistake in 1943, leading to the deaths of all but one of her 257 passengers and 108 crew.

Doggerbank was built in Scotland in 1926 as Speybank, one of 18 Inverbank-class motor ships for Andrew Weir & Co's Bank Line. She was the first of three Bank Line ships that were called Speybank. The second was built in England in 1962 and sold in 1978. The third was built in 1983 as Okha, bought in 1995 and renamed Speybank, and was still in service in 2009.

== Building ==
Harland & Wolff built Speybank at Govan, Glasgow, launching her on 25 February 1926 and completing her on 20 April that year. Her registered length was 420.3 ft (128.1 m), her beam was 53.9 ft (16.4 m) and her depth was 26.5 ft (8.1 m). Her tonnages were 5,154 GRT and 3,154 NRT. She had twin screws, each driven by a six-cylinder single-acting diesel engine. Between them the twin engines developed 717 NHP and gave her a speed of 12 knots (22 km/h).

Andrew Weir & Co registered Speybank in Glasgow. Her United Kingdom official number was 148902 and her code letters were KTWS. By 1930 she was equipped for wireless telegraphy and in 1934 she was given the new call sign GLQF, which also superseded her code letters.

== Capture ==
On 31 January 1941 the German commerce raider Atlantis captured Speybank in the Indian Ocean and put aboard a prize crew commanded by Kapitänleutnant Paul Schneidewind. He took her to German-occupied France, reaching Bordeaux on 10 May 1941. The Kriegsmarine renamed her Doggerbank – Schiff 53 (Ship 53) and converted to an auxiliary minelayer. She was disguised with false name Levernbank, which was another member of Bank Line's Inverbank class. She remained under Schneidewind's command. Doggerbank left France in January 1942 to lay mines off the coast of South Africa and then to proceed to Japan. She laid the mines in March and April 1942 and reached Japan later that year. On 13 March the Royal Navy cruiser HMS Durban stopped Doggerbank. Doggerbank identified herself as the Bank Line ship Levernbank, which satisfied Durban, who let her continue. The next day the armed merchant cruiser HMS Cheshire challenged Doggerbank which again identified herself as a British freighter and Cheshire let her proceed.

== Final voyage ==
In Japan, Doggerbank took aboard many of the survivors of the auxiliary cruiser Thor and the German tanker Uckermark, the former Altmark, which had been destroyed in an accident in Yokohama on 30 November 1942. When she left the Far East, Doggerbank carried 365 men, her crew of 108, plus 257 men from the other two ships. She also carried a cargo of 7,000 long tons (7,100 t) of raw materials and rubber, fats and fish oil. Doggerbank travelled via Kobe, Saigon, Singapore and Jakarta, which she left on 10 January 1943, heading back to France. In mid-Atlantic on 3 March 1943, she was travelling ahead of schedule and the moving safety grid that protected it from inadvertent attack, when the U-boat U-43 mistook her for a British ship "of the Dunedin Star type". U-43 fired a spread of three torpedoes, all three of which hit her. She sank within two minutes, with perhaps 200 men killed instantly.

== Aftermath ==
U-43 saw Doggerbank launch five lifeboats, and tried to find the survivors, but failed to get close enough in the darkness. Doggerbank had been unable to transmit a distress signal Oberkommando der Marine (Naval High Command) took days to realise she had been lost. The eventual survivor of the crew of 108 and the 257 others on board, Fritz Kürt, got aboard Doggerbank's jolly boat, together with fourteen survivors, including the captain, Schneidewind and Leo. the ship's dog. The crew put up a sail and headed for the South American coast, to exploit the trade winds, that was about three weeks' sailing away. Eleven days later, the boat capsized in a storm and eight men and Leo drowned. Four men asked Schneidewind to shoot them, which he did then shot himself. The boat was reduced to two occupants, Kürt and an old sailor by the name of Boywitt. Desperate for water and food, Boywitt drank sea water on the 19th day of their journey and died, while Kürt was too weak to even roll his body overboard. Kürt was rescued on 29 March by the Spanish motor tanker Campoamor, which took him to the Dutch island of Aruba off the coast of Venezuela. U-43 was sunk on 30 July 1943 without survivors. Kürt was exchanged in a prisoner-of-war swap in 1944, reported to the German Navy and then hid in Hamburg until the end of the war, as he was about to be arrested.

== Bibliography ==
- Blair, Clay (1997) [1996]. Hitler's U-Boat War: The Hunters 1939–1942. London: Weidenfeld & Nicolson. ISBN 0-297-84076-2.
- Gibson, Charles (1965). The Ship with Five Names. London: Abelard Schuman. OCLC 1368775.
- Stilgoe, John R (2003). Lifeboat. Charlottesville: University of Virginia Press. ISBN 0-8139-2221-6.
