= MV Brazza =

French cargo liner sunk in 1940

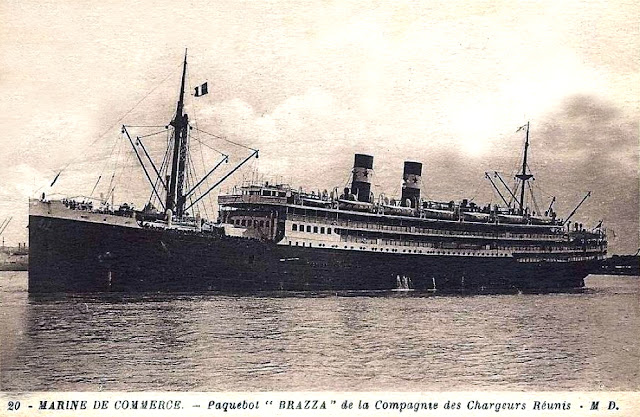
- A postcard of Brazza

History

France
- Name: 1923: Camranh; 1927: Brazza
- Namesake: 1923: Cam Ranh; 1927: Pierre Savorgnan de Brazza
- Owner: Chargeurs Réunis
- Port of registry: Le Havre
- Builder: A&C de la Loire, Nantes
- Yard number: 544
- Launched: 10 November 1923
- Completed: November 1924
- Refit: 1927, 1936
- Identification: until 1933: code letters OUWS; by 1934: call sign FNLS
- Fate: sunk by torpedo, 1942

General characteristics
- Type: 1923: cargo motor ship; 1927: cargo liner
- Tonnage: 1926: 8,898 GRT, 5,450 NRT; 1928: 10,193 GRT, 6,086 NRT; 1937: 10,387 GRT, 6,206 NRT
- Length: 1923: 453.1 ft (138.1 m); 1937: 474.4 ft (144.6 m)
- Beam: 59.1 ft (18.0 m)
- Depth: 36.1 ft (11.0 m)
- Decks: 3
- Installed power: 2 × two-stroke diesel engines, 1,002 NHP
- Propulsion: 2 × screws
- Speed: 12 knots (22 km/h)
- Capacity: 1927: passengers: 178 × 1st class; 90 × 2nd class; 90 × 3rd class; 1928: cargo: included 2,048 cu ft (58 m^{3}) refrigerated
- Crew: 1940: 132
- Sensors & processing systems: by 1931: wireless direction finding
- Armament: by 1940: 2 × 90 mm guns on poop

MV Brazza was a French merchant ship. She was the first motor ship in fleet of Chargeurs Réunis. She was built in Nantes in 1924 as the cargo ship Camranh, and rebuilt in Saint-Nazaire in 1927 as the cargo liner Brazza. A U-boat sank her in 1940, killing 379 of her passengers and crew.

She was the first of two Chargeurs ships to be named after the French explorer Pierre Savorgnan de Brazza. The second was a motor ship that was launched in 1947, sold to the French Navy in 1965, renamed Maurienne, and scrapped in 1975.

== Camranh ==
Ateliers et Chantiers de la Loire in Nantes built the ship in 1923. As built, her registered length was 453.1 ft (138.1 m), her beam was 59.1 ft (18.0 m), her depth was 36.1 ft (11.0 m), and her tonnages were 8,898 GRT, 5,450 NRT. She had twin screws, each driven by a Sulzer four-cylinder, single-acting, two-stroke diesel engine. The combined power of her twin engines was rated at 1,002 NHP, and gave her a speed of 12 knots (22 km/h).

The ship was named Camranh, after the city of Cam Ranh in French Indochina. Chargeurs registered her at Le Havre. Her code letters were OUWS. She was the first motor ship in Chargeurs's fleet. By January 1925, she had travelled 84,000 nautical miles (156,000 km).

== Brazza ==
In 1927, Chargeurs had Ateliers et Chantiers de Saint-Nazaire Penhoët refit Camranh as a cargo liner. Her superstructure was enlarged, with the addition of berths for 358 passengers: 178 first class, 90 second class, and 90 third class. Dyle et Bacalan supplied equipment to refrigerate 2,048 cu ft (58 m^{3}) of her cargo space. Dyle et Bacalan used the J & E Hall refrigeration system, in which carbo dioxide is the coolant, and cork and brine are the insulating materials. As refitted, she had twin funnels; her tonnages were increased to 10,193 GRT and 6,086 NRT; and she was renamed Brazza.

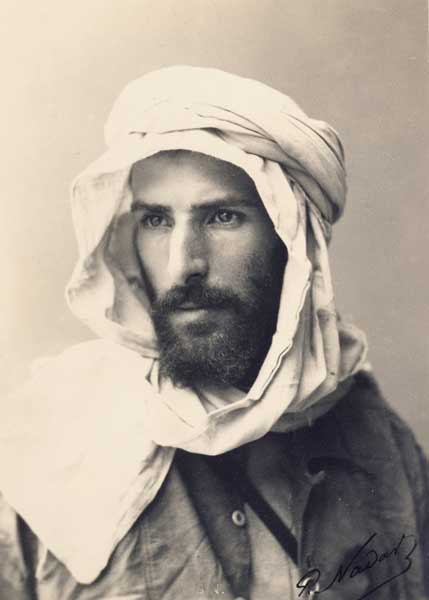
Pierre Savorgnan de Brazza (1852–1905)

In 1927, Brazza's route was advertised as Bordeaux to Matadi in French Congo; via Dakar; Conakry; Tabou; Grand-Bassam; Lomé; Cotonou; Souellaba (now Douala); Libreville; Port-Gentil; Pointe-Noire; Banana; and Boma.

By 1931, Brazza was equipped with wireless direction finding. By 1934, her wireless telegraph call sign was FNLS, and this had superseded her code letters. In 1936, Chargeurs had her hull lengthened to 474.4 ft (144.6 m). This increased her tonnages to 10,387 GRT and 6,206 NRT.

In 1936, Brazza's route was advertised as Bordeaux to Pointe-Noire via Funchal; Tenerife; Dakar; Conakry; Tabou; Sassandra; Port Bouët; Accra; Lomé; Cotonou; Souellaba; Libreville; and Port-Gentil. However, no sailing dates were listed.

== Loss ==
On 26 May 1940, during the Battle of France, Brazza left Bordeaux for New Caledonia in the South Pacific, via Casablanca, Dakar, and ports in West Africa. Her Master was Captain François Pierre Marie Rébillard, CdG. She carried 132 crew and 444 passengers. Her passengers were a mixture of French Navy and French Army personnel, and civilians. She also carried 850 tons of general cargo, including wine, spirits, and 1,000 bags of mail. The aviso Enseigne Henry escorted her.

On 28 May, the two ships were about 80 nautical miles (150 km) west of Cape Finisterre, making 12 knots (22 km/h) and steering a zig-zag course in a rough sea. At 09:24 hrs (Berlin time), U-37 fired two torpedoes from its stern tubes. Both hit Brazza's starboard side, just aft of her second funnel. She caught fire, and rapidly listed ten degrees to starboard. Within minutes, this increased to 40 degrees, making it impossible to launch the lifeboats on her port side. Within five minutes of being hit, she sank at position 42°43′N 11°00′W, stern first, with her bow almost vertical.

Enseigne Henry launched her whaleboat and dinghy to find and rescue survivors in the water. The boats were hampered by the rough sea, and by survivors being widely dispersed. Nevertheless, 197 survivors were found; many of them clinging to wreckage. 52 crew members; 47 civilian passengers; and 98 armed forces passengers were rescued. The civilian survivors included 19 women and eight children, and the armed forces passengers were 56 members of the French Navy; 17 from the French Army; and 25 troupes coloniales.

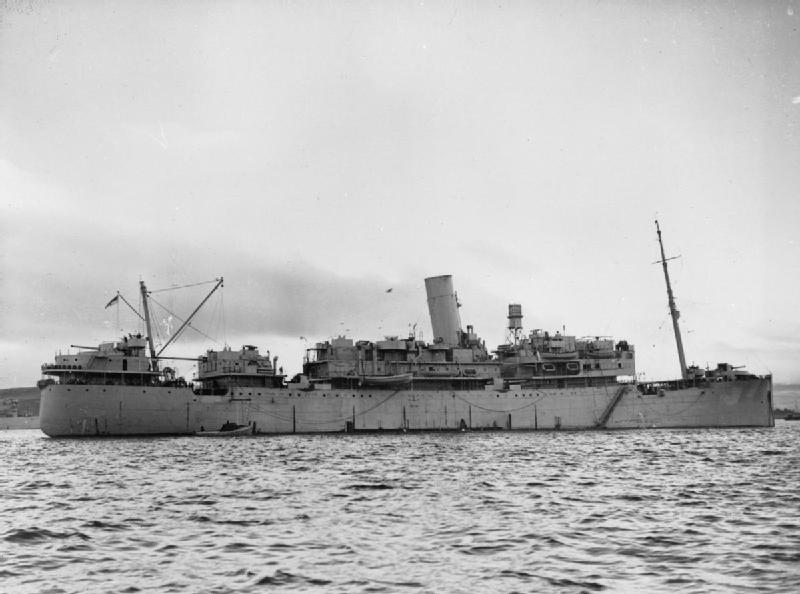
The armed merchant cruiser HMS Cheshire

The Royal Navy armed merchant cruiser HMS Cheshire was on patrol off Vigo, and was diverted to assist Enseigne Henry. Cheshire arrived after four hours, and screened the aviso until the last survivors were rescued at 13:50 hrs. Captain Rébillard, 79 members of his crew, and 299 passengers were lost. Enseigne Henry landed survivors at Lorient on 30 May.

== Bibliography ==
- Lloyd's Register of Shipping. Vol. II.–Steamers and Motorships. London: Lloyd's Register of Shipping. 1926 – via Internet Archive.
- Lloyd's Register of Shipping. Vol. I.–Sailing Vessels. London: Lloyd's Register of Shipping. 1928 – via Internet Archive.
- Lloyd's Register of Shipping. Vol. II.–Steamers and Motorships. London: Lloyd's Register of Shipping. 1928 – via Internet Archive.
- Lloyd's Register of Shipping (PDF). Vol. II.–Steamers and Motorships. London: Lloyd's Register of Shipping. 1931 – via Southampton City Council.
- Lloyd's Register of Shipping (PDF). Vol. II.–Steamers and Motorships. London: Lloyd's Register of Shipping. 1934 – via Southampton City Council.
- Lloyd's Register of Shipping (PDF). Vol. II.–Steamers and Motorships. London: Lloyd's Register of Shipping. 1937 – via Southampton City Council.
- Raclot, Michèle (2010). 28 mai 1940; le jour où le Brazza s'est englouti (in French). Paris: Éditions L'Harmattan. ISBN 978-2-296-13170-5.
