= German submarine U-40 (1938) =

German submarine sunk by a mine in the English Channel

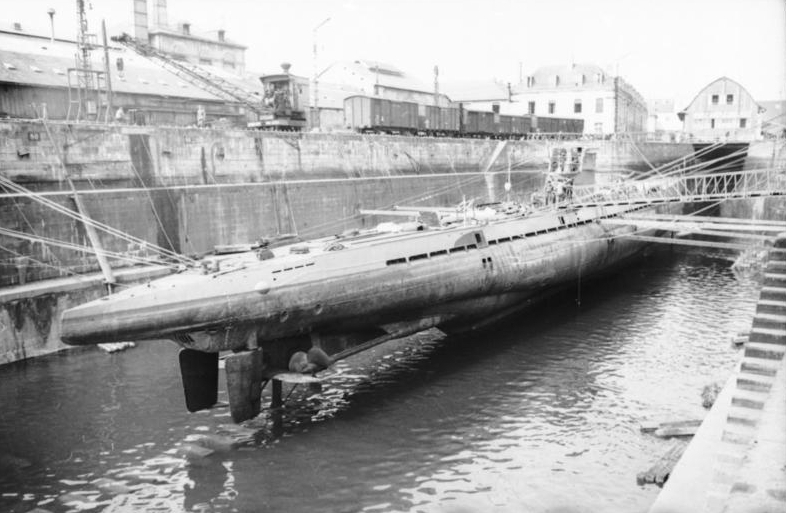
- U-37, (an identical U-boat to U-40) at Lorient in 1940

History

Nazi Germany
- Name: U-40
- Ordered: 29 July 1936
- Builder: DeSchiMAG AG Weser, Bremen
- Yard number: 945
- Laid down: 1 July 1937
- Launched: 9 November 1938
- Commissioned: 11 February 1939
- Fate: Sunk on 13 October 1939 in the English Channel by a mine. 45 men died, three survived

General characteristics
- Class & type: Type IXA submarine
- Displacement: 1,032 t (1,016 long tons) surfaced; 1,153 t (1,135 long tons) submerged
- Length: 76.50 m (251 ft) o/a; 58.75 m (192 ft 9 in) pressure hull
- Beam: 6.51 m (21 ft 4 in) o/a; 4.40 m (14 ft 5 in) pressure hull
- Height: 9.40 m (30 ft 10 in)
- Draught: 4.70 m (15 ft 5 in)
- Installed power: 4,400 PS (3,200 kW; 4,300 bhp) (diesels); 1,000 PS (740 kW; 990 shp) (electric)
- Propulsion: 2 shafts; 2 × diesel engines; 2 × electric motors
- Speed: 18.2 knots (33.7 km/h; 20.9 mph) surfaced; 7.7 knots (14.3 km/h; 8.9 mph) submerged
- Range: 10,500 nmi (19,400 km; 12,100 mi) at 10 knots (19 km/h; 12 mph) surfaced; 65–78 nmi (120–144 km; 75–90 mi) at 4 knots (7.4 km/h; 4.6 mph) submerged
- Test depth: 230 m (750 ft)
- Complement: 4 officers, 44 enlisted
- Armament: 6 × torpedo tubes (4 bow, 2 stern); 22 × 53.3 cm (21 in) torpedoes; 1 × 10.5 cm SK C/32 naval gun (180 rounds); 1 × 3.7 cm (1.5 in) SK C/30 AA gun; 1 × twin 2 cm FlaK 30 AA guns

Service record
- Part of: 6th U-boat Flotilla; 11 February – 13 October 1939
- Identification codes: M 19 297
- Commanders: Kptlt. Werner von Schmidt; 11 February – 20 September 1939; Kptlt. Wolfgang Barten; 21 September – 13 October 1939
- Operations: 2 patrols: 1st patrol: 19 August – 18 September 1939; 2nd patrol: 10 – 13 October 1939
- Victories: No ships sunk or damaged

German submarine U-40 was a Type IXA U-boat of Nazi Germany's Kriegsmarine that operated during World War II.

U-40 was built in Bremen by DeSchiMAG AG Weser as yard number 945. She was launched in November 1938 and commissioned in February 1939.

U-40 conducted two war patrols during her career. Both of which were part of the 6th U-boat Flotilla. During her short time in the war, she sank no ships.

U-40 was sunk on 13 October 1939 by a mine in the English Channel.

== Design ==
As one of the eight original Type IX submarines, later designated IXA, U-40 had a displacement of 1,032 tonnes (1,016 long tons) when at the surface and 1,153 tonnes (1,135 long tons) while submerged. The U-boat had a total length of 76.50 m (251 ft), a pressure hull length of 58.75 m (192 ft 9 in), a beam of 6.51 m (21 ft 4 in), a height of 9.40 m (30 ft 10 in), and a draught of 4.70 m (15 ft 5 in). The submarine was powered by two MAN M 9 V 40/46 supercharged four-stroke, nine-cylinder diesel engines producing a total of 4,400 metric horsepower (3,240 kW; 4,340 shp) for use while surfaced, two Siemens-Schuckert 2 GU 345/34 double-acting electric motors producing a total of 1,000 metric horsepower (740 kW; 990 shp) for use while submerged. She had two shafts and two 1.92 m (6 ft) propellers. The boat was capable of operating at depths of up to 230 metres (750 ft).

The submarine had a maximum surface speed of 18.2 knots (33.7 km/h; 20.9 mph) and a maximum submerged speed of 7.7 knots (14.3 km/h; 8.9 mph). When submerged, the boat could operate for 65–78 nautical miles (120–144 km; 75–90 mi) at 4 knots (7.4 km/h; 4.6 mph); when surfaced, she could travel 10,500 nautical miles (19,400 km; 12,100 mi) at 10 knots (19 km/h; 12 mph). U-40 was fitted with six 53.3 cm (21 in) torpedo tubes (four fitted at the bow and two at the stern), 22 torpedoes, one 10.5 cm (4.13 in) SK C/32 naval gun, 180 rounds, and a 3.7 cm (1.5 in) SK C/30 as well as a 2 cm (0.79 in) C/30 anti-aircraft gun. The boat had a complement of forty-eight.

== Service history ==
U-40 was ordered by the Kriegsmarine on 29 July 1936 (as part of Plan Z and in violation of the Treaty of Versailles). Her kneel was laid down on 1 July 1937. U-40 was launched on 9 November 1938 and commissioned on 11 February 1939 under the command of Kapitänleutnant Werner von Schmidt.

After being commissioned and deployed, U-40 was stationed in the German port city of Wilhelmshaven, which to be her home for the rest of her fairly short service life.

=== Patrols ===
U-40 left Wilhelmshaven on 19 August 1939, before World War II began, for her first patrol. For nearly four weeks she operated off the coast of Gibraltar, before returning home on 18 September that same year. U-40 would once again leave Wilhelmshaven, this time under the command of Kapitänleutnant Wolfgang Barten, on 10 October 1939. During this patrol, she was to conduct joint operations off the coasts of Portugal and Spain.

=== Fate ===
On 13 October 1939, U-40 was sunk by a British mine at 50°41′6″N 00°15′1″E. She was to operate as part of the first pack of U-boats in World War II; however, because she left port late, Barten decided to take a shortcut to the U-boat's designated meeting point, southwest of Ireland. This shortcut was through the English Channel, which was festooned with many British naval mines. Choosing to make the voyage nearly three and a half hours after high tide, the mines were not at their lowest point. The boat struck one of these devices and sank immediately to the sea floor. Nevertheless, nine crew members were able to exit through the aft escape hatch. Using escape equipment, they were able to reach the surface; one of the nine died on his journey. Once there, five more died from exposure to the harsh elements of the English Channel. Nearly ten hours after the sinking, the remaining three men were rescued and taken prisoner by HMS Boreas.

== Bibliography ==
- Busch, Rainer; Röll, Hans-Joachim (1999). German U-boat commanders of World War II : a biographical dictionary. Translated by Brooks, Geoffrey. London, Annapolis, Md: Greenhill Books, Naval Institute Press. ISBN 1-55750-186-6.
- Busch, Rainer; Röll, Hans-Joachim (1999). Deutsche U-Boot-Verluste von September 1939 bis Mai 1945 [German U-boat losses from September 1939 to May 1945]. Der U-Boot-Krieg (in German). Vol. IV. Hamburg, Berlin, Bonn: Mittler. ISBN 3-8132-0514-2.
- Gröner, Erich; Jung, Dieter; Maass, Martin (1991). U-boats and Mine Warfare Vessels. German Warships 1815–1945. Vol. 2. Translated by Thomas, Keith; Magowan, Rachel. London: Conway Maritime Press. ISBN 0-85177-593-4.
- Kemp, Paul (1999). U-Boats Destroyed - German Submarine Losses in the World Wars. London: Arms & Armour. ISBN 1-85409-515-3.
