= German submarine U-37 (1938) =

German World War II submarine

Coordinates: 54°55′N 09°47′E

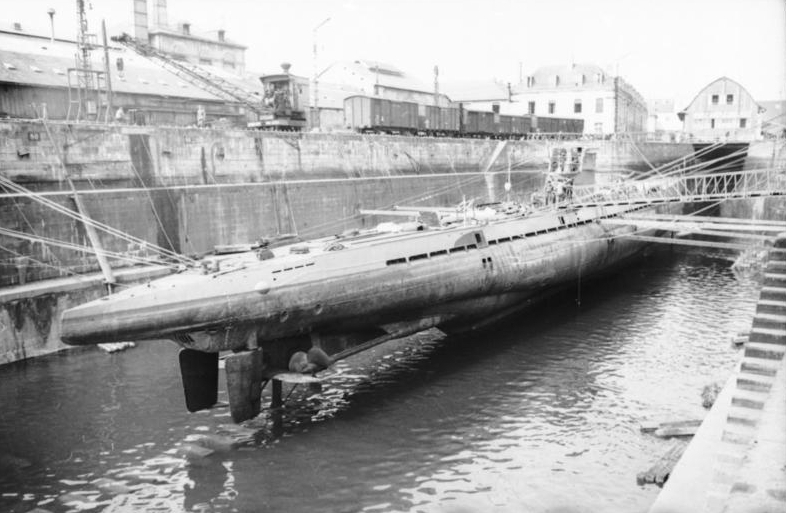
- U-37 at Lorient in 1940

History

Nazi Germany
- Name: U-37
- Ordered: 29 July 1936
- Builder: DeSchiMAG AG Weser, Bremen
- Yard number: 942
- Laid down: 15 March 1937
- Launched: 14 May 1938
- Commissioned: 4 August 1938
- Fate: Scuttled, 5 May 1945

General characteristics
- Class & type: Type IXA submarine
- Displacement: 1,032 t (1,016 long tons) surfaced; 1,153 t (1,135 long tons) submerged
- Length: 58.75 m (192 ft 9 in) pressure hull
- Beam: 6.51 m (21 ft 4 in) o/a
- Height: 9.40 m (30 ft 10 in)
- Draught: 4.70 m (15 ft 5 in)
- Installed power: 4,400 PS (3,200 kW; 4,300 bhp) (from two diesel engines); 1,000 PS (740 kW; 990 shp) (from two electric motors)
- Propulsion: Two shafts
- Speed: 18.2 knots (33.7 km/h; 20.9 mph) surfaced; 7.7 knots (14.3 km/h; 8.9 mph) submerged
- Range: 10,500 nmi (19,400 km; 12,100 mi) at 10 knots (19 km/h; 12 mph) surfaced
- Test depth: 230 m (750 ft)
- Complement: 4 officers, 44 enlisted
- Armament: 6 × torpedo tubes (4 bow, 2 stern); 22 × torpedoes; 1 × 10.5 cm SK C/32 naval gun; 2 × anti-aircraft guns

German submarine U-37 was a Type IXA U-boat of the German Navy (Kriegsmarine) during World War II. The submarine was laid down on 15 March 1937 at the DeSchiMAG AG Weser yard in Bremen, launched on 14 May 1938, and commissioned on 4 August 1938 as part of the 6th U-boat Flotilla.

Between August 1939 and March 1941, U-37 conducted eleven combat patrols, sinking 53 merchant ships, for a total of 200,063 gross register tons (GRT); and two warships, the British Hastings-class sloop HMS Penzance, and the French submarine Sfax. U-37 was then withdrawn from front-line service and assigned to training units until the end of the war. On 5 May 1945 the U-boat was scuttled. U-37 was the sixth most successful U-boat in World War II in terms of tonnage sunk.

== Design and construction ==
As one of the eight original Type IX submarines, later designated IXA, U-37 had a displacement of 1,032 tonnes (1,016 long tons) when at the surface and 1,153 tonnes (1,135 long tons) while submerged. The U-boat had a total length of 76.50 metres (251 ft 0 in), a pressure hull length of 58.75 m (192 ft 9 in), a beam of 6.51 m (21 ft 4 in), a height of 9.40 m (30 ft 10 in), and a draught of 4.70 m (15 ft 5 in). The submarine was powered by two MAN M 9 V 40/46 supercharged four-stroke, nine-cylinder diesel engines producing a total of 4,400 metric horsepower (3,240 kW; 4,340 shp) for use while surfaced, two Siemens-Schuckert 2 GU 345/34 double-acting electric motors producing a total of 1,000 metric horsepower (740 kW; 990 shp) for use while submerged. She had two shafts and two 1.92 m (6 ft 4 in) propellers. The boat was capable of operating at depths of up to 230 metres (750 ft).

The submarine had a maximum surface speed of 18.2 knots (33.7 km/h; 20.9 mph) and a maximum submerged speed of 7.7 knots (14.3 km/h; 8.9 mph). When submerged, the boat could operate for 65–78 nautical miles (120–144 km; 75–90 mi) at 4 knots (7.4 km/h; 4.6 mph); when surfaced, she could travel 10,500 nautical miles (19,400 km; 12,100 mi) at 10 knots (19 km/h; 12 mph). U-37 was fitted with six 53.3 cm (21 in) torpedo tubes (four fitted at the bow and two at the stern), 22 torpedoes, one 10.5 cm (4.13 in) SK C/32 naval gun, 180 rounds, and a 3.7 cm (1.5 in) as well as a 2 cm (0.79 in) C/30 anti-aircraft gun. The boat had a complement of forty-eight.

U-37 was one of four Type IX submarines ordered on 29 July 1936. The submarine was laid down at AG Weser's Bremen shipyard on 15 March 1937, as yard number 942. She was launched on 14 May 1938 and commissioned on 4 August 1938.

== Service history ==
=== First patrol ===
In preparation for the German invasion of Poland and potential war with the United Kingdom and France, Admiral Karl Dönitz, commander of Germany's submarine forces, ordered a deployment of U-boats to the Atlantic in August 1939. U-37 left Wilhelmshaven, with Kapitänleutnant Heinrich Schuch in command, on 19 August 1939, passing north of the British Isles while en-route to the submarine's patrol area off Spain and Portugal rather than via the English Channel. The boat operated for nearly four weeks in the North Atlantic, returning to port on 15 September 1939.

=== Second patrol ===
U-37 left Wilhelmshaven on 5 October 1939 to conduct operations in the North Atlantic now under the command of Korvettenkapitän Werner Hartmann. It was intended that Hartmann would direct a group of German submarines (known as a wolfpack) against allied convoys. Hartmann's wolfpack consisted of six submarines, three Type IX submarines and three smaller Type VIIs, from two different flotillas which had never exercised together. On the way to the patrol area, U-37 sank two merchant ships, the Swedish Vistula on 8 October and the Greek Aris on 12 October. The wolfpack was then ordered to attack the Anglo-French convoy KJF3, inbound from Jamaica, but U-37 was too far away to direct the operation as intended, and was unable to catch the convoy, although U-37 did manage to sink a straggler from the convoy, the French cargo ship Vermont. The group was then ordered to attack Convoy HG 3, sailing from Gibraltar to Liverpool, England. U-37 sank the British cargo steamship Yorkshire from the convoy, with two more ships being sunk by U-45 and U-48. U-37 continued her patrol further south, sinking three ships to the west of the Straits of Gibraltar on 24 October, the British Menin Ridge, Ledbury and Tafna, before being attacked by the British destroyers Keppel and Watchman with depth charges before the submarine managed to escape. On the return journey, U-37 sank the Greek Thrasyvoulos on 26 October. Hartmann returned his boat to port on 8 November after nearly five weeks at sea. U-37 had sunk eight ships during the patrol: four British, two Greek, one French and one Swedish. The attempt to control wolfpacks from submarines at sea had proved a failure, with Hartmann reporting that he had found it impossible to coordinate the operations of other submarines, and future wolfpack operations would be controlled from the shore.

=== Third patrol ===
On 1 January 1940 U-37 was reassigned to the 2nd U-boat Flotilla based at Wilhelmshaven. On 28 January 1940 the U-boat departed for the North Atlantic, with Werner Hartmann still in command. On 4 February 1940, U-37 sank two ships east of Sumburgh Head, Shetland, the Norwegian steamship Hop and the British Leo Dawson. On 8 February the submarine landed two Abwehr agents at Donegal Bay, Ireland, (Note: Dingle Bay according to Blair.) These agents were soon arrested, however. On the way to the assigned patrol area U-37 sank the Norwegian merchant ship Silja on 10 February and the British trawler Togimo on 11 February, before being diverted to the Western end of the English Channel in an unsuccessful attempt to intercept the aircraft carrier Ark Royal. After being released from this attempt, U-37 sank the Danish steamship Aase on 15 February. After reaching the patrol area, U-37 was directed against a convoy detected by German signal intelligence, sinking three ships in two days, the Pyrrhus on 17 February and the Greek Ellin and the French P.L.M. 15 on 18 February, although Pyrrhus and P.L.M. 15 were stragglers from separate convoys, and Ellin was sailing independently. U-37 returned to Wilhelmshaven on 27 February. As on his previous patrol, Hartmann sank eight ships, this time three British, two Norwegian, one Danish, one French and one Greek. Hartmann claimed 43,000 tons of shipping sunk in this patrol, although the actual figure was 24,539 tons.

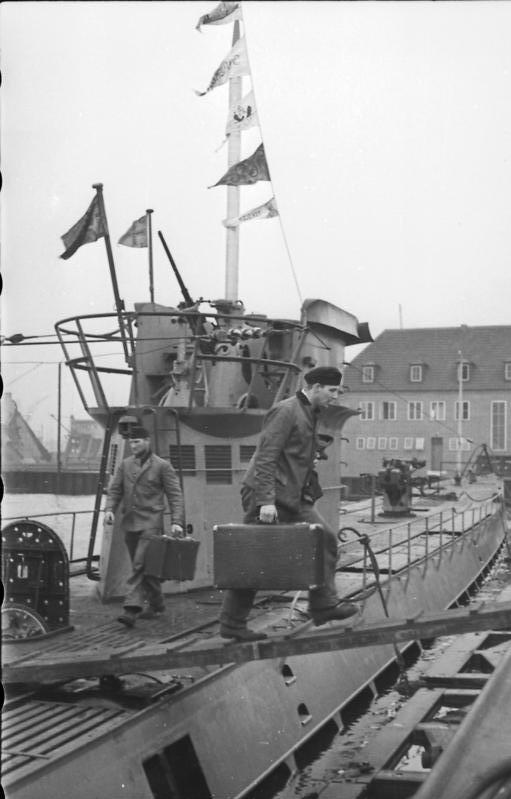
The crew of U-37 departing the submarine after reaching Wilhelmshaven on 18 April 1940

=== Fourth patrol ===
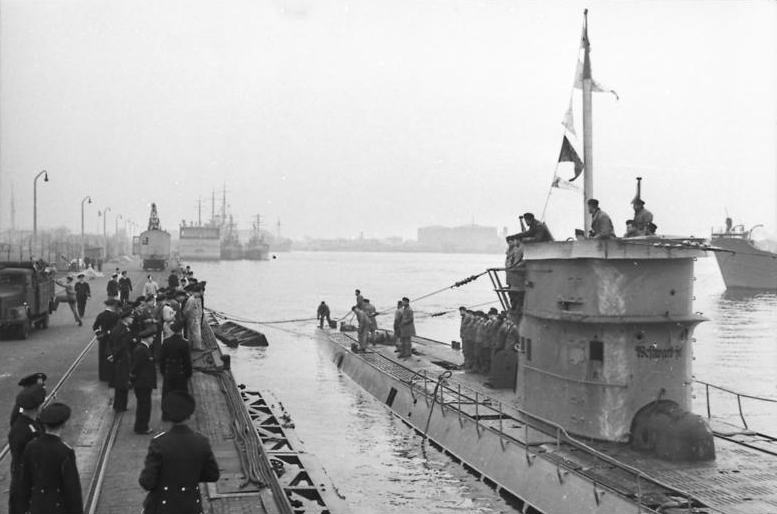
U-37 docking at Wilhelmshaven on 18 April 1940

U-37 departed Wilhelmshaven on 30 March for Hartmann's third consecutive patrol, with the submarine's initial duty being escorting the auxiliary cruiser Atlantis as the raider broke out into the Atlantic. After leaving Atlantis, U-37 reverted to a normal patrol, sinking two ships, the Swedish tanker Sveaborg and the Norwegian Tosca north of the Faroe Islands on 10 April and the British steamship Stancliffe north-east of Unst, Shetland, on 12 April. On 13 April, U-37 attempted to attack a British cruiser, but torpedo defects caused the attack to fail. After patrolling for over two weeks, the U-boat returned to Wilhelmshaven on 18 April.

=== Fifth patrol ===
Hartmann was replaced as commander of U-37 on 6 May 1940 by Kapitänleutnant Victor Oehrn, with Hartmann becoming a staff officer for Admiral Karl Dönitz. U-37 departed from Wilhelmshaven on 15 May for a patrol around Portugal and Spain. On 19 May, U-37 sank the Swedish merchant ship Erik Frisell with gunfire, and on the night of 22/23 May attacked the British Dunster Grange. Several torpedoes were fired at the merchant ship, but torpedo failures meant that none of the torpedoes struck home. U-37 then attacked with her gun, hitting Dunster Grange, but return fire from the British ship caused U-37 to break off the attack. Oehrn reported the torpedo failures by radio, and in response, Dönitz ordered all U-boats to switch from magnetic to impact detonators. The contact detonators were more successful, and U-37 torpedoed and sank the Greek steamship Kyma the next day. On 27 May U-37 torpedoed and sank the steamship Sheaf Mead. Observing that Sheaf Mead was painted gray and was fitted with deck guns, Oehrn concluded that the ship was an auxiliary cruiser or a Q-ship, and made no attempt to assist the survivors of the sinking. This refusal to assist the survivors was later cited by prosecutors at the Nuremberg trials as an example of German brutality. Later that day, U-37 stopped the Argentinean cargo ship Uruguay, sailing from Rosario to Limerick with a cargo of maize. After examining Uruguay's papers, U-37 sank her with scuttling charges. Uruguay's crew of 28 were left in their lifeboats. 15 died, 13 survived. U-37 sank the French cargo liner Brazza and trawler Julien on 28 May, and on 29 May sank the French steamship Marie José and the British tanker Telena. On 1 June U-37 sank the Greek steamship Ioanna and on 3 May the Finnish Snabb. U-37 returned to Wilhelmshaven on 9 June, having used up all her torpedoes. This was the submarine's most successful mission, hitting eleven ships, sinking ten of them. Three French ships were sunk, two Greek, two British, one Swedish, one Argentinian, one Finnish; one British ship was damaged.

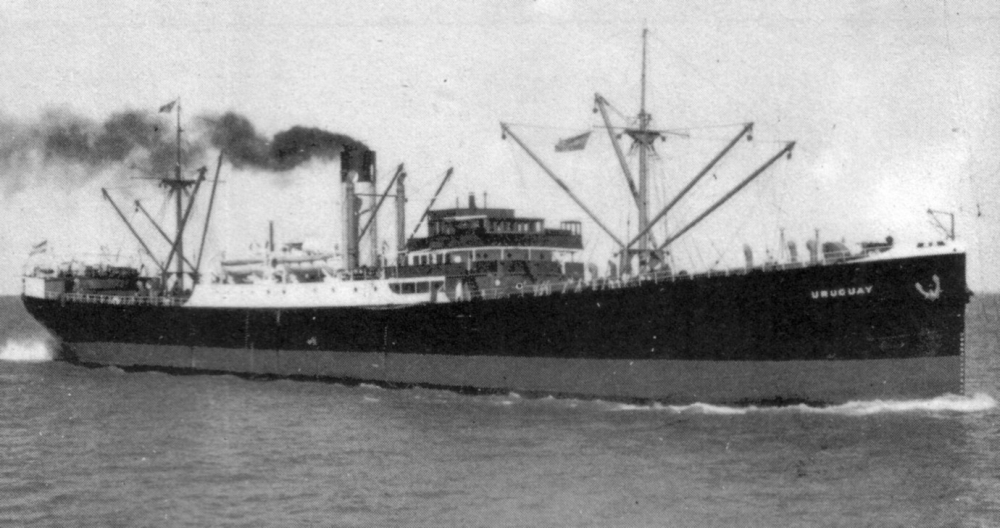
Argentine merchant ship SS Uruguay, sunk by U-37

=== Sixth patrol ===
U-37 sailed from Wilhelmshaven on 1 August 1940, again with Victor Oehrn in command. This week and a half long patrol in the Atlantic off the west coast of Ireland resulted in the sinking of a single British ship, Upwey Grange. U-37 returned to port on 12 August, but rather than head back to Wilhelmshaven, she made for Lorient in France, where the 2nd U-boat Flotilla was now based. (Note: Blair states that the patrol was abandoned early owing to damage sustained in an air attack, but uboat.net says that U-37 was undamaged in the attack, which took place on 2 August.)

=== Seventh patrol ===
For the first time, U-37 began a patrol from a location other than Germany, at Lorient on 17 August, with Oehrn in command once more. The submarine was to focus on operations in the mid-Atlantic. On 23 August, U-37 sank the Norwegian steamship Keret and the British Severn Leigh, and early on 24 sank the British steamship Brookwood. Later that day, U-37 attacked Convoy SC 1, sinking the British sloop HMS Penzance and then Blairmore from the same convoy early on 25 August. Attacks by air and surface escorts forced the patrol to be abandoned early, (Note: Morgan and Taylor claim that despite Oehrn's belief that the damage to U-37 was due to air attack, it was likely due to the detonation of depth charges on the stern of the sinking Penzance.) but this did not stop U-37 from sinking the steamship Yewcrest later on 25 August and the Greek Theodoros T on 27 August. U-37 returned to Lorient on 30 August 1940, having sunk seven ships during this voyage, including Penzance (which Oehrn identified as a destroyer).

=== Eighth patrol ===
On 24 September 1940, U-37 departed Lorient on Oehrn's fourth patrol, in which the submarine would patrol west of the British Isles. On 27 September, U-37 sank the Egyptian Georges Mabro and on 28 September, the submarine encountered SS Corrientes, which had been torpedoed by U-32 on 26 September while part of a westbound convoy, and whose crew had abandoned her, but remained afloat. U-37 sunk the abandoned wreck with a torpedo and shellfire. U-37 was then directed to operate as a weather reporting boat further to the west, where the submarine sank the steamships Samala and Heminge on 30 September. (Note: Heminge was a straggler from Convoy OB 220) On 6 October, U-37 sank the tanker British General, (Note: British General had dispersed from Convoy OA 222.) and on 13 October, when on the return journey to France, sank Stangrant, a straggler from Convoy HX 77 from Halifax to the United Kingdom. The U-boat returned to Lorient on 22 October 1940, having sunk six ships, for a tonnage of 23,200 GRT. These continuing successes resulted in Oehrn being awarded the Knight's Cross of the Iron Cross, before leaving the submarine to take over Hartmann's role as first staff officer for Admiral Dönitz. U-37 had by this time sank 42 1/2 ships for a tonnage of 180,000, which was the most ships sunk by a U-boat at this time and the second highest tonnage total, behind U-48. U-37's chief engineer, Gerd Suhren, was also awarded the Knight's Cross for keeping the submarine operational in the face of multiple faults.

=== Ninth patrol ===
After over a month in port, U-37 departed with a new captain, Oberleutnant zur See Asmus Nicolai Clausen on 28 November 1940, for operations in the South Atlantic, with the submarine to refuel from a German supply ship in the Canary Islands. On 1 December 1940, U-37 sank the steamship Palmella, a straggler from the Gibraltar-bound Convoy OG 46, which had separated from the convoy in heavy weather, west-north-west of Lisbon. On the next day, the submarine attacked the convoy itself, sinking the Swedish Gwalia and the British Jeanne M. On 4 December, U-37 sank the Swedish Daphne, another straggler from OG 46. U-37 then headed southwards towards Morocco and the Canary Islands, but the plans to refuel from a supply ship were unsuccessful owing to the presence of British forces. On 16 December, U-37 sank the Spanish trawler San Carlos off Cape Juby, Morocco. On 19 December 1940, U-37 torpedoed and sank the Vichy French naval oil tanker Rhône and the submarine Sfax, between Cape Juby and Fuerteventura, with Clausen not realising that the ships were Vichy French until after the sinking. On reporting the attack to U-boat command two days later, it was ordered that the involvement of any German or Italian submarine in the sinking be denied, and U-37's logbooks were altered to remove record of the attack, with the submarine's location at the time of the attack being changed to a position 350 mi (560 km) inland. After five weeks on the high seas, U-37 returned to Lorient on 14 January 1941.

=== Tenth and eleventh patrols ===
U-37 left Lorient on 30 January 1941, again bound for southern waters, to patrol off Freetown, Sierra Leone, and to attack convoys being sent to reinforce the British army in Egypt. On 9 February U-37 encountered the lightly escorted Gibraltar–Britain Convoy HG 53 about 150 nmi (280 km; 170 mi) south-west of Cape Vincent. After reporting the convoy to U-Boat High Command, Clausen attacked the convoy, claiming three ships sunk with a tonnage of 13,500 GRT, although U-37 actually sank only two British ships, Courland and Estrellano with a combined tonnage of 3,300 GRT. U-37 was ordered to shadow the convoy, sending out beacon radio signals to direct air attacks and the German heavy cruiser Admiral Hipper against the convoy. Later that day, five Focke-Wulf Fw 200 Condor bomber aircraft attacked the convoy, sinking five merchant vessels, and early on 10 February, U-37 attacked the convoy again, claiming two merchant ships sunk with a tonnage of 7,500 GRT, but in fact sinking only one ship, Brandenburg of 1,473 GRT. U-37 continued to shadow the convoy, in order to guide Admiral Hipper, which sank one straggler from the convoy, Iceland on 11 February. The cruiser then encountered the unescorted Convoy SL64 (which was planned to join up with HG 53) on the night of 11/12 February, sinking seven ships and damaging two more. Having used up all the submarine's torpedoes, U-37 abandoned the trip south, returning to Lorient on 18 February after spending 20 days at sea and sinking 4,781 GRT of shipping.

It was decided that U-37 would be transferred to training duties in the Baltic Sea. Leaving Lorient for the final time on 27 February 1941, U-37's last patrol took her to the waters south of Iceland. On 7 March 1941 U-37 sank the Greek cargo ship Mentor, and was directed against Convoy OB 293 but failed to make contact. On 12 March the submarine sank the Icelandic trawler Pétursey. On 16 March, U-37 was ordered against Convoy HX 112, making contact at about noon and sending out contact signals to home in other submarines. As night fell, U-37 closed to attack the convoy, but was spotted on the surface by a British destroyer (probably HMS Walker), which turned to ram. U-37 crash-dived just ahead of the destroyer, which responded by dropping a pattern of depth charges, badly damaging the submarine, which broke off the attempt to attack the convoy. Later that night, U-37 picked up the last radio message from U-99, commanded by Otto Kretschmer, which had been forced to the surface and forced to scuttle herself, and relayed it to U-Boat Command. After spending 24 days at sea, U-37 entered the port of Kiel on 22 March.

=== Training boat ===
On 1 May 1941 U-37 was reassigned to the 26th U-boat Flotilla, based at Pillau (now Baltiysk, Russia) as a training U-boat. She was transferred to the 22nd U-boat Flotilla, based at Gotenhafen (now Gdynia, Poland) on 1 April 1942, remaining in the training role. On 1 July 1944, U-37 was transferred to the 4th U-boat Flotilla, where she was used as an experimental boat until the end of the war.

She was scuttled on 5 May 1945 off the east coast of Schleswig-Holstein. (Note: Sources differ as to where U-37 was scuttled. Lenton says Eckernförde Bay, uboat.net and Niestle say Hörup Haff (east of Flensburg), and Wynn says Sønderborg Bay.) The submarine's wreck was raised and broken up in 1946.

== Summary of raiding history ==
Date	Name of Ship	Nationality	Tonnage (Note: Merchant ship tonnages are in gross register tons. Military vessels are listed by tons displacement)	Fate
8 October 1939	Vistula	Sweden	1,018	Sunk
12 October 1939	Aris	Greece	4,810	Sunk
15 October 1939	Vermont	France	5,186	Sunk
17 October 1939	Yorkshire	United Kingdom	10,183	Sunk
24 October 1939	Ledbury	United Kingdom	3,528	Sunk
24 October 1939	Menin Ridge	United Kingdom	2,474	Sunk
24 October 1939	Tafna	United Kingdom	4,413	Sunk
30 October 1939	Thrasyvoulos	Greece	3,693	Sunk
4 February 1940	Hop	Norway	1,365	Sunk
4 February 1940	Leo Dawson	United Kingdom	4,330	Sunk
10 February 1940	Silja	Norway	1,259	Sunk
11 February 1940	Togimo	United Kingdom	290	Sunk
15 February 1940	Aase	Denmark	1,206	Sunk
17 February 1940	Pyrrhus	United Kingdom	7,418	Sunk
18 February 1940	Elin	Greece	4,917	Sunk
18 February 1940	P.L.M. 15	France	3,754	Sunk
10 April 1940	Sveaborg	Sweden	9,076	Sunk
10 April 1940	Tosca	Norway	5,128	Sunk
12 April 1940	Stancliffe	United Kingdom	4,511	Sunk
19 May 1940	Erik Frisell	Sweden	5,066	Sunk
22 May 1940	Dunster Grange	United Kingdom	9,494	Damaged
24 May 1940	Kyma	Greece	3,994	Sunk
27 May 1940	Sheaf Mead	United Kingdom	5,008	Sunk
27 May 1940	Uruguay	Argentina	3,425	Sunk
28 May 1940	Brazza	France	10,387	Sunk
28 May 1940	Julien	France	116	Sunk
28 May 1940	Maria Rosé	France	2,477	Sunk
29 May 1940	Telena	United Kingdom	7,406	Sunk
1 June 1940	Ioanna	Greece	950	Sunk
3 June 1940	Snabb	Finland	2,317	Sunk
8 August 1940	Upwey Grange	United Kingdom	9,130	Sunk
22 August 1940	Keret	Norway	1,718	Sunk
23 August 1940	Severn Leigh	United Kingdom	5,242	Sunk
24 August 1940	Brookwood	United Kingdom	5,100	Sunk
24 August 1940	HMS Penzance	Royal Navy	1,025	Sunk
25 August 1940	Blairmore	United Kingdom	4,141	Sunk
25 August 1940	Yewcrest	United Kingdom	3,774	Sunk
27 August 1940	Theodoros T	Greece	3,409	Sunk
27 September 1940	Georges Mabro	Egypt	2,555	Sunk
28 September 1940	Corrientes	United Kingdom	6,863	Sunk
30 September 1940	Heminge	United Kingdom	2,499	Sunk
30 September 1940	Samala	United Kingdom	5,390	Sunk
6 October 1940	British General	United Kingdom	6,989	Sunk
13 October 1940	Stangrant	United Kingdom	5,804	Sunk
1 December 1940	Palmella	United Kingdom	1,578	Sunk
2 December 1940	Gwalia	Sweden	1,258	Sunk
2 December 1940	Jeanne M.	United Kingdom	2,465	Sunk
4 December 1940	Daphne	Sweden	1,513	Sunk
16 December 1940	San Carlos	Spain	223	Sunk
19 December 1940	Rhône	Vichy France	2,785	Sunk
19 December 1940	Sfax	Vichy French Navy	1,379	Sunk
9 February 1941	Courland	United Kingdom	1,325	Sunk
9 February 1941	Estrellano	United Kingdom	1,983	Sunk
10 February 1941	Brandenburg	United Kingdom	1,473	Sunk
7 March 1941	Mentor	Greece	3,050	Sunk
12 March 1941	Petursey	Iceland	91	Sunk

== Bibliography ==
- Blair, Clay (2000). Hitler's U-Boat War: The Hunters 1939–1942. London: Cassell & Co. ISBN 0-304-35260-8.
- Busch, Rainer; Röll, Hans-Joachim (1999). German U-boat commanders of World War II : a biographical dictionary. Translated by Brooks, Geoffrey. London, Annapolis, Md: Greenhill Books, Naval Institute Press. ISBN 1-55750-186-6.
- Gröner, Erich; Jung, Dieter; Maass, Martin (1991). U-boats and Mine Warfare Vessels. German Warships 1815–1945. Vol. 2. Translated by Thomas, Keith; Magowan, Rachel. London: Conway Maritime Press. ISBN 0-85177-593-4.
- Haarr, Geirr H. (2013). The Gathering Storm: The Naval War in Northern Europe September 1939 –April 1940. Barnsley, UK: Seaforth Publishing. ISBN 978-1-84832-140-3.
- Lenton, H. T. (1975). German Warships of the Second World War. London: Macdonald and Jane's. ISBN 0356-04661-3.
- Morgan, Daniel; Taylor, Bruce (2011). U-Boat Attack Logs: A Complete Record of Warship Sinkings from Original Sources 1939–1945. Barnsley, UK: Seaforth Publishing. ISBN 978-1-84832-118-2.
- Niestle, Axel (2014). German U-Boat Losses During World War II: Details of Destruction. Barnsley, UK: Frontline Books. ISBN 978-1-84832-210-3.
- Rohwer, Jürgen; Hümmelchen, Gerhard (1992). Chronology of the War at Sea 1939–1945. London: Greenhill Books. ISBN 1-85367-117-7.
- Rössler, Eberhard (2001) [1975]. The U-Boat: The evolution and technical history of German submarines. London: Cassell & Co. ISBN 0-304-36120-8.
- Wynn, Kenneth (2003) [1997]. U-Boat Operations of the Second World War: Volume 1: Career Histories, U1—U510. London: Caxton Editions. ISBN 1-84067-525-X.
