= German submarine U-42 (1939) =

German World War II submarine

Coordinates: 49°12′N 16°00′W

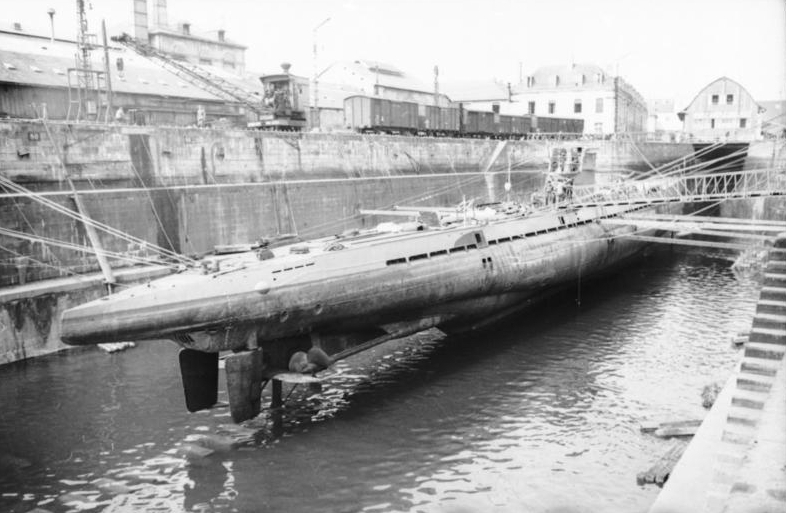
- U-37, (an identical U-boat to U-42) at Lorient in 1940

History

Nazi Germany
- Name: U-42
- Ordered: 21 November 1936
- Builder: DeSchiMAG (AG Weser), Bremen
- Yard number: 947
- Laid down: 21 December 1937
- Launched: 16 February 1939
- Commissioned: 15 July 1939
- Fate: Sunk on 13 October 1939

General characteristics
- Class & type: Type IXA submarine
- Displacement: 1,032 t (1,016 long tons) surfaced; 1,153 t (1,135 long tons) submerged
- Length: 76.50 m (251 ft) o/a; 58.75 m (192 ft 9 in) pressure hull
- Beam: 6.51 m (21 ft 4 in) o/a; 4.40 m (14 ft 5 in) pressure hull
- Height: 9.40 m (30 ft 10 in)
- Draught: 4.70 m (15 ft 5 in)
- Installed power: 4,400 PS (3,200 kW; 4,300 bhp) (diesels); 1,000 PS (740 kW; 990 shp) (electric)
- Propulsion: 2 shafts; 2 × diesel engines; 2 × electric motors
- Speed: 18.2 knots (33.7 km/h; 20.9 mph) surfaced; 7.7 knots (14.3 km/h; 8.9 mph) submerged
- Range: 10,500 nmi (19,400 km; 12,100 mi) at 10 knots (19 km/h; 12 mph) surfaced; 65–78 nmi (120–144 km; 75–90 mi) at 4 knots (7.4 km/h; 4.6 mph) submerged
- Test depth: 230 m (750 ft)
- Complement: 4 officers, 44 enlisted
- Armament: 6 × torpedo tubes (4 bow, 2 stern); 22 × 53.3 cm (21 in) torpedoes; 1 × 10.5 cm (4.1 in) SK C/32 deck gun (180 rounds); 1 × 3.7 cm (1.5 in) SK C/30 AA gun; 1 × twin 2 cm FlaK 30 AA guns

Service record
- Part of: 6th U-boat Flotilla; 15 July – 13 October 1939
- Identification codes: M 05 024
- Commanders: Kptlt. Rolf Dau; 15 July – 13 October 1939
- Operations: 1 patrol: 2 – 13 October 1939
- Victories: 1 merchant ship damaged (4,803 GRT)

German submarine U-42 was a Type IXA U-boat of Nazi Germany's Kriegsmarine that operated during World War II.

U-42 was ordered by Kriegsmarine in November 1936. Her keel was laid down in December 1937; she was launched in February 1939 and commissioned in July 1939.

U-42 had a very short career, being sunk while still on her first war patrol. During her service with Kriegsmarine, the boat conducted only one training patrol and one war patrol. Over the latter she damaged one enemy vessel of 4,803 gross register tons (GRT). Both her patrols were as part of the 6th U-boat Flotilla.

U-42 was sunk southwest of Ireland on 13 October 1939. Out of a crew of 46, 20 survived and 26 went down with the submarine.

== Design ==
As one of the eight original German Type IX submarines, later designated IXA, U-42 had a displacement of 1,032 tonnes (1,016 long tons) when at the surface and 1,153 tonnes (1,135 long tons) while submerged. The U-boat had a total length of 76.50 m (251 ft), a pressure hull length of 58.75 m (192 ft 9 in), a beam of 6.51 m (21 ft 4 in), a height of 9.40 m (30 ft 10 in), and a draught of 4.70 m (15 ft 5 in). The submarine was powered by two MAN M 9 V 40/46 supercharged four-stroke, nine-cylinder diesel engines producing a total of 4,400 metric horsepower (3,240 kW; 4,340 shp) for use while surfaced, two Siemens-Schuckert 2 GU 345/34 double-acting electric motors producing a total of 1,000 metric horsepower (740 kW; 990 shp) for use while submerged. She had two shafts and two 1.92 m (6 ft) propellers. The boat was capable of operating at depths of up to 230 metres (750 ft).

The submarine had a maximum surface speed of 18.2 knots (33.7 km/h; 20.9 mph) and a maximum submerged speed of 7.7 knots (14.3 km/h; 8.9 mph). When submerged, the boat could operate for 65–78 nautical miles (120–144 km; 75–90 mi) at 4 knots (7.4 km/h; 4.6 mph); when surfaced, she could travel 10,500 nautical miles (19,400 km; 12,100 mi) at 10 knots (19 km/h; 12 mph). U-42 was fitted with six 53.3 cm (21 in) torpedo tubes (four fitted at the bow and two at the stern), 22 torpedoes, one 10.5 cm (4.13 in) SK C/32 naval gun, 180 rounds, and a 3.7 cm (1.5 in) SK C/30 as well as a 2 cm (0.79 in) C/30 anti-aircraft gun. The boat had a complement of forty-eight.

== Service history ==
U-42 was ordered by Kriegsmarine on 21 November 1936 (as part of Plan Z). Her keel was laid down on 21 December 1937 by DeSchiMAG (AG Weser) of Bremen as yard number 947. She was launched on 16 February 1939 and commissioned on 15 July of that same year under the command of Kapitänleutnant Rolf Dau.

=== Patrol ===
Following training exercises with the 6th Flotilla from 16 July 1939 to 1 October 1939, U-42 was moved into active service with the 6th Flotilla, ready for operations. The day after her training exercises ended, she left Wilhelmshaven on 2 October. On a 12-day journey, U-42 traveled into the North Sea and circumnavigated the British Isles. She then entered the North Atlantic in search of any Allied convoys. During this operation, one enemy ship was damaged, the 4,803 GRT British steam freighter SS Stonepool, which had become separated from Convoy OB 17 while sailing from Liverpool, England to North America. On 13 Oct U-42 battle surfaced and engaged the ship with her deck gun, hitting her several times before being driven back under by the impressively accurate return fire from the merchantman. This was to be the boat's first and only attack on any Allied merchant vessel.

=== Fate ===
While still on her first war patrol, U-42 was sunk on 13 October 1939 by depth charges from the British destroyers HMS Imogen and HMS Ilex. This attack took place off the southwest coast of neutral Ireland. Of the 46 man crew, 26 were killed in the depth charge attack, 20 crew members survived and were made prisoners of war by the British. The youngest crew member aboard U-42 was Rudolf Nuggel who was born on 22 December 1919 and was among the 26 dead. He was 19 years old with his 20th birthday just over two months away. The captain, Rolf Dau, was the oldest known crew member of U-42. He was born on 1 April 1906 and was 33 years old at the time of the boat's sinking; he survived. U-42 was the fifth U-boat to be lost in World War II.

== Summary of raiding history ==
Date	Ship	Nationality	Tonnage	Fate
13 October 1939	Stonepool	United Kingdom	4,803	Damaged

== Bibliography ==
- Busch, Rainer; Röll, Hans-Joachim (1999). German U-boat commanders of World War II : a biographical dictionary. Translated by Brooks, Geoffrey. London, Annapolis, Md: Greenhill Books, Naval Institute Press. ISBN 1-55750-186-6.
- Busch, Rainer; Röll, Hans-Joachim (1999). Deutsche U-Boot-Verluste von September 1939 bis Mai 1945 [German U-boat losses from September 1939 to May 1945]. Der U-Boot-Krieg (in German). Vol. IV. Hamburg, Berlin, Bonn: Mittler. ISBN 3-8132-0514-2.
- Gröner, Erich; Jung, Dieter; Maass, Martin (1991). U-boats and Mine Warfare Vessels. German Warships 1815–1945. Vol. 2. Translated by Thomas, Keith; Magowan, Rachel. London: Conway Maritime Press. ISBN 0-85177-593-4.
