= HMS Penzance (L28) =

Sloop of the Royal Navy

Coordinates: 56°16′N 27°19′W

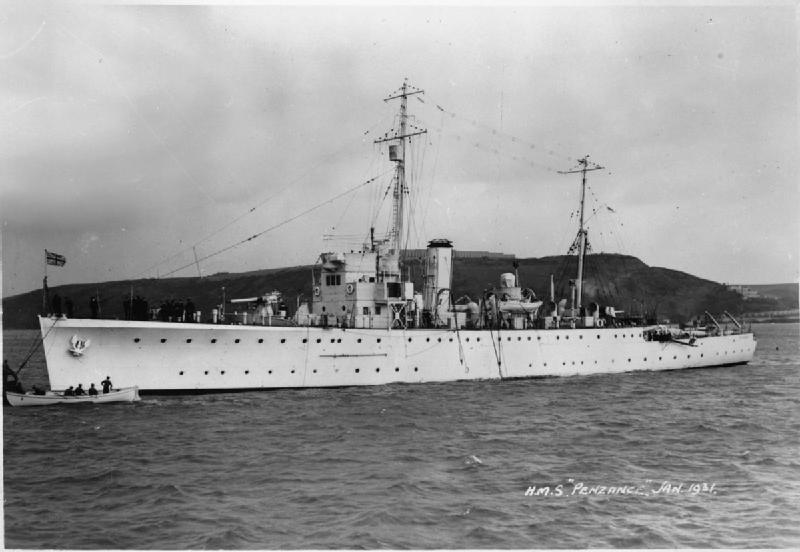
- HMS Penzance

History

United Kingdom
- Name: HMS Penzance
- Ordered: 4 April 1929
- Builder: HM Dockyard, Devonport
- Laid down: 29 July 1929
- Launched: 10 April 1930
- Completed: January 1931
- Commissioned: 15 January 1931
- Identification: L28
- Fate: Torpedoed and sunk, August 1940

General characteristics
- Class & type: Hastings-class sloop
- Displacement: 1,045
- Length: 76.2 m (250 ft 0 in)
- Beam: 10.4 m (34 ft 1 in)
- Draught: 2.4 m (7 ft 10 in)
- Complement: 104

The third HMS Penzance (L28) was a Hastings-class sloop launched in 1930, and torpedoed and sunk in 1940 whilst on convoy protection duty by the German submarine U-37 with the loss of 90 of her 104 crew. She was named after the Cornish port of Penzance and was the third Royal Navy ship to bear that name.

== Construction and design ==
Penzance was one of two Hastings-class sloops ordered on 4 April 1928, following on from two ordered earlier in the year, as part of the 1928 construction programme. The Hastings class was an improved version of the Bridgewater-class, with modified internal arrangements to improve habitability in tropical climates, and had a dual role of patrol service in overseas stations in peacetime and minesweeping during war.

Penzance was 266 feet 4 inches (81.18 m) long overall with a beam of 34 feet 1 inch (10.39 m) and a draught of 11 feet 3 inches (3.43 m) at full load. Displacement was 1,045 long tons (1,062 t) standard and 1,640 long tons (1,670 t) full load. The ship was powered by two Parsons geared steam turbines, each driving one propeller shaft, using steam provided by two Admiralty three-drum boiler. The turbines developed a total of 2,000 shaft horsepower (1,500 kW) and were designed to give a maximum speed of 16.5 knots (30.6 km/h; 19.0 mph).

The main armament consisted of a pair of QF four-inch (102 mm) Mk V guns on the ship's centreline, one forward and one aft, with the forward gun on a high-angle mount, capable of anti-aircraft fire and the second gun on a low-angle mount, for anti-surface use only. The aft 4 inch gun was replaced by a similar gun in a high angle mounting in 1939. Two 3-pounder saluting guns were also carried, while the anti-submarine armament initially consisted of four depth charges. Following the outbreak of war, the ships depth charge outfit was increased to 40.

Penzance was laid down at Devonport dockyard on 29 July 1929, was launched on 10 April 1930 and completed on 15 January 1931.

== Service ==
=== Pre-war service ===
After commissioning, Penzance was deployed to the Persian Gulf, serving there until October 1931, when she moved to the Red Sea. She was refitted at Malta in May 1932, returning to the Red Sea. She was refitted again and recommissioned at Malta in June 1933. In May 1934 Penzance evacuated 300 British and Indian civilians from the Yemeni city of Al Hudaydah to Kamaran Island because of fighting between Saudi and Yemeni forces. When sister ship Hastings ran aground on 11 June 1934, Penzance was employed in the salvage operations, ferrying personnel and equipment to and from the stranded vessel until Hastings was finally refloated on 6 September that year.

Penzance was refitted at Simonstown, South Africa from August 1936 to January 1937 and then joined the Africa Station, based in South Africa. She returned to Britain in May 1938 and after refit at Chatham Dockyard, joined the America and West Indies Station, arriving at Bermuda in June 1939.

=== Second World War ===
On the outbreak of the Second World War in September 1939, Penzance was initially employed on patrol duties, checking for contraband and watching German merchant ships in neutral ports in the region. From March 1940 she escorted convoys running between Bermuda and Halifax, Nova Scotia.

In July 1940 Penzance was ordered home and on 15 August 1940 left Sydney, Nova Scotia as the only armed escort of Convoy SC 1. By 24 August Penzance was 700 miles south–west of Iceland when she was torpedoed by the German submarine U-37. She was hit by a torpedo on the starboard side, split in two, with some of her depth charges exploding, and sank quickly. Losses were heavy, with 89 of her 104 crew killed, and one more later dying of wounds.

== Bibliography ==
- Campbell, N. J. M. (1980). "Great Britain (including Empire Forces)". In Chesneau, Roger (ed.). Conway's All the World's Fighting Ships 1922–1946. Greenwich, UK: Conway Maritime Press. pp. 2–85. ISBN 0-85177-146-7.
- Colledge, J. J.; Warlow, Ben & Bush, Steve (2020). Ships of the Royal Navy: The Complete Record of all Fighting Ships of the Royal Navy from the 15th Century to the Present (5th revised and updated ed.). Barnsley, UK: Seaforth Publishing. ISBN 978-1-5267-9327-0.
- Hague, Arnold (1993). Sloops: A History of the 71 Sloops Built in Britain and Australia for the British, Australian and Indian Navies 1926–1946. Kendal, UK: World Ship Society. ISBN 0-905617-67-3.
- Lenton, H. T. (1998). British & Empire Warships of the Second World War. Annapolis, Maryland: Naval Institute Press. ISBN 1-55750-048-7.
- Rohwer, Jürgen (2005). Chronology of the War at Sea 1939–1945: The Naval History of World War Two (Third Revised ed.). Annapolis, Maryland: Naval Institute Press. ISBN 1-59114-119-2.
