= Wolfpack Prien =

- Active: 12–17 June 1940
- Country: Nazi Germany
- Branch: Kriegsmarine
- Size: 7 submarines

Commanders
- Current commander: Korvettenkapitän Günther Prien

Prien's wolfpack is the name given in some sources to a formation of German U-boats that operated during the Battle of the Atlantic in World War II. It existed from 12 June to 17 June 1940.

The group was named for Kapitänleutnant Günther Prien, commander of U-47.

== Background ==
Prior to the Second World War the German Navy's U-boat Arm, under its leader, Karl Dönitz, developed its pack attack, a response to the convoy system that had defeated its war on commerce during the First World War. However, following the outbreak of hostilities its first attempts to use the tactic had been unsuccessful. Thereafter the UBW stuck to conventional patrols and solo attacks until diverted from the trade offensive to the invasion of Norway.

With the end of the Norwegian campaign in May 1940, the UBW returned to attacking Britain's commerce. A further attempt to make the pack attack viable was made in June 1940 with the dispatch of Rosing's group of five U-boats, against a high-value convoy, US 3, off Cape Finisterre.

== Formation ==
At the beginning of June, a second wave of U-boats was dispatched to operate against Allied shipping. Rohwer, the U-boat historian, lists seven U-boats (U-25, U-28, U-30, U-32, U-38, U-47, and U-51), and states they were set up between 12 and 15 June to operate against convoy HX 47, which had been detected by German Naval Intelligence. He refers to them in this as group "Prien". However Blair (another U-boat historian), describes this second wave, of nine U-boats, as a series of individual patrols; mentioning a group of five set as a U-boat trap for ships evacuating troops from Norway, and describing Rosing's pack in detail, he doesn't refer to a "group Prien" at all. Showell lists the seven U-boats mentioned by Rohwer, but calls them a "wolfpack". The online source U-boat.net follows Showell, but gives the dates of operation as 12 to 17 June. As only two boats made contact with HX 47, and they didn't form a pack to make their assault, the term "wolfpack" is a misnomer (and isn't used by most reliable sources at all).

== Area of operation ==
This group was detailed to attack convoy HX 47 – en route from Halifax to Liverpool. Between 12 and 17 June the U-boats were on passage from the north of Scotland to the Southwest Approaches. On 14 June two boats (U-38 and U-47) made contact with HX 47, south of Ireland in the Atlantic. Attacking separately they sank three ships of the convoy, and another sailing independently. On 13 June U-25 found and sank the armed merchant cruiser Scotstoun in the Northwest Approaches, west of Skye. By 17 June all U-boats were west of the Bay of Biscay.

== Ships hit ==
They sank five ships for a total of 40,494 gross register tons (GRT).

- HMS Scotstoun: U-25 struck the stern of the armed merchant cruiser with one torpedo on 13 June 1940, approximately 80 nautical miles (150 km) west of Barra, Outer Hebrides. A second torpedo hit 10 hours later just aft of the funnel caused the ship to sink by the stern. Seven crew members were killed. The survivors were picked up by HMS Highlander.
- Balmoralwood: At 19.44 hours on 14 June 1940 the Balmoralwood, a straggler from convoy HX 47, was hit amidships by one stern torpedo from U-47 and sank after two hours about 70 nautical miles (130 km) south-southwest of Cape Clear. The master, 39 crew members and one gunner were picked up by Germanic.
- Mount Myrto: At 19.11 hours on 14 June 1940 the Mount Myrto was shelled by 53 rounds from the surfaced U-38. After the shelling, the U-boat dived and struck the ship with a torpedo, but the ship did not sink due to her load of timber. Liebe decided to break off the attack on the damaged vessel because the convoy HX 47 came in sight.
- Erik Boye: On 15 June 1940, in the space of four minutes, U-38 fired torpedoes at and sank both the Italia and Erik Boye of convoy HX 47, about 60 nautical miles (110 km) W of the Scilly Isles. The survivors of Erik Boye were picked up by HMS Fowey.
- Italia: On 15 June 1940, Italia was struck by a torpedo near the engine room, killing nearly all the engine crew. The ship finally sank in 50°41′00″N 08°52′30″W in shallow waters. The survivors were picked up by HMS Fowey.

=== Raiding Summary ===
Date	U-boat	Commander	Name of ship	Tons	Nationality	Convoy
13 June 1940	U-25	Heinz Beduhn	HMS Scotstoun	17,046	Royal Navy	
14 June 1940	U-47	Günther Prien	Balmoralwood	5,834	United Kingdom	HX 47
14 June 1940	U-38	Heinrich Liebe	Mount Myrto	5,403	Greece	
15 June 1940	U-38	Heinrich Liebe	Erik Boye	2,238	Canada	HX 47
15 June 1940	U-38	Heinrich Liebe	Italia	9,973	Norway	HX 47

=== U-Boats ===
U-boat	Commander	From	To
U-25	Heinz Beduhn	12 June 1940	17 June 1940
U-28	Günter Kuhnke	12 June 1940	17 June 1940
U-30	Fritz-Julius Lemp	15 June 1940	17 June 1940
U-32	Hans Jenisch	12 June 1940	17 June 1940
U-38	Heinrich Liebe	12 June 1940	17 June 1940
U-47	Günther Prien	12 June 1940	17 June 1940
U-51	Dietrich Knorr	12 June 1940	17 June 1940

== Bibliography ==
- Blair, Clay (1996) Hitler’s U-Boat War Vol I Cassell ISBN 0-304-35260-8
- Rohwer J, Hümmelchen G (1992) Chronology of the War at Sea 1939–1945 Naval Institute Press ISBN 1-55750-105-X
- JP Mallmann Showell (2002) U-Boat Warfare: The Evolution of the Wolfpack Ian Allan ISBN 0 7110 2887 7
