= Günther Prien =

German U-boat commander during World War II

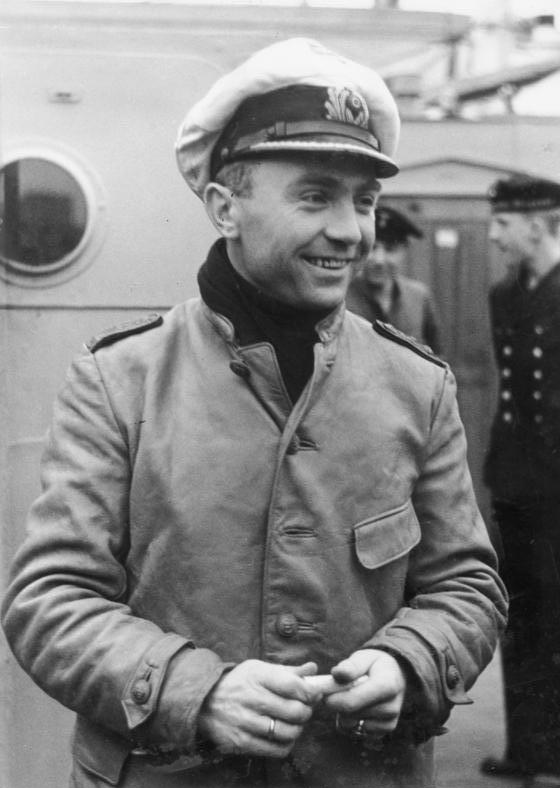
- Born: 16 January 1908; Osterfeld, Province of Saxony, Prussia, German Empire
- Died: 8 March 1941 (aged 33); U-47, Western Approaches, off Ireland
- Military career
- Allegiance: Nazi Germany
- Branch: Kriegsmarine
- Service years: 1933–1941
- Rank: Korvettenkapitän
- Nickname: Der Stier von Scapa Flow
- Service number: NSDAP #1,128,487
- Unit: 7th U-boat Flotilla
- Commands: U-47
- Conflicts: See battles Spanish Civil War World War II: Special Operation P; Operationsbefehl Hartmut; Operation Weserübung; Battle of the Atlantic †
- Awards: Knight's Cross of the Iron Cross with Oak Leaves

Günther Prien (16 January 1908 – presumed 8 March 1941) was a German U-boat commander during World War II. He was the first U-boat commander to receive the Knight's Cross of the Iron Cross and the first member of the Kriegsmarine to receive the Knight's Cross of the Iron Cross with Oak Leaves of Nazi Germany. It was Germany's highest military decoration at the time of its presentation to Prien. (Note: In 1940, the Knight's Cross of the Iron Cross with Oak Leaves was second only to the Grand Cross of the Iron Cross, which was awarded only to senior commanders for winning a major battle or campaign, in the military order of the Third Reich. The Knight's Cross of the Iron Cross with Oak Leaves as highest military order was surpassed on 28 September 1941 by the Knight's Cross of the Iron Cross with Oak Leaves and Swords.)

Under Prien's command, the submarine U-47 was credited with sinking over 30 Allied ships totalling about 200,000 gross register tons (GRT), along with the British battleship HMS Royal Oak at anchor in the Home Fleet's anchorage in Scapa Flow. Prien died when U-47 was lost on 8 March 1941.

== Early life and career ==
Prien was one of three children of a judge and completed his basic education. At the age of five, Prien had been living with relatives, the notary Carl Hahn and his wife, in Lübeck. There he attended the Katharineum, a humanistic secondary school. After his parents separated, Prien moved with his mother and siblings to Leipzig where she eked out a living selling peasant lace. Prien joined the Handelsflotte (German merchant marine) in mid-1923 to ease the financial burden on his family. He applied to and joined the Finkenwerder–Hamburg Seaman's School. After eight years of work and study as a seaman, rising from cabin boy on a sailing ship, Prien passed the required examinations and became the fourth officer on a passenger liner, the SS Hamburg. Prien learned telegraphy, ship handling, leadership, and laws of the sea. In 1931 he became first mate and attended school for a commission. Prien received his sea master's certificate in January 1932.

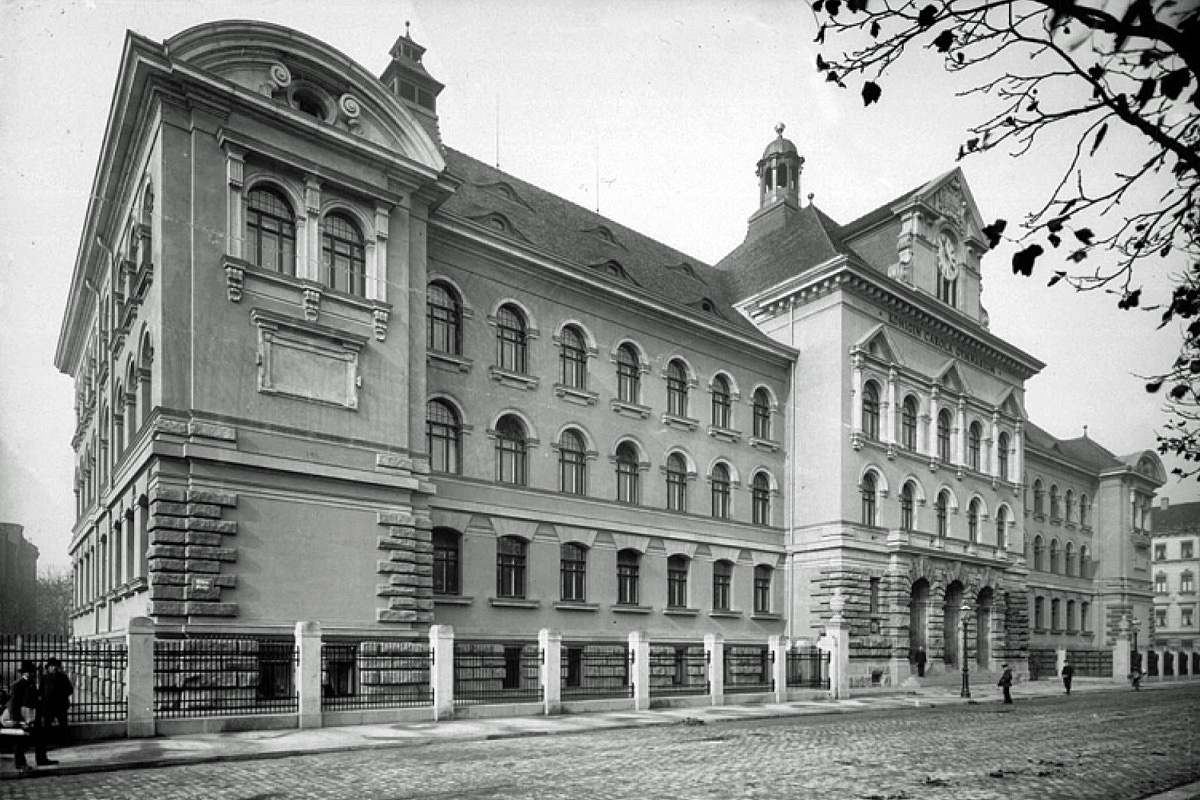
The Königin-Carola-Gymnasium in Leipzig was named the Günther Prien School.

Unable to find work due to the severe contraction of the German shipping industry during the Great Depression, he was forced to turn to the Freiwilliger Arbeitsdienst ('Voluntary Labour Service', FAD). He earned a living dredging fields and digging ditches. Prien joined the Nazi Party in May 1932, but had to resign his membership upon joining the navy prior to Hitler's ascent to power. His membership in the party cemented Prien's image as a Nazi supporter, though his actions have been described as career advancing opportunism rather than genuine political conviction; one author wrote "it is hard to determine his politics." However, Donald Macintyre described Prien as "the most Nazified U-boat captain", "an ardent ruthless Nazi". Prien applied to the Reichsmarine in January 1933 when he found the navy was offering officer-candidate programs for merchant marine officers. He was integrated into the Reichsmarine as a member of "Crew 31" (the incoming class of 1931), but had the age and experience of a 1926 class.

Prien received his military basic training in the 2nd company in the 2nd department of the standing ship division of the Baltic Sea in Stralsund (16 January 1933 – 31 March 1933). (Note: 2nd company—2. Kompanie) (Note: 2nd department—II. Abteilung) (Note: standing ship division—Schiffsstammdivision) During this time he advanced in rank to Fähnrich zur See (naval cadet) on 1 March. He then attended the main cadet course at the Naval Academy Mürwik and various weapons courses for cadets at Kiel (1 April 1933 – 30 September 1934). (Note: main cadet course—Hauptlehrgang für Fähnriche) (Note: weapons course for cadets—Waffenlehrgang für Fähnriche) From 1 October 1934 to 30 September 1935, Prien served as watch and division officer on the light cruiser Königsberg. On this assignment, he was promoted to Oberfähnrich zur See (senior midshipman) on 1 January 1935 and to Leutnant zur See (acting sub-lieutenant) on 1 April 1935. Prien then joined the U-boat training force. Prien attended the U-boat school in Kiel from 1 October 1935 to 30 April 1936. His training included a specialized U-boat torpedo course which was held on U-3.

On 11 May 1936, Prien was appointed first Watch Officer on U-26, serving under the command of Werner Hartmann after forming a bond at the training school. At Hartmann's request Prien was assigned to his submarine, which served in the Spanish Civil War in 1937. Prien rose steadily in rank, from midshipman in 1933 to Oberleutnant zur See (sub-lieutenant) on 1 January 1937. On 1 October 1937, Prien was ordered to the Germaniawerft, the shipbuilding works in Kiel, for construction training of the new Type VIIB U-47. He commissioned U-47 on 17 December 1938 which was part of the Wegener Flotilla. Prien was promoted to Kapitänleutnant (Captain lieutenant) on 1 February 1939.

Prien married Ingeborg in 1939; the couple had two children. Ingeborg Prien later married an Oberstleutnant in the Bundeswehr and changed her name to Inge Sturm-Prien.

== World War II ==
World War II commenced during Prien's first patrol in U-47, following the German invasion of Poland on 1 September 1939. Prien had departed Kiel on 19 August for a patrol lasting 28 days. On 5 September, he sank the British Bosnia of 2,407 gross register tons (GRT), the second ship of the war to be sunk by a U-boat. The prize regulations were in force at the time, so Prien was obliged to stop the ship. After identifying her as British he surfaced alongside her and fired a warning shot from the deck gun. The ship turned away to escape and it took six hits and a fire in her hold full of sulphur to bring it to a stop. Prien asked a passing neutral Norwegian ship to take the crew. The damaged ship was finished with a torpedo. His boat sank two British vessels, Rio Claro of 4,086 GRT on the 6th, and Gartavon of 1,777 GRT on the 7th. The sinkings were notable for Prien's use of the deck gun, which was rare. U-47 returned to Kiel on 15 September having sunk a total tonnage of 8,270 GRT. Prien was recalled by Dönitz to prevent all boats returning simultaneously leaving none on patrol.

=== Second patrol: Scapa Flow ===
On 1 October 1939, Karl Dönitz became a Konteradmiral (rear admiral) and "Commander of the Submarines" (Befehlshaber der Unterseeboote, BdU). Dönitz had been encouraged in operations against warships by the sinking of aircraft carrier Courageous in September 1939. On 28 September 1939 he said, "it is not true Britain possesses the means to eliminate the U-boat menace." Dönitz was busy convincing Hitler of the need for 300 operational boats to achieve decisive success against Britain. Dönitz was attracted to the prospect of attacking the Royal Navy anchorage at Scapa Flow at the outbreak of war, to win a victory for his command. In World War I, two German submarines had tried and failed. Undaunted he ordered German submarine U-16 to reconnoitre the region and requested Luftwaffe reconnaissance. From the air and sea reports Dönitz concluded that there was an 18-yard gap in the northeast entrance, between blockships sunk to bar the gap from Lamb Holm and the mainland. Dönitz selected Prien and U-47 for the task. Prien was his favourite, and according to Dönitz "possessed all the personal qualities and professional abilities required."

Infiltration of Scapa Flow by U-47

Prien left port to navigate the shallow North Sea on 8 October and did not brief his crew until mid-mission. He avoided all shipping and sat on the sea bed in daylight if possible. Prien approached Orkney in the evening of the 14 October. He surfaced four hours sailing time from the anchorage. While surfaced Prien observed the aurora borealis, which exposed the German submarine. In a post-patrol account Prien remarked it was "disgustingly light" and that – in his words – "the whole bay is lit up". At 22:00 the Orkney navigation lights came on for thirty minutes which allowed Prien to fix his position. His watch officers spotted a merchant ship and Prien dived to avoid it, but shadowed the vessel and carried out a practice attack. Despite the presence of the lights he could not see the ship through the periscope. With visibility poor while submerged he decided to carry out the attack on the surface.

Prien pressed on and passed through the narrow entrance to the sound. He selected the wrong channel—between Lamb Holm and Burray—recognising the mistake in time. He disregarded Dönitz's idea to pass south of the two blockships and instead sailed between the centre and northern block ship. The tide allowed the entry to be made rapidly. Prien and his crew were temporarily snared, or ran aground. Only by reversing at maximum revolutions did the U-boat free itself. U-47 entered the Flow at 00:27. Prien and his watch officers found the anchorage to be empty. Eventually they spotted "two battleships", in reality, just one; Royal Oak. The other was the 6,900 GRT seaplane tender Pegasus. Prien began the attack at 00:55 and concluded it at 01:28. He fired seven torpedoes, some of which failed or ran widely off target. Nevertheless, the battleship was struck by several of the second salvo and sank in 13 minutes. The sinking killed 835 of her crew, including Rear Admiral Henry Blagrove, commander of the 2nd Battle Squadron. At 02:15 U-47 exited the Flow and ordered flank speed to escape. He logged in the war diary, "a pity that only one was destroyed." Prien thought he had damaged the Repulse lying behind Royal Oak, but it was not present—the Pegasus was not hit. In the U-boat's war diary at 02:15 he wrote, "I still have five torpedoes for any merchant targets that come our way."

He returned to Germany on 17 October to instant fame. Prien and his crew were flown to Berlin aboard Hitler's personal aircraft. At the Reich Chancellery the following day, Hitler awarded Prien the Knight's Cross of the Iron Cross (Ritterkreuz des Eisernen Kreuzes). For Dönitz, the operation was a personal triumph. U-boat production did not increase immediately, but he had succeeded in securing Hitler's attention. Nazi propaganda exploited the success and gloated over damaged British morale. The Home Fleet did not return to Scapa Flow until March 1940, until the entry points were closed and air defences improved. The fleet was moved to Loch Ewe, but on the way the battleship Nelson was damaged by a mine laid by U-31.

Purportedly Prien did not enjoy being a propaganda tool, but he cooperated with the Reich Ministry of Public Enlightenment and Propaganda, and conferenced with Joseph Goebbels. The conference was unique in that it was the first time the Nazis showcased an individual military success. American journalist William L. Shirer met Prien but was not impressed by his lack of humility and wrote of Prien that he appeared "cocky" and a "fanatical Nazi." The story that Prien had simply followed a ship into the harbour was rightly disbelieved; Prien said nothing of his route in. Prien wrote a book of his experiences during the war, Mein Weg Nach Scapa Flow (My way to Scapa Flow), released in the autumn, 1940. One historian wrote, "for a story of potentially high propaganda value, it is told with striking restraint." The media compensated for this apparent modesty. The Illustrierter Beobachter lionised Prien. It provided plenty of images of Prien, his crew and Hitler, exalting him as a hero. These sentiments were picked up and spread throughout Germany by other state-controlled media outlets.

Prien received the nickname Der Stier von Scapa Flow ("The Bull of Scapa Flow"); the emblem of a snorting bull was painted on the conning tower of U-47 and soon became the emblem of the entire 7th U-boat Flotilla. The reason, given by 1st watch officer Engelbert Endrass for this, was the sight of Prien's demeanour as U-47 entered Scapa Flow, "his frowning face and hunched shoulders reminded him of a bull in a ring." All U-boats had their number removed from the conning tower in wartime, and commanding officers often applied their own motifs. Two members of the Scapa Flow crew earned the Knight's Cross of the Iron Cross during World War II: the chief engineer (Leitender Ingenieur) Johann-Friedrich Wessels and 1st watch officer (I. Wachoffizier) Engelbert Endrass.

Kept secret by the German naval command was that Prien had fired a total of seven G7e torpedoes at his target; only one from the first salvo hit the target and exploded on the bow, near the anchor chain. The stern torpedo also failed to hit or detonate. The second salvo did strike and explode. The navy had long-standing problems with their depth, steering and their magnetic detonator systems. These problems continued to bedevil the German submariners for a long time. In 2002, part of a torpedo fired during the attack resurfaced near to an anchored tanker. The warhead had detached but the missile contained compressed air necessitating its destruction by a bomb disposal team.

The historian Riederer argues that Sonderunternehmen P (Special Operation P), the codename for the attack on Scapa Flow, was very likely predominantly motivated by Nazi propaganda. Following World War I, the German High Seas Fleet was interned at Scapa Flow under the terms of the Armistice whilst negotiations took place over the fate of the ships. Fearing that all the ships would be seized and divided amongst the Allies, Admiral Ludwig von Reuter decided to scuttle the fleet. Whilst the internment was considered a national humiliation by the Kriegsmarine, the scuttling of the fleet was romanticised as an act ridding the navy of the shame associated with the Kiel mutiny of 3 November 1918. The NS-propaganda spread the interpretation that Prien's success at Scapa Flow turned the symbolic triumph of scuttling the fleet, and had finally rid the older generation from the Scapa Flow traumata.

=== Third patrol ===
U-47 under the command of Prien with 1st watch officer (I. WO) Oberleutnant zur See Engelbert Endrass and chief engineer Oberleutnant (Ing.) Johann-Friedrich Wessels left Kiel on 16 November 1939. U-47 attacked a British cruiser on 28 November 1939. Prien had identified the ship to be a London-class cruiser. Prien intended to launch a spread of three torpedoes, but only a single torpedo cleared the tube and detonated in the wake of the cruiser. When the periscope cleared the surface, Prien observed what he believed major damage to the stern of the cruiser, her starboard torpedo launchers dislodged and an aircraft tilted. U-47 surfaced and tried to pursue the cruiser but was driven off by depth charges dropped from the escort. It turned out the cruiser was HMS Norfolk which was not damaged by the detonation. The war diary of the Befehlshaber der U-Boote (BdU) on 17 December 1939 stated that even though a hit was observed the cruiser was not sunk, but German propaganda broadcast that "The bull of Scapa Flow" had sunk the cruiser. Upon inquiry from the Admiralty, Norfolk reported herself undamaged; she thought the explosion in her wake had been an aircraft bomb.

On 5 December 1939, U-47 spotted nine merchant vessels escorted by five destroyers. At 14:40, Prien fired one torpedo. U-47 continued to attack Allied shipping in the Western Approaches, however eight out of twelve G7e U-47 carried, failed to detonate either missing or malfunctioning. On 18 December 1939, U-47 returned to Kiel via the Kaiser Wilhelm Canal. The claims made by Prien are noted in the war diary of the BdU on 17 December 1939:

1. steamer of unknown origin 12,000 GRT
2. Norwegian tanker 10,000 GRT
3. Dutch tanker 9,000 GRT

for a total of 31,000 GRT plus one British warship damaged, while the actual tonnage was only 23,168 GRT. Three ships were confirmed sunk. The identity of the vessels were SS Navasota from OB 46 south of Fastnet was the first, tanker MV Britta south of Longships Lighthouse, and finally Tanjandoen south-southeast of The Lizard. From convoy OB 46, 37 sailors died aboard SS Navasota, another 45 were rescued by other merchant vessels Escapade and Clan Farquhar. Louis Scheid rescued 62 men from Tanjandoen, but six perished. Britta lost six men, a Belgian ship rescued 25.

=== Fourth patrol ===
Prien's fourth patrol started on 29 February 1940 from Kiel. The former 1st watch officer Endrass had been replaced by Oberleutnant zur See Hans-Werner Kraus. On this patrol, U-47 headed for the North Sea, the Shetland Islands and the Orkney Islands. On 1 March, U-47 arrived in Heligoland for a four-day stop. Back at sea again on 11 March, U-47 sank the Britta on 25 March. U-47 returned to Wilhelmshaven again on 29 March, ending this patrol. The ship was torpedoed without warning northwest of Sule Skerry. 13 men died and five were rescued by the Danish ship Nancy.

Torpedo failures still afflicted the U-boat fleet but the number of sinkings rose in the first months of 1940. U-boat commanders, determined to enter the ranks of "aces" such as Prien, were prepared to take greater risks, most often attacking at night on the surface—the Admiralty noted that by February 1940 these reached 58 percent.

=== Fifth patrol: Weserübung ===
In April 1940 the OKM planned Operationsbefehl Hartmut to support Operation Weserübung, the invasions of Denmark and Norway. The purpose was to provide seaborne protection for the German amphibious landings on Norway's large coast line from the Royal Navy and French Navy. The German surface fleet could not fight a large-scale surface action against the British and win. Dönitz hoped the U-boats could compensate for this weakness. The faulty G7e torpedo rendered the German submarine fleet useless for the duration of Weserübung. The failure of torpedoes was a factor in the German naval defeat in the Battles of Narvik.

Prien formed part of a group patrolling east of the Shetland Islands, Vagsfjord and Trondheim. U-47 left Wilhelmhaven on its fifth patrol on 3 April, which ended on 26 April in Kiel. Prien's 1st watch officer was again Oberleutnant zur See Kraus. The boat formed part of a 28-strong fleet, practically the entire operational force, committed to waters off the Norwegian and British coast. The German operation attracted an immediate counterattack by the Royal Navy, intense battles were fought at Narvik. The BdU's opposition, the Royal Navy Submarine Service, achieved some success: the Karlsruhe was crippled and scuttled off Kristiansand.

Prien succeeded in penetrating an Allied-held anchorage again at Vagsfjord fjord. Prien counted three large and three small transport ships, two cruisers, all slightly overlapping—he described it as a "wall of ships". Prien fired eight torpedoes, but none hit. The first four were fired at two of the large transports and two cruisers under the cover of darkness from ranges of 750–1,500 metres. Unable to explain the failure, Prien surfaced after no discernible action was taken by the British. He went over the torpedoes and firing control data personally before another four-missile salvo was fired. The same result was observed. The torpedoes either missed, failed to detonate or struck rocks after running off course. While on manoeuvres to fire his stern torpedo on the surface, he ran aground damaging his starboard diesel engine as he attempted to break free. He could not wait for high tide to assist while within range of British guns, and daybreak, he noted, was only hours away. His crew eventually rocked the U-boat loose and U-47 escaped.

On the way home Prien intercepted the battleship Warspite on 19 April. He stalked her and fired two torpedoes with the same result—one exploded at the end of its run, alerting the escorts which counterattacked with depth charges. A convoy was sighted later, but Prien did not bother attacking; he had lost faith in his main weapons. Prien angrily signalled Dönitz to tell him they had been sent into battle with "wooden rifles." A full report was made by Prien: "we found ourselves equipped with a torpedo which refused to function in northern waters either with contact or magnetic pistols. To all intents and purposes, the U-boats were without a weapon." The report was crushing to Dönitz.

The commander-in-chief of U-boats conceded of the U-boat operation, "I doubt whether men have ever had to rely on such a useless weapon." In no fewer than 40 attacks on Allied warships, not a single sinking was achieved. Dönitz appealed to Erich Raeder, and he was forced to agree on the hopeless situation. He ordered all but three submarines to port. The remaining trio were ordered to continue reconnaissance patrols.

=== Sixth patrol ===
On his sixth war patrol (3 June – 6 July 1940), Prien intercepted Convoy HX 47, part of the HX convoys. This patrol, again Kraus served as 1st watch officer, started and ended in Kiel and targeted the shipping routes in the North Atlantic and the Bay of Biscay west of the English Channel.

Prien was a Wolfpack leader and made the tactical decisions for this patrol line. Wolfpack Prien planned to attack HX 47, 400 nautical miles (740 kilometres; 460 miles) west of Lorient prior to its rendezvous with its home–home bound escort. He sank the 5,834 GRT ship Balmoralwood. The merchant had fallen behind. The ship carried 8,730 tons of wheat and four aircraft.

The 13,056 GRT San Fernando from HX 49 was sunk on 21 June. The ship carried 13,500 tons of crude oil and 4,200 tons of fuel oil; all the crew appear to have survived the sinking. The patrol yielded another six ships sunk. The most notable victim was the passenger liner Arandora Star, sunk west of the Aran Islands. The 14-year old ship sank with heavy loss of life. It was transporting hundreds of German and Italian internees to Canada. Of the approximately 1,300 people, 200 guards, and 174 crew on board, 805 died. The BdU credited Prien with ten ships sunk totalling 66,587 GRT. This made Prien's sixth war patrol the most successful U-boat operation to date.

=== Seventh patrol ===
U-47 remained in Kiel until 27 August 1940 when it sortied again. The 1st watch officer on Prien's seventh patrol was again Kraus. Upon the conclusion of the patrol, which had taken U-47 into the North Atlantic west of the Hebrides, Prien was ordered to the U-boat base at Lorient, in occupied France where it arrived on 26 September 1940. The Battle of France and the occupation of the Atlantic coast afforded the BdU bases. They allowed German submarines to strike deeper into the Atlantic and spend much longer on patrol.

Prien accounted for the destruction of six ships plus a further vessel damaged. His largest victim was Titan, over 9,000 GRT from convoy OA 207. Prien lost one man overboard during the patrol. 89 men survived and six were killed. His greatest success was against the large Convoy SC 2. He attacked and claimed four ships sunk after U-65 led him to the scene. The attacks were carried out on the surface in dark Atlantic night during poor weather. U-28 sank another ship, but Otto Kretschmer in U-99 failed. Dönitz was disappointed, it was not the annihilation battle he hoped for. Dönitz ordered Prien to act as a weather-boat at a point 23° west, mainly for Luftwaffe air fleets engaged in the Battle of Britain.

The signals from the 53-strong convoy were decoded on 30 August which gave the time, position and arrival times enabling the BdU to order Prien and a Wolfpack into action. Prien had known where to search. Dönitz and the BdU were reading Admiralty codes and this information had been passed to Prien. The information led to the sinking of Ville de Mons in ten minutes. All but one of the crew were saved. The captain reported the sighting of three U-boats, two of which approached him and asked for his ship's identity. They were eventually rescued by an Allied merchant ship. The U-boats were forced to abandon the attack when a Short Sunderland appeared and they lost contact with the convoy.

Prien formed part of a Wolfpack that attacked Convoy HX 72. While searching for the previous convoy they ran into HX 72. While the operation was a German success, Prien damaged only one ship with his only remaining torpedo. Six ships were sunk by other U-boats. The Germans waited for the sole escort, Jervis Bay to turn away. Prien maintained contact to guide U-29, U-43, U-46, U-48 and U-65 into attack. 12 ships were sunk from the convoy amounting to 77,863 GRT. On the patrol Prien sank 35,005 GRT of shipping, with another 5,156 damaged. On 21 September U-48 relieved Prien on shadowing duties.

=== Eighth patrol: Oak Leaves ===
Prien took U-47 on its eighth war patrol on 14 October 1940, the last with Kraus as 1st watch officer, patrolling the sea routes in the North Atlantic, from the North Channel to Rockall. A five-strong U-boat pack that were too far away to tackle Convoy SC 7 was called into assist. Prien, who was trying to reach SC 7, formed a wolfpack with U-28, U-38, U-48 and U-100. Convoy HX 79 was spotted by U-47 in the morning of the 19 October, just as its 10-ship anti-submarine escort arrived. Only U-28 failed to get into an attack position by evening. On 20 October 1940, Prien attacked Convoy HX 79 and sank the transports La Estancia, Bilderdijk and Wandby. Shirak is also believed to have been sunk by Prien and his crew in the battle. When added to Prien's hits, the Focke-Wulf Fw 200s of I. Gruppe of Kampfgeschwader 40 increased the tally to 12 ships sunk.

While at sea, Prien received the message on 21 October that he had been awarded the Knight's Cross of the Iron Cross with Oak Leaves (Ritterkreuz des Eisernen Kreuzes mit Eichenlaub) the day before. He was the fifth member of the Wehrmacht and first of the Kriegsmarine to be so honored. U-47 returned to Lorient on 23 October.

Heinz Rühmann, Hans Brausewetter and Josef Sieber sang a persiflage of the 1939 song "Das kann doch einen Seemann nicht erschüttern" ("That won't shake a sailor"), written by Michael Jary from the film Paradies der Junggesellen—Bachelor's Paradise, on occasion of the Oak Leaves presentation to Prien. The reworded lyrics are "Das muss den ersten Seelord doch erschüttern" ("That must shake the First Sea Lord", alluding to Winston Churchill). (Note: First Sea Lord at the time was Admiral Dudley Pound; the office is usually held by a naval officer. Churchill had been First Lord of the Admiralty (a different office usually held by a Member of Parliament) in 1911–1915 and from the outbreak of the war until he became Prime Minister in May 1940.) The lyrics also refer to Neville Chamberlain and mock the song Rule, Britannia! by adapting an English phrase into German: "die Waves zu rulen ist jetzt schluß" ("the rule of the waves is over").

=== Ninth patrol ===
The ninth war patrol began on 3 November 1940 from Lorient and took U-47 to the North Atlantic, west of the North Channel. After 34 days at sea, U-47 returned to Lorient on 6 December. On this patrol, Prien damaged the Gonçalo Velho on 8 November, and sank the Ville d'Arlon and damaged Conch on 2 December 1940. The tanker survived Prien's attack, then withstood a three torpedo salvo from U-95. The ship finally sank after a single torpedo from Otto Kretschmer's U-99.

=== Tenth patrol and death ===
On 20 February 1941, U-47 departed from Lorient on its tenth and final war patrol. Prien located well south of the main wolfpack concentrations. He intercepted and repeatedly attacked convoy OB 290. The solitary attacks sank two ships. Prien continued to pursue the convoy but did not succeed again. West of Ireland, Fw 200s sank seven ships from this convoy making it the most successful intervention of German aircraft in the Atlantic. The success of the Fw 200s, well out to sea, depredations of U-boat concentrations between Iceland and Britain simultaneously with Operation Berlin, in which battleships Scharnhorst and Gneisenau cruised the convoy lanes was an anxious and operationally complex period for the German Admiralty.

U-47 went missing after intercepting Convoy OB 293 on 7 March. His attack prompted a five-hour chase from 00:23 on 8 March. At 05:19 Prien was caught on the surface and dived but could not escape the rapid depth charge attack from the escorts. U-47 has generally been thought to have been sunk by the British destroyer HMS Wolverine west of Ireland; the submarine was attacked by Wolverine and HMS Verity, which took turns covering each other's ASDIC blind spots and dropping patterns of depth charges until U-47 rose almost to the surface before sinking and then exploded with an orange flash visible from the surface. Other British reports of the action mention a large red glow appearing deep below the surface amid the depth charge explosions.

To date, there is no official record of what happened to U-47 or her 45 crewmen, though a variety of possibilities exists, including mines, a mechanical failure, falling victim to her own torpedoes, and possibly a later attack that did not confirm any kills by the corvette team of HMS Camellia and HMS Arbutus. Posthumously on 18 March, Prien was promoted to Korvettenkapitän (corvette captain/lieutenant commander), effective as of 1 March 1941.

Prien's death was kept secret until 23 May. Churchill had personally announced it to the House of Commons, and propaganda broadcasts to Germany had repeatedly taunted listeners with the question "Where is Prien?" until Germany was forced to acknowledge his loss. The announcement was made in the Wehrmachtbericht on 24 May 1941 stating: "The U-boat under the command of Korvettenkapitän Günter Prien did not return from his last patrol against the enemy. The loss of the boat has to be assumed." The importance of Prien was known to the Reich Ministry of Public Enlightenment and Propaganda. To offset the negative impact his death might have on the German population, the message was hidden among the information about the tonnage sunk by U-boats.

According to one biographer, in contrast with Kretschmer, Prien was purportedly a strict disciplinarian who rarely allowed humanity to compromise or interfere with the running of his boat. His crew despised him for it. He harboured much bitterness because of his difficult beginning. He could be genial among fellow officers but his reputation among subordinates was low.

== In popular culture ==
=== Nazi-Propaganda ===
Prien’s autobiography, Mein Weg nach Scapa Flow ("My Path to Scapa Flow"), was published in 1940. The book became a bestseller in Nazi-Germany, with a print run of approximately 890,000 copies. In it, Prien is portrayed as a committed National Socialist and an ardent admirer of Adolf Hitler. Although historians point out that a ghostwriter was likely involved, Prien publicly endorsed the work, and in 1941,posthumously Prien was awarded the Nazi youth book prize, "Hans Schemm Prize".

As was the case with many recipients of the Knight's Cross, promotional postcards featuring Prien were produced. These were also intended to inspire enthusiasm for the war among young people and to recruit as many new personnel as possible for the various branches of the Wehrmacht.

The 1958 war film U 47 – Kapitänleutnant Prien, directed by Harald Reinl, was loosely based on Prien's combat record and command of U-47. Prien was portrayed by the German actor Dieter Eppler. Prien was portrayed by Werner Klemperer in the 1957 US TV series The Silent Service in the episode, "The U-47 in Scapa Flow".

Thomas Riederer, in collaboration with the German historian Roman Töppel, argues that Priens's portrayal as a war hero followed military tradition. However, Prien had to be portrayed as a victim of war and that he had distanced himself from the Nazi regime. The late 1950s reception of the film U 47 – Kapitänleutnant Prien showed that this skewed portrayal was no longer accepted by the general audience in West Germany at the time.

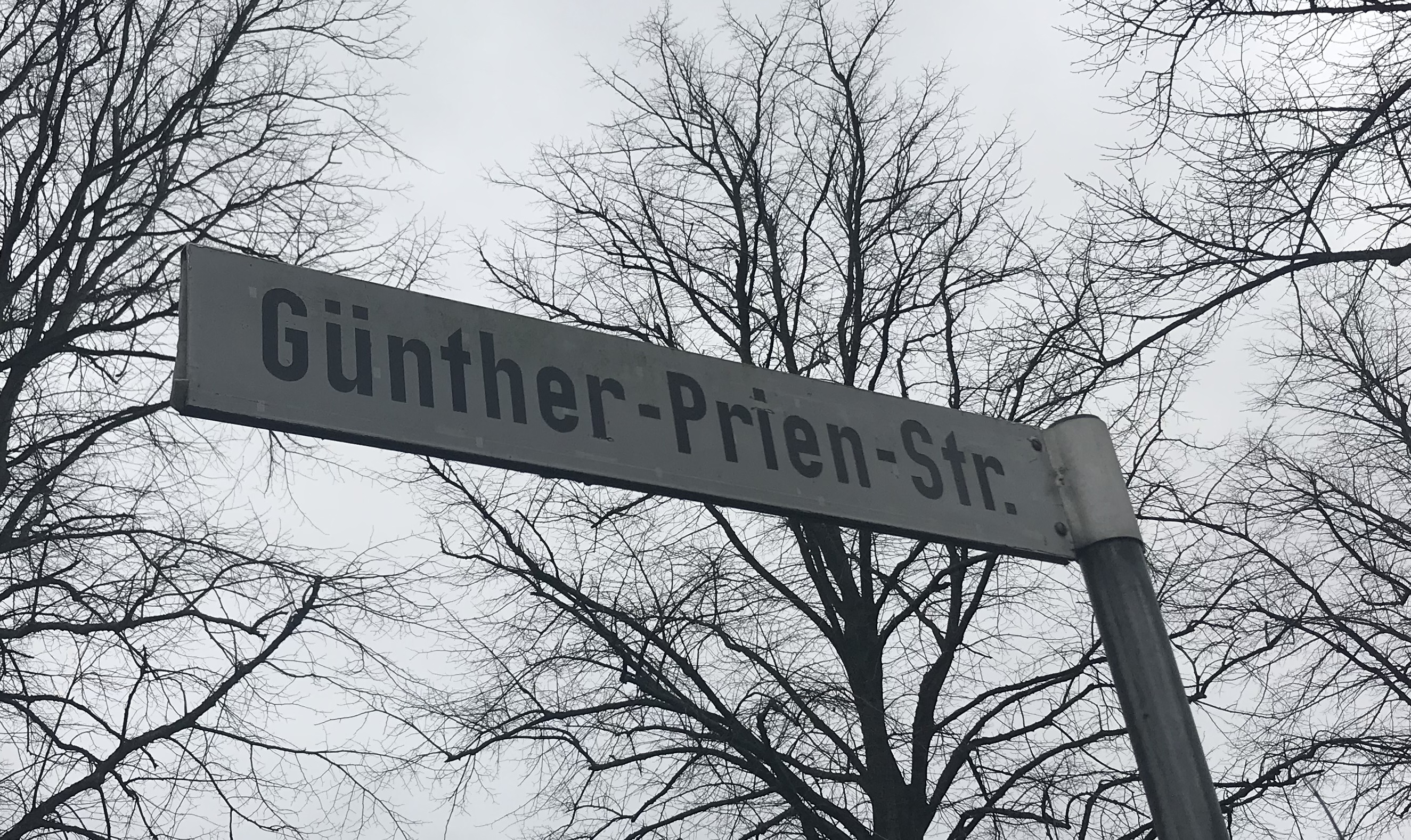
Road sign in Schönberg, Plön

Prien was a subject of a hagiographic 1981 account by German author Franz Kurowski, Günther Prien, der Wolf und sein Admiral (Günther Prien, the Wolf and his Admiral). The German scholar Hans Wagener classifies Kurowski's book, published by extreme right-wing publisher Druffel Verlag, as an "almost perfect example of a skillful distillation of the Nazi understanding of the Second World War". The Canadian historian Michael Hadley commented on the narrative's goals as follows:

Here he [Kurowski] wished to commemorate the "meritorious soldier and human being Günther Prien [who is] forgotten neither by the old submariners nor" —and this would have startled most observers in Germany today [in 1995] —"by the young submariners of the Federal German Navy".

== Commemoration ==
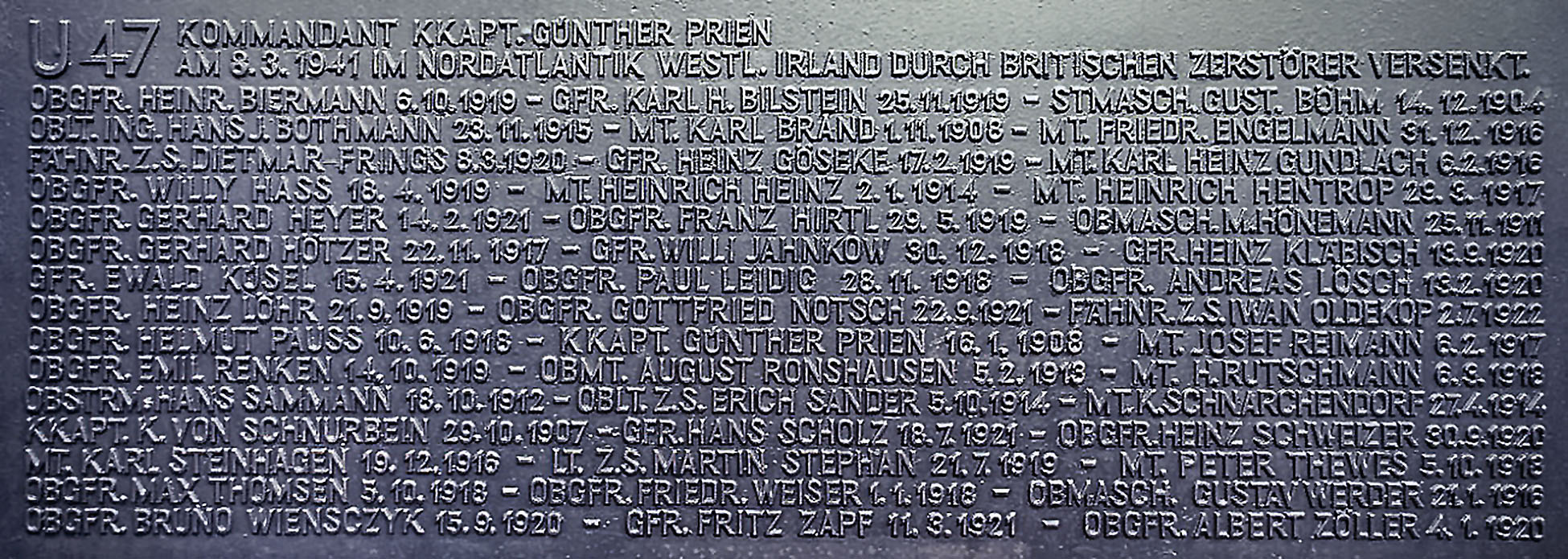
The plaque commemorating Prien and the crew of U-47 at the Möltenort U-Boat Memorial

The West German navy, at the time named the Bundesmarine (Federal Navy), had considered Prien as namesake for the 1967 commissioned guided missile destroyer Lütjens. However the legend surrounding Prien, that he had distanced himself from Nazism and had become an active member of the German resistance and was held captive at the Wehrmachtgefängnis Torgau (Torgau Wehrmacht Prison), turned out to be false. Consequently, the name Lütjens, named after Admiral Günther Lütjens, was chosen instead.

The street "Günther-Prien-Straße" in Schönberg, Plön, is named after him.

== Summary of career ==
According to Busch and Röll, Prien sailed on ten war patrols and sank 30 commercial ships of 162,769 GRT, one warship with a displacement of 29,970 long tons (30,450 t), and damaged eight commercial ships for 62,751 GRT and one warship of 10,035 long tons (10,196 t). According to Blair, the one warship of 10,035 long tons, the heavy cruiser Norfolk was not damaged.

=== Awards ===
- Wehrmacht Long Service Award 4th Class (22 January 1937)
- Iron Cross (1939)
  - 2nd Class (25 September 1939)
  - 1st Class (17 October 1939)
- U-boat War Badge with Diamonds
- Diamond-studded Navy Honour Dagger
- Knight's Cross of the Iron Cross with Oak Leaves
  - Knight's Cross on 18 October 1939 as Kapitänleutnant and commander of U-47
  - 5th Oak Leaves on 20 October 1940 as Kapitänleutnant and commander of U-47

=== Dates of rank ===
1 March 1933:	Fähnrich zur See (naval cadet)
1 January 1935:	Oberfähnrich zur See (senior midshipman)
1 April 1935:	Leutnant zur See (acting sub-lieutenant)
1 January 1937:	Oberleutnant zur See (sub-lieutenant)
1 February 1939:	Kapitänleutnant (captain lieutenant/lieutenant)
18 March 1941:	Korvettenkapitän (corvette captain/lieutenant commander), effective as of 1 March 1941
