= German submarine U-38 (1938) =

German World War II submarine

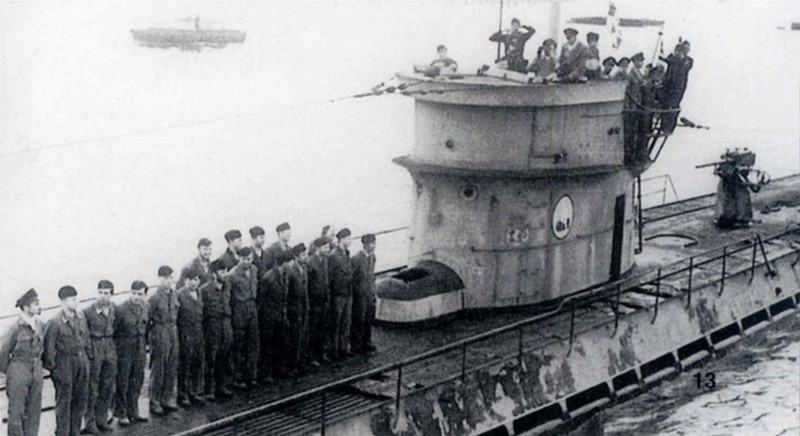
- U-38 and its crew

History

Nazi Germany
- Name: U-38
- Ordered: 29 July 1936
- Builder: DeSchiMAG AG Weser, Bremen
- Yard number: 943
- Laid down: 15 April 1937
- Launched: 9 August 1938
- Commissioned: 24 October 1938
- Fate: Scuttled 5 May 1945 west of Wesermünde and broken up in 1948.

General characteristics
- Class & type: Type IXA submarine
- Displacement: 1,032 t (1,016 long tons) surfaced; 1,153 t (1,135 long tons) submerged
- Length: 76.50 m (251 ft) o/a; 58.75 m (192 ft 9 in) pressure hull
- Beam: 6.51 m (21 ft 4 in) o/a; 4.40 m (14 ft 5 in) pressure hull
- Height: 9.40 m (30 ft 10 in)
- Draught: 4.70 m (15 ft 5 in)
- Installed power: 4,400 PS (3,200 kW; 4,300 bhp) (diesels); 1,000 PS (740 kW; 990 shp) (electric)
- Propulsion: 2 shafts; 2 × diesel engines; 2 × electric motors
- Speed: 18.2 knots (33.7 km/h; 20.9 mph) surfaced; 7.7 knots (14.3 km/h; 8.9 mph) submerged
- Range: 10,500 nmi (19,400 km; 12,100 mi) at 10 knots (19 km/h; 12 mph) surfaced; 65–78 nmi (120–144 km; 75–90 mi) at 4 knots (7.4 km/h; 4.6 mph) submerged
- Test depth: 230 m (750 ft)
- Complement: 4 officers, 44 enlisted
- Armament: 6 × torpedo tubes (4 bow, 2 stern); 22 × 53.3 cm (21 in) torpedoes; 1 × 10.5 cm SK C/32 naval gun (180 rounds); 1 × 3.7 cm (1.5 in) SK C/30 AA gun; 1 × twin 2 cm FlaK 30 AA guns

Service record
- Part of: 6th U-boat Flotilla; 24 October 1938 – 31 December 1939; 2nd U-boat Flotilla; 1 January 1940 – 30 November 1941; 24th U-boat Flotilla; 1 December 1941 – 31 March 1942; 21st U-boat Flotilla; 1 April 1942 – 30 November 1943; 4th U-boat Flotilla; 1 December 1943 – 28 February 1945; 5th U-boat Flotilla; 1 March – 5 May 1945
- Identification codes: M 20 675
- Commanders: Kptlt. Heinrich Liebe; 24 October 1938 – 22 July 1941; K.Kapt. Heinrich Schuch; 15 July 1941 – 6 January 1942; Oblt.z.S. Ludo Kregelin; 1943; Oblt.z.S. Helmut Laubert; 5 January – 22 August 1943; Oblt.z.S. Paul Sander; 23 August – 14 December 1943; Oblt.z.S. Goske von Möllendorff; 16 December – December 1943; Oblt.z.S. Herbert Kühn; January – 14 April 1944; K.Kapt. Georg Peters; 15 April 1944 – 5 May 1945
- Operations: 11 patrols: 1st patrol: 19 August – 18 September 1939; 2nd patrol: 14 November – 16 December 1939; 3rd patrol: 26 February – 5 April 1940; 4th patrol: 8 – 27 April 1940; 5th patrol: 6 June – 2 July 1940; 6th patrol: 1 August – 3 September 1940; 7th patrol: 25 September – 24 October 1940; 8th patrol: 18 December 1940 – 22 January 1941; 9th patrol: 9 April – 29 June 1941; 10th patrol: 6 August – 14 September 1941; 11th patrol: a. 15 October – 21 November 1941; b. 23 – 29 November 1941
- Victories: 35 merchant ships sunk (188,967 GRT); 1 merchant ship damaged (3,670 GRT)

German submarine U-38 was a Type IXA U-boat of Nazi Germany's Kriegsmarine that operated during World War II.

Her keel was laid down on 15 April 1937, by DeSchiMAG AG Weser of Bremen as yard number 943. She was launched on 9 August 1938 and commissioned on 24 October with Kapitänleutnant Heinrich Liebe in command.

U-38 conducted eleven patrols, as part of several flotillas. During her career, she sank more than 30 enemy vessels and damaged a further one. U-38 ranks as one of the most successful U-boats in World War II. She was scuttled west of Wesermünde (Modern Bremerhaven) on 5 May 1945. Throughout the war, the U-Boat suffered no losses among her crew.

== Design ==
As one of the eight original German Type IX submarines, later designated IXA, U-38 had a displacement of 1,032 tonnes (1,016 long tons) when at the surface and 1,153 tonnes (1,135 long tons) while submerged. The U-boat had a total length of 76.50 m (251 ft), a pressure hull length of 58.75 m (192 ft 9 in), a beam of 6.51 m (21 ft 4 in), a height of 9.40 m (30 ft 10 in), and a draught of 4.70 m (15 ft 5 in). The submarine was powered by two MAN M 9 V 40/46 supercharged four-stroke, nine-cylinder diesel engines producing a total of 4,400 metric horsepower (3,240 kW; 4,340 shp) for use while surfaced, two Siemens-Schuckert 2 GU 345/34 double-acting electric motors producing a total of 1,000 metric horsepower (740 kW; 990 shp) for use while submerged. She had two shafts and two 1.92 m (6 ft) propellers. The boat was capable of operating at depths of up to 230 metres (750 ft).

The submarine had a maximum surface speed of 18.2 knots (33.7 km/h; 20.9 mph) and a maximum submerged speed of 7.7 knots (14.3 km/h; 8.9 mph). When submerged, the boat could operate for 65–78 nautical miles (120–144 km; 75–90 mi) at 4 knots (7.4 km/h; 4.6 mph); when surfaced, she could travel 10,500 nautical miles (19,400 km; 12,100 mi) at 10 knots (19 km/h; 12 mph). U-38 was fitted with six 53.3 cm (21 in) torpedo tubes (four fitted at the bow and two at the stern), 22 torpedoes, one 10.5 cm (4.13 in) SK C/32 naval gun, 180 rounds, and a 3.7 cm (1.5 in) SK C/30 as well as a 2 cm (0.79 in) C/30 anti-aircraft gun. The boat had a complement of forty-eight.

== Service history ==
=== First patrol ===
U-38 left the port of Wilhelmshaven on 19 August 1939. The boat operated off the coast of Lisbon, returning to port on 18 September. During this four-week period, she sank two ships.

On 5 September 1939 U-38 stopped the French ship Pluvoise, examined her papers and released her. Pluvoise broadcast the event, warning others of the U-boat. For this, Liebe was reprimanded. The already strict rules restricting submarine warfare were further tightened to prevent a recurrence of the event and all U-boats were instructed to avoid contact with any French merchant vessels.

She sank the British cargo steamship Manaar on 6 September 1939. U-38 opened fire on her, intending to stop her, but she returned fire. This was the first time that a merchantman fired at a U-boat. Surprised by this unexpected response, U-38 dived and sank Manaar with torpedoes. Citing the fact that Manaar had fired at him, Liebe did not assist the survivors, reasoning that the ship was exempted from protection by the Submarine Protocol. Berlin released to the media the narrative that Manaar had fired on U-38 on sight. While Karl Dönitz did not believe that his submarines should have to maintain adherence to the Submarine Protocol in the face of armed merchantmen, due to the political situation, restrictions remained in force after this incident and he was merely able to issue instruction to all submarines to exercise caution. Radio Officer James Turner remained at his post until the last moment. As he was leaving he found two Lascars, one badly injured. Turner rescued both men while under continuous fire from U-38; for this he was awarded the Empire Gallantry Medal.

On 11 September 1939 she shelled and sank Inverliffey, which was flying the Irish tricolour. In spite of Captain William Trowsdale's protestation that they were Irish, Liebe said that they "were sorry" but U-38 sank Inverliffey as she was carrying contraband petrol to England. The crew took to the lifeboats. Inverliffey burned fiercely, endangering the lifeboats. At risk to herself, the German submarine approached, threw lines to the lifeboats and towed them to safety. As Captain Trowsdale's lifeboat was damaged, the occupants were allowed to board the U-boat. The captain did not have a lifebelt, so he was given one. U-38 stopped the American tanker R.G. Stewart and put Inverliffey's crew on board. Just two days earlier, Inver tankers transferred its ships from the Irish to the British registry.

=== Second patrol ===
After nearly two months in port, U-38 left Wilhelmshaven, again with Heinrich Liebe in command, on 12 November 1939. This second patrol was to see the boat operate in the waters northwest of Norway.

On 17 November 1939, Naval High Command (SKL) issued orders for U-38 and U-36 to scout the location for Basis Nord, a secret German naval base off the Kola Peninsula to be provided by the Soviet Union used for raids on allied shipping. The mission required coded messages to be flashed to Soviet naval vessels patrolling the area preceding a Soviet escort to the prospective base location.

U-36 never left the Norwegian Sea, as the British submarine HMS Salmon sank her. U-38 rounded the North Cape uneventfully and arrived in Teriberka Bay by mid-afternoon on 26 November. Running silently into the bay, U-38 had to avoid being sighted by merchant vessels in order to help maintain the Soviet Union's attempted appearance of neutrality at that time. U-38's captain commented that, while in the area of the North Cape and the Kola Peninsula, he had observed thirty to forty targets and regrettably had been "harmless to [all] of them."

After completing the clandestine reconnaissance mission, U-38 returned to raiding duties and sank three ships, two British and one Greek. She sank the British cargo steamship Thomas Walton, 7 December, the Greek cargo steamship Garoufalia on 11 December, and the British cargo steamship Deptford on 13 December. After an operational period of four and a half weeks, U-38 returned to Wilhelmshaven on 16 December.

=== Third patrol ===
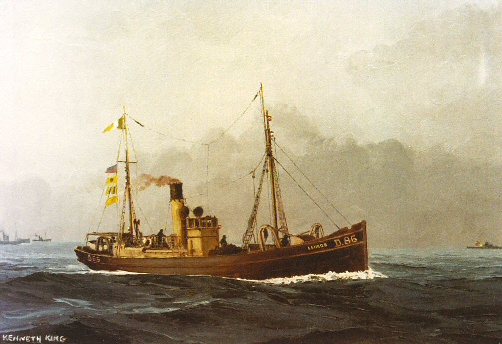
ST Leukos, a neutral fishing trawler that U-38 sank with all hands. Painting by Kenneth King from the National Maritime Museum

Once again, U-38 spent considerable time in port, prior to sailing on 26 February 1940, for operations in the Western Approaches.

U-38 sank six ships. First sent to the bottom was the neutral Irish steam trawler ST Leukos on 9 March, with a single shell at point-blank range off Tory Island, all 11 crew were lost. Leukos was fishing in the company of British trawlers; it has been speculated that she positioned herself between the surfacing U-boat and the fleeing British ship, in the belief that her neutral markings would protect her. This event was followed by the sinking of the Danish cargo motor ships Argentina on 17 March and Algier and Christiansborg on 21 March. The Norwegian cargo motor ship Cometa was sunk on 26 March. The sixth and final ship sunk during this third patrol was the Finnish cargo steamship Signe on 2 April. After nearly six weeks on the high seas, U-38 returned to Wilhelmshaven on 5 April 1940.

=== Fourth patrol ===
U-38 left her home port of Wilhelmshaven with Heinrich Liebe in command on 8 April 1940. She patrolled off Norway, supporting the German occupation of that country. During this patrol, U-38 reported problems with her torpedoes, after HMS Effingham was fired upon with no result. U-38 returned to port on 27 April.

There were two naval battles of Narvik on 10 and 13 April 1940. U-38 and U-65 were positioned at the entrance to the fjord. When the Royal Navy arrived, U-38 fired at HMS Valiant and at HMS Southampton missing both. In the second battle, U-38 fired at Effingham, but the torpedoes malfunctioned, (exploding prematurely).

=== Fifth patrol ===
For her fifth patrol, U-38 again left Wilhelmshaven with Heinrich Liebe in command on 6 June 1940. She was to patrol the waters off southern Ireland. During this operation, Liebe hit six ships, two of which were sailing in convoy at the time. On 14 June, U-38 sank the Greek cargo steamship Mount Myrto. The next day, U-38 sank two ships, both sailing as part of Convoy HX 47, sailing from Halifax to England. First sunk was the Canadian cargo steamship Erik Boye, followed by the Norwegian motor tanker Italia. Five days later, on 20 June, the Swedish cargo steamship Tilia Gorthon was torpedoed and sunk. The Belgian cargo steamship Luxembourg was destroyed on 21 June, followed by the Greek cargo steamship Neion the next day. After three weeks at sea, U-38 returned to Wilhelmshaven on 2 July.

During this patrol, U-38 was able to land Walter Simon, a Nazi agent, at Dingle Bay in Ireland on 12 June. Not realising that the passenger services of the Tralee and Dingle Light Railway had been closed fourteen months earlier, he asked when the next train to Dublin was. He was arrested and interned in the Curragh Camp for the duration of the war.

=== Sixth patrol ===
U-38 left Wilhelmshaven for the last time on 1 August 1940, again with Heinrich Liebe in command. On this month-long patrol off the western coast of Ireland, U-38 hit and sank three ships, all of which were in convoy at the time of attack. On 7 August she sank the Egyptian liner SS Mohamed Ali El-Kebir, which was part of Convoy HX 61 from Halifax to Gibraltar, killing 320 people. The British cargo steamship Llanfair was hit and sunk, travelling as part of SL-41 from Sierra Leone to England. The third and final ship that U-38 sank on her sixth patrol was the British Cypriot steamship Har Zion, which had just left Convoy OB 225 from Liverpool, and was bound for Savannah. After four weeks at sea Liebe returned U-38 to her new home port of Lorient in France on 3 September 1940.

=== Seventh patrol ===
For her first patrol from Lorient and her seventh overall, U-38 was again under the command of Heinrich Liebe. She left on 25 September, for the Northwest Approaches. She attacked five ships on this patrol, sinking four of them. On 1 October, the British cargo motor ship Highland Patriot was torpedoed. After two weeks of no victories, U-38 was successful against the Greek cargo steamship Aenos on 17 October, sailing as part of Convoy SC 7, from Sydney, Nova Scotia to England. The next day she damaged but failed to sink the British cargo steamship Carsbreck, which was part of Convoy SC 7 from Sydney to Grimsby, England. On 19 October she hit two cargo steamships, both members of Convoy HX 79: the Dutch Bilderdijk and British Matheran. After these victories, U-38 returned to Lorient on 24 October 1940.

=== Eighth patrol ===
U-38 left Lorient with Liebe in command once again on 18 December 1940. The eighth war patrol of her career involved operations again in the Northwest Approaches. During this patrol, the submarine hit and sank two ships. On 27 December, U-38 sank the British ship Waiotira, and on 31 December, she sank the Swedish cargo motor ship Valparaiso, which was part of Convoy HX 97 from Halifax to Glasgow. U-38 returned to port on 22 January 1941.

=== Ninth patrol ===
U-38 spent two and a half months in port, before leaving for operations off the west coast of Africa on 9 April 1941. This was her most successful patrol, sinking eight ships. On 4 May she torpedoed the Swedish cargo steamship Japan, which was in Convoy OB 310 from England to the United States. The next day she hit and sank the British cargo motor ship Queen Maud. On 23 May she sank the Dutch cargo motor ship Berhala, which was part of Convoy OB 318 from England to America. She torpedoed and sank the British cargo steamship Vulcain on 24 May. Six days later, on 29 May, she sank the British cargo steamship Tabaristan. She sank the British cargo steamship Empire Protector the next day, and the Norwegian cargo steamship Rinda on the 31st. The eighth and final ship that U-38 sank on her ninth patrol was the British cargo steamship Kingston Hill on 8 June. The boat then returned to Lorient on 29 June 1941, after spending eleven and a half weeks at sea.

=== Tenth patrol ===
For the first time in her career, U-38 put to sea with a new commander, Korvettenkapitän Heinrich Schuch. She left on 6 August, for a five-week patrol in the North Atlantic. During this time one ship was hit, the Panamanian cargo steamship Longtanker on 18 August. U-38 returned to Lorient on 14 September 1941.

=== 11th and 12th Patrols ===
U-38 left Lorient for the last time on 15 October, again with Heinrich Schuch in command. Her eleventh patrol was to take place in the North Atlantic. However, during a period of five weeks, not a single ship was hit. U-38 traveled to the U-boat base in Bergen, Norway on 21 November. She later left Bergen on the 23rd and arrive in Stettin on 29 November.

=== Life after active duty ===
From December 1941 until November 1943, U-38 was used as a training boat in the 24th and 21st U-boat Flotillas. She was then used as a testing boat, until she was scuttled by her crew on 5 May 1945.

=== Wolfpacks ===
U-38 took part in five wolfpacks, namely.

- Prien (12–17 June 1940)
- Grönland (10–27 August 1941)
- Markgraf (27 August – 3 September 1941)
- Schlagetot (20 October – 1 November 1941)
- Raubritter (1–11 November 1941)

== Summary of raiding history ==
During her Kriegsmarine service, U-38 sank 35 merchant ships for 188,967 gross register tons (GRT), and damaged another of 3,670 GRT.

Date	Ship	Nationality	Tonnage	Fate and location
6 September 1939	Manaar	United Kingdom	7,242	Sunk at 38°28′N 10°50′W
11 September 1939	Inverliffey (Note: Changed from Irish to British registry two days previously, but was still flying the flag of Ireland the day that she was sunk.)	(United Kingdom) UK/Ireland	9,456	Sunk at 48°14′N 11°48′W
7 December 1939	Thomas Walton	United Kingdom	4,460	Sunk at 67°52′N 14°28′E
11 December 1939	Garoufalia	Greece	4,708	Sunk at 64°36′N 10°42′E
13 December 1939	Deptford	United Kingdom	4,101	Sunk at 62°15′N 05°08′E
9 March 1940	Leukos	Ireland	216	Sunk at 55°20′N 08°45′W
17 March 1940	Argentina	Denmark	5,375	Sunk at 60°47′N 00°30′W
21 March 1940	Algier	Denmark	1,654	Sunk at 60°17′N 02°49′W
21 March 1940	Christiansborg	Denmark	3,270	Sunk at 60°17′N 02°49′W
26 March 1940	Cometa	Norway	3,794	Sunk at 60°06′N 04°36′W
2 April 1940	Signe	Finland	1,540	Sunk at 58°52′N 01°31′W
14 June 1940	Mount Myrto	Greece	5,403	Sunk at 50°03′N 10°05′W
15 June 1940	Erik Boye	Canada	2,238	Sunk at 50°37′N 08°44′W
15 June 1940	Italia	Norway	9,973	Sunk at 50°37′N 08°44′W
20 June 1940	Tilia Gorthon	Sweden	1,776	Sunk at 48°32′N 06°20′W
21 June 1940	Luxembourg	Belgium	5,809	Sunk at 47°25′N 04°55′W
22 June 1940	Neion	Greece	5,154	Sunk at 47°09′N 04°17′W
7 August 1940	Mohamed Ali El-Kebir	United Kingdom	7,527	Sunk at 55°22′N 13°18′W
11 August 1940	Llanfair	United Kingdom	4,966	Sunk at 54°48′N 13°46′W
31 August 1940	Har Zion	(United Kingdom) Cyprus	2,508	Sunk at 56°20′N 10°00′W
1 October 1940	Highland Patriot	United Kingdom	14,172	Sunk at 52°20′N 19°04′W
17 October 1940	Aenos	Greece	3,554	Sunk at 59°00′N 13°00′W
18 October 1940	Carsbreck	United Kingdom	3,670	Damaged at 36°20′N 10°50′W
19 October 1940	Bilderdijk	Netherlands	6,856	Sunk at 56°35′N 17°15′W
19 October 1940	Matheran	United Kingdom	7,653	Sunk at 57°00′N 17°00′W
27 December 1940	Waiotira	United Kingdom	12,823	Sunk at 58°10′N 16°56′W
31 December 1940	Valparaíso	Sweden	3,760	Sunk at 60°01′N 23°00′W
4 May 1941	Japan	Sweden	5,230	Sunk at 09°50′N 17°50′W
5 May 1941	Queen Maud	United Kingdom	4,976	Sunk at 07°54′N 16°41′W
23 May 1941	Berhala	Netherlands	6,622	Sunk at 09°50′N 17°50′W
24 May 1941	Vulcain	United Kingdom	4,362	Sunk at 09°20′N 15°35′W
29 May 1941	Tabaristan	United Kingdom	6,251	Sunk at 06°32′N 15°23′W
30 May 1941	Empire Protector	United Kingdom	6,181	Sunk at 06°00′N 14°25′W
31 May 1941	Rinda	Norway	6,029	Sunk at 06°52′N 15°14′W
8 June 1941	Kingston Hill	United Kingdom	7,628	Sunk at 09°35′N 29°40′W
18 August 1941	Longtaker	Panama	1,700	Sunk at 61°25′N 30°50′W

== Bibliography ==
- Blair, Clay (1996). Hitler's U-Boat War. London: Weidenfeld & Nicolson. ISBN 0-297-84076-2.
- Busch, Rainer; Röll, Hans-Joachim (1999). German U-boat commanders of World War II : a biographical dictionary. Translated by Brooks, Geoffrey. London, Annapolis, Md: Greenhill Books, Naval Institute Press. ISBN 1-55750-186-6.
- Busch, Rainer; Röll, Hans-Joachim (1999). Deutsche U-Boot-Verluste von September 1939 bis Mai 1945 [German U-boat losses from September 1939 to May 1945]. Der U-Boot-Krieg (in German). Vol. IV. Hamburg, Berlin, Bonn: Mittler. ISBN 3-8132-0514-2.
- Gröner, Erich; Jung, Dieter; Maass, Martin (1991). U-boats and Mine Warfare Vessels. German Warships 1815–1945. Vol. 2. Translated by Thomas, Keith; Magowan, Rachel. London: Conway Maritime Press. ISBN 0-85177-593-4.
- Philbin III, Tobias R., The Lure of Neptune: German-Soviet Naval Collaboration and Ambitions, 1919 – 1941, University of South Carolina Press, 1994, ISBN 0-87249-992-8
