= List of shipwrecks in March 1940 =

The list of shipwrecks in March 1940 includes ships sunk, foundered, grounded, or otherwise lost during March 1940.

== 1 March ==
List of shipwrecks: 1 March 1940
Ship	State	Description
Mirella	Italy	World War II: The 5,340 GRT cargo ship on a voyage from Tyne for Leghorn with a cargo of coal, was torpedoed and damaged in the North Sea off the coast of Suffolk, United Kingdom (52°42′N 2°02′E) by U-20 (Kriegsmarine) with the loss of one of her 30 crew. The survivors were rescued by HMT Cape Argona and HMS Wallace (both Royal Navy). She was sunk in the evening by another torpedo from U-20. The wreck was subsequently dispersed by explosives.
New Yorker	United States	The passenger ship (2,571 GRT) was destroyed by fire whilst laid up at Marlboro, New York.
Troja	Germany	World War II: The cargo ship (2,390 GRT) was intercepted in the evening of 29 February 11 miles west of Aruba, Netherlands Antilles by HMS Despatch (Royal Navy) and was scuttled by her crew. All 19 crew were rescued by HMS Despatch. She sank in the early hours of 1 March.
Vestfoss	Norway	World War II: The cargo ship (1,388 GRT) was bombed and sunk in the North Sea 12 nautical miles (22 km) east by south of Copinsay Orkney Islands, United Kingdom (58°54′N 2°23′W)by Heinkel He 111 aircraft of Kampfgeschwader 26, Luftwaffe. All nineteen crew were rescued by Star of Liberty (United Kingdom).

== 2 March ==
List of shipwrecks: 2 March 1940
Ship	State	Description
Albano	United Kingdom	World War II: The cargo ship (1,176 GRT) struck a mine and sank in the North Sea 4 nautical miles (7.4 km) east of Hartlepool, County Durham. Nine crew were killed. Survivors were rescued by HMT Stella Carino and HMS Wallace (both Royal Navy).
Domala	United Kingdom	World War II: The cargo liner was bombed and set on fire in the North Sea off the coast of Belgium by Heinkel He 111H aircraft of Kampfgeschwader 26, Luftwaffe, with the loss of 108 of the 291 people on board. Domala was towed to the Solent and beached. She was requisitioned by the Ministry of War Transport, converted to a cargo ship and entered service as Empire Attendant.
Elziena	Netherlands	World War II: The coaster (197 GRT) was bombed and sunk in the North Sea 5 nautical miles (9.3 km) off Coquet Island, Northumberland, United Kingdom by Heinkel He 111 aircraft of Kampfgeschwader 26, Luftwaffe, with the loss of two of her five crew.
HMS Fairplay II	Royal Navy	The tug ran aground at Redcar, Yorkshire and was wrecked. All nineteen crew were rescued.
Heidelberg	Germany	World War II: The cargo ship was intercepted in the Caribbean Sea west of the Windward Passage by HMS Dunedin (Royal Navy) and was scuttled by her crew. They were rescued by HMS Dunedin.
Lagaholm	Sweden	World War II: The 2,818 GRT cargo ship on a voyage from Baltimore for Malmö with 4,700 tons of general cargo, was shelled and sunk in the Atlantic Ocean 80 nautical miles (150 km) west of the Kirkwall, Orkney Islands, United Kingdom (59°34′N 5°10′W) by U-32 (Kriegsmarine) with the loss of one of her 28 crew. Survivors were rescued by Belpamela (Norway).
Rijnstroom	Netherlands	World War II: The 695 GRT coaster on a trip from London for Amsterdam with general cargo, was torpedoed and sunk in the North Sea off Zeebrugge, West Flanders, Belgium (51°36′N 2°54′E) by U-17 (Kriegsmarine) with the loss of all twelve crew.
Vilhelmine	Denmark	World War II: The fishing trawler was sunk in the North Sea by Heinkel He 111 aircraft of Kampfgeschwader 26, Luftwaffe. All four crewmen died.
Wolfsburg	Germany	World War II: The cargo ship was intercepted north of Iceland (67°20′N 22°50′W) by HMS Berwick (Royal Navy) and was scuttled by her crew. HMS Berwick rescued all 54 crew.

== 3 March ==
List of shipwrecks: 3 March 1940
Ship	State	Description
Arucas	Germany	World War II: The passenger ship was intercepted in the Atlantic Ocean east of Iceland (63°20′N 14°42′W) by HMS York (Royal Navy) and was scuttled by her crew. Ten crew members were lost at sea. HMS York rescued 42 survivors but three of them died aboard her.
Carron	United Kingdom	World War II: The Admiralty-requisitioned cargo ship was scuttled as a blockship in Water Sound, Scapa Flow.
Cato	United Kingdom	World War II: The cargo ship struck a mine and sank in the Bristol Channel south of Nash Point, Glamorgan (51°24′N 3°33′W) with the loss of thirteen of her fifteen crew. Survivors were rescued by HMT Akita (Royal Navy).
Timber Rush	United States	The cargo ship ran aground at night 85 nautical miles (157 km) south of Acapulco, Mexico and was wrecked. Her crew survived.

== 4 March ==
List of shipwrecks: 4 March 1940
Ship	State	Description
Douglas & Robert	Canada	The sailing ship ran aground at Arnold's Point, Little Harbour, Labrador, Dominion of Newfoundland and was wrecked. Her crew were rescued, but the ship's dog perished.
Pacific Reliance	United Kingdom	World War II: The cargo liner was torpedoed and sunk in the Bristol Channel 32 nautical miles (59 km) off Trevose Head, Cornwall (50°23′N 5°49′W) by U-29 (Kriegsmarine). All 53 crew were rescued by Macville and San Florentino (both United Kingdom).
S.N.A. 1	France	The cargo ship collided with Thurston (United Kingdom) in the Bristol Channel off the north coast of Cornwall and sank. All 31 crew were rescued by Thurston but only one of them survived when she was sunk some hours later.
Thurston	United Kingdom	World War II: The cargo ship was torpedoed and sunk in the Bristol Channel 32 nautical miles (59 km) off Trevose Head (50°23′N 5°49′W) by U-29 (Kriegsmarine) with the loss of 34 crew of her 37 crew. Thirty of the 31 survivors from S.N.A. 1 were also killed. The four survivors were rescued by Moyle (United Kingdom).

== 5 March ==
List of shipwrecks: 5 March 1940
Ship	State	Description
Grutto	Netherlands	World War II: The cargo ship was torpedoed and sunk in the North Sea off Ostend, West Flanders, Belgium (51°41′N 2°47′E) by U-17 (Kriegsmarine) with the loss of all eighteen crew.

== 6 March ==
List of shipwrecks: 6 March 1940
Ship	State	Description
HNLMS O 11	Royal Netherlands Navy	The O 9-class submarine collided with the tug Amsterdam (Netherlands) at Den Helder, North Holland and sank. Three crew were killed. There were 27 survivors. She was refloated on 10 March but was never repaired.
Uruguay	Germany	World War II: The cargo ship was intercepted in the Atlantic Ocean off Iceland (67°52′N 16°08′W) by HMS Berwick (Royal Navy) and was scuttled by her crew without loss of life.

== 7 March ==
List of shipwrecks: 7 March 1940
Ship	State	Description
Amelia Lauro	Italy	World War II: The cargo ship was attacked in the North Sea by Luftwaffe aircraft and set afire. She was on a voyage from Newcastle upon Tyne, Northumberland, United Kingdom to Piombino. She was towed in to Immingham, Lincolnshire, United Kingdom. Subsequently placed under repair, but seized as a prize of war when Italy declared war on the United Kingdom. Returned to service as Empire Activity under the British flag.
Vecht	Netherlands	World War II: The cargo ship was torpedoed and sunk in the North Sea off Knokke-Heist, West Flanders, Belgium (51°45′N 3°05′E) by U-14 (Kriegsmarine) with the loss of all 22 crew.
Yolande-Marguerite	Belgium	World War II: The fishing vessel was sunk in the North Sea off the Noord Hinder Lightship (Netherlands) by Heinkel He 111 aircraft of Kampfgeschwader 26, Luftwaffe, or by a mine. Four crew were killed.

== 8 March ==
List of shipwrecks: 8 March 1940
Ship	State	Description
Counsellor	United Kingdom	World War II: Convoy HX 22: The cargo ship struck a mine and sank in Liverpool Bay 6 nautical miles (11 km) off the Bar Lightship ( Trinity House) (53°38′N 3°23′W). All 78 crew were rescued by HMS Walpole (Royal Navy).
Marie Yette	French Navy	The auxiliary minesweeper (286 GRT) collided with Spramex (France) in the Gironde and sank with the loss of twenty of her crew.
Regina	Cuba	The tanker barge ran aground at Bradenton Beach, Florida, United States in bad weather and was wrecked. One of her eight crew members drowned.

== 9 March ==
List of shipwrecks: 9 March 1940
Ship	State	Description
Abbotsford	United Kingdom	World War II: The collier was torpedoed and sunk in the Atlantic Ocean south west of Cornwall by U-14 (Kriegsmarine) with the loss of all nineteen crew.
Akeld	United Kingdom	World War II: The coaster was torpedoed and sunk in the North Sea (51°44′N 3°22′E) by U-14 (Kriegsmarine) with the loss of all thirteen crew.
Ashley	United Kingdom	The collier ran aground on the Goodwin Sands, Kent. She broke in two on 11 March. All seventeen crew were rescued by the lifeboat Prudential ( Royal National Lifeboat Institution).
Borthwick	United Kingdom	World War II: The cargo ship was torpedoed and sunk in the North Sea (51°44′N 3°22′E) by U-14 (Kriegsmarine). All 21 crew were rescued by the pilot boat Loodsboot No.9 (Netherlands).
Chevychase	United Kingdom	World War II: The cargo ship struck a mine and sank in the North Sea off the north coast of Norfolk 53°18′N 1°13′E). All 21 crew were rescued by the trawler Monimia (United Kingdom).
Hercules	Spain	The cargo ship ran aground in the Paraná River 167 nautical miles (309 km) from its mouth. She broke in two and was a total loss.
Leukos	Ireland	World War II: The 115.2-foot (35.1 m), 216-ton fishing trawler was shelled and sunk 12 miles (19 km) northwest of Tory Island, County Donegal by U-38 (Kriegsmarine) with the loss of all eleven crew.
Maindy Hill	United Kingdom	The cargo ship collided with St. Rosario (United Kingdom) in the North Sea 3 nautical miles (5.6 km) north east of Hartlepool, County Durham and sank. All 23 crew were rescued.
P-100 Murad	French Navy	The auxiliary patrol vessel ran aground near Latakia, Syria and was wrecked.
P. Margaronis	Greece	World War II: The cargo ship was torpedoed and sunk in the Bristol Channel off the north coast of Cornwall by U-28 (Kriegsmarine) with the loss of all 30 crew.
Santa Godelieva	Belgium	World War II: The fishing vessel was sunk in the North Sea off Ostend, West Flanders by a mine or by aircraft of Kampfgeschwader 26, Luftwaffe, with the loss of four crew.

== 11 March ==
List of shipwrecks: 11 March 1940
Ship	State	Description
Amor	Netherlands	World War II: The cargo ship (2,325 GRT) struck a mine and sank in the North Sea (51°24′N 2°09′E). All 35 crew were rescued by City of Bremen (United Kingdom).
Clan Stuart	United Kingdom	The cargo ship collided with Orlock Head (United Kingdom) in the English Channel 18 nautical miles (33 km) south east of Start Point, Devon and sank. All 75 crew were rescued by the fishing trawler Notre Dame de Montlignon (France).
Eulota	Netherlands	World War II: The tanker was torpedoed and damaged in the Atlantic Ocean 120 nautical miles (220 km) west of Ouessant, Finistère, France (48°35′N 8°22′W) by U-28 (Kriegsmarine). All 42 crew were rescued by HMS Wild Swan (Royal Navy) but one died later in hospital. The ship was scuttled by HMS Broke (Royal Navy).
Halifax	United Kingdom	World War II: The fishing trawler caught a mine in her nets whilst fishing in the North Sea. The mine exploded sinking the vessel. All nine crew were rescued by the trawler Ipswich (United Kingdom).
U-31	Kriegsmarine	World War II: The Type VIIA submarine (616/733 t, 1936) was bombed and sunk in the Jade Bight by a Bristol Blenheim aircraft of 82 Squadron, Royal Air Force with the loss of all 58 people on board. She was raised on 15 March, repaired at Wilhelmshaven and returned to service on 30 July.

== 12 March ==
List of shipwrecks: 12 March 1940
Ship	State	Description
Gardenia	United Kingdom	World War II: The cargo ship struck a mine and sank in the North Sea off Cromer, Norfolk (53°04′N 1°33′E). Her 33 crew were rescued by HMT Viviana (Royal Navy).
Rose Effeuilée	France	World War II: The barquentine struck a mine in the North Sea (51°25′N 1°45′E) and sank. Her crew were rescued.

== 13 March ==
List of shipwrecks: 13 March 1940
Ship	State	Description
Ahti	Finland	Winter War: End of War: The tug was scuttled in Lake Ladoga at Sortavala off the Havus Shipyard.
Astra	Finland	Winter War: End of War: The tugboat was scuttled in Lake Ladoga at Sortavala off the Havus Shipyard.
Buizerd	Netherlands	The coaster ran ashore on Kalder Steel, off the coast of Yorkshire, United Kingdom and was wrecked. All six crew were rescued by the lifeboat Robert Patton - The Always Ready ( Royal National Lifeboat Institution). Buizerd was later raised and repaired, resuming service in September 1941.
Eschersheim	Germany	The cargo ship struck a submerged wreck in the Skaggerak off Hirtshals, Denmark and sank some hours later in a snowstorm (57°36′N 9°57′E) with the loss of six of her 31 crew.
Idant	Australia	The coaster sank off the mouth of the Camden Haven River, New South Wales after hitting a breakwater. Her eight crew members were rescued.
Jaameri	Finland	Winter War: End of War: The Board of Navigation liaison ship was burnt or scuttled at Petsamo.
Laatokka	Finland	Winter War: End of War: The dredger was scuttled in Lake Ladoga at Sortavala off the Havus Shipyard.
La Coruña	Germany	World War II: The cargo ship was intercepted in the Atlantic Ocean south east of Iceland (63°00′N 10°20′W) by HMS Maloja (Royal Navy) and was scuttled by her crew, all 68 of whom were rescued by HMS Majola.
Pitkaranta	Finland	Winter War: End of War: The tug was scuttled in Lake Ladoga at Sortavala off the Havus Shipyard.
Rossington Court	United Kingdom	World War II: Convoy HX 26: The cargo ship (6,922 GRT, 1928) was in collision with Athelviking (United Kingdom) in the Atlantic Ocean 600 nautical miles (1,100 km) east of Halifax, Nova Scotia, Canada, and sank. All 37 crew were rescued.
Toysa	Finland	Winter War: End of War: The tugboat was scuttled in Lake Ladoga at Sortavala off the Havus Shipyard.
Turja	Finland	Winter War: End of War: The Border Guard patrol ship was burnt or scuttled at Petsamo.
U-44	Kriegsmarine	World War II: The Type IXA submarine struck a mine in the North Sea off the coast of the Netherlands (54°14′N 5°06′E) and sank with the loss of all 47 crew.

== 15 March ==
List of shipwrecks: 15 March 1940
Ship	State	Description
Melrose	United Kingdom	World War II: The cargo ship (1,589 GRT) struck a mine and sank in the North Sea off the coast of Belgium (51°21′N 2°13′E). Seventeen of her crew were killed.
HMT Peridot	Royal Navy	World War II: The naval trawler (398 GRT) struck a mine and was damaged in the English Channel off Dover, Kent (51°00′N 1°35′E). Her whole crew was rescued by HMT Saon (Royal Navy) and the ship was taken in tow by HMS Brilliant (Royal Navy). Lady Duncannon (United Kingdom) later took over the tow but HMT Peridot sank before she could be brought into port. There were no casualties.
Saba	Netherlands	World War II: The coaster struck a mine and sank in the North Sea with the loss of all seven hands.

== 16 March ==
List of shipwrecks: 16 March 1940
Ship	State	Description
Kahika	Australia	The cargo ship sank off West Point, Tasmania after striking an uncharted rock. Her 24 crew members were rescued.
HMT Maida	Royal Navy	World War II: The naval trawler struck a mine and sank in the North Sea east of the North Foreland, Kent, with the loss of six of her twelve crew. Survivors were rescued by HMT Mare (Royal Navy).
Osman	Sweden	The cargo ship ran aground in the Skaggerak off Risør, Norway and was wrecked. Eleven of her twenty crew died.
Slava	Yugoslavia	World War II: The cargo ship struck a mine and sank in the Bristol Channel south of Nash Point, Glamorgan, United Kingdom (51°19′45″N 3°38′45″W) with the loss of one of her 34 crew.
Xania	United Kingdom	The fishing trawler sank after a collision with the fishing trawler Aberdeen (United Kingdom) in the fishing grounds off the coast of Ireland. Her crew were rescued by Aberdeen.

== 17 March ==
List of shipwrecks: 17 March 1940
Ship	State	Description
Alyn	United Kingdom	The coaster ran aground on Fort Island, Isle of Man with the loss of two of her nine crew.
Argentina	Denmark	World War II: The cargo ship was torpedoed and sunk in the Atlantic Ocean east of the Shetland Islands, United Kingdom (60°47′N 0°30′W) by U-38 (Kriegsmarine) with the loss of all 33 crew.
Basra	Panama	World War II: Convoy ON 20: The cargo ship was in a collision with Listo (Norway) in the North Sea and sank. Her 27 crew were rescued by Løvaas (Norway).
Capitaine Augustin	France	World War II: The cargo ship struck a mine and sank in the North Sea north of Margate, Kent, United Kingdom with the loss of two of her crew. There were 28 survivors. The wreck was subsequently dispersed by explosives.
Hinde	Netherlands	The coaster sank after hitting rocks near Rathlin Island, County Antrim, United Kingdom. All seven crew survived.
Kitahuku Maru	Japan	The cargo ship ran aground at off Kumejima Island (26°20′N 126°56′E) and was wrecked.
Ocean Drift	United Kingdom	The fishing vessel collided with HMS Intrepid (Royal Navy) in the North Sea and sank with the loss of two of her ten crew. Survivors were rescued by HMS Intrepid.
Sint Annaland	Netherlands	World War II: The cargo ship struck a mine and sank in the North Sea off the coast of Belgium (51°23′N 2°01′E). All 21 crew were rescued by Schieland and Schokland (both Netherlands).

== 18 March ==
List of shipwrecks: 18 March 1940
Ship	State	Description
Soar	United Kingdom	The 117.1-foot (35.7 m), 219-ton steam fishing trawler foundered in a storm on rocks known as "The Black Waughs" 1/2 nautical mile (930 m) south of Gourdon, Aberdeenshire. All six crew lost their lives.
Tina Primo	Italy	World War II: The cargo ship struck a mine and was damaged in the North Sea off the east coast of Kent, United Kingdom. She was taken in tow by Kenia (United Kingdom) but struck two more mines and sank (51°20′N 1°42′E) with the loss of one of her 37 crew.

== 19 March ==
List of shipwrecks: 19 March 1940
Ship	State	Description
Charkow	Denmark	World War II: The cargo ship was torpedoed and sunk in the North Sea off the north coast of Inverness-shire, United Kingdom (58°07′N 2°39′W) by U-19 (Kriegsmarine) with the loss of all twenty crew.
HMT Lowdock	Royal Navy	The Castle-class naval trawler was struck by HMT Lady Philomena (Royal Navy) in the North Sea 5 miles (8.0 km) east of Tod Head (56°49′N 2°07′W) and sank in 52 metres (171 ft) of water with the loss of eleven crew. Only her mate survived.
Minsk	Denmark	World War II: The cargo ship was torpedoed, shelled and sunk in the North Sea off the north coast of Inverness-shire (58°07′N 2°39′W) by U-19 (Kriegsmarine) with the loss of eleven of her twenty crew. Survivors were rescued by HMS Esk (Royal Navy).

== 20 March ==
List of shipwrecks: 20 March 1940
Ship	State	Description
Barn Hill	United Kingdom	World War II: The cargo ship was bombed and damaged in the English Channel 3 nautical miles (5.6 km) south south west of Beachy Head, Sussex by Heinkel He 111 aircraft of Kampfgeschwader 26, Luftwaffe. Five of her 34 crew were lost. Survivors were rescued by the Eastbourne Lifeboat Jane Holland ( Royal National Lifeboat Institution). Barn Hill was beached south east of Langney Point but broke her back on 26 March, a total loss.
Bothal	Denmark	World War II: The cargo ship was torpedoed and sunk in the North Sea off the north coast of Inverness-shire, United Kingdom by U-19 (Kriegsmarine) with the loss of fifteen of her twenty crew.
Protinus	Netherlands	World War II: The fishing trawler was bombed and sunk in the North Sea by Heinkel He 111 aircraft of Kampfgeschwader 26, Luftwaffe, with the loss of two of her twelve crew. Two others died before the survivors were rescued on 25 March by HMS Unity (Royal Navy).
Svinta	Norway	World War II: Convoy ON 21: The cargo ship was bombed and damaged in the North Sea by Luftwaffe aircraft. She was taken in tow by St Mellons (United Kingdom) but sank 4.75 nautical miles (8.80 km) east of Copinsay, Orkney Islands, United Kingdom following and explosion. She may have struck a mine. There were no casualties. Also reported as torpedoed and sunk on 21 March by U-57 (Kriegsmarine).
Viking	Denmark	World War II: The cargo ship was torpedoed and sunk in the North Sea off the north coast of Inverness-shire (58°08′N 2°38′W) by U-19 (Kriegsmarine) with the loss of fifteen of her seventeen crew.

== 21 March ==
List of shipwrecks: 21 March 1940
Ship	State	Description
Algier	Denmark	World War II: The cargo ship was torpedoed and sunk in the Atlantic Ocean west of the Shetland Islands, United Kingdom (60°17′N 2°49′W), by U-38 (Kriegsmarine) with the loss of four crew members and a passenger. 18 survivors were rescued by Manx King (United Kingdom) 15 miles (24 km) north north west of Foula, Shetland Island.
Christiansborg	Denmark	World War II: The cargo ship was torpedoed and sunk in the Atlantic Ocean north of the Shetland Islands, United Kingdom (60°17′N 2°49′W), by U-38 (Kriegsmarine) with the loss of one of her 25 crew. Survivors were rescued by HMS Discovery II (Royal Navy).
Gondolier	United Kingdom	World War II: The paddle steamer was scuttled as a blockship in Water Sound, Scapa Flow, Orkney Islands, or capsized and sank in deep water during a gale.
Heddernheim	Germany	World War II: The cargo ship was torpedoed and sunk in the Skaggerak north east of Skagen, Denmark (57°48′40″N 10°53′30″E) by HMS Ursula (Royal Navy). All 36m crew survived, being allowed to leave the ship before she was torpedoed. One was taken prisoner by HMS Ursula.

== 22 March ==
List of shipwrecks: 22 March 1940
Ship	State	Description
Neme	Estonia	The cargo ship was damaged by ice and sank in the Baltic Sea. Her crew survived.
Sandö	Sweden	The cargo ship (1,282 GRT) collided in dense fog with Nujolla (Sweden) and sank in the Oslofjord 1.5 miles (2.4 km) southwest of Færder Lighthouse, Norway. There were no casualties.

== 23 March ==
List of shipwrecks: 23 March 1940
Ship	State	Description
Edmund Hugo Stinnes IV	Germany	World War II: The cargo ship was shelled and stopped in the Skaggerak off Jutland, Denmark by HMS Truant (Royal Navy) and subsequently sunk with torpedoes. Her captain was taken as a prisoner of war. The rest of her crew reached land safely.
La Railleuse	Marine Nationale	The L'Adroit-class destroyer was sunk in the Mediterranean Sea off Casablanca, Morocco by the accidental explosion of her own torpedoes with the loss of 28 of her crew. There were also 24 wounded.
HMT Loch Assater	Royal Navy	World War II: The naval trawler struck a mine in the North Sea 61 nautical miles (113 km) north of Kinnaird Head, Aberdeenshire and sank. Her crew were rescued by HMT Strathtummel (Royal Navy).

== 24 March ==
List of shipwrecks: 24 March 1940
Ship	State	Description
Ostpreussen	Germany	The cargo ship ran aground off Skallerup, Denmark 5 nautical miles (9.3 km) from the Hirtshals Lighthouse after striking a reef. She was refloated on 30 March.

== 25 March ==
List of shipwrecks: 25 March 1940
Ship	State	Description
Britta	Denmark	World War II: The cargo ship was torpedoed and sunk in the North Sea north east of the Shetland Islands, United Kingdom (60°00′N 4°19′W) by U-47 (Kriegsmarine) with the loss of thirteen of her eighteen crew. Survivors were rescued by Nancy (Denmark).
Daghestan	United Kingdom	World War II: The tanker was torpedoed and sunk in the North Sea 9 miles east of Copinsay, Orkney Islands at (59°21′N 1°48′W) or (58°47′N 2°46′W) by U-57 (Kriegsmarine) with the loss of four of her 29 crew. Survivors were rescued by HMT Brontes and HMT Northern Wave (both Royal Navy).

== 26 March ==
List of shipwrecks: 26 March 1940
Ship	State	Description
Cometa	Norway	World War II: The cargo ship (3,794 GRT) was torpedoed and sunk in the Atlantic Ocean west of the Shetland Islands, United Kingdom (60°06′N 4°36′W) by U-38 (Kriegsmarine). All 42 people on board were rescued by HMS Northern Sky (Royal Navy).
U-21	Kriegsmarine	The Type IIB submarine ran aground off Mandal, Norway (58°01′N 7°29′E). She was later refloated and interned at Kristiansand-Sud until 9 April 1940. She was then used as a training boat until 1944.

== 27 March ==
List of shipwrecks: 27 March 1940
Ship	State	Description
AD 381 Blei Mor	French Navy	The auxiliary patrol boat sank off Dunkerque, Nord after running in a sandbank during a storm.

== 28 March ==
List of shipwrecks: 28 March 1940
Ship	State	Description
Burgos	Norway	World War II: Convoy FS 31: The cargo ship struck a mine and sank in the North Sea north of Wells-next-the-Sea, Norfolk, United Kingdom. All 33 crew were rescued by HMS Pelican (Royal Navy).
Mimi Horn	Germany	World War II: The cargo ship was intercepted in the Denmark Strait (65°50′N 28°30′W) by HMS Transylvania (Royal Navy) and was scuttled by her crew. All 41 crew were rescued by HMS Transylvania.

== 29 March ==
List of shipwrecks: 29 March 1940
Ship	State	Description
Hebridean	Canada	The schooner was rammed by the cargo ship Esmond (United Kingdom) and sank at the entrance of the port of Halifax, Nova Scotia. There were nine fatalities.
Mimi Horn	Germany	World War II: The cargo vessel was scuttled between Iceland and Greenland to prevent capture by HMS Transylvania (Royal Navy). Transylvania rescued the crew.

== 30 March ==
List of shipwrecks: 30 March 1940
Ship	State	Description
Thordoc	Canada	The cargo ship ran aground off Winging Point, 20 nautical miles (37 km) south of Louisbourg, Nova Scotia and was wrecked. Her crew were rescued.

== 31 March ==
List of shipwrecks: 31 March 1940
Ship	State	Description
Farndale	United Kingdom	The cargo ship arrived at Takoradi, Gold Coast on fire. She was beached the next day and was gutted. She was declared a constructive total loss.
Nydalen	Norway	The cargo ship foundered 1 nautical mile (1.9 km) off Arinagour, Coll, United Kingdom. Her fourteen crew were rescued.
Walsingham	United Kingdom	The fishing trawler was helping a neutral steamship, which had gone aground on the east coast of England when the steamship slipped on a shelf and collided with Walsingham, which foundered (51°40′N 1°35′E). Her crew were rescued.

== Unknown date ==
List of shipwrecks: Unknown date 1940
Ship	State	Description
U-22	Kriegsmarine	World War II: The Type IIB submarine was declared missing since 27 March 1940 in the North Sea or Skaggerak. Presumed lost with all 27 hands.
