= ST Leukos =

Irish commercial trawler

Coordinates: 55°57′N 9°15′W

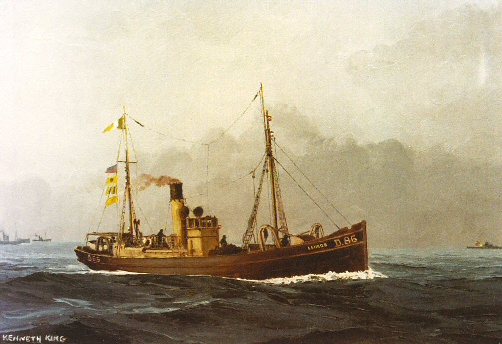
- Painting by Kenneth King from the National Maritime Museum

History

Ireland
- Name: Leukos
- Namesake: Greek Λεῦκος, "white"
- Owner: 1915: National Steam Fishing Co., Aberdeen.; 1920: Tucker, Tippet & Co., Aberdeen.; 1929: Dublin Trawlers, Ice and Cold Storage Co., 8 Cardiff Lane, Dublin.
- Port of registry: Dublin, Ireland
- Builder: John Duthie Torry Shipbuilding Co. Ltd
- Yard number: 405
- Fate: Sunk by gunfire 9 March 1940
- Notes: June 1915: Requisitioned by the Admiralty and converted to a boom defence vessel. 1919: Returned to owners.

General characteristics
- Class & type: Steel side trawler
- Tonnage: 216 GRT; 83 NRT
- Length: 166 ft (51 m)
- Beam: 21 ft (6.4 m)
- Depth: 11 ft (3.4 m)
- Installed power: Coal-fired, Steam. T.3 cyl., 55 rhp.; by Charles D. Holmes, Hull.
- Propulsion: single screw
- Sail plan: Ketch-rigged
- Crew: 11

ST Leukos was an Irish commercial trawler that was sunk off the north coast of Ireland by a German U-boat on 9 March 1940. The vessel, which had been fishing in the company of British trawlers, was attacked by the German submarine U-38 off Tory Island. The submarine surfaced opening fire with its deck gun. All 11 crew members were lost.

The reason for the attack has never been proved. As a neutral country, all Irish ships, including the Leukos, were unarmed and clearly marked. Several theories exist. First the Leukos had positioned herself between the fleeing British trawlers in the hope that the U-boat would respect Irish Neutrality. Second that she tried to ram the U-boat. This is the view taken by the Irish Seamen's Relatives Association which holds that the Leukos attempted to ram the U-38 as it threatened the British fishing fleet. They maintain that this selfless bravery should be acknowledged by the British government. Death certificates for the lost crew were not issued until 1986.

== History ==
ST Leukos was built in Aberdeen in 1914 by the John Duthie Torry Shipbuilding Co. Ltd. for the National Steam Fishing Company of Aberdeen. She was powered by a coal-fired steam engine. During World War I she was requisitioned by the British Admiralty and used as a "boom defence vessel"; that is: she maintained the buoys, hawsers and netting of a boom defence.

Initially she fished from Aberdeen. In 1920 she was sold to Tucker, Tippet and Company and continued fishing out of Aberdeen. On 27 February 1927 she was in a collision with ST Thomas Bartlett. Later that year she was sold to the Dublin Trawlers, Ice and Cold Storage Company with offices at 8 Cardiff Lane, Dublin. She was transferred to the Irish registry. She was based at Hanover Quay, Ringsend, Dublin

== Original Account ==
On 9 February 1940 the Leukos sailed from Hanover Quay under Captain James Potter Thomasson, from Fleetwood, Lancashire. She called to Troon, Scotland for coaling and then headed for 'the bank', a fishing ground, north-west of Tory Island. She was scheduled to return to Dublin on 12 March 1940, but failed to return. On 21 March her empty lifeboat was found off Scarinish on the Island of Tiree in the Scottish Inner Hebrides. On 26 March, Lloyd's of London declared the Leukos and her crew were presumed lost.

This loss remained a mystery until 1986. There were theories: was she on a target list because of her previous role as a boom defence vessel; or was there a structural weakness caused by her collision with ST Thomas Bartlett? The general assumption was that she struck a mine. Officially she was listed as 'missing'. Further details were uncovered by Peter Mulvany, grand-nephew of Patricio McCarthy, one of those lost. They were published in the Spring 1987 edition of the Journal of the Maritime Institute of Ireland. His sources were former U-boat personnel and recently declassified intelligence resulting from decryption of encrypted German radio communications, known as ‘Ultra’. The other trawlers with the Leukos were: John Morris of Aberdeen, Alvis of Fleetwood, Pelagos of Fleetwood, Flying Admiral of Fleetwood, Seddock of Grimbsy; the Alvis and Pelagos were armed Trawlers each having a 3-pounder gun mounted aft. (Seddock might have also been armed)

== U-38 ==
=== Inverliffey ===
On 11 September 1939, U-38, on its first patrol, shelled and sunk the Irish-flagged oil tanker Inverliffey carrying 13,000 tons of gasolene. The blazing oil threatened to engulf the Inverliffey's lifeboats. At some risk to the U-38, it towed the lifeboats away from the flames. They were later rescued by the American oil-tanker R.G. Stewart, which transferred them to the American freighter SS City of Joliet and landed at Antwerp, Belgium. William Trowsdale, master of the Inverliffey, had protested to the Kapitänleutnant Heinrich Liebe of the U-38 that as a neutral Irish ship, his ship should not be attacked, but the German captain responded that, as the ship was carrying gasoline, a war material, for the British, she was a legitimate military target. Éamon de Valera permitted Inver Tankers, the owners of the Inverliffey, to transfer their seven tankers to the British registry at the outbreak of the war, therefore their continued flying of the Irish tricolour was questionable.

=== Leukos ===
The account of the sinking of the Leukos, as recorded in the U-38 war diary, is curious. At 20:00 he surfaced

"After surfacing 6 steamers with lights on were sighted which apparently formed a guard line with north-south course. I decided to give one of them a lesson with our gun".

He remained, surfaced, for over an hour. At 21:13

"fired one shot on one trawler at 200m distance. Hit engine room, steamer disappeared in smoke and dust".

He wrote that the Leukos had not sunk!

"Later it was recognised that the steamer had not sunk as presumed before. Decided not to attack again".

He also wrote that some other trawlers were unaware of the incident

"others seemed not to have noticed the gunfire".

It is not known why the U-38 sank a neutral Irish trawler, leaving the five British trawlers unmolested. Nor is it known why he waited an hour. In 1988 an effort was made to ask Kapitän Liebe. He declined to speak. He died in July 1997.

=== German spy ===
On its fifth patrol the U-38 landed Walter Simon, alias "Karl Anderson", a Nazi agent, at Dingle Bay in Ireland on the night of 12 June. Simon was an experienced spy. He had several successful trips to England. Not noticing grass overgrown on the rusting rail-tracks of the Tralee and Dingle Light Railway which had closed 14 months earlier, he asked "when is the next train?" He was later arrested.

== See also ==
- Irish neutrality during World War II (external issues)
- The Emergency (internal issues)
- Irish Mercantile Marine during World War II

== Notes ==
=== Bibliography ===
- Irish Seamens' Relatives Association
- Wilson, Ian. Donegal Shipwrecks Impact Printing 1998 – ISBN 0-948154-56-X
