= German submarine U-47 (1938) =

World War II German submarine

- 15 October 1939. U-47 returns to port after sinking HMS Royal Oak. The battleship Scharnhorst is in the background.

History

Nazi Germany
- Name: U-47
- Ordered: 21 November 1936
- Builder: Germaniawerft, Kiel
- Yard number: 582
- Laid down: 27 February 1937
- Launched: 29 October 1938
- Commissioned: 17 December 1938
- Fate: Missing 7 March 1941, in the North Atlantic near the Rockall Bank and Trough.

General characteristics
- Class & type: Type VIIB U-boat
- Displacement: 753 t (741 long tons) surfaced; 857 t (843 long tons) submerged
- Length: 66.50 m (218 ft 2 in) o/a; 48.80 m (160 ft 1 in) pressure hull
- Beam: 6.20 m (20 ft 4 in) o/a; 4.70 m (15 ft 5 in) pressure hull
- Draught: 4.74 m (15 ft 7 in)
- Installed power: 2,800–3,200 PS (2,100–2,400 kW; 2,800–3,200 bhp) (diesels); 750 PS (550 kW; 740 shp) (electric)
- Propulsion: 2 shafts; 2 × diesel engines; 2 × electric motors
- Speed: 17.9 knots (33.2 km/h; 20.6 mph) surfaced; 8 knots (15 km/h; 9.2 mph) submerged
- Range: 8,700 nmi (16,112 km; 10,012 mi) at 10 knots (19 km/h; 12 mph) surfaced; 90 nmi (170 km; 100 mi) at 4 knots (7.4 km/h; 4.6 mph) submerged
- Test depth: 230 m (750 ft); Calculated crush depth: 250–295 m (820–968 ft)
- Complement: 4 officers, 40–56 enlisted
- Sensors & processing systems: Gruppenhorchgerät
- Armament: 5 × 53.3 cm (21 in) torpedo tubes (four bow, one stern); 14 × torpedoes or 26 TMA mines; 1 × 8.8 cm (3.46 in) deck gun (220 rounds); 1 × 2 cm (0.79 in) C/30 anti-aircraft gun

Service record
- Part of: 7th U-boat Flotilla; 17 December 1938 – 7 March 1941
- Identification codes: M 18 837
- Commanders: Kptlt. / K.Kapt. Günther Prien; 17 December 1938 – 7 March 1941
- Operations: 10 patrols: 1st patrol: 19 August – 15 September 1939; 2nd patrol: a. 8 – 17 October 1939; b. 20 – 21 October 1939; 3rd patrol: a. 16 November – 18 December 1939; b. 29 February – 5 March 1940; 4th patrol: 11 – 29 March 1940; 5th patrol: 3 – 26 April 1940; 6th patrol: 3 June – 6 July 1940; 7th patrol: 27 August – 25 September 1940; 8th patrol: 14 – 23 October 1940; 9th patrol: 3 November – 6 December 1940; 10th patrol: 20 February – 7 March 1941
- Victories: 30 merchant ships sunk (162,769 GRT); 1 warship sunk (29,150 tons); 8 merchant ships damaged (62,751 GRT); 1 warship damaged (10,035 tons)

German submarine U-47 was a Type VIIB U-boat of Nazi Germany's Kriegsmarine during World War II. She was laid down on 25 February 1937 at Friedrich Krupp Germaniawerft in Kiel as yard number 582 and went into service on 17 December 1938 under the command of Günther Prien.

During U-47's career, she sank a total of 31 enemy vessels, including the British battleship HMS Royal Oak, and damaged nine more. U-47 was the thirteenth most successful U-boat of World War II based on tonnage of enemy shipping sunk.

U-47 disappeared in March 1941, and the 45 crewmembers are presumed to have died. Her fate remains unknown.

== Design ==
German Type VIIB submarines were preceded by the shorter Type VIIA submarines. U-47 had a displacement of 753 tonnes (741 long tons) when at the surface and 857 tonnes (843 long tons) while submerged. She had a total length of 66.50 m (218 ft 2 in), a pressure hull length of 48.80 m (160 ft 1 in), a beam of 6.20 m (20 ft 4 in), a height of 9.50 m (31 ft 2 in), and a draught of 4.74 m (15 ft 7 in). The submarine was powered by two Germaniawerft F46 four-stroke, six-cylinder supercharged diesel engines producing a total of 2,800 to 3,200 PS (2,060 to 2,350 kW; 2,760 to 3,160 shp) for use while surfaced, two AEG GU 460/8-276 double-acting electric motors producing a total of 750 PS (550 kW; 740 shp) for use while submerged. She had two shafts and two 1.23 m (4 ft) propellers. The boat was capable of operating at depths of up to 230 metres (750 ft).

The submarine had a maximum surface speed of 17.9 knots (33.2 km/h; 20.6 mph) and a maximum submerged speed of 8 knots (15 km/h; 9.2 mph). When submerged, the boat could operate for 90 nautical miles (170 km; 100 mi) at 4 knots (7.4 km/h; 4.6 mph); when surfaced, she could travel 8,700 nautical miles (16,100 km; 10,000 mi) at 10 knots (19 km/h; 12 mph). U-47 was fitted with five 53.3 cm (21 in) torpedo tubes (four fitted at the bow and one at the stern), fourteen torpedoes, one 8.8 cm (3.46 in) SK C/35 naval gun, 220 rounds, and one 2 cm (0.79 in) C/30 anti-aircraft gun. The boat had a complement of between forty-four and sixty.

== Service history ==
U-47 carried out ten combat patrols and spent a total of 238 days at sea. She sank 31 enemy ships (totalling 162,769 GRT and 29,150 tons) and damaged eight more. Prior to her disappearance in March 1941, U-47 lost one crewman, Heinrich Mantyk, who fell overboard on 5 September 1940.

=== First patrol ===
U-47 was assigned to the 7th U-boat Flotilla on 17 December 1938, the day she was commissioned. She was an operational boat in the 7th Flotilla for her entire career. U-47 was sent to sea in a pre-emptive move before war broke out in September 1939; this move would enable her to engage enemy vessels as soon as the war began. She left for her first war patrol on 19 August 1939 (two weeks before the commencement of hostilities), from the port of Kiel. During her first patrol, she circumnavigated the British Isles and entered the Bay of Biscay to commence patrol of Area I. On 3 September, war was declared and U-47 received orders to initiate hostilities against British ships, but none were encountered on the first day. News of the sinking of Athenia by German submarine U-30 reached Prien the following day, along with further orders to strictly adhere to the Submarine Protocol. The first ship encountered by U-47 during the war was a neutral Greek freighter which Prien inspected but released unharmed. Two further neutral vessels were encountered and Prien declined to even stop them.

Just after dawn on 5 September, Engelbert Endrass – serving as first watch officer aboard U-47 – spotted Bosnia zigzagging and blacked out. Prien surfaced and fired a single shot from his 88 mm deck gun to stop the ship but instead Bosnia made steam and began radioing an alert ('SSS') along with its name and position. Prien then immediately fired an additional four rounds of which three hit the ship, prompting its crew to abandon ship. U-47 rendered assistance to the crew of Bosnia, bringing them aboard the submarine and helping to set up a lifeboat which had capsized during the crew's escape. A Norwegian ship also arrived and took all of the survivors aboard. Following its departure, Prien fired a single torpedo which sank the ship with its load of sulfur almost immediately. The 2,407 GRT Bosnia became the second British ship, and first freighter, sunk after Athenia.

It was later the next day when U-47 encountered a larger British freighter, the 4,086 GRT Rio Carlo. Again, Prien opted to surface and make a gun attack on the merchant. While the Rio Carlo did stop moving, it nonetheless broadcast the submarine alert, prompting Prien to fire an ineffective warning shot. A further three shots from the deck gun were fired onto the bridge of Rio Carlo, upon which the broadcast ceased and the crew abandoned ship. Once the crew was away, Prien finished the ship and sent its mixed cargo to the bottom with a single torpedo. While U-47's crew was inspecting the lifeboats and ensuring the survivors had provisions, an aircraft appeared and U-47 dived, departing the area and leaving the crew to others to rescue.

On 7 September, Prien encountered yet another British freighter, and once again initiated a surface attack on it. Trying to escape, Gartavon broadcast the submarine alert, drawing fire from the deck gun. The mast and radio antenna were destroyed and the ship came about while the crew put into a lifeboat. Surprising Prien, Gartavon crew had rigged the ship to get underway in an attempt to ram the attacking submarine. She began to make steam after her crew departed, and Prien was forced to take emergency measures to avoid the ship. After avoiding the abandoned Gartavon, Prien inspected the lifeboat and after its crew declined the offer to fetch a second lifeboat from the circling freighter, he left them; all of the crew survived. Prien refused to radio for assistance on account of the attempt to ram him. He returned to Gartavon and attempted to finish her as he had his previous victims, but the torpedo malfunctioned and Prien instead used the deck gun to wreck the ship and sink its cargo of iron ore.

During this first patrol, which ended with her arrival in Kiel on 15 September 1939, three ships were sunk for a total of 8,270 GRT.

=== Sinking of HMS Royal Oak ===
Infiltration of Scapa Flow by U-47

On 8 October 1939, U-47 began her second patrol. On 14 October 1939 (six days after leaving port), she succeeded in penetrating the Royal Navy's primary base at Scapa Flow. Although most of the Home Fleet was not at the base at the time, U-47 spotted the battleship HMS Royal Oak 4 kilometres (2.5 mi) away. After working herself into an attack position, she opened fire with torpedoes. Her first two salvos caused only minor damage to the bow, severing an anchor chain. After reloading the bow tubes, the last salvo of three torpedoes struck the British warship, causing severe flooding. Taking on a list of 15 degrees, her open portholes were submerged, worsening the flooding and increasing the list to 45 degrees; Royal Oak sank within 15 minutes with the loss of 835 men and boys.

After this attack, Prien received the nickname Der Stier von Scapa Flow ("The Bull of Scapa Flow"); the emblem of a snorting bull was then painted on the conning tower of U-47 and the image soon became the emblem of the entire 7th U-boat Flotilla. Prien was awarded the Knight's Cross of the Iron Cross, the first sailor of a U-boat and the second member of the Kriegsmarine to receive this decoration. The rest of the crew members were awarded the Iron Cross. Two other U-47 crew members also earned the Knight's Cross later on during World War II: the chief engineer (Leitender Ingenieur) Johann-Friedrich Wessels and 1st watch officer (I. Wachoffizier) Engelbert Endrass.

Many years later, in September 2002, one of the unexploded torpedoes that U-47 had fired during the attack on Royal Oak rose to the surface from its resting place on the bottom. The torpedo, minus its warhead, drifted towards the shore and was spotted by a crewman aboard the Norwegian tanker Petrotrym. A Royal Navy tugboat intercepted the torpedo, and after identifying it as having belonged to U-47 63 years earlier, EOD (explosive ordnance disposal) personnel discarded it one mile (1.6 km) from shore. In 2016, another of the faulty torpedoes shot at HMS Royal Oak was found and identified by British divers.

=== Third to ninth patrol ===
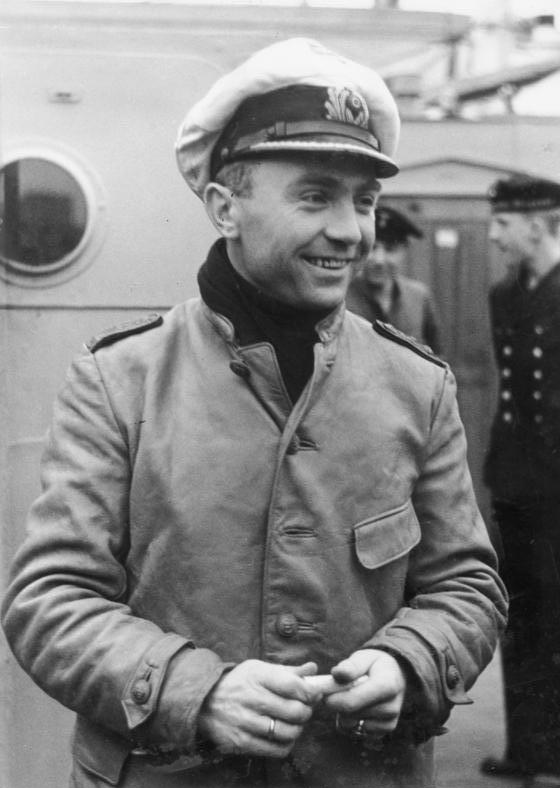
Kriegsmarine U-boat commander Günther Prien

Conning tower art of U-47. This image was later used as the emblem for the entire 7th U-boat Flotilla

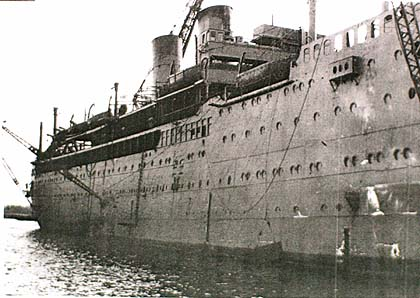
Arandora Star, sunk 2 July 1940

After a lavish celebration in Berlin celebrating the sinking of HMS Royal Oak in which the crew members of U-47 were received by Adolf Hitler and decorated, the boat returned to sea on 16 November 1939. Once the U-boat had left Kiel on 16 November, she headed out into the North Sea. After traveling around the British Isles into the Bay of Biscay and the English Channel, U-47 sank three more ships: Navasota on 5 December, the Norwegian Britta on 6 December, and Dutch Tajandoen on 7 December. After the sinking of Navasota, British destroyers briefly fired depth charges at the U-boat, but she evaded the attack without any damage.

U-47 left the port of Wilhelmshaven and began her fourth patrol on 11 March 1940. For 19 days, she roamed the North Sea in search of any Allied convoys. On 25 March, she torpedoed and sank the Danish cargo motor ship Britta north of Scotland. She returned to Wilhelmshaven on 29 March.

U-47's fifth patrol was the first in which she failed to sink a ship. She left Wilhelmshaven on 3 April 1940, and headed again out into the North Sea. On 19 April, she fired a torpedo at the British battleship HMS Warspite with no result. Several destroyers attempted to sink the U-boat with depth charges but U-47 managed to escape.

U-47's sixth patrol was much more successful. Having left Kiel on 3 June 1940, she ventured out into the North Sea and operated off the southern coast of Ireland. Along with six other U-boats in Wolfpack Prien, she attacked Convoy HX 47 and sank the British Balmoralwood on 14 June. She later sank seven more vessels, San Fernando on the 21st, Cathrine on the 24th, Lenda and Leticia on the 27th, Empire Toucan on the 29th, Georgios Kyriakides on the 30th, and Arandora Star on 2 July. The submarine returned to Kiel on 6 July after 34 days at sea and eight enemy ships sunk.

U-47's seventh patrol consisted of her travelling north of the British Isles and into the North Atlantic, south of Iceland. During a period of 30 days, she sank a total of six enemy ships and damaged another. U-47's first victory during her seventh patrol was the sinking of the Belgian passenger ship Ville de Mons on 2 September 1940. This was followed by the sinking of a British ship, Titan, on 4 September and Gro, José de Larrinaga, and Neptunian on the 7th. On the 9th, U-47 sank the Greek merchant ship Possidon, and on 21 September she damaged the British merchant ship Elmbank. Following these victories, on the 25th, U-47 entered the French port of Lorient, which was now under German control following the decisive Battle of France.

U-47's eighth patrol began on 14 October 1940 when she left her home port of Lorient. While her eighth patrol lasted ten days, she sank four enemy ships and damaged a further two in only two days. On 19 October, U-47 damaged the British ship Shirak and sank Uganda and Wandby, both of which were British registered. The next day, the U-boat damaged the British ship Athelmonarch, and sank La Estancia and Whitford Point. She returned to port three days later, on 23 October.

U-47 left her home port of Lorient on 3 November 1940 and moved out into the North Atlantic in search of Allied convoys. During her ninth patrol, she damaged three ships, Gonçalo Velho, Conch and Dunsley, and sank SS Ville d´Arlon. U-47 returned to Lorient for the last time on 6 December. On her return Kretschmer presented Adolf Hitler with a lifebelt from Conch which U-47 had damaged.

=== Disappearance ===
U-47 departed Lorient on her tenth and last patrol on 20 February 1941. She went missing on 7 March 1941 and was believed at the time to have been sunk by the British destroyer HMS Wolverine west of Ireland, when a submarine was attacked by Wolverine and HMS Verity. Postwar assessment showed that the boat attacked there was UA, which was only damaged. HMS Wolverine had made an earlier attack on a submarine at 0510 hrs, five minutes after U-47's last known torpedo attack on the whale factory ship Terje Viken. Nothing further was heard from U-47 after this time. To date, there is no official record of what happened to U-47, although a variety of other possibilities exist, including mines, a mechanical failure, a victim of her own torpedoes, or possibly a later attack by the corvettes HMS Camellia and HMS Arbutus. U-47 had a crew of 45 men during her last North Atlantic patrol in early 1941, all of whom were presumed dead.

=== Wolfpacks ===
U-47 took part in one wolfpack, namely: Prien (12–17 June 1940).

== Summary of raiding history ==
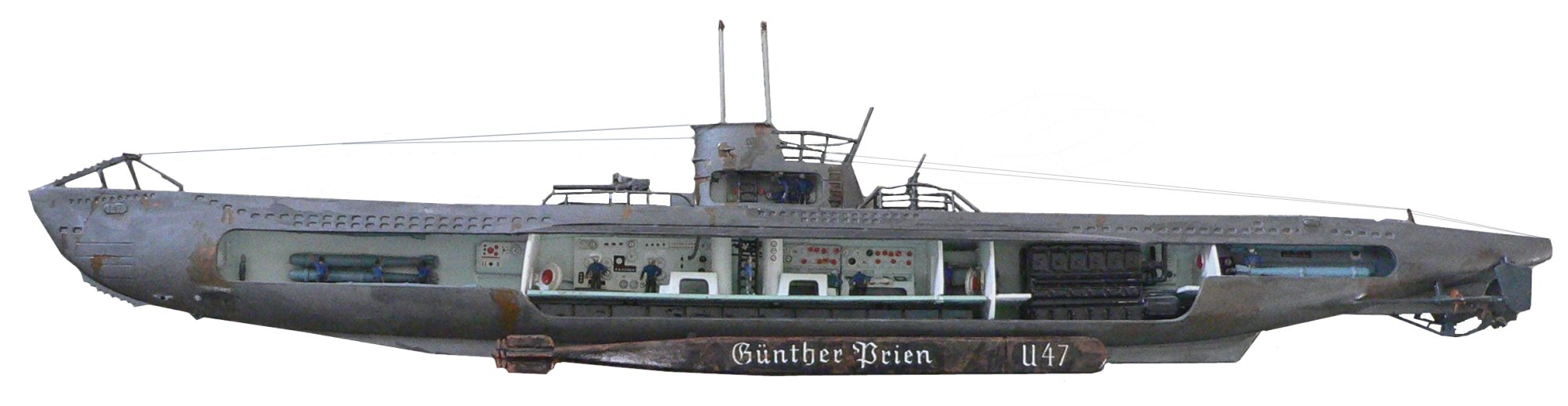
A cutaway model of U-47 viewed from the side

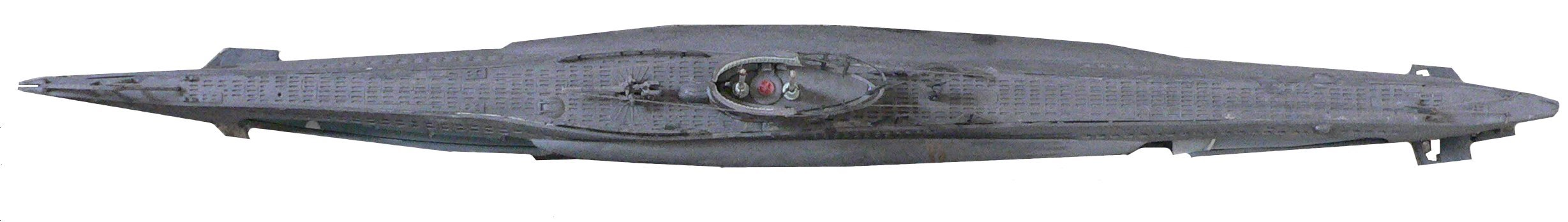
A view of U-47 from above

During her service in the Kriegsmarine, U-47 sank 30 commercial ships totalling 162,769 GRT and one warship of 29,150 tons; she also damaged eight commercial ships totalling 62,751 GRT and one warship of 10,035 tons.

Date	Ship	Nationality	Tonnage (Note: Merchant ship tonnages are in gross register tons. Military vessels are listed by tons displacement.)	Fate and location
5 September 1939	Bosnia	United Kingdom	2,407	Sunk at 45°29′N 09°45′W
6 September 1939	Rio Claro	United Kingdom	4,086	Sunk at 46°30′N 12°00′W
7 September 1939	Gartavon	United Kingdom	1,777	Sunk at 47°04′N 11°32′W
14 October 1939	HMS Royal Oak	Royal Navy	29,150	Sunk at 58°55′N 02°59′W
28 November 1939	HMS Norfolk	Royal Navy	10,035	Claimed hit: actually missed
5 December 1939	Navasota	United Kingdom	8,795	Sunk at 50°43′N 10°16′W
6 December 1939	Britta	Norway	6,214	Sunk at 49°19′N 05°35′W
7 December 1939	Tajandoen	Netherlands	8,159	Sunk at 49°09′N 04°51′W
25 March 1940	Britta	Denmark	1,146	Sunk at 60°00′N 04°19′W
14 June 1940	Balmoralwood	United Kingdom	5,834	Sunk at 50°19′N 10°28′W
21 June 1940	San Fernando	United Kingdom	13,056	Sunk at 50°20′N 10°24′W
24 June 1940	Cathrine	Panama	1,885	Sunk at 50°08′N 14°00′W
27 June 1940	Lenda	Norway	4,005	Sunk at 50°12′N 13°18′W
27 June 1940	Leticia	Netherlands	2,580	Sunk at 50°11′N 13°15′W
29 June 1940	Empire Toucan	United Kingdom	4,127	Sunk at 49°20′N 13°52′W
30 June 1940	Georgios Kyriakides	Greece	4,201	Sunk at 50°25′N 14°33′W
2 July 1940	Arandora Star	United Kingdom	15,501	Sunk at 55°20′N 10°33′W
2 September 1940	Ville de Mons	Belgium	7,463	Sunk at 58°20′N 12°00′W
4 September 1940	Titan	United Kingdom	9,035	Sunk at 58°14′N 15°50′W
7 September 1940	Neptunian	United Kingdom	5,155	Sunk at 58°27′N 17°17′W
7 September 1940	José de Larrinaga	United Kingdom	5,303	Sunk at 58°30′N 16°10′W
7 September 1940	Gro	Norway	4,211	Sunk at 58°30′N 16°10′W
9 September 1940	Possidon	Greece	3,840	Sunk at 56°43′N 09°16′W
21 September 1940	Elmbank	United Kingdom	5,156	Damaged at 55°20′N 22°30′W
19 October 1940	Uganda	United Kingdom	4,966	Sunk at 56°35′N 17°15′W
19 October 1940	Shirak	United Kingdom	6,023	Damaged at 57°00′N 16°53′W
19 October 1940	Wandby	United Kingdom	4,947	Sunk at 56°45′N 17°07′W
20 October 1940	La Estancia	United Kingdom	5,185	Sunk at 57°N 17°W
20 October 1940	Whitford Point	United Kingdom	5,026	Sunk at 56°38′N 16°00′W
20 October 1940	Athelmonarch	United Kingdom	8,995	Damaged at 56°45′N 15°58′W
8 November 1940	Gonçalo Velho	Portugal	1,595	Damaged at 52°30′N 17°30′W
2 December 1940	Ville d'Arlon	Belgium	7,555	Sunk at 55°00′N 18°30′W
2 December 1940	Conch	United Kingdom	8,376	Damaged at 55°40′N 19°00′W
2 December 1940	Dunsley	United Kingdom	3,862	Damaged at 54°41′N 18°41′W
26 February 1941	Kasongo	Belgium	5,254	Sunk at 55°50′N 14°20′W
26 February 1941	Diala	United Kingdom	8,106	Damaged at 55°50′N 14°00′W
26 February 1941	Rydboholm	Sweden	3,197	Sunk at 55°32′N 14°24′W
26 February 1941	Borgland	Norway	3,636	Sunk at 55°45′N 14°29′W
28 February 1941	Holmlea	United Kingdom	4,223	Sunk at 54°24′N 17°25′W
7 March 1941	Terje Viken	United Kingdom	20,638	Damaged at 60°00′N 12°50′W

== See also ==
- U 47 – Kapitänleutnant Prien, a 1958 film about Prien's command of U-47
- List of most successful German U-boats

== Bibliography ==
- Busch, Rainer; Röll, Hans-Joachim (1999). German U-boat commanders of World War II: A Biographical Dictionary. Translated by Brooks, Geoffrey. London, Annapolis, MD: Greenhill Books, Naval Institute Press. ISBN 1-55750-186-6.
- Busch, Rainer; Röll, Hans-Joachim (1999). Deutsche U-Boot-Verluste von September 1939 bis Mai 1945 [German U-boat losses from September 1939 to May 1945]. Der U-Boot-Krieg (in German). Vol. IV. Hamburg, Berlin, Bonn: Mittler. ISBN 3-8132-0514-2.
- Gröner, Erich; Jung, Dieter; Maass, Martin (1991). German Warships 1815–1945: U-boats and Mine Warfare Vessels. Vol. 2. Translated by Thomas, Keith; Magowan, Rachel. London: Conway Maritime Press. ISBN 0-85177-593-4.
- Kemp, Paul (1999). U-Boats Destroyed: German Submarine Losses in the World Wars. London: Arms & Armour. ISBN 1-85409-515-3.
- Martindale, Dougie (2018). Gunther Prien and U-47: The Bull of Scapa Flow. Annapolis, MD: Naval Institute Press. ISBN 978-1682473863.
