= German submarine U-17 (1935) =

German World War II submarine

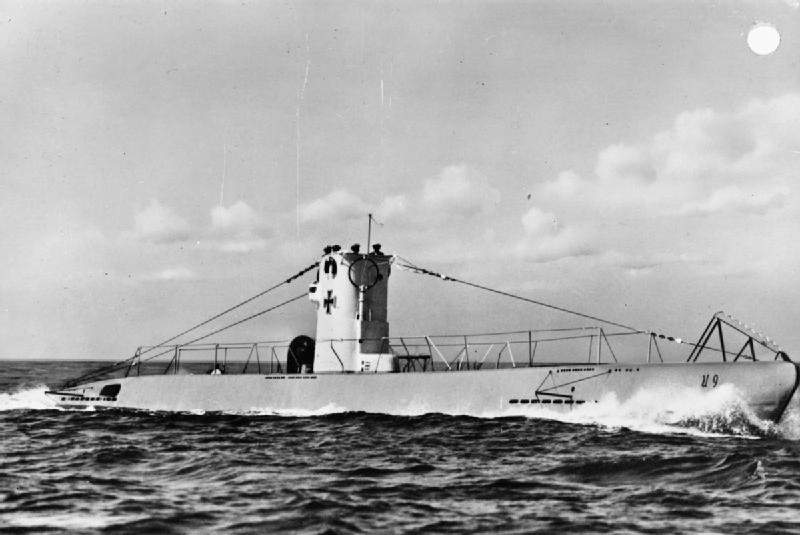
- U-9, a typical Type IIB boat

History

Nazi Germany
- Name: U-17
- Ordered: 2 February 1935
- Builder: Germaniawerft, Kiel
- Yard number: 547
- Laid down: 1 July 1935
- Launched: 14 November 1935
- Commissioned: 3 December 1935
- Fate: Scuttled, 5 May 1945 at Wilhelmshaven

General characteristics
- Class & type: Type IIB coastal submarine
- Displacement: 279 t (275 long tons) surfaced; 328 t (323 long tons) submerged
- Length: 42.70 m (140 ft 1 in) o/a; 27.80 m (91 ft 2 in) pressure hull
- Beam: 4.08 m (13 ft 5 in) (o/a); 4.00 m (13 ft 1 in) (pressure hull)
- Height: 8.60 m (28 ft 3 in)
- Draught: 3.90 m (12 ft 10 in)
- Installed power: 700 PS (510 kW; 690 bhp) (diesels); 410 PS (300 kW; 400 shp) (electric)
- Propulsion: 2 shafts; 2 × diesel engines; 2 × electric motors
- Speed: 13 knots (24 km/h; 15 mph) surfaced; 7 knots (13 km/h; 8.1 mph) submerged
- Range: 1,800 nmi (3,300 km; 2,100 mi) at 12 knots (22 km/h; 14 mph) surfaced; 35–43 nmi (65–80 km; 40–49 mi) at 4 knots (7.4 km/h; 4.6 mph) submerged
- Test depth: 80 m (260 ft)
- Complement: 3 officers, 22 men
- Armament: 3 × 53.3 cm (21 in) torpedo tubes; 5 × torpedoes or up to 12 TMA or 18 TMB mines; 1 × 2 cm (0.79 in) anti-aircraft gun

Service record
- Part of: 1st U-boat Flotilla; 1 December 1935 – 1 August 1939; 1 September – 31 October 1939; U-boat Training Flotilla; 1 November 1939 – 30 April 1940; U-boat Defense School; 1 May 1940 – 28 February 1943; 22nd U-boat Flotilla; 1 March 1943 – 6 February 1945
- Identification codes: M 25 322
- Commanders: Oblt.z.S. / Kptlt. Werner Fresdorf; 3 December 1935 – 1 November 1937; Oblt.z.S. / Kptlt. Heinz von Reiche; 2 November 1937 – 11 September 1939; Kptlt. Harald Jeppener-Haltenhoff; 11 September – 17 October 1939; Kptlt. Wolf-Harro Stiebler; 18 October 1939 – 5 January 1940; Kptlt. Udo Behrens; 6 January – 7 July 1940; Oblt.z.S. Herwig Collmann; 8 July 1940 – 4 January 1941; Kptlt. Wolfgang Schultze; 5 January – 15 October 1941; Otto Wollschläger; 2 – 14 October 1941; Oblt.z.S. Ernst Heydemann; 16 October 1941 – 31 May 1942; Walter Sitek; 1 June 1942 – 22 February 1943; Oblt.z.S.d.R Karl-Heinz Schmidt; 23 February 1943 – 25 May 1944; Oblt.z.S. Hans-Jürgen Bartsch; 26 May – 21 December 1944; Oblt.z.S. Friedrich Baumgärtel; 22 December 1944 – 6 February 1945
- Operations: 4 patrols: 1st patrol: a. 31 August – 8 September 1939; b. 9 – 10 September 1939; 2nd patrol: 29 January – 10 February 1940; 3rd patrol: a. 29 February – 7 March 1940; b. 27 March 1940; c. 5 – 6 April 1940; 4th patrol: 13 April – 2 May 1940
- Victories: 3 merchant ships sunk (1,825 GRT)

German submarine U-17 was a Type IIB U-boat of Nazi Germany's Kriegsmarine. It was built in Germaniawerft, Kiel, where it was laid down on 1 July 1935 and commissioned on 3 December 1935, under the command of Werner Fresdorf.

== Design ==
German Type IIB submarines were enlarged versions of the original Type IIs. U-17 had a displacement of 279 tonnes (275 long tons) when at the surface and 328 tonnes (323 long tons) while submerged. Officially, the standard tonnage was 250 long tons (254 t), however. The U-boat had a total length of 42.70 m (140 ft 1 in), a pressure hull length of 28.20 m (92 ft 6 in), a beam of 4.08 m (13 ft 5 in), a height of 8.60 m (28 ft 3 in), and a draught of 3.90 m (12 ft 10 in). The submarine was powered by two MWM RS 127 S four-stroke, six-cylinder diesel engines of 700 metric horsepower (510 kW; 690 shp) for cruising, two Siemens-Schuckert PG VV 322/36 double-acting electric motors producing a total of 460 metric horsepower (340 kW; 450 shp) for use while submerged. She had two shafts and two 0.85 m (3 ft) propellers. (All the photos only show one propeller) The boat was capable of operating at depths of up to 80–150 metres (260–490 ft).

The submarine had a maximum surface speed of 12 knots (22 km/h; 14 mph) and a maximum submerged speed of 7 knots (13 km/h; 8.1 mph). When submerged, the boat could operate for 35–42 nautical miles (65–78 km; 40–48 mi) at 4 knots (7.4 km/h; 4.6 mph); when surfaced, she could travel 3,800 nautical miles (7,000 km; 4,400 mi) at 8 knots (15 km/h; 9.2 mph). U-17 was fitted with three 53.3 cm (21 in) torpedo tubes at the bow, five torpedoes or up to twelve Type A torpedo mines, and a 2 cm (0.79 in) anti-aircraft gun. The boat had a complement of twentyfive.

== Service history ==
Its career consisted of four patrols, all served while under the 1st U-boat Flotilla where it sank three ships for a total of 1,825 gross register tons (GRT). Later in the war it served under the 22nd U-boat Flotilla as a training boat, including Oberleutnant zur See Walter Sitek as an instructor. Sitek had previously avoided imprisonment after the disabling and sinking of U-581 by HMS Westcott in February 1942. He swam 6 kilometres (3.7 mi) to Pico Island in the Azores, made his way through neutral Spain and returned to the Kriegsmarine to serve as an instructor on U-17, U-981, and U-3005.

== Fate ==
On 5 May 1945 U-17 was scuttled at Wilhelmshaven at the western entrance of the Raeder lock.

== Summary of raiding history ==
Date	Name	Nationality	Tonnage (GRT)	Fate
14 September 1939	Hawarden Castle	United Kingdom	210	Sunk (mine)
2 March 1940	Rijnstroom	Netherlands	695	Sunk
5 March 1940	Grutto	Netherlands	920	Sunk

== Bibliography ==
- Busch, Rainer; Röll, Hans-Joachim (1999). German U-boat commanders of World War II : a biographical dictionary. Translated by Brooks, Geoffrey. London, Annapolis, Md: Greenhill Books, Naval Institute Press. ISBN 1-55750-186-6.
- Busch, Rainer; Röll, Hans-Joachim (1999). Deutsche U-Boot-Verluste von September 1939 bis Mai 1945 [German U-boat losses from September 1939 to May 1945]. Der U-Boot-Krieg (in German). Vol. IV. Hamburg, Berlin, Bonn: Mittler. ISBN 3-8132-0514-2.
- Gröner, Erich; Jung, Dieter; Maass, Martin (1991). U-boats and Mine Warfare Vessels. German Warships 1815–1945. Vol. 2. Translated by Thomas, Keith; Magowan, Rachel. London: Conway Maritime Press. ISBN 0-85177-593-4.
