= Walter Simon (spy) =

German spy

Walter Simon was a World War II German spy. He successfully completed three missions in England. In 1939 he was arrested by MI5, spent three months in prison, then deported. In June 1940 he landed by U-boat in neutral Ireland on a naval intelligence mission but was captured that same day and sentenced to three years in jail. With the Battle of Britain about to begin following the fall of France, the arrival of a German spy on the Dingle Peninsula in June 1940 sparked enormous security concerns both in Ireland and the United Kingdom.

== Background ==
Walter Simon was trained at the Abwehr branch in Hamburg, who were responsible for subversive activities against the United Kingdom. Walters was known to British security officers, having completed three successful espionage missions in England.

He was arrested by MI5 in 1939, and spent three months in Wandsworth Prison, after being found guilty of illegal entry. He was subsequently deported back to Germany and warned never to return. While identified as a spy, he avoided harsher punishment because the British authorities could not prove it. Trained by Nikolaus Ritter, an Abwehr agent in Britain under the name "Dr. Rantzau", he refused to crack under close interrogation. MI5 returned all his notebooks containing coded information that he had amassed. He had collected information on British air defenses – material invaluable to Operation Sea Lion, the planned invasion of Britain.

The Abwehr decided to send him to Ireland to collect intelligence on the disposition of British naval ships.

== Capture ==
Walter Simon came ashore on the morning of 13 June 1940 near Dingle, Ireland from the German submarine U-38. He was 58 years of age, carrying a large amount of cash and a new suitcase radio transmitter.

He gave his name as Karl Anderson, but he was quickly identified as Walter Simon when the Gardaí checked his fingerprints with the British. Walter Simon's true identity was established. On 8 July 1940 he was charged and pleaded guilty to illegal entry. He was sentenced to three years in jail at the Central Criminal Court on 8 July 1940.

Simon's period as an agent in Ireland lasted 26 days, almost all of those in police custody. His belongings included $2,000 and some English money.
