= Convoy HX 47 =

Convoy HX.47
- Part of World War II
| Date | 14/15 June 1940 |
| Location | Atlantic Ocean |
| Result | German tactical victory |

Belligerents
| (Nazi Germany) Germany | United Kingdom |

Commanders and leaders
| V.Adm. Karl Dönitz | Adm. B S Thesiger |

Strength
| 2 U-boats | 58 merchant ships 2 escorts |

Casualties and losses
| | 3 ships sunk |

Convoy HX 47 was a North Atlantic convoy of the HX series which ran during the battle of the Atlantic in World War II. It was the 47th of the numbered series of merchant convoys run by the Allies from Halifax to Liverpool. The convoy was attacked by German U-boats and lost three of its 58 ships.

== Background ==
HX 47 was formed of two sections sailing from the Americas. The main body, of 37 ships departed Halifax on 2 June 1940 with ships gathered from the US eastern seaboard; it was led by convoy commodore Adm. BS Thesiger RN in the steamship Pacific Pioneer. It was accompanied by its ocean escort, the armed merchant cruiser HMS Esperance Bay, and a local escort, a Royal Canadian Navy destroyer. Two ships dropped out early in the voyage; Randsfjord was damaged in collision with a Greek steamer and returned for repairs, and another returned to port for degaussing.

On 8 June the convoy was joined by BHX 47, 21 ships from the Caribbean and South America, that had gathered at Bermuda, departing there on 31 May escorted by the armed merchant cruiser HMS Ascania and a local escort.

Ranged against HX 47 were U-boats of the German Navy's U-boat Arm (UBW), on patrol in Britain's sea lanes. The UBW had just two U-boats in Southwest Approaches, U-38 and U-47, with another, U-32, further west.

== Action ==
On 14 June HX 47’s Western Approaches escort arrived. These were the sloops HMS Sandwich, from escorting the outbound convoy OA 164, and HMS Fowey from port following a refit. During the crossing three ships had dropped out of convoy; of these, Balmoralwood, was sighted on 14 June by U-47 and sunk, 70 miles from Cape Clear Island.

That evening U-38 had attacked the Greek freighter Mount Myrto, on independent passage; sighting HX 47 the U-boat left the freighter in a sinking condition and stalked the convoy. Attacking after midnight of 14/15 June U-38 sank two ships, the tanker Italia and the freighter Erik Boye. The U-boat escaped and HX 47 continued without further loss.

The main body of the convoy reached Liverpool on 17 June.

== Conclusion ==
Of the 58 ships that set out, two turned back and three were sunk. 53 ships made a safe and timely arrival. HX 47 was one of two trans-Atlantic convoys attacked during June, the other, HX 49, also losing three ships. During the month as a whole the UBW sank 63 ships in the Atlantic; most of these were unescorted vessels sailing independently. June 1940 was the beginning of a marked increase in successes by the U-boat Arm, referred to by them as "The Happy Time".

== Ships in the convoy ==
=== Merchant ships ===
Convoy information is from Arnold Hague's Convoyweb

Merchant ships
| Name | Flag | Tonnage (GRT) | Notes |
|---|---|---|---|
| Aegeon (1919) | Greece | 5,285 | Aluminium and pulp |
| Andreas (1919) | Greece | 6,566 | Wheat |
| Anna Mazaraki (1913) | Greece | 5,411 | Grain |
| Annavore (1921) | Norway | 3,324 | Copper and General Cargo |
| Argos Hill (1922) | United Kingdom | 7,178 | Steel |
| Ashby (1927) | United Kingdom | 4,868 | Grain |
| Askeladden (1920) | Norway | 2,496 | Pitprops; Diverted to Portland, Maine for degaussing |
| Balmoralwood (1937) | United Kingdom | 5,834 | Wheat and 4 aircraft (deck cargo); Straggled 6 June; Sunk by U-47: 41 survivors on 14 June |
| Beaverbrae (1928) | United Kingdom | 9,956 | General cargo |
| Beaverhill (1928) | United Kingdom | 10,041 | General cargo |
| Blairspey (1929) | United Kingdom | 4,155 | Steel and timber |
| Boston City (1920) | United Kingdom | 2,870 | General cargo |
| Briarwood (1930) | United Kingdom | 4,019 | Pitprops |
| British Captain (1923) | United Kingdom | 6,968 | Petrol |
| British Faith (1928) | United Kingdom | 6,955 | Benzine |
| British Prince (1935) | United Kingdom | 4,879 | General cargo |
| Cairnvalona (1918) | United Kingdom | 4,929 | General cargo Vice-commodore: Adm Sir A J Davies KBE CB |
| Capsa (1931) | United Kingdom | 8,229 | Crude oil |
| Clydebank (1925) | United Kingdom | 5,156 | Steel and coke |
| Comedian (1929) | United Kingdom | 5,122 | Cotton and lumber |
| Diplomat (1921) | United Kingdom | 8,240 | General cargo |
| Dornach (1939) | United Kingdom | 5,186 | Wheat |
| Egda (1939) | Norway | 10,050 | Petrol |
| El Aleto (1927) | United Kingdom | 7,203 | Crude oil |
| Elax (1927) | United Kingdom | 7,403 | Fuel oil |
| Erik Boye (1924) | Canada | 2,238 | Grain; Sunk by U-38: 22 survivors |
| F J Wolfe (1932) | Panama | 12,190 | Crude oil |
| Ferncastle (1936) | Norway | 9,940 | Fuel oil |
| Georgios G (1918) | Greece | 4,289 | General cargo |
| Georgios Potamianos (1913) | Greece | 4,044 | General cargo |
| Germanic (1936) | United Kingdom | 5,352 | Grain |
| Harborough (1932) | United Kingdom | 5,415 | Grain |
| Hartbridge (1927) | United Kingdom | 5,080 | Wheat |
| Hellen (1921) | Norway | 5,289 | Scrap iron |
| Hoyanger (1926) | Norway | 4,624 | Pulp and lumber |
| Italia (1939) | Norway | 9,973 | 13,000 tons aviation spirit Sunk by U-38: 19 dead, 16 survivors |
| Kenbane Head (1919) | United Kingdom | 5,225 | General cargo |
| Loke (1915) | Norway | 2,421 | Copper |
| Manchester Citizen (1925) | United Kingdom | 5,343 | General cargo |
| Masunda (1929) | United Kingdom | 5,250 | Iron ore |
| Nailsea Manor (1937) | United Kingdom | 4,926 | Grain |
| Northumberland (1915) | United Kingdom | 11,558 | General cargo |
| Octavian (1938) | Norway | 1,345 | Wood pulp |
| Pacific Pioneer (1928) | United Kingdom | 6,734 | General cargo Convoy Commodore: Adm Sir B S Thesiger KBE CB CMG |
| Randsfjord (1937) | Norway | 3,999 | Wheat and general cargo Collision with Georgios Potamianos, returned to port |
| Regent Panther (1937) | United Kingdom | 9,556 | Petrol |
| Saimaa (1922) | Finland | 2,001 | General cargo |
| Salacia (1937) | United Kingdom | 5,495 | Lumber |
| San Adolfo (1935) | United Kingdom | 7,365 | Fuel Furnace Oil (FFO) |
| Saturnus (1940) | Sweden | 9,965 | Petrol |
| Southgate (1926) | United Kingdom | 4,862 | Steel and timber |
| Storanger (1930) | Norway | 9,223 | Fuel oil |
| Temple Inn (1940) | United Kingdom | 5,218 | Sugar |
| Theodoros Coumantaros (1917) | Greece | 5,709 | Sugar; straggled 11 June |
| Thiara (1939) | United Kingdom | 10,364 | Fuel and lub oil |
| Ulysses (1918) | Netherlands | 2,666 | General cargo |
| Vinemoor (1924) | United Kingdom | 4,359 | Wheat and lumber |
| Zurichmoor (1925) | United Kingdom | 4,455 | Steel and timber; straggled 6 June |

=== Escort ===
Escort information is from Arnold Hague's Convoyweb

Escorts
| Name | Flag | Ship Type | Notes |
|---|---|---|---|
| HMS Ascania | Royal Navy | Armed merchant cruiser | Ocean Escort: 31 May-8 June |
| HMS Esperance Bay | Royal Navy | Armed merchant cruiser | Ocean Escort: 2–15 June |
| HMS Fowey | Royal Navy | Shoreham-class sloop | Western Approaches Escort: 14–17 June |
| HMS Penzance | Royal Navy | Hastings-class sloop | Bermuda Local Escort: 31 May - ? |
| HMCS Saguenay | Royal Canadian Navy | Canadian River-class destroyer | Halifax Local Escort: 2–3 June |
| HMS Sandwich | Royal Navy | Bridgewater-class sloop | Western Approaches Escort: 14–17 June |

== Axis forces ==
U-boat information is from Guðmundur Helgason's uboat.net

| Number | Type | Navy | Contact date | Notes |
|---|---|---|---|---|
| U-38 | IXA | Kriegsmarine | 14 June 1940 | sank Italia, Erik Boye |
| U-47 | VIIB | Kriegsmarine | no contact | sank straggler Balmoralwood 14 June 1940 |

== Bibliography ==
- Blair, Clay (1996) Hitler's U-boat War Vol I Cassell ISBN 0-304-35260-8
- Hague, Arnold (2000). The Allied Convoy System 1939–1945. ISBN 1-86176-147-3.
- Edwards, Bernard (1996). Dönitz and the Wolf Packs - The U-boats at War. Cassell Military Classics. ISBN 0-304-35203-9.
- Rohwer, J; Hummelchen, G (1992). Chronology of the War at Sea 1939–1945. Naval Institute Press. ISBN 1-55750-105-X.
- Tarrant, VE (1989) The U-boat Offensive: 1914-1945. Arms & Armour ISBN 0-85368-928-8
