= Heinrich Liebe =

German naval officer

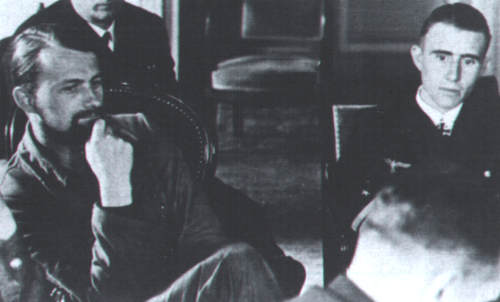
- Liebe (right)
- Military career
- Allegiance: Nazi Germany
- Branch: Kriegsmarine
- Rank: Fregattenkapitan
- Conflicts: Battle of the Atlantic

Heinrich Liebe (29 January 1908 – 27 July 1997) was a German naval officer during World War II. He served as a U-boat commander. Liebe was credited with sinking of 34 ships for a total of 187,267 gross register tons (GRT).

== Awards ==
- Wehrmacht Long Service Award 4th Class (2 October 1936)
- Olympic Games Decoration (20 April 1937)
- Iron Cross (1939) 2nd Class (8 October 1939) & 1st Class (6 April 1940)
- U-boat War Badge (1939) (16 December 1939)
- Knight's Cross of the Iron Cross with Oak Leaves
  - Knight's Cross on 14 August 1940 as Kapitänleutnant and commander of U-38
  - 13th Oak Leaves on 10 June 1941 as Kapitänleutnant and commander of U-38
- Italian War Cross with Swords (2 December 1941)
- War Merit Cross 2nd Class with Swords (3 September 1944)
