= List of shipwrecks in June 1940 =

The following ships were sunk, foundered, grounded, or otherwise lost during June 1940.

== 1 June ==
List of shipwrecks: 1 June 1940
Ship	State	Description
Aidee	United Kingdom	World War II: Operation Dynamo: The 144 GRT Thames barge was damaged by enemy action and was abandoned between Dunkirk, Nord, France, and De Panne, West Flanders, Belgium. Her crew were rescued.
Amulree	United Kingdom	World War II: Operation Dynamo: The yacht collided with HMS Vimy (Royal Navy) in the Strait of Dover and sank.
HMT Argyllshire	Royal Navy	World War II: Operation Dynamo: The 540 GRT naval trawler was torpedoed and sunk in the North Sea off Dunkirk by S 34 (Kriegsmarine). Five survivors were rescued by HMT Malabar (Royal Navy).
HMS Astronomer	Royal Navy	World War II: The 8,401 GRT boom defence vessel travelling across the Moray Firth from Rosyth for Scapa Flow with naval stores, was torpedoed and sunk in the North Sea off the north coast of Aberdeenshire (58°01′N 2°12′W) by U-58 (Kriegsmarine) with the loss of four of her 105 crew. Survivors were rescued by HMT Leicester City and HMT Stoke City (both Royal Navy).
Barbara Jean	United Kingdom	World War II: Operation Dynamo: The Thames barge was damaged by enemy action at Dunkirk and was abandoned. Three of her crew were rescued.
HMS Basilisk	Royal Navy	World War II: Operation Dynamo: The B-class destroyer was bombed and damaged in the North Sea off De Panne by Junkers Ju 87 aircraft of the Luftwaffe. She was scuttled at 51°08′N 02°35′E by HMS Whitehall (Royal Navy). Seven of her 138 crew were killed. Seventy-seven survivors were rescued by the fishing trawler Le Jolie Mascotte (France), and 54 by HMS Whitehall.
HMS Brighton Queen	Royal Navy	World War II: Operation Dynamo: The 807 GRT naval minesweeper, former paddle steamer Gwalia, was bombed and sunk in the North Sea off Dunkirk by the Luftwaffe dive bombers. Survivors were rescued by HMS Saltash (Royal Navy).
AD 48 Denis Papin	French Navy	World War II: Operation Dynamo: The 333 GRT auxiliary minesweeper was bombed and sunk in the North Sea off Dunkirk by Junkers Ju 87 aircraft of the Luftwaffe.
Doris	United Kingdom	World War II: Operation Dynamo: The 83 GRT Thames barge struck a mine and sank in the North Sea 3 nautical miles (5.6 km) off Dunkirk.
Duchess	United Kingdom	World War II: Operation Dynamo: The 72 GRT Thames barge struck a mine and sank in the North Sea 3 nautical miles (5.6 km) east of Dunkirk. Her crew were rescued.
Elbe	Belgium	World War II: Operation Dynamo: The tug (150 GRT, 1905) was bombed and sunk at Dunkirk by Luftwaffe aircraft.She was subsequently salvaged by the Germans.
Ethel Everard	United Kingdom	World War II: Operation Dynamo: The 158 GRT Thames barge was damaged by enemy action and abandoned at Dunkirk or De Panne.
HMT Evelyn Rose	Royal Navy	World War II: Operation Dynamo: The Mersey-class trawler struck a submerged wreck after leaving Dunkirk losing a prop blade. She was badly damaged by German aircraft later the same day and was beached at Ramsgate to prevent sinking. She was refloated and taken to Tilbury for repairs. Returned to service shortly thereafter as a patrol vessel.
Fair Breeze	United Kingdom	World War II: Operation Dynamo: The 92 GRT naval drifter struck a submerged wreck in the North Sea at Dunkirk and sank.
Foudroyant	French Navy	World War II: Operation Dynamo: The L'Adroit-class destroyer was bombed and sunk in the English Channel by Luftwaffe aircraft. One hundred and fifty survivors rescued by the fishing trawler Bernadette and motor yacht Naiad Errant (both France), and the naval trawler "HMT Gava" (Royal Navy).
HMS Havant	Royal Navy	World War II: Operation Dynamo: The H-class destroyer was bombed and damaged in the English Channel by Junkers Ju 87 aircraft of the Luftwaffe. She was subsequently scuttled by HMS Saltash (Royal Navy). Thirty-three people were killed.
Hertha Johanne	Germany	The auxiliary schooner sank in the Baltic Sea south of Falster, Denmark.
Ioanna	Greece	World War II: Convoy HG 32F: The cargo ship (950 GRT) straggled behind the convoy. She was stopped and then torpedoed and sunk in the Atlantic Ocean (43°09′N 11°55′W) 120 nautical miles (220 km) west of Cape Finisterre, Spain, by U-37 (Kriegsmarine). Her entire crew was rescued by Cabo Razo (Spain).
HMT Jacinta	Royal Navy	Operation Dynamo: The 289 GRT naval trawler ran onto the submerged wreck of Merl (Flag unknown) 2 nautical miles (3.7 km) south of the North Goodwin Lightship and became stuck. Refloated later by a tugboat after 150 troops were taken off. An hour later found abandoned and adrift. Anchored, towed the next day to Ramsgate for repairs. Returned to service shortly thereafter.
HMS Keith	Royal Navy	World War II: Operation Dynamo: The B-class destroyer was bombed and sunk in the North Sea off De Panne by Luftwaffe aircraft with the loss of 36 of her 166 crew. Survivors were rescued by Hilda (Netherlands), HMS Salamander and HMS St Abbs (both Royal Navy), Servia, and Vincia (both United Kingdom).
Lady Rosebery	United Kingdom	World War II: Operation Dynamo: The Thames barge struck a mine and sank in the North Sea 3 nautical miles (5.6 km) east of Dunkirk with the loss of one of her crew.
AD 79 La Mousaillon	French Navy	World War II: Operation Dynamo: The 188 GRT auxiliary minesweeper was bombed and sunk in the North Sea off Dunkirk by Junkers Ju 87 aircraft of the Luftwaffe.
Lark	United Kingdom	World War II: Operation Dynamo: The Thames barge was beached and abandoned at Dunkirk.
HMT Lord Cavan	Royal Navy	World War II: Operation Dynamo: The drifter was shelled and sunk in the North Sea at Dunkirk by German artillery. Her crew were rescued by a destroyer.
Marie Johannes	Germany	World War II: The schooner struck a mine and sank off Gedser, Denmark.
HMS Mosquito	Royal Navy	World War II: Operation Dynamo: The Dragonfly-class gunboat was bombed and damaged in the North Sea off Dunkirk by Luftwaffe aircraft. She was scuttled on 3 June by HMS Locust (Royal Navy).
HMS Orford	Royal Navy	World War II: The troopship was bombed and damaged by Luftwaffe aircraft in the Mediterranean Sea off Marseille, Bouches-du-Rhône, France, whilst evacuating Allied troops and was beached. Fourteen people were lost in the bombing. The wreck was broken up for scrap at Savona, Italy, in 1947.
Prague	United Kingdom	World War II: The cargo ship was bombed and damaged in the North Sea 13 nautical miles (24 km) off North Foreland, Kent. She was beached off Sandwich, Kent. She was refloated on 6 June and anchored in The Downs, the United Kingdom.
Renown	United Kingdom	World War II: Operation Dynamo: The fishing boat struck a mine and sank in the North Sea off the Sandettie Lightship ( Trinity House).
Royalty	United Kingdom	World War II: Operation Dynamo: The Thames barge was beached and abandoned at Malo-les-Bains, Nord.
Scotia	United Kingdom	World War II: Operation Dynamo: The passenger ship was bombed and sunk in the North Sea off Dunkirk (51°07′N 2°10′E) by Luftwaffe aircraft with the loss of 28 crew and at least 200 French soldiers. Survivors were rescued by HMS Esk, HMT Fisher boy, HMT Fidget, and HMT Jaketa (all Royal Navy).
Sivert Nielsen	Norway	World War II: The coaster was bombed and sunk in the Vestfjorden, Norway by Luftwaffe aircraft with the loss of a crew member.
HMS Skipjack	Royal Navy	World War II: Operation Dynamo: The Halcyon-class minesweeper was bombed and sunk off De Panne by Luftwaffe aircraft with the loss of most of the 275 people on board.
Slasher	United Kingdom	World War II: The fishing trawler was bombed and sunk in the North Sea (54°35′N 1°16′E) by Luftwaffe aircraft with the loss of one of her nine crew.
HMS St. Abbs	Royal Navy	World War II: Operation Dynamo: The Saint-class tug was bombed and sunk in the North Sea off Dunkirk (51°04′N 2°27′E) by Luftwaffe aircraft. Nineteen crew and 86 Royal Army and Navy passengers, survivors of HMS Keith, were killed, 30 were rescued.
HMT St. Achilleus	Royal Navy	World War II: Operation Dynamo: The 484 GRT naval trawler struck a mine and sank in the North Sea off De Panne.
HMS St. Fagan	Royal Navy	World War II: Operation Dynamo: The Saint-class tug was bombed and sunk in the North Sea off Dunkirk by Luftwaffe aircraft. Twenty-five of her 32 crew were killed.
HMT Stella Dorado	Royal Navy	World War II: Operation Dynamo: The 416 GRT naval trawler was torpedoed and sunk off Dunkirk by S 34 (Kriegsmarine) with the loss of all hands.
AD 76 Venus	French Navy	World War II: Operation Dynamo: The 178 GRT auxiliary minesweeper was bombed and sunk in the North Sea at Gravelines, Nord, by Junkers Ju 87 aircraft of the Luftwaffe.
HMS X 95	Royal Navy	The X-class lighter was wrecked on this date.

== 2 June ==
List of shipwrecks: 2 June 1940
Ship	State	Description
Anna Leopold	Belgium	World War II: Operation Dynamo: The fishing vessel was sunk in the North Sea at Dunkirk, Nord, France, by enemy action.
HMT Blackburn Rovers	Royal Navy	World War II: Operation Dynamo: The 422 GRT naval trawler struck a mine and sank in the North Sea 24 nautical miles (44 km) east by south of the North Foreland, Kent. Eight crew were lost. Her survivors were ultimately rescued by HMT Saon (Royal Navy).
Chella	France	World War II: The ocean liner was bombed and set on fire at Marseille, Bouches-du-Rhône, by Luftwaffe aircraft. There were ten dead and missing, and six wounded. Towed outside port because of its load of ammunition, she was later shelled and sunk in shallow waters by the auxiliary cruiser Cyrnos (French Navy). Her wreck remained visible; it was scrapped in situ in 1954.
Emma	France	The fishing trawler collided with Hebe (Finland) and sank in the North Sea off the South Foreland Lighthouse, Kent.
Florida	Panama	The cargo ship ran aground at Cape Spartel, Morocco and was declared a constructive total loss.
Fossa	United Kingdom	World War II: Operation Dynamo: The tug ran aground at Dunkirk and was abandoned. She was later salvaged by the Germans and entered service with them.
Getuigt vor Christus	Belgium	World War II: Operation Dynamo: The fishing vessel was sunk in the North Sea at Dunkirk by a Kriegsmarine patrol boat.
Greynight	United Kingdom	World War II: The fishing vessel was bombed and sunk in the North Sea (54°40′N 1°30′E) by Luftwaffe aircraft with the loss of one of her eight crew.
Jane Holland	United Kingdom	World War II: Operation Dynamo: The lifeboat was rammed by a motor torpedo boat and strafed by Luftwaffe aircraft off Dunkirk and was abandoned by her crew. She was discovered in the English Channel on 4 June and was towed in to Dover, Kent in a waterlogged condition. Repairs took ten months to complete.
Maria Toft	Denmark	World War II: The cargo ship was bombed and set afire at Dunkirk by Luftwaffe aircraft. She was still burning on 6 June when the Germans tried to extinguish the fire, putting so much water in her that she capsized and sank on 30 June. She was later salvaged, repaired and returned to service under German control.
Max	France	World War II: Operation Dynamo: The tug was bombed and set on fire at Dunkirk by Luftwaffe aircraft on 29 May. The vessel was sunk as a blockship on 2 June. Later raised and broken up.
HMHS Paris	Royal Navy	World War II: Operation Dynamo: The hospital ship was bombed and severely damaged in the North Sea off Dunkirk (51°11′N 2°07′E) by Luftwaffe aircraft. She was taken under tow but sank the next day. Two of her crew were killed.
Onze Lieve Vrouw van Vlaanderen	Belgium	World War II: Operation Dynamo: The fishing vessel was sunk in the North Sea at Dunkirk by enemy action.
Polycarp	United Kingdom	World War II: The cargo ship (3,577 GRT) on a trip from Pará for Liverpool, was torpedoed and sunk in the English Channel 20 nautical miles (37 km) south of Land's End, Cornwall (49°19′N 5°35′W) by U-101 (Kriegsmarine). All 43 crew were rescued by Espiguette (France).
HMT Westella	Royal Navy	World War II: Operation Dynamo: The 413 GRT naval trawler struck a mine in the North Sea whilst rescuing survivors from HMT Blackburn Rovers (Royal Navy) and sank. Her crew were rescued by HMT Saon (Royal Navy) with the survivors from Blackburn Rovers, but one crew of HMT Westella died of his wounds the next day.
Winga	United Kingdom	The cargo ship collided with Jernland (Norway) and sank in the North Sea four nautical miles (7.4 km; 4.6 mi) off Hartlepool, Co Durham (54°42′54″N 1°02′06″W) with the loss of fourteen of her 22 crew.

== 3 June ==
List of shipwrecks: 3 June 1940
Ship	State	Description
Edvard Nissen	United Kingdom	World War II: Operation Dynamo: The cargo ship was sunk as a blockship at Dunkirk, Nord, France.
Holland	Denmark	World War II: Operation Dynamo: The cargo ship was sunk in a collision off Dunkirk, where she was scheduled to be sunk as a blockship. There were no casualties.
HMT Ocean Lassie	Royal Navy	World War II: The requisitioned steam drifter (248 GRT) struck a mine and sank in the North Sea off Felixtowe, Suffolk, with the loss of six of her nine crew.
Perrakkis L. Cambanis	Greece	World War II: The cargo ship was scuttled at Dieppe, Seine-Inférieure, France due to bomb damage suffered in May. She was later salvaged by the Germans, repaired and entered service as Herta Engeline Fritzen.
Purfina	France	World War II: The 603 GRT coastal tanker struck a mine as she was entering Le Havre roadstead, and sank with the loss of eleven lives. There were ten survivors.
Snabb	Finland	World War II: The cargo ship (2,317 GRT) on a passage from Glasgow for Dakar in ballast, was shelled and sunk in the Atlantic Ocean 300 nautical miles (560 km) off Cape Finisterre, Spain (45°51′N 14°15′W), by U-37 (Kriegsmarine) with the loss of a crew member. The 20 survivors were rescued by Kyriakoula (Greece).
Westcove	United Kingdom	World War II: Operation Dynamo: The cargo ship was sunk as a blockship at Dunkirk.

== 4 June ==
List of shipwrecks: 4 June 1940
Ship	State	Description
Emile Deschamps	French Navy	World War II: Operation Dynamo: The auxiliary minesweeper struck a mine and sank in the North Sea 5 nautical miles (9.3 km) east north east of Foreness Point, Kent, United Kingdom (51°24′00″N 1°19′24″E). Of about 500 people aboard, around 100 survivors were rescued by HMS Albury (Royal Navy), Marie Anne, and Sainte Elisabeth (both French Navy).
Gourko	United Kingdom	World War II: Operation Dynamo: The passenger ship struck a mine and sank in the North Sea off Dunkirk, Nord, France while on the way to be scuttled as a blockship. A crew member was lost; there were eighteen survivors.
Marechal Foch	France	World War II: Operation Dynamo: The fishing trawler collided with HMS Leda (Royal Navy) and sank in the North Sea off Dunkirk. There were 300 men aboard, some sources say there were 150 survivors.
Moyle	United Kingdom	World War II: Operation Dynamo: The cargo ship was scuttled as a blockship at Dunkirk.
Pacifico	United Kingdom	World War II: Operation Dynamo: The cargo ship was scuttled as a blockship at Dunkirk.
River Humber	United Kingdom	The cargo ship collided with HMS Folkestone (Royal Navy) and sank in the Irish Sea north of Holyhead, Anglesey, with the loss of four of her crew.

== 5 June ==
List of shipwrecks: 5 June 1940
Ship	State	Description
Capable	United Kingdom	World War II: The coaster struck a mine and sank in the English Channel east of the Isle of Wight with the loss of all seven people on board.
M-11	Kriegsmarine	World War II: The minesweeper struck a mine off Jæderen, Norway and sank during the night of 5/6 June. Five crewmen were killed and eleven wounded.
Palime	Germany	World War II: The 2,863 GRT cargo ship struck a mine, laid by Narwhal (Royal Navy) in the North Sea off Stavanger, Norway, and was beached. She was later declared a constructive total loss. Her crew were rescued.
Skandia	Denmark	World War II: The auxiliary schooner struck a mine and sank in the Kattegat (57°33′N 11°35′E) with the loss of six lives.
Stancor	United Kingdom	World War II: The coaster (798 GRT) on a trip from Reykjavik for Fleetwood with a cargo of fish, was torpedoed, shelled and sunk in the Atlantic Ocean west of the Outer Hebrides (58°48′N 8°45′W) by U-48 (Kriegsmarine). Nine of her nineteen crew were rescued by the fishing trawler Kinaldie (United Kingdom), the rest reached land in their lifeboat.
Sweep II	United Kingdom	World War II: The 145 GRT sludge vessel on a trip from Ipswich to spoil grounds, struck a magnetic mine and sank in the North Sea east of Harwich, Essex, with the loss of two crew.

== 6 June ==
List of shipwrecks: 6 June 1940
Ship	State	Description
HMS Carinthia	Royal Navy	World War II: The armed merchant cruiser (20,277 GRT) was torpedoed and damaged west of Galway Bay, Ireland (53°13′N 10°40′W) by U-46 (Kriegsmarine). Four crew were killed. She sank under tow the next day about 34 miles east of Bloody Foreland (55°12′N 9°30′W).
Harcalo	United Kingdom	World War II: The cargo ship struck a mine in the North Sea (51°19′00″N 1°32′25″E) and was beached off Ramsgate, Kent with the loss of three of her crew. She broke in two and was declared a total loss. The wreck was dispersed by explosives.
Lapwing	United Kingdom	World War II: The fishing trawler struck a mine in the North Sea (54°00′N 1°10′E) and sank. Her crew were rescued.

== 7 June ==
List of shipwrecks: 7 June 1940
Ship	State	Description
Eros	United Kingdom	World War II: The cargo ship was torpedoed and damaged in the Atlantic Ocean 15 nautical miles (28 km; 17 mi) off Tory Island, County Donegal, Ireland by U-48 (Kriegsmarine). She was abandoned by her 62 crew, who were rescued by HMT Paynter (Royal Navy). Eros was taken in tow by HMS Berkeley (Royal Navy) and beached on Tory Island. She was later repaired and returned to service.
Frances Massey	United Kingdom	World War II: The cargo ship was torpedoed and sunk in the Atlantic Ocean 15 nautical miles (28 km) off Tory Island (55°33′N 8°26′W) by U-48 (Kriegsmarine) with the loss of 34 of her 35 crew. The survivor was rescued by HMS Volunteer (Royal Navy).
Portugal	Portugal	The replica of a 16th century Indiaman sank on launch at Mestre Manuel Maria Bolais Mónica shipyard at Gafanha da Nazaré, Portugal. Later refloated.
Salomé	France	The tanker sank at Dunkirk, Nord, France. She was subsequently salvaged by the Germans and entered service as Breisgau.

== 8 June ==
For the scuttling of HMS Mashobra on this day, see the entry for 25 May 1940.
For the scuttling of RFA Oleander on this day, see the entry for 26 May 1940.

List of shipwrecks: 8 June 1940
Ship	State	Description
HMS Acasta	Royal Navy	World War II: Operation Juno: The A-class destroyer was shelled and sunk in the Norwegian Sea by Gneisenau and Scharnhorst (both Kriegsmarine) with the loss of 193 of her 194 crew.
HMS Ardent	Royal Navy	World War II: Operation Juno: The A-class destroyer was shelled and sunk in the Norwegian Sea by Gneisenau and Scharnhorst (both Kriegsmarine) with the loss of 137 of her 138 crew.
Dulwich	United Kingdom	The cargo ship ran aground in the Seine and was scuttled. She was subsequently repaired and entered German service.
HMS Glorious	Royal Navy	World War II: Operation Juno: The aircraft carrier was shelled and sunk in the Norwegian Sea by Gneisenau and Scharnhorst (both Kriegsmarine) with the loss of 1,207 of her 1,247 crew.
Hardingham	United Kingdom	World War II: The cargo ship struck a mine and sank in the North Sea north north east of Margate, Kent (51°59′05″N 1°40′04″E) with the loss of two of her 38 crew. The wreck was subsequently dispersed by explosives.
HMT Juniper	Royal Navy	World War II: Operation Juno: The Tree-class trawler was shelled and sunk in the Norwegian Sea off Jan Mayen, Norway (67°20′N 4°10′E) by Admiral Hipper (Kriegsmarine) and four German destroyers. Only four crew survived.
Oilpioneer	United Kingdom	World War II: Operation Juno: The tanker was shelled and sunk in the Norwegian Sea off Jan Mayen (67°20′N 4°10′E) by Admiral Hipper (Kriegsmarine) and four German destroyers with the loss of twenty of her 45 crew. Survivors were taken as prisoners of war.
HMS Orama	Royal Navy	World War II: Operation Juno: The troopship was shelled and sunk in the Norwegian Sea (67°44′N 3°52′E) by Admiral Hipper (Kriegsmarine) and four German destroyers with the loss of nineteen of her 299 crew. Survivors were rescued by Admiral Hipper and other Kriegsmarine vessels.

== 9 June ==
List of shipwrecks: 9 June 1940
Ship	State	Description
Amythyste	France	World War II: The cargo ship was scuttled at Dieppe, Seine-Inférieure.
Angiulin	Italy	World War II: The coaster (873 GRT) on a trip from Licata for Naples struck an Italian mine off Cape Granitola, Sicily and sank with the loss of all 12 hands.
Ariadne	Norway	World War II: The passenger ship was bombed and sunk in the Norwegian Sea (67°55′N 2°10′E) by Luftwaffe aircraft with the loss of nine of her crew. Survivors (30 crew and fifteen passengers) were rescued by HMS Arrow (Royal Navy).
Avvenire	Italy	World War II: The coaster (957 GRT) on a voyage from Civitavecchia for Tripoli, with a cargo of gasoline in drums, struck a mine, exploded and sank in the Mediterranean Sea 20 nautical miles (37 km) north of Pantelleria (37°20′N 12°13′E) with a loss of 5 of her 14 crew.
HNoMS B-3	Royal Norwegian Navy	World War II: The B-class submarine suffered a battery explosion in Gavlefjord off Alsvåg, Norway and was subsequently scuttled to prevent capture by German forces.
HMT Dewey Eve	Royal Navy	World War II: The naval trawler was sunk at Scapa Flow in a collision with the fishing trawler Gold Crown (United Kingdom).
Dockenhuden	Germany	The coaster was sunk in the Baltic Sea off Stolpmünde.
Dulwich	United Kingdom	World War II: The cargo ship was bombed and sunk in the English Channel off Villequier, Seine-Inférieure, France, by Luftwaffe aircraft. She was later salvaged by the Germans and entered service as Holtenau.
Empire Commerce	United Kingdom	World War II: The cargo ship struck a mine in the North Sea off Margate, Kent. She was severely damaged and was declared a constructive total loss. She was the first Empire ship lost through enemy action.
Kong Halfdan	Norway	World War II: The cargo ship struck a mine and sank in the Great Belt. She was refloated in May 1941, repaired, and returned to service in April 1942.
Madeleine Louise	French Navy	World War II: The auxiliary minesweeper was bombed and sunk at Dunkirk, Nord by Luftwaffe aircraft.
Margareta	Finland	World War II: The cargo ship was torpedoed and sunk in the Atlantic Ocean 350 nautical miles (650 km) off Cape Finisterre, Spain (44°04′N 12°30′W) by U-46 (Kriegsmarine) with the loss of five of her 24 crew.
Max Wolf	Greece	World War II: The cargo ship (6,694 GRT) was bombed and damaged in the English Channel off Berville, Seine-Inférieure by Luftwaffe aircraft and was beached at Tancarville. Two of her crew were killed. There were 22 survivors. Max Wolf was subsequently used as a target ship by the Luftwaffe. She was broken up between 1946 and 1953.
Notre Dames des Dunes	French Navy	World War II: The auxiliary minesweeper was bombed and sunk at Dunkirk by Luftwaffe aircraft.
Prins Olav	Norway	World War II: The passenger ship was bombed and sunk in the Norwegian Sea (67°55′N 2°10′E) by Luftwaffe aircraft with the loss of a crew member. Thirty survivors were rescued by HMS Arrow (Royal Navy).
Turquoise	Belgium	World War II: The cargo ship was scuttled at Dieppe.
V-801 Bayern	Kriegsmarine	World War II: The vorpostenboot struck a mine and sank in the Wadden Sea off Ameland, Friesland, Netherlands (53°33′N 6°02′E) with the loss of five lives. Survivors were rescued by V-803 (Kriegsmarine).
HMS Vandyck	Royal Navy	World War II: The ocean boarding vessel was bombed and sunk west of Narvik, Norway by Luftwaffe aircraft with the loss of seven of the 168 people on board. Survivors were taken as prisoners of war.

== 10 June ==
List of shipwrecks: 10 June 1940
Ship	State	Description
Capo Noli	Italy	World War II: The cargo ship was beached by her crew in the St Lawrence River, near Rimouski, Quebec, Canada. An attempt to scuttle the ship was foiled by HMCS Bras d'Or (Royal Canadian Navy). There were no casualties. Cape Noli was later salvaged by the Canadians and re-entered service as Bic Island.
Cellina	Italy	World War II: The cargo ship was scuttled in the Bay of Gibraltar to prevent capture by British forces.
Danilo B.	Italy	World War II: The 101 GRT motor barquentine struck a mine and sank 4 nautical miles (7.4 km) northwest off Punta Carena, Capri.
Ellavore	Norway	World War II: The cargo ship was bombed and damaged in the English Channel off Le Havre, Seine-Inférieure, France by Luftwaffe aircraft. She was beached, but attempts to salvage her were abandoned. Her crew survived.
Jacobus	United Kingdom	World War II: The cargo ship was sunk as a blockship at Dieppe, Seine-Inférieure.
Karanja	United Kingdom	World War II: The passenger ship was damaged when a time bomb exploded and set her afire. She was on a voyage from Bombay, India to Durban, Union of South Africa. The fire was extinguished and she completed her voyage. Subsequently repaired and returned to service.
Kaupo	United Kingdom	World War II: The tanker was sunk as a blockship at Dieppe.
Lavoro	Italy	World War II: The cargo ship was scuttled at Gibraltar to prevent capture by British forces.
Libano	Italy	World War II: The cargo ship was scuttled at Gibraltar to prevent capture by British forces. She was later salvaged by the British, repaired and re-entered service.
Numbolio	Italy	World War II: The cargo ship was scuttled in Algeciras Bay to prevent capture by British forces.
Olterra	Italy	World War II: The tanker was partially sunk by her Italian crew in the Bay of Gibraltar off Algeciras, Spain. She was raised and repaired in 1942 and placed in service with the Regia Marina (Italian Royal Navy) as a mother ship for Italian naval commandos.
Pagao	Italy	World War II: The tanker was scuttled at Rada di Algeceiras, Spain.
Pollenzo	Italy	World War II: The cargo ship was scuttled at Algeciras.
River Ness	United Kingdom	World War II: The fishing trawler was bombed and sunk in the Irish Sea 8 nautical miles (15 km) north east by north of The Skerries, Anglesey by Luftwaffe aircraft. Eight crew were killed. There were two survivors.
River Tyne	United Kingdom	World War II: The cargo ship was scuttled as a blockship at Dieppe.
Sonja	Sweden	World War II: The cargo ship with a German prize crew was proceeding behind the steamship Inger (Flag unknown) when she detonated a mine and sank.
Sverre Sigurdssøn	Norway	World War II: The cargo ship struck a mine and sank in Hjeltefjorden (60°36′N 4°55′E) with the loss of a crew member.
Umbria	Italy	World War II: The cargo liner was scuttled in the Red Sea near Port Sudan (37°19.40′N 19°38.20′E) to prevent capture by HMS Grimsby (Royal Navy). She was carrying a cargo of 5,000 tons of bombs, which remain in the wreck and pose a risk to Port Sudan, to Eritrea.
HMS Van Dyck	Royal Navy	World War II: Operation Alphabet: The armed boarding vessel was bombed and sunk in the Norwegian Sea off Andenes, Norway by a Focke-Wulf Fw 200 aircraft of I Staffeln, Kampfgeschwader 40, Luftwaffe with the loss of seven of the 168 people on board.

== 11 June ==
List of shipwrecks: 11 June 1940
Ship	State	Description
Albertville	Belgium	World War II: The ocean liner was bombed and sunk by Luftwaffe aircraft in the Havre Roads 1.5 nautical miles (2.8 km; 1.7 mi) off Octeville-sur-Mer, Seine-Inférieure, France. There were no casualties.
Bruges	United Kingdom	World War II: The ferry was bombed and damaged at Le Havre, Seine-Inférieure, by Luftwaffe aircraft. She was beached to prevent her sinking.
Caprice	United States	The 30-foot (9.1 m) fishing vessel burned and sank in Sitka Sound near Saint Lazaria Island approximately 12 nautical miles (22 km; 14 mi) off Sitka, Territory of Alaska. The fishing vessel Terry C (United States) rescued her crew of two.
Général Metzinger	France	World War II: The troopship was bombed and sunk at Le Havre by Luftwaffe aircraft with the loss of six crew. She was refloated in 1950 and scrapped.
Kai	Denmark	World War II: The cargo ship struck a mine and sank in Danish waters off Langeland. One crew was killed. Later refloated, she was repaired and returned to service.
La Bretonnière	French Navy	World War II: The auxiliary minesweeper was scuttled at Le Havre.
Makis	Greece	World War II: The 3,546 GRT cargo ship on a trip from Cardiff for Piraeus with a cargo of coal, struck an Italian mine and sank in the Mediterranean Sea 15 nautical miles (28 km) north of Pantelleria, Italy. Her crew were rescued.
Marzocco	Italy	World War II: The cargo ship ran aground in the North Sea off Peterhead, Aberdeenshire, United Kingdom, during an attempted scuttling following seizure by the British the previous day. She broke in two. Subsequently used as a blockship at Scapa Flow, Orkney Islands.
Mount Hymettus	Greece	World War II: The cargo ship was torpedoed, shelled and sunk in the Atlantic Ocean west of Cape Finisterre, Spain (42°12′N 11°20′W) by U-101 (Kriegsmarine). All 24 crew survived.
Niobe	France	World War II: The cargo ship was bombed and sunk in the English Channel off Le Havre by Luftwaffe aircraft. She was carrying between 800 and 1,200 people, mainly refugees, and most were lost when her ammunition cargo exploded. There were only 11 survivors.
Patrice II	French Navy	World War II: The auxiliary patrol vessel was shelled and sunk in the English Channel off Fécamp, Seine-Inférieure, by German artillery.
Piriapolis	Belgium	World War II: The cargo ship was bombed and sunk 5 1/4 nautical miles (9.7 km) off the Cap d'Antifer Lighthouse, Seine-Inférieure by Luftwaffe aircraft.
Polinice	Italy	World War II: The cargo ship was scuttled at Malta following seizure by the British the previous day.
B-117 Predappio	Regia Marina	World War II: The 26 GRT auxiliary minesweeper, a former motor schooner, struck a mine and sank off Taranto.
Saint Ronaig	United Kingdom	World War II: The coaster struck a mine and sank in the English Channel off Seaford, Sussex with the loss of four of her eight crew. The wreck was dispersed in July 1950 by HMS Flatholm (Royal Navy).
San Calogero	Italy	World War II: The 57 GRT fishing vessel struck a mine and sank off Taranto.
Syrie	France	World War II: The cargo ship was bombed and sunk in the English Channel off Le Havre by Luftwaffe aircraft.
Timavo	Italy	World War II: The cargo liner was spotted off Durban, Union of South Africa by South African Air Force aircraft and forced to divert to a South African port, but was deliberately run aground and wrecked by her Italian crew near Leven Point, Union of South Africa (27°49′S 32°36′E). All 50 men aboard survived and were captured. The ship was wrecked but a part of her cargo was saved.
Violando N. Goulandris	Greece	World War II: The cargo ship was torpedoed and sunk in the Atlantic Ocean west north west of Cape Finisterre, Spain (44°04′N 12°30′W) by U-48 (Kriegsmarine) with the loss of six of her 28 crew.
Zinovia	Greece	World War II: The cargo ship struck a mine and sank in the Mediterranean Sea 20 nautical miles (37 km)) north of Pantelleria. Two of her crew were killed.

== 12 June ==
List of shipwrecks: 12 June 1940
Ship	State	Description
Barbara Marie	United Kingdom	World War II: Convoy SL 34: The 4,223 GRT cargo ship on a voyage from Pepel for Workington with a cargo of iron ore, was torpedoed and sunk in the Atlantic Ocean (44°16′N 13°54′W) by U-46 (Kriegsmarine) with the loss of 32 of her 37 crew. Survivors were rescued by HMS Leith (Royal Navy) and Swedru (United Kingdom).
Baron Saltoun	United Kingdom	World War II: The 3,404 GRT cargo ship on a passage from Hull for Bordeaux with a cargo of coal, struck a mine and sank in the English Channel off Cherbourg, Seine-Inférieure, France with the loss of one of her 33 crew.
HMS Calypso	Royal Navy	World War II: The C-class cruiser was torpedoed and sunk in the Mediterranean Sea, south of Crete, Greece (33°45′N 24°23′E) by Alpino Bagnolini (Regia Marina) with the loss of 39 of her 344 crew.
Carlo	Italy	World War II: The 253 GRT schooner struck a mine and sank about 18 nautical miles (33 km) off Pianosa.
P21 Cérons	French Navy	World War II: The 1,049 GRT converted patrol boat ran aground at Saint-Valery-en-Caux while embarking soldiers during evacuation. While soldiers were unloading onto P22 Sauternes (French Navy), the crew became engaged in a battle with German artillery. The ship was set afire and destroyed, and the crew were taken prisoners.
Earlspark	United Kingdom	World War II: Convoy OG 33F: The 5,250 GRT cargo ship on a trip from Sunderland for Bordeaux with a cargo of coal, was torpedoed and sunk in the Atlantic Ocean (42°26′N 11°33′W) by U-101 (Kriegsmarine) with the loss of seven of her 38 crew. Survivors were rescued by HMS Enchantress (Royal Navy).
Etienne Rimbert	French Navy	World War II: The auxiliary patrol vessel was scuttled at Dieppe, Seine-Inférieure.
Giovanni Berta	Regia Marina	World War II: The Giovanni Berta-class naval trawler was sunk in the Mediterranean Sea off Tobruk, Libya by HMS Gloucester, HMS Liverpool, and aircraft based on HMS Eagle (all Royal Navy).
Granville	French Navy	World War II: The auxiliary minesweeper was shelled and sunk in the English Channel between Fécamp and Saint-Valery-en-Caux, Seine-Inférieure, by German artillery.
Himalaya	United Kingdom	World War II: The coal hulk, a retired passenger ship, was bombed and sunk at Weymouth, Dorset by a Junkers Ju 88 aircraft of the Luftwaffe.
Innisulva	United Kingdom	World War II: The 264 GRT coaster was beached and abandoned in the River Seine at Paris, France with the loss of four of her five crew. She was subsequently salvaged by the Germans and re-entered service with them under that name.
La Mora	Italy	World War II: The 15 GRT motor fishing boat struck a mine and sank west of the mouth of Serchio.
Monte Piana	Italy	World War II: The cargo ship was intercepted by Royal Navy vessels. An attempt was made to scuttle her, but she was beached at Aden, Aden Colony. Seized as a prize of war, she was renamed Empire Baron. Subsequently repaired and entered British service.
Orkanger	Norway	World War II: The 8,029 GRT tanker on a voyage from Abadan for Malta with a cargo of fuel oil, was torpedoed and sunk in the Mediterranean Sea off Alexandria, Egypt (31°42′N 28°50′E) by Naiade and Nereide (both Regia Marina) with the loss of five of the 39 people on board.
Prinses Juliana	Netherlands	World War II: The coaster (198 GRT) struck a mine and sank in Poole Bay, Dorset (5°38′N 1°35′W) with the loss of two of her crew.
Romolo	Italy	World War II: The cargo liner was intercepted in the Pacific Ocean near the Solomon Islands (2°20′S 163°45′E) by HMAS Manoora (Royal Australian Navy) and was scuttled.
HMT Sisapon	Royal Navy	World War II: The naval trawler (326 GRT, 1928) struck a mine and sank in the North Sea off Felixtowe, Suffolk with the loss of eleven of her crew.
Swallow	United Kingdom	World War II: The 209 GRT coaster was beached and abandoned in the River Seine in Paris. All six crew survived. She was subsequently salvaged by the Germans and re-entered service as Schwalbe.
Train Ferry No. 2	United Kingdom	World War II: The train ferry was shelled and damaged in the English Channel at Saint-Valery-en-Caux by German artillery. She was beached and abandoned.
Twente	Netherlands	World War II: The tug struck a mine in the North Sea and sank.
Willowbank	United Kingdom	World War II: The 5,041 GRT cargo ship on a trip from Durban for Hull with a cargo of maize, was torpedoed and sunk in the Atlantic Ocean 220 nautical miles (410 km; 250 mi) west-northwest of Cape Finisterre, Spain (44°16′N 13°54′W) by U-46 (Kriegsmarine). All 51 crew were rescued by Swedru (United Kingdom).
Yvonne	Belgium	World War II: The coaster (668 GRT) struck a mine and sank two nautical miles (3.7 km; 2.3 mi) north of the Goodwin Knoll Buoy, off the coast of Kent, United Kingdom with the loss of ten of her twelve crew.

== 13 June ==
List of shipwrecks: 13 June 1940
Ship	State	Description
Abel Tasman	Netherlands	World War II: The coaster struck a mine at the entrance to Poole Harbour, Dorset and sank with the loss of all on board.
Admiral Wiley	United States	The cargo ship ran aground on Kitava, Papua New Guinea and was wrecked. Her crew were taken off by the armed merchant cruiser HMAS Manoora (Royal Australian Navy).
British Inventor	United Kingdom	World War II: The tanker struck a mine in Poole Bay, Dorset and was beached. The ship broke in two on 30 July and the bow section sank. The stern section was salvaged, repaired and returned to service.
British Petrol	United Kingdom	World War II: The tanker was captured in the Atlantic Ocean 1,000 nautical miles (1,900 km) off Trinidad (20°10′N 46°56′W) by Widder (Kriegsmarine) with the loss of two of her 46 crew. survivors were taken as prisoners of war. She was scuttled the next day (18°00′N 54°30′W).
Caroline Susan	United Kingdom	World War II: The motor yacht struck a mine and sank in the English Channel south of Bournemouth, Hampshire.
Marthe Roland	French Navy	World War II: The auxiliary minesweeper was scuttled at Dieppe, Seine-Inférieure, France.
HNLMS O 13	Royal Netherlands Navy	World War II: The O 12-class submarine was lost with all hands. At one time thought to have been rammed and sunk by ORP Wilk (Polish Navy) in the North Sea, but the sub rammed was a German U-boat. She was probably sunk by a mine.
HMT Ocean Sunlight	Royal Navy	World War II: The 94.3-foot (28.7 m) minesweeping naval trawler struck a mine and sank in the English Channel off Seaford, Sussex, or 4.4 cables from West Breakwater Light, Newhaven, with the loss of ten crew.
Reines des Flots	French Navy	World War II: The harbour defence vessel was scuttled at Dieppe.
HMS Scotstoun	Royal Navy	World War II: The armed merchant cruiser was torpedoed and sunk in the Atlantic Ocean west of Barra, Outer Hebrides (57°00′N 9°57′W) by U-25 (Kriegsmarine) with the loss of six of her 352 crew. Survivors were rescued by HMS Highlander (Royal Navy).

== 14 June ==
List of shipwrecks: 14 June 1940
Ship	State	Description
Antonis Georgandis	Greece	World War II: The cargo ship (3,557 GRT) was stopped and then shelled and sunk in the Atlantic Ocean northwest of Cape Finisterre, Spain (42°45′N 16°20′W) by U-101 (Kriegsmarine). No lives were lost.
Balmoralwood	United Kingdom	World War II: Convoy HX 47: The cargo ship straggled behind the convoy. She was torpedoed and sunk in the Atlantic Ocean (50°19′N 10°28′W) by U-47 (Kriegsmarine). All 41 crew were rescued by Germaine (Greece).>
Martis	United Kingdom	World War II: The cargo ship was scuttled as a blockship in Churchill Sound, Scapa Flow, Orkney Islands partially beached (58°53′5″N 2°54′49″W). Her stern, bow and superstructure were removed in the late 1940s.
Mount Myrto	Greece	World War II: The cargo ship was torpedoed and sunk in the Celtic Sea (50°03′N 10°05′W) by U-38 (Kriegsmarine) with the loss of four of her 24 crew.
HMT Myrtle	Royal Navy	World War II: The naval trawler struck a mine and sank in the North Sea off the north coast of Kent with the loss of all 22 crew.
HMS Odin	Royal Navy	World War II: The Odin-class submarine was depth charged in the Gulf of Taranto, off Crotone, Italy, by Strale (Regia Marina) and Baleno (Regia Marina) and sunk with the loss of 56 crew.

== 15 June ==
List of shipwrecks: 15 June 1940
Ship	State	Description
HMS Andania	Royal Navy	World War II: The armed merchant cruiser was torpedoed and sunk in the Atlantic Ocean off Reykjavík, Iceland (62°36′N 15°09′W) by UA (Kriegsmarine). All 347 crew were rescued by the fishing trawler Skallagrimur ( Iceland).
Erik Boye	Canada	World War II: Convoy HX 47: The cargo ship was torpedoed and sunk in the Celtic Sea (50°37′N 8°44′W) by U-38 (Kriegsmarine). All 22 crew were rescued by HMS Fowey (Royal Navy).
Frankenstein	Germany	World War II: The cargo ship (3,703 GRT) ran aground off Florø, Norway. She sank there on 20 July and the wreck was bombed and destroyed by British aircraft on 19 April 1941.
Italia	Norway	World War II: Convoy HX 47: The cargo ship was torpedoed and sunk in the Atlantic Ocean south of Ireland (50°37′N 8°44′W) by U-38 (Kriegsmarine) with the loss of nineteen of her 35 crew. Survivors were rescued by HMS Fowey (Royal Navy).
Macallé	Regia Marina	The Adua-class submarine ran aground in the Red Sea (19°00′N 38°00′E). Her crew were rescued by Guglielmotti (Regia Marina). The submarine was shelled on 27 June by HMS Kandahar, HMS Kingston (Royal Navy) and HMNZS Leander (Royal New Zealand Navy). Aircraft from HMNZS Leander also bombed the beached submarine.
Morse	French Navy	World War II: The Requin-class submarine struck a mine and sank in the Mediterranean Sea off Kerkennah, Tunisia with the loss of all hands.

== 16 June ==
List of shipwrecks: 16 June 1940
Ship	State	Description
HMS Grampus	Royal Navy	World War II: The Grampus-class submarine was depth charged and sunk in the Mediterranean Sea east of Sicily, Italy, by Circe, Clio, Calliope, and Polluce (all Regia Marina) with the loss of all 59 crew.
La Coubre	France	World War II: The dredger struck a mine and sank in the Bay of Biscay off Saint-Nazaire, Loire-Inférieure, with the loss of three of her crew.
James Stove	Norway	World War II: The tanker was torpedoed and sunk in the Red Sea 12 nautical miles (22 km; 14 mi) south of Aden (12°35′N 45°03′E) by Galileo Galilei (Regia Marina). All 34 crew were rescued by HMT Moonstone (Royal Navy).
Königsberg	Germany	World War II: The cargo ship was intercepted in the Atlantic Ocean off Vigo, Spain (41°36′N 10°37′W) by Président Houduce (French Navy) and was scuttled.
Rastrello	Italy	World War II: The 1,550 GRT cargo ship was sunk in the port of Naples, Italy, by a torpedo fired accidentally by Procione (Regia Marina). There were no casualties.
Samland	Kriegsmarine	World War II: The tanker was torpedoed and sunk in the North Sea 5 nautical miles (9.3 km; 5.8 mi) off Lista, Norway (58°18′N 5°40′E) by HMS Tetrarch (Royal Navy).
Wellington Star	United Kingdom	World War II: The cargo liner was torpedoed and sunk in the Atlantic Ocean off Cape Finisterre (42°39′N 17°01′W) by U-101 (Kriegsmarine). Fifty-two of her 69 crew were rescued by Pierre L D (France), the remainder reached land in their lifeboat.

== 17 June ==
List of shipwrecks: 17 June 1940
Ship	State	Description
Athlete	France	World War II: The tug was scuttled at Brest, Finistère.
Capitaine Maurice Eugene	France	World War II: The cargo ship was scuttled at Brest.
SS Champlain	France	World War II: The ocean liner struck a mine in the Bay of Biscay off La Pallice, Charente-Inférieure, and sank with the loss of eleven or twelve of the 370 people on board. She was torpedoed on 21 June by U-65 (Kriegsmarine). The wreck was broken up in situ in 1963-64.
Elpis	Greece	World War II: The cargo ship was torpedoed and sunk in the Atlantic Ocean west of Cape Finisterre, Spain (43°46′N 14°06′W) by U-46 (Kriegsmarine). All 28 crew were rescued.
Komet	Norway	World War II: The cargo ship was bombed and sunk in the English Channel 25 nautical miles (46 km; 29 mi) off Caen, France, by Luftwaffe aircraft with the loss of two of her sixteen crew. Survivors were rescued by a French fishing trawler.
HMS Lancastria	Royal Navy	World War II: Operation Aerial: The troopship was bombed and sunk off Saint-Nazaire, Loire-Inférieure, France (47°08′48″N 2°20′18″E), by Junkers Ju 88 aircraft of II Gruppe, Kampfgeschwader 30, Luftwaffe with the loss of 2,899 of the 5,310 people on board. Survivors were rescued by HMT Cambridgeshire and HMS Highlander (both Royal Navy), Cymbula, Fabian, Glenaffaric, John Holt, Oronsay, Robert L Holt and Ulster Prince (all United Kingdom).
HMT Murmansk	Royal Navy	World War II: The naval trawler ran aground at Brest and was abandoned without loss. She was later salvaged by the Germans and entered service as KFK-76
Provana	Regia Marina	World War II: The Marcello-class submarine (1,060 GRT) was depth charged, rammed and sunk in the Mediterranean Sea off Oran, Algeria (37°00′N 0°11′W) by La Curieuse (French Navy) with the loss of all 62 hands.
Inginieur Riebell	French Navy	World War II: The auxiliary minesweeper scuttled at Cherbourg, Seine-Inférieure. She was subsequently salvaged by the Germans and used as an armed coastal vessel.
Roche Noire	French Navy	World War II: The auxiliary minesweeper was scuttled at Brest.
Teiresias	United Kingdom	World War II: The cargo ship was bombed and damaged in the Bay of Biscay off Noirmoutier, Vendée, France (47°07′N 2°23′W) by Luftwaffe aircraft with the loss of one of her 71 crew. She was beached and abandoned off Saint-Nazaire as a constructive total loss. Survivors were rescued by Holmside (United Kingdom).

== 18 June ==
List of shipwrecks: 18 June 1940
Ship	State	Description
Achille	French Navy	World War II: The Redoutable-class submarine was scuttled in a drydock at Brest, Finistère.
Agosta	French Navy	World War II: The Redoutable-class submarine was scuttled in a drydock at Brest.
Alexis de Tocqueville	French Navy	World War II: The auxiliary minesweeper was scuttled at Brest.
Altair	Norway	World War II: The cargo ship was torpedoed and damaged in the Atlantic Ocean south west of Cornwall, United Kingdom (49°39′N 11°15′W) by U-32 (Kriegsmarine) All eighteen crew were rescued by the fishing trawler Iparreko-Izarra (Spain). Altair was scuttled two days later by HMS Prunella (Royal Navy) at 49°36′N 11°22′W.
CH-16	French Navy	World War II: The CH-5-class submarine chaser was scuttled incomplete off the Île de Groix, Morbihan.
Clemenceau	French Navy	World War II: The incomplete Richelieu-class battleship was scuttled at Brest.
Cyclone	French Navy	World War II: Dunkirk evacuation: Torpedoed and damaged by the E-boat S24 (Kriegsmarine) on 30 May 1940, the Bourrasque-class destroyer (1,298/1,968 t, 1926) was scuttled at Brest, France to prevent her capture by advancing German forces.
Dalila	France	The cargo ship sank at Cherbourg, Manche. She was refloated on 14 October, repaired and entered German service.
Dido	United Kingdom	World War II: The cargo ship was damaged and abandoned at Brest. She was subsequently salvaged by the Germans and re-entered service as Dorpat.
Dordogne	France	World War II: The tanker was scuttled at Brest.
Enseigne Henri	French Navy	World War II: The Dubourdieu-class gunboat was scuttled at Lorient, Morbihan, to prevent capture by German forces. she was subsequently raised and scrapped by the Germans.
Etourdi	French Navy	World War II: The Ardent-class gunboat was scuttled at Brest to prevent capture by German forces.
Gaulois	French Navy	World War II: The auxiliary minesweeper was scuttled at Saint-Servan, Ille-et-Vilaine.
Goury	French Navy	World War II: The naval tug was scuttled at Cherbourg, Seine-Inférieure.
Hester	United Kingdom	World War II: The cargo ship was scuttled at Rochefort, Charente-Inférieure, France. She was later salvaged by the Germans and entered service with them.
Jacob Christensen	Norway	World War II: The cargo ship was scuttled at Rochefort. She was later salvaged by the Germans and entered service as Baldur.
Kergroise	French Navy	World War II: The auxiliary minesweeper was scuttled at Lorient.
La Valette	French Navy	World War II: The naval tug was scuttled at Lorient.
M-5	Kriegsmarine	World War II: The Type M-1935 minesweeper struck a mine and sank in the Norwegian Sea north of Kristiansand, Norway (63°30′N 8°12′E). Twenty-eight crew were killed.
Lutteur	French Navy	World War II: The tug was scuttled at Brest. She was subsequently salvaged and repaired by the Germans and entered Kriegsmarine service as V 1801 Lutteur.
Madda	Italy	World War II: The 5,181 GRT cargo ship was spotted and fired upon off Tenerife by D'Entrecasteaux. The Italian vessel refused to stop, and moved full speed to Santa Cruz de Tenerife, being able to escape her pursuer. She remained there for the duration of the war, and was sold in 1945 to Spain, entering service as Monte Nafarrate.
Marquitta	French Navy	World War II: The auxiliary minesweeper was scuttled at Cherbourg.
P-49 Mouette	French Navy	World War II: The auxiliary patrol vessel was scuttled at Brest.
Nuevo Ons	Spain	World War II: The fishing trawler was shelled and sunk in the Atlantic Ocean south west of Land's End, Cornwall, United Kingdom (49°39′N 11°00′W) by U-32 (Kriegsmarine) with the loss of six of her thirteen crew. Survivors were rescued by the fishing trawler Iparreko-Izarra (Spain).
Ondine II	French Navy	World War II: The water carrier was scuttled at Lorient.
Ouessant	French Navy	World War II: The Redoutable-class submarine was scuttled at Brest to prevent capture by German forces.
Pasteur	French Navy	World War II: The Redoutable-class submarine was scuttled at Breste to prevent capture by German forces.
Pluvoise	French Navy	World War II: The auxiliary minesweeper was scuttled at Lorient.
Reno	Italy	World War II: The 1,002 GRT cargo ship on a trip from Gallipoli for Ravenna, struck a mine and sank in the Adriatic Sea 11 nautical miles (20 km) off Ancona.
Ronwyn	United Kingdom	World War II: The cargo ship was scuttled at Rochefort. She was later salvaged by the Germans and entered service as Hochheimer.
Sálvora	Spain	World War II: The fishing trawler was shelled and sunk in the Atlantic Ocean south west of Land's End (49°39′N 11°00′W) by U-32 (Kriegsmarine). All twelve crew were rescued by the fushing trawler Iparreko-Izarra (Spain).
Sarmatia	Finland	World War II: The cargo ship was torpedoed and sunk in the Atlantic Ocean south west of Land's End (49°09′N 12°05′W) by U-28 (Kriegsmarine). All 23 crew were rescued by the fishing trawlers Felix and Pastor Montenegro (both Spain).
Sonja	Sweden	World War II: The cargo ship struck a mine and sank in the North Sea (63°30′N 8°12′E) with the loss of twelve of her 21 crew. Survivors were rescued by Inger (Norway).
HDMS Springeren	Royal Danish Navy	World War II: The minesweeper, a former Springeren-class torpedo boat foundered on this date. She was raised, repaired and returned to service in 1943.
Vauquois	French Navy	World War II: The Arras-class gunboat struck a mine off Le Conquet, Finistère, and was damaged. She was subsequently scuttled. One hundred and thirty-five crewmen were killed.

== 19 June ==
List of shipwrecks: 19 June 1940
Ship	State	Description
Adamandios Georgandis	Greece	World War II: The cargo ship was torpedoed and sunk in the Atlantic Ocean south west of Ireland (49°35′N 11°15′W) by U-28 (Kriegsmarine) with the loss of a crew member. Ireland sought an explanation from Germany.
Baron Loudoun	United Kingdom	World War II: Convoy HGF 34: The cargo ship was torpedoed and sunk in the Atlantic Ocean west north west of Cape Ortegal, Portugal (45°00′N 11°21′W) by U-48 (Kriegsmarine) with the loss of three of her 33 crew. Survivors were rescued by HMS Scarborough (Royal Navy).
British Monarch	United Kingdom	The cargo ship was torpedoed and sunk in the Atlantic Ocean (45°00′N 11°21′W) by U-48 (Kriegsmarine) with the loss of all 40 crew.
Brumaire	France	World War II: The tanker was torpedoed and damaged in the Bay of Biscay by U-25 (Kriegsmarine). She was bombed and sunk the next day at 47°14′N 3°16′W by Luftwaffe aircraft.
Labud	Yugoslavia	World War II: The cargo ship was torpedoed, shelled, and sunk in the Atlantic Ocean south west of the Fastnet Rock by U-32 (Kriegsmarine). All 34 crew were rescued. Labud was on a voyage from Table Bay to Liverpool, Lancashire, United Kingdom.
La Praya	French Navy	World War II: The Roland Morillot-class submarine was destroyed on slip at Cherbourg, Seine-Inférieure, to prevent capture by German forces.
La Tanche	France	World War II: The fishing trawler struck a mine and sank in the Bay of Biscay off Lorient, Morbihan.
Le Martinique	French Navy	World War II: The Roland Morillot-class submarine was destroyed on slip at Cherbourg to prevent capture by German forces.
M-1802 Friedrich Müller	Kriegsmarine	World War II: The auxiliary minesweeper struck a mine and sank in the North Sea north west of Heligoland.
Mexique	French Navy	World War II: The armed merchant cruiser struck a mine and sank in the Bay of Biscay off Le Verdon-sur-Mer, Gironde. All 178 crew were rescued.
RMS Niagara	United Kingdom	World War II: The ocean liner struck a mine and sank in the Pacific Ocean off Bream Head, New Zealand (35°53′S 174°54′E). All on board survived.
HMS Orpheus	Royal Navy	World War II: The Odin-class submarine was sunk in the Mediterranean Sea north of Tobruk, Libya by Turbine (Regia Marina) with the loss of all 55 crew.
President Paul Doumer	French Navy	World War II: The auxiliary minesweeper a Neuwerk-class naval trawler, was sunk on this date. She was later raised, repaired and entered Kriegsmarine service as M 4005.
Roland Morillot	French Navy	World War II: The Roland Morillot-class submarine was destroyed on slip at Cherbourg to prevent capture by German forces.
Roseburn	United Kingdom	World War II: The cargo ship was shelled and torpedoed in the English Channel five nautical miles (9.3 km; 5.8 mi) off Dungeness, Kent by German motor torpedo boats S-19 and S-26 (both Kriegsmarine). She was beached but declared a total loss. Her crew were rescued by the drifter Lord Howe (United Kingdom).
The Monarch	United Kingdom	World War II: The coaster was torpedoed and sunk in the Bay of Biscay off Point Penmarc'h, Finistère, France (47°20′N 4°40′W) by U-52 (Kriegsmarine) with the loss of all twelve crew.
Tudor	Norway	World War II: Convoy HGF 34: The cargo ship was torpedoed and sunk in the Atlantic Ocean north west of Cape Finisterre, Spain (45°10′N 11°50′W) by U-48 (Kriegsmarine) with the loss of one of her 39 crew. Survivors were rescued by HMS Arabis and HMS Calendula (both Royal Navy).
Ville de Namur	Belgium	World War II: The passenger ship was torpedoed and sunk in the Bay of Biscay (46°25′N 4°35′W) by U-52 (Kriegsmarine) with the loss of 25 of her 79 crew.

== 20 June ==
List of shipwrecks: 20 June 1940
Ship	State	Description
Adamantios	Greece	World War II: The cargo ship was bombed and sunk in the English Channel off La Rochelle, Charente-Inférieure, France, by Luftwaffe aircraft. She was beached on the Île de Ré the next day. Her 32 crew survived. She was later salvaged by the Germans and seized as a prize of war.
Diamante	Regia Marina	World War II: The submarine was torpedoed and sunk in the Mediterranean Sea off Tobruk, Libya (32°42′N 23°49′E) by HMS Parthian (Royal Navy).
Empire Conveyor	United Kingdom	World War II: The cargo ship was torpedoed and sunk in the Atlantic Ocean off Barra Head, Outer Hebrides (58°16′N 8°10′W) by U-122 (Kriegsmarine) with the loss of three of her 41 crew. The survivors were rescued by HMS Campbell (Royal Navy).
Foucauld	France	World War II: The passenger ship was bombed and sunk in the Bay of Biscay off La Pallice, Charente-Inférieure, by Luftwaffe aircraft.
James McGee	Panama	World War II: The tanker struck a mine and sank in the Bristol Channel 2 nautical miles (3.7 km) south west of Nash Point, Glamorgan, United Kingdom. Her crew were rescued by HMS Wolverine (Royal Navy).
Moordrecht	Netherlands	World War II: Convoy HX 49: The tanker straggled behind the convoy. She was torpedoed and sunk in the Atlantic Ocean off Portugal (43°34′N 14°20′W) by U-48 (Kriegsmarine) with the loss of 25 of her 29 crew. Survivors were rescued by Orion (Greece).
Otterpool	United Kingdom	World War II: Convoy HG 34F: The cargo ship was torpedoed and sunk in the Atlantic Ocean south west of Land's End, Cornwall (48°45′N 8°13′W) by U-30 (Kriegsmarine) with the loss of 23 of her 38 crew. Survivors were rescued by HMS Scarborough (Royal Navy).
Stesso	United Kingdom	World War II: The cargo ship was bombed and sunk at Cardiff, Glamorgan, by Luftwaffe aircraft. She was later refloated, and departed on 31 December for scrapping at Briton Ferry, Glamorgan.
Tilia Gorthon	Sweden	World War II: The cargo ship was torpedoed and sunk in the English Channel south of Land's End (48°32′N 6°20′W) by U-38 (Kriegsmarine) with the loss of ten of her 21 crew. Survivors were rescued by HMS Leith (Royal Navy).

== 21 June ==
List of shipwrecks: 21 June 1940
Ship	State	Description
Alfa	Denmark	World War II: The coaster was torpedoed and sunk in the North Sea 12 nautical miles (22 km; 14 mi) off the Eierland Lighthouse, Texel, North Holland, Netherlands by HMS H44 (Royal Navy) with the loss of four of her crew.
Berenice	Netherlands	World War II: The cargo ship was torpedoed and sunk in the Bay of Biscay (47°10′N 3°35′W) by U-65 (Kriegsmarine) with the loss of 39 of the 47 people on board.<ref"SS Berenice (+1940)". Wrecksite.</ref> She was subsequently refloated and scrapped.
Biscarosse	France	World War II: The cargo ship was scuttled at Le Havre, Seine-Inférieure.
HMS Cape Howe	Royal Navy	World War II: The Q-ship (4,443 GRT, 1930), disguised as the Royal Fleet Auxiliary vessel Prunella, was torpedoed and sunk in the Celtic Sea (49°45′N 8°47′W) by U-28 (Kriegsmarine) with the loss of 55 of her 95 crew. Survivors were rescued by Casamance (France) and HMS Versatile (Royal Navy).
HMT Charde	Royal Navy	The naval trawler sank in Portsmouth Harbour, Hampshire.
Hilda	Finland	World War II: The cargo ship was torpedoed and sunk in the Bay of Biscay (45°46′N 3°17′W) by U-52 (Kriegsmarine) with the loss of five of her sixteen crew.
Luffworth	United Kingdom	World War II: The coaster was abandoned at Brest, Finistère, France. She was later seized by the Germans as a prize of war.
Luxembourg	Belgium	Luxembourg World War II: The cargo ship was torpedoed and sunk in the Bay of Biscay (47°25′N 4°55′W) by U-38 (Kriegsmarine) with the loss of five of her 46 crew.
Mecanicien Principal Carvin	France	World War II: The cargo ship was bombed and sunk in the Bay of Biscay off Le Verdon-sur-Mer, Gironde by Luftwaffe aircraft.
Mercéditta	French Navy	World War II: The auxiliary patrol vessel struck a mine of Le Verdon-sur-Mer and was beached.
S-21	Kriegsmarine	World War II: The schnellboot struck a mine and sank in the English Channel west of Cap Gris Nez, Pas-de-Calais, France. She was salvaged in 1941 and returned to service.
S-32	Kriegsmarine	World War II: The schnellboot struck a mine and sank in the English Channel west of Cap Gris Nez.
Saint Palais	France	World War II: The cargo ship was scuttled at Brest. She was refloated in August 1941, repaired and entered German service as Adolf Winter.
San Fernando	United Kingdom	World War II: Convoy HX 49: The tanker was torpedoed and damaged in the Celtic Sea (50°20′N 10°24′W) by U-47 (Kriegsmarine). She was taken in tow but sank the next day. All 49 crew were rescued by HMS Fowey and HMS Sandwich (both Royal Navy).
Vliereede	Kriegsmarine	World War II: The captured ex-Dutch coastal defence ship was bombed and sunk at Den Helder, North Holland by Lockheed Hudson aircraft of 206 Squadron, Royal Air Force. She was later salvaged by the Germans and re-entered service as the anti-aircraft battery ship Ariadne.
Yarraville	United Kingdom	World War II: Convoy 65 X: The tanker was torpedoed and sunk in the Atlantic Ocean south west of Figueira da Foz, Portugal (39°40′N 11°34′W) by U-43 (Kriegsmarine) with the loss of five of her 50 crew. survivors were rescued by the fishing trawler Marie Gilberte (France).

== 22 June ==
List of shipwrecks: 22 June 1940
Ship	State	Description
Amienois	France	World War II: The cargo ship was bombed and sunk at Le Verdon-sur-Mer, Gironde, by Luftwaffe aircraft.
HMY Campeador V	Royal Navy	World War II: The naval yacht struck a mine and sank in the English Channel off Bembridge, Isle of Wight with the loss of twenty of her 21 crew.
Elgo	Sweden	World War II: The cargo ship was torpedoed and sunk in the Mediterranean Sea north of Sfax, Tunisia by Pier Capponi (Regia Marina) with the loss of a crew member.
Eli Knudsen	Norway	World War II: Convoy HX 49: The tanker was torpedoed and damaged in the Atlantic Ocean (50°36′N 8°44′W) by U-32 (Kriegsmarine). All 42 crew were rescued by HMT Agate and HMS Sandwich (both Royal Navy). Eli Knudsen was taken in tow the next day but sank at 50°36′N 7°51′W.
La Bastiase	Free French Naval Forces	World War II: The Flower-class corvette struck a mine in the North Sea off Hartlepool, County Durham, United Kingdom and sank with some loss of life.
Le Fier	French Navy	World War II: The incomplete Le Fier-class torpedo boat struck a mine and sank, or was wrecked the next day, while under tow in the Bay of Biscay off the Île d'Oléron, Charente-Inférieure. She was raised by the Germans and designated TA1.
L'Entreprenant	French Navy	World War II: The incomplete Le Fier-class torpedo boat sank while under tow in the Gironde Estuary. She was raised by the Germans and designated TA4.
Monique	France	World War II: The tanker was torpedoed and sunk in the Bay of Biscay by U-65 (Kriegsmarine) with the loss of all but four of her crew. Survivors were taken as prisoners of war. Monique was on a voyage from Haifa, Palestine to Le Havre, Seine-Inférieure.
Neion	Greece	World War II: The cargo ship was torpedoed and sunk in the Bay of Biscay (47°09′N 4°17′W) by U-38 (Kriegsmarine) with the loss of one of her 28 crew.
Randsfjord	Norway	World War II: Convoy HX 49: The cargo ship was torpedoed and sunk in the Atlantic Ocean 70 nautical miles (130 km) south south east of Queenstown, County Cork, Ireland by U-30 (Kriegsmarine) with the loss of four of her 33 crew. Survivors were rescued by Port Hobart (United Kingdom).

== 23 June ==
List of shipwrecks: 23 June 1940
Ship	State	Description
HMS Coringa	Royal Navy	The rescue tug sank in the Atlantic Ocean from unknown causes.
Émeraude	French Navy	World War II: The Émeraude-class submarine was destroyed incomplete on the slip at Toulon, Var.
HMS Khartoum	Royal Navy	World War II: The K-class destroyer (1,690 GRT) suffered severe damage from explosion of her own torpedoes in their tubes and was beached at Perim, Colony of Aden (12°38′N 43°24′E). One crew was killed and 3 were wounded. She was a total loss and was never repaired.
Kufra	United Kingdom	The cargo ship collided with San Diego ( Vichy France) and sank in the Bay of Biscay off Royan, Charente-inférieure, France (44°11′N 2°00′W).
Le Cherbourgeoise	French Navy	World War II: The patrol boat was scuttled at Le Verdon-sur-Mer, Gironde.
HMIS Pathan	(United Kingdom) Royal Indian Navy	The PC-class corvette was severely damaged by the explosion of her own depth charges, or by Galvani (Regia Marina), in the Indian Ocean off Bombay. She sank the next day at (18°56′N 72°45′E). Seven of her crew were killed.
Torricelli	Regia Marina	World War II: The Brin-class submarine was shelled and sunk in the Red Sea off Perim (12°34′N 43°16′E) by HMS Kandahar, HMS Kingston, HMS Khartoum, HMS Shoreham (all Royal Navy) and HMIS Indus ( (United Kingdom) Royal Indian Navy). Survivors were rescued by HMS Kandahar and HMS Kingston.

== 24 June ==
List of shipwrecks: 24 June 1940
Ship	State	Description
Albuera	United Kingdom	World War II: The tanker was torpedoed and sunk in the English Channel 2 nautical miles (3.7 km) off the Lydd Light Float ( Trinity House) (50°43′16″N 0°40′05″E) by the E-boat S-36 (Kriegsmarine) with the loss of seven of her 36 crew. Merope (Netherlands) rescued the survivors.
Beautemps-Beaupre	French Navy	World War II: The unfinished, 84% complete, Bougainville-class aviso was scuttled in the Gironde Estuary.
Cathrine	Panama	World War II: The cargo ship was torpedoed and sunk in the Atlantic Ocean south west of Ireland (50°08′N 14°00′W) by U-47 (Kriegsmarine). All nineteen crew were rescued.
Galvani	Regia Marina	World War II: The Brin-class submarine was rammed and sunk in the Gulf of Oman (25°55′N 56°55′E) by HMS Falmouth (Royal Navy).
Gamma	Denmark	The auxiliary schooner sank off Sjælland.
Kingfisher	United Kingdom	World War II: The coaster was torpedoed and sunk in the English Channel south of Beachy Head, Sussex (50°30′N 0°28′E) by German motor torpedo boat S-19 (Kriegsmarine) with the loss of a crew member.

== 25 June ==
List of shipwrecks: 25 June 1940
Ship	State	Description
Crux	Norway	World War II: The cargo ship (3,828 GRT) was torpedoed and sunk in the Atlantic Ocean (36°52′N 14°00′W) by UA (Kriegsmarine). All 30 crew survived and were rescued by Brutus (United Kingdom).
HMCS Fraser	Royal Canadian Navy	World War II: Operation Aerial: The C-class destroyer (1,355 GRT) was accidentally rammed and sunk in the Gironde Estuary off Bordeaux, Gironde, France (45°44′N 1°34′W) by HMS Calcutta (Royal Navy) with the loss of 46 of her 145 crew and 18 Royal Navy passengers. HMS Calcutta and HMCS Restigouche (Royal Canadian Navy) rescued the survivors, but one crew of Restigouche drowned during the rescue, and one survivor of Fraser died of his wounds in July.
Harald Schröder	Germany	World War II: The cargo ship struck a mine in the Danish Straits and was beached.
Sainte Marguerite	French Navy	World War II: The auxiliary patrol vessel was scuttled at Le Verdon-sur-Mer, Gironde.
Saranac	United Kingdom	World War II: Convoy OA 172: The tanker was torpedoed and sunk in the Atlantic Ocean 270 miles (430 km) south west of Land's End (48°24′N 15°05′W) by U-51 (Kriegsmarine) with the loss of four of her 44 crew. Survivors were rescued by Ainderby (United Kingdom), 9 by Caliph (United Kingdom) and 30 by HMS Hurricane (Royal Navy).
V 1107 Portland	Kriegsmarine	World War II: The vorpostenboot was torpedoed and sunk in the Norwegian Sea south of Stavanger, Norway (58°54′N 5°05′E) by HMS Snapper (Royal Navy).
Windsorwood	United Kingdom	World War II: Convoy OA 172: The cargo ship was torpedoed and sunk in the Atlantic Ocean south west of Ireland (48°31′N 14°50′W) by U-51 (Kriegsmarine). All 40 crew were rescued by Ainderby (United Kingdom).

== 26 June ==
List of shipwrecks: 26 June 1940
Ship	State	Description
Dimitris	Greece	World War II: The cargo ship (5,254 GRT) was stopped in the Bay of Biscay (44°23′N 11°41′W) by U-29 (Kriegsmarine) and was sunk by gunfire after her crew abandonned her. All survived.
Köln	Germany	The cargo ship ran aground south of Gävle, Sweden. She broke in two and sank the next day.
Loasso	Italy	World War II: The cargo ship (5,968 GRT) on a trip from Venice for Bari with a cargo of coal, struck a mine laid by the British submarine Rorqual, and sank in the Adriatic Sea 3 nautical miles (5.6 km) off Mattinata (41°47′N 16°16′E). The whole crew survived.

== 27 June ==
List of shipwrecks: 27 June 1940
Ship	State	Description
Console Generale Liuzzi	Regia Marina	World War II: The Liuzzi-class submarine (1,166 GRT) was depth charged and heavily damaged in the Mediterranean Sea south of Crete (33°36′N 27°27′E) by HMS Dainty, HMS Decoy, HMS Defender, HMS Ilex (all Royal Navy) and HMAS Voyager (Royal Australian Navy), was forced to surface and was subsequently scuttled. Eleven crew died, including the commanding officer who locked himself to sink with his ship.
Lenda	Norway	World War II: The cargo ship was torpedoed and sunk in the Atlantic Ocean 160 nautical miles (300 km) south west of the Fastnet Rock (50°00′N 13°24′W) by U-47 (Kriegsmarine) with the loss of one of her 26 crew. Survivors were rescued by HMS Havelock and HMS Hurricane (both Royal Navy).
Leticia	Netherlands	World War II: The tanker was shelled and sunk in the Atlantic Ocean 160 nautical miles (300 km) south west of the Fastnet Rock (50°11′N 13°15′W) by U-47 (Kriegsmarine) with the loss of two of her 30 crew. Survivors were rescued by HMS Hurricane (Royal Navy).

== 28 June ==
List of shipwrecks: 28 June 1940
Ship	State	Description
Alicantino	Italy	World War II: The 1,642 GRT cargo ship left Port Mahon, Balearic Islands in the evening of 28 June bound for Cagliari. Never heard from again, presumed lost with all hands some time between 29 and 30 June, possibly in a minefield laid by Saphir (French Navy) outside of Cagliari.
Alessandro Podesta	Italy	World War II: The 633 GRT coaster on a trip from La Maddalena for Porto Torres struck a mine and sank in the Mediterranean Sea about 10 nautical miles (19 km) off Castelsardo, Sardinia (40°59′N 8°34′E).
Argonauta	Regia Marina	World War II: The Argonauta-class submarine was attacked and sunk in the Mediterranean Sea off Cape Ras el Hilal, Libya by HMS Dainty, HMS Decoy, HMS Defender, HMS Ilex and HMS Voyager (D31) (all Royal Navy).
Castleton	United Kingdom	World War II: The fishing trawler was bombed and sunk in the North Sea off the Orkney Islands by a Dornier Do 17Z aircraft of 3 Staffeln, Küstenfliegergruppe 606, Luftwaffe with the loss of all ten crew.
Espero	Regia Marina	World War II: Battle of the Espero Convoy: The Turbine-class destroyer was shelled and sunk in the Mediterranean Sea south west of Crete, Greece (35°18′N 20°12′E) by HMS Gloucester, HMS Liverpool, HMS Neptune, HMS Orion (all Royal Navy) and HMAS Sydney (Royal Australian Navy).
Llanarth	United Kingdom	World War II: The cargo ship was torpedoed and sunk in the Bay of Biscay (47°30′N 10°30′W) by U-35 (Kriegsmarine). All 35 crew were rescued by HMS Gladiolus (Royal Navy).
Maria	Italy	World War II: The 440 GRT coaster was bombed and sunk in the Mediterranean Sea 13 nautical miles (24 km) north of Tobruk by Bristol Blenheim bombers of Royal Air Force.
Paganini	Italy	The 2,427 GRT troopship on a passage for Durazzo suffered an engine room fire, exploded and sank in the Adriatic Sea (41°27′N 19°11′E) with the loss of 147 of the 950 people on board.

== 29 June ==
List of shipwrecks: 29 June 1940
Ship	State	Description
Empire Toucan	United Kingdom	World War II: The cargo ship was torpedoed, shelled and sunk in the Atlantic Ocean south west of Ireland (49°20′N 13°52′W) by U-47 (Kriegsmarine) with the loss of three of her 34 crew. Survivors were rescued by HMS Hurricane (Royal Navy), which scuttled the bow section of the ship.
HNoMS No. 6	Royal Norwegian Navy	The Vosper 60 foot-class motor torpedo boat was sunk in a storm off Beachy Head, Sussex, United Kingdom.
Rubino	Regia Marina	World War II: The Sirena-class submarine was depth charged and sunk in the Ionian Sea, off Santa Maria di Leuca (39°10′N 18°49′E), by a Short Sunderland of 230 Squadron, Royal Air Force.
Uebi Scebeli	Regia Marina	Uebi Scebeli World War II: The Adua-class submarine was depth charged and sunk west of Crete, Greece (35°29′N 20°06′E) by HMS Dainty and HMS Ilex (both Royal Navy).
HMS Willamette Valley	Royal Navy	World War II: The Q-ship was torpedoed and sunk in the Atlantic Ocean south west of Ireland (49°27′N 15°25′W) by U-51 (Kriegsmarine) with the loss of 67 of her 92 crew. Survivors were rescued by Inverlee (United Kingdom).

== 30 June ==
List of shipwrecks: 30 June 1940
Ship	State	Description
Avelona Star	United Kingdom	World War II: Convoy SL 36: The 13,376 GRT ocean liner on a trip from Buenos Aires for London with a cargo of foodstuffs, was torpedoed and damaged in the Atlantic Ocean south west of Land's End, Cornwall (46°59′N 12°17′W) by U-43 (Kriegsmarine) with the loss of three of her crew. Survivors were rescued by Beignon (United Kingdom) and HMS Dunvegan Castle (Royal Navy). Avelona Star sank the next day.
Belmoira	Norway	World War II: The 3,214 GRT cargo ship on a passage from Rufisque for Southampton in ballast, was torpedoed and sunk in the Bay of Biscay (48°15′N 10°30′W) by U-26 (Kriegsmarine). All 25 crew were rescued by the fishing trawlers Miguel Veiga and Weyler No.1 (both Spain).
Empire Seaman	United Kingdom	World War II: The cargo ship was scuttled as a blockship in Churchill Sound, Scapa Flow, Orkney Islands. Her stern, bow, and superstructure were removed in the late 1940s.
Frangoula B. Goulandris	Greece	World War II: The cargo ship was torpedoed and sunk in the Atlantic Ocean west of Land's End, (49°59′N 11°24′W) by U-26 (Kriegsmarine) with the loss of six of her 38 crew.
Georgios Kyriakides	Greece	World War II: The cargo ship was torpedoed and sunk in the Atlantic Ocean south west of Ireland (50°25′N 14°33′W) by U-47 (Kriegsmarine). All 30 crew were rescued.
Mary A. White	United States	The schooner foundered in Massachusetts Bay.
Merkur	Estonia	World War II: The 1,291 GRT cargo ship on a trip from Lisbon for Acton Grange with a cargo of pit props, was torpedoed and sunk in the Atlantic Ocean south west of Land's End (48°26′N 10°58′W) by U-26 (Kriegsmarine) with the loss of four of her crew.
USS SC-185	United States Navy	The SC-1-class submarine chaser was lost to unknown causes.

== Unknown date ==
List of shipwrecks: Unknown date 1940
Ship	State	Description
L'Agile	French Navy	World War II: The incomplete Le Fier-class torpedo boat sank while under tow in the Gironde Estuary. She was later raised by the Germans and designated TA2.
Martinière	France	World War II: The cargo ship was bombed, set afire and severely damaged at Lorient, Morbihan. She was converted to an anti-aircraft artillery ship by the Germans in 1941. She served as a hulk at Saint-Nazaire, Loire-Inférieure 1945–55 and was then scrapped.
Sidney O. Neff	United States	The barge sank at Menominee, Wisconsin, United States.
U-122	Kriegsmarine	World War II: The Type IXB submarine disappeared in the North Sea on or after 21 June with the loss of all 56 crew.
