= French submarine La Praya =

French submarine La Praya may refer to:

- French submarine La Praya (Q198), a Roland Morillot-class submarine cancelled in 1940
- French submarine La Praya (S622), an Agosta-class submarine operated between 1978 and 2000
