= French submarine Bévéziers =

Two submarines of the French Navy have borne the name Bévéziers:

- French submarine Bévéziers (1935), a Redoutable-class submarine launched in 1935 and sunk in 1942
- French submarine Bévéziers (S621), an Agosta-class submarine completed in 1977 and stricken in 1998
