= French submarine Doris (S643) =

French submarine, 1964–1994

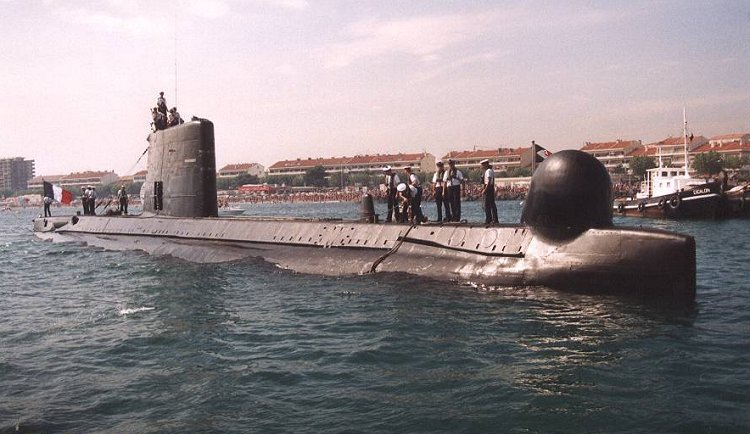
- Doris in 1994

History

France
- Name: Doris
- Namesake: Doris, a sea goddess in Greek mythology
- Builder: Direction des Constructions et Armes Navales, Cherbourg, France
- Laid down: 1 September 1958
- Launched: 14 May 1960
- Commissioned: 26 August 1964
- Decommissioned: 18 November 1994
- Home port: Toulon, France
- Identification: S643
- Fate: Condemned 20 August 1996; Sank 25 June 1999

General characteristics
- Class & type: Daphné-class submarine
- Displacement: 869 tonnes (855 long tons) surfaced; 1,043 tonnes (1,027 long tons) submerged
- Length: 57.75 m (189 ft 6 in)
- Beam: 6.74 m (22 ft 1 in)
- Draught: 5.25 m (17 ft 3 in)
- Propulsion: Diesel-electric, two shafts, 1,600 shp (1,193 kW)
- Speed: Submerged: 16 knots (30 km/h; 18 mph); Snorkeling: 8 knots (15 km/h; 9.2 mph); Surfaced: 12 knots (22 km/h; 14 mph)
- Range: Surfaced: 10,000 nmi (18,500 km; 11,500 mi) at 7 knots (13 km/h; 8.1 mph)
- Endurance: 30 days
- Test depth: 300 m (984 ft)

Doris (S643), the third French Navy submarine of the name, was one of eleven of the Daphné class of "high-performance submarines." She was in commission from 1964 to 1994.

== Construction, trials, and commissioning ==
=== Keel-laying and launch ===
Doris was laid down by Direction des Constructions et Armes Navales at Cherbourg, France, on 1 September 1958. She was Launched on 14 May 1960 with a substantial crowd in attendance, including Minister of the Armed Forces Pierre Messmer, Ministerial Delegate for the Navy Guillaume Le Bigot, and the widow of the commanding officer of the first Doris (Q135), lost along with his entire crew when a German U-boat sank his submarine in 1940.

=== 1961 ===
On 2 August 1961, Doris put to sea for the first time, leaving Cherbourg to begin lengthy sea trials and testing which lasted for over three years. In September 1961, she again got underway from Cherbourg, called at Lorient Submarine Base in Lorient, France, on 13 September to bring aboard a new commanding officer, and then arrived at Brest, France, on 16 September. She then returned to Cherbourg, but departed again to make a port call at Bordeaux, France, from 13 to 16 October 1961 before again returning to Cherbourg.

=== 1962 ===
After a visit by the Higher Test Commission, Doris departed Cherbourg on 2 June 1962 bound for Toulon, France. She made a cruise from Toulon from 2 to 19 July 1962. On 31 July 1962, she departed Toulon in company with her sister ships Daphne and Diane, the submarine Aréthuse, and the submarine tender Gustave Zédé for a cruise in the Eastern Mediterranean during which they called at İzmir, Turkey, from 13 to 17 August; Mykonos, a Greek island in the Cyclades in the Aegean Sea, on 19 August; Piraeus, Greece, from 20 to 24 August; and Corfu from 25 to 26 August before returning to Toulon on 3 September 1962.

A series of cruises from Toulon followed. Doris returned from the first of them on 12 October 1962, the second on 12 November, and the third on 17 November 1962. She made her final cruise from Toulon of 1962 from 26 November to 1 December.

=== 1963 ===
Doris continued her outings from Toulon in 1963, making the first two from 5 to 14 and the second from 21 to 26 January. During herthird cruise, she conducted exercises in the Mediterranean Sea off Provence, then made a port call at Valencia, Spain, from 14 to 18 February 1963 before her return to Toulon on 23 February. She was at sea again from 25 February to 2 March 1963, then made another cruise from Toulon, returning on 1 April 1963. Doris next proceeded from Toulon to Lorient, which she reached on 12 April 1963. She put to sea from Lorient on 17 April 1963, then returned. On 14 May 1963, she arrived at Liverpool, England, then returned to Lorient on 19 May. She then proceeded to Mers-el-Kébir in Algeria, where she arrived on May 27, 1963, before returning to Toulon.

Doris next departed Toulon on 5 July 1963. After her return, she took aboard a new commanding officer on 20 July 1963, then began another cruise from Toulon on 22 July. She continued her schedule of cruises from Toulon, making her next one from 2 to 13 September 1963, followed by one which saw her return to Toulon on 5 October 1963. She got underway again on 28 October 1963 bound for Genoa, Italy, where she called from 31 October to 4 November 1963 before heading back to Toulon. She rounded out her 1963 activities with two more cruises from Toulon, from 18 to 23 November followed by one from which she returned on 30 November.

=== 1964 ===
In 1964, Doris continued her operations from Toulon, departing on 12 January, making another cruise from 20 to 25 January 1964, and yet another which she concluded on 31 January 1964. She made a visit to Palma de Mallorca in the Balearic Islands that began on 7 February 1964, a cruise from Toulon that lasted from 24 to 27 March 1964, and arrived in Livorno, Italy, on 5 April 1964, and got underway from Toulon on 13 April and again on 11 May 1964. During a cruise from Toulon that began on 18 April, she took part in the "Fair Game II" exercise. After completing another cruise that began on 25 May 1964, she put to sea from Toulon on 1 June 1964 to take part in Operation Tramontane between Provence and the Balearic Islands, then called at Barcelona, Spain, from 11 to 16 June before proceeding to Toulon. She then made another cruise from Toulon that ended on 21 August 1964. The French Navy finally deemed Doris′s pre-acceptance trials complete, and on 26 August 1964 she was commissioned.

== Commissioned service ==
Doris spent her entire career based at Toulon, France, as a unit of the Mediterranean Submarine Squadron. Upon commissioning, she was assigned to the 1st Submarine Squadron.

=== 1964–1965 ===
Doris returned to Toulon from her first post-commissioning cruise on 28 August and from her second on 4 September 1964. A new commanding officer reported aboard on 12 September. She departed Toulon for her next cruise on 3 October 1964.

On 12 October 1964, Doris got underway from Toulon to take part in the "Lavezzi Deux" exercise between 6 and 23 October. Her next cruise began on 19 October, and she also put to sea from Toulon 25 October, returning on 26 October. On 19 November 1964, Doris departed Toulon to participate with and her sister ship Minerve in an interallied exercise off Sardinia from 23 November to 2 December 1964. The two submarines then called at Civitavecchia, Italy, from 2 to 6 December 1964 before returning to Toulon. Doris's activities for 1964 ended with a cruise from Toulon that she completed on 11 December 1964.

Doris began her operations in 1965 by departing Toulon in company with her sister ship Eurydice on 18 January. The two submarines made a stop at Nice, France, from 20 to 21 January before arriving at Toulon on 22 January. Doris then made a cruise from Toulon from 24 January to 6 February 1965, and on 8 March 1965 got back underway to take part in the "Cartha" cruise in the Western Mediterranean and make a port call at Cartagena, Spain, before she returned to Toulon on 27 March 1965. On 5 April 1965, she began a major refit at Toulon.

=== 1966 ===
On 1 February 1966, Doris′s refit was completed. She departed Toulon on 7 February and again on 14 February for post-refit trials.

With her trials complete, Doris resumed operations from Toulon. She made her first post-refit cruise from 21 to 26 February 1966, her second from 4 to 19 March, and her third from 25 to 29 April 1966. She got underway again on 3 May 1966 for trials and individual training and called at Ajaccio, France, from 7 to 9 May before returning to Toulon on 12 May 1966. She participated in the 1966 "Paso Doble" summer cruise from 13 June to 23 July, during which she took part in the "Fado" exercise. She called at Lisbon, Portugal, from 29 June to 4 July; at Cádiz, Spain, from 6 to 10 July; and at Málaga, Spain, from 10 to 13 July before returning to Toulon on 23 July 1966.

After a new commanding officer took command on 6 August 1966, Doris made two cruises from Toulon, the first from 22 August to 7 September 1966, followed by another she completed on 24 September. She next departed Toulon on 12 November 1966 for various exercises in the Mediterranean Sea. After a port call at Palermo, Italy, planned for 14 to 17 November was cancelled, took part with the French Mediterranean Squadron in Operation Émaux, which was scheduled for 15 November to 20 December 1966. On 25 November 1966 at approximately 19:30, she was involved in a violent collision with the Soviet tanker Stanislav when she came to periscope depth in the Mediterranean Sea off Toulon. The collision did not cause any injuries, but Doris suffered significant damage, causing the misalignment of her No. 11 and No. 12 torpedo tubes and leaks in her port aft ballast tank and at her steering rod mechanism. She returned to Toulon on 27 November 1966.

=== 1967–1969 ===
After completing repairs, Doris returned to sea on 9 January 1967 for a cruise from Toulon that lasted until 13 January. Her next cruise was from 16 to 28 January 1967. She then participated in parts of Operation Camées, which took place in the Mediterranean Sea and Atlantic Ocean from 30 January to 7 March 1967, putting to sea from Toulon on 1 February and then getting underway from Toulon a second time and returning on 11 March 1967. She then made a cruise from that began on 9 April 1967. After a new commanding officer reported aboard on 6 May 1967, she spent the rest of 1967 taking part in Exercise "Exmix", Exercise "Fair Game Alpha/Charlie", and other exercises.

In 1968, Doris conducted a cruise from which she returned on 29 April, and another from 6 to 11 May. She later departed Toulon for training along the coast of Provence and in the Mediterranean Sea and made a port call at Livorno, Italy, from 10 to 14 September before returning to Toulon on 15 September 1968. During September 1968 she also conducted training with navalcommandos of the 2nd Company of the Fusiliers Marins Commandos Group. On 28 October 1968, she departed Toulon for trials, and she visited Malta from 4 to 6 November 1968 with her sister ship Junon, returning to Toulon on 9 November. She carried out a safety pellet release test on 25 November 1968 which took place without problems, the release occurring four seconds after the order to conduct it. A new commanding officer took command of Doris on 27 November 1968.

Doris got underway off from Toulon on 20 October 1969 for exercises, then returned on 26 October. She then began a major refit at Toulon.

=== 1970–1973 ===
After completion of her refit in early 1970, Doris left Toulon on 1 June 1970 for exercises. She visited Athens, Greece, from 18 to 23 June, then returned to Toulon on 28 June. She again departed Toulon on 27 July 1970 to conduct a series of trials on the coast of Provence, also calling at Port Vendres from 31 July to 3 August before returning to Toulon on 7 August 1970. After another change of command on 2 October, she took part in the Franco-Spanish "Murcia" exercise in the Mediterranean Sea from 23 to 29 October 1970.

On 11 January 1971 Doris and the submarine Morse got underway from Toulon for various trials on the coast of Provence. They returned on 16 January. On 1 February 1971, Doris and the submarine Ariane for a similar cruise various trials and exercises on the coast of Provence. They returned on 5 February 1971. Doris later conducted exercises in the Corsica area until 19 May 19cruise 71, when she began a port call at Livorno, Italy, that lasted until 22 May. She returned to Toulon on 29 May 1971. On 19 June she took part in a fleet review attended by President of France Georges Pompidou.

Doris departed Toulon on 29 July 1971 for exercises, during which she visited Heraklion, Greece, from 24 to 29 August 1971. From 7 to 9 October and again from 18 to 23 October 1971, Doris and the submarine Argonaute conducted various trials and exercises together. Doris again conducted various trials from 26 to 29 October 1971, and she carried out various trials off Provence from 12 to 22 December 1971.

From 3 to 5 January 1972, Doris and Junon carried out exercises together. Doris and Morse conducted a command course at sea together from 14 to 18 February 1972, and Doris conducted another command course at sea from 21 to 26 February. She carried out exercises from 28 February to 3 March 1972. She later took part with the Mediterranean Squadron in Operation Dawn Patrol until 14 May 1972, when she resumed her individual training. She and Junon visited Naples, Italy, from 17 to 20 May 1972 before returning to Toulon on 22 May. A new commanding officer took command on 23 May.

Doris began a major overhaul at Toulon at the beginning of 1973 which lasted into 1974.

=== 1974–1977 ===
After the completion of her overhaul in early 1974, Doris put to sea from 4 to 10 March 1974 for post-overhaul exercises. She again returned to Toulon on 14 June 1974 after she and her sister ship Dianetook part in an aviation contest. Exercises followed, from which she returned on 28 June, and she again was at sea for exercises from 16 to 19 July 1974. On 29 July 1974, she got underway from Toulon to take part in an aviation exercise, and she called at L'Île-Rousse, Corsica, from 3 to 6 August before returning to Toulon on 9 August 1974. Her final activity of 1974 was her participation in the "Campanule" exercise, from which she returned on 20 December.

On 10 January 1975, a new commanding officer took command, and at the time it was noted that under her outgoing commanding officer, who had reported aboard on 22 May 1972, Doris had traveled 16,000 nautical miles (29,600 km; 18,400 mi) and fired 98 torpedoes. During the change-of-command ceremony, a quartermaster in her crew received a letter of congratulations from the minister of the navy for "proof of courage during assistance to a person in danger." Doris spent 1975 participating in the "Fénec" and "Dogfish" exercises.

Another change of command took place on 10 February 1976. Under her new commanding officer, Doris too part in numerous exercises and training activities during 1976. She sank the decommissioned submarine tender Gustave Zédé as a target at 11:25 on 26 February 1976 in 2,149 metres (7,051 ft) of water in the Mediterranean Sea south of Marseille, France, at 42°30′N 005°24′E with an E14 torpedo. Doris put to sea on 20 April 1976 with her sister ship Flore for a command course at sea, during which the submarines visited Palma de Mallorca on 25 April. On 11 July 1976, Doris took part in a naval review attended by French President Valéry Giscard d'Estaing. At the beginning of October 1976, Doris and helicopters from the naval base at Saint-Mandrier-sur-Mer, France, took part in the antisubmarine warfare component of combined air defense and antisubmarine exercises. During October, she conducted exercises with both the French Commander-in-Chief, Mediterranean and the commander of French Navy attack submarines aboard. On 22 November 1976, Minister of the Armed Forces Yvon Bourges made a dive aboard Doris.

In 1977, Doris got underway from Toulon and visited Heraklion, Crete, on 7 March before making a port call at İzmir, Turkey, until 14 March and returning to Toulon on 20 March. She departed Toulon in company with her sister ship Daphné on 3 May 1977, and the two submarines visited Palma de Mallorca on 13 May before returning to Toulon on 21 May. On 9 June 1977, a new commanding officer reported aboard, and in July 1977 Doris took part in Operation Portes Ouvertes at the Toulon Arsenal. She departed Toulon in October 1977, and after a stop at Santa Cruz de Tenerife on Tenerife in the Canary Islands on 8 October ad on 17 October 1977 arrived at Cherbourg, where a boat manned by commanding officers and executive officers of the submarines of the Mediterranean Squadron greeted her. She began a major overhaul at Cherbourg expected to last approximately a year, part of an initiative to increase the workload of the shipyard there by transferring refit and overhaul work from Toulon.

=== 1978–1982 ===
After the completion of her overhaul, Doris moved to Lorient, from which she departed for post-overhaul trials. She returned to Lorient on 6 November 1978. On 4 January 1979 she departed Cherbourg and, after a stop at Malaga, Spain, arrived at Toulon on 23 January. She then resumed operations from Toulon, conducting a cruise from 4 to 10 February 1979 and getting underway with Diane on 25 March 1979 for a command course at sea. After a stopover at Palma de Mallorca on 6 April, the submarines returned to Toulon on 14 April 1979. Her next cruise from Toulon ended with her return on 26 May 1979. She got underway from Toulon on 5 June 1979 and visited L'Île-Rousse from 7 to 11 June before returning to Toulon on 15 June 1979. She departed Toulon on 21 August 1979 bound for Syracuse, Sicily, where she made a port call from 30 August to 2 September 1979 before getting back underway and arriving at Toulon on 7 September 1979. After a change of command on 10 September 1979, she made a cruise to Nice, departing Toulon on 7 November, calling at Nice from 9 to 12 November, and returning to Toulon on 16 November 1979.

In April 1980, Doris and Diane took part in submarine command courses at sea. Doris next conducted a patrol during which she visited İzmir, Turkey, on 15 June 1980. Two more cruises from Toulon followed, the first concluding on 26 July and the second on 8 August 1980.

In 1981, Doris made a cruise to Palermo, Sicily, which she visited from 13 to 17 March before returning to Toulon on 19 March. A new commanding officer reported aboard on 26 March 1981, and from 3 to 9 May 1981 Doris was at sea with Daphné on a qualification cruise. From 16 August to 16 September 1981, Doris conducted a patrol, during which she made a port call at Alexandra, Egypt, from 2 to 8 September. She again was at sea from 12 to 25 November 1981 to participate in the "Iles d'Or" exercise.

On 24 January 1982, Doris got underway with the submarine Bévéziers for a command course at sea. She stopped at Palma de Mallorca on 4 February 1982 before returning to Toulon. On 26 March 1982, she departed Toulon to take part in the "Dogfish" exercise and called at Naples, Italy, on 13 April before returning to Toulon. She again put to sea from Toulon from 20 to 22 April and 15 to 17 June 1982 for the CPESM competition. On 14 July 1982, she took part in a Bastille Day naval review attended by French President François Mitterrand and Minister of the Armed Forces Charles Hernu. She set out from Toulon for a training cruise on 2 August 1982, followed by another such cruise from 8 to 11 September 1982. A new commanding officer took command of Doris on 29 September 1982.

=== 1983–1984 ===
In early October 1983, Doris got underway from Toulon to conduct a series of exercises in the Mediterranean Sea. On 22 October 1983 at 04:10, she was on the surface making 8 knots (15 km/h; 9.2 mph) a few nautical miles from Sète — a port in Southern France where she was scheduled to make a routine stopover that day — when an extremely violent explosion occurred in the battery room, killing instantly two sailors in the compartment and inflicting significant damage. Five other crewmen were injured, two of them seriously, including Doris′s commanding officer. Doris had experienced a succession of incidents concerning the level of hydrogen gas in the battery compartment and inadequate ventilation of the compartment, and the explosion was attributed to an untimely reaction between the hydrogen emitted by the batteries while under charge and the oxygen in the air aboard Doris after a failure of control devices or the ventilation system. The explosion was followed by a fire that Doris′s crew quickly brought under control. The maritime prefecture of Toulon radioed the gendarmerie of Montpellier, France, which dispatched a helicopter which hoisted two injured men aboard and took them to the hospital at Sète. Despite his injuries, the commanding officer refused evacuation and supervised rescue and safety activities until Doris reached port at Sète, which she did under her own power.

After repairs, Doris conducted post-repair trials in May 1984 and from 4 to 8 June 1984 she carried out qualification activities. After their completion, she returned to operations from Toulon, departing on a cruise during which she made a stop at La Maddalena, Sardinia, then got back underway on 20 June and arrived at Toulon on 22 June 1984. In August and September 1984 she was in training. She made a port call at Oran, Algeria, from 9 to 11 September 1984. During her cruise her second engineer became violently ill with pain, apparently due to an ulcer. The Italian Navy sent a float-equipped helicopter to pick up the man, but it sustained damage and sank while attempting to land on the sea near Doris, seriously injuring its pilot. Doris rescued the helicopter's four-man crew, and the Italian Navy dispatched another helicopter and a launch to rendezvous with Doris pick up the French sailor and the Italian helicopter crew. The helicopter pilot died during the trip, but the French sailor recovered in a hospital ashore. Doris returned to Toulon on 15 September 1984. Doris Agan was at sea from 27 October to 3 November, and she completed her activities for 1984 by completing another cruise from Toulon on 31 December.

=== 1985–1994 ===
Doris made a visit to Malaga, Spain, from 27 February to 3 March 1985. A new commanding officer reported aboard on 23 April 1985.

In 1986, Doris made a cruise from Toulon that concluded on 21 February. She again was at sea from 24 February to 3 March 1986, and during her cruise took part in the "La Playa' competition from 1 to 3 March. She received a new commanding officer on 11 July 1986, and in November 1986 she held an open house for visitors as part of a centennial celebration of the submarine force. She visited Nice on 13 and 14 December 1986.

Doris participated in the NATO "Dogfish 87" exercise in April 1987, during which she made a four-day visit to Dubrovnik, Yugoslavia. From 1 to 12 May 1987, she took part with the submarine Ouessant, the aviso Commandant Ducuing, and the corvette Dupleix in a training course for future submarine commanders, during which the vessels called at Mallorca in the Balearic Islands from 5 to 7 May. Doris participated in the Franco-American exercise "Louisiane" from 14 to 20 November and in France's first annual AMF Téléthon for muscular dystrophy from 4 to 5 December 1987.

New commanding officers reported aboard Doris on 21 July 1988 and 25 September 1990. From 9 to 18 June 1992, she participated along with British, Italian, and Spanish ships in the joint exercise "Farfadet 92" in the Mediterranean Sea. After another change of command on 22 July 1992, she visited Nice from 14 to 16 March 1993. She departed Toulon on 3 June 1993, arrived at Marseille on 6 June to participate in Marseille Sea Week, and then returned to Toulon. She visited Malaga, Spain, from 1 to 4 July 1993 and Antibes, France, from 9 to 10 October 1993. On 21 October 1993, she began her participation in the combined exercise "Ardente", which took place in the Mediterranean Sea and also involved ships of the navies of Belgium, Germany, Greece, the Netherlands, and the United Kingdom.

From 21 to 25 January 1994, Doris visited Malaga, Spain. Her final change of command occurred on 8 March 1994. On 13 August 1994 she got underway from Toulon to participate in the "Fiftieth Anniversary of the Landings in Provence" celebration — a commemoration of Operation Dragoon, the Allied amphibious landings in Southern France on 15 August 1944 during World War II — and in a naval review at Villefranche, France, on 14 August 1994. She returned to Toulon on 16 September 1994. Doris made her final dive on 23 September 1994 with her former commanding officers aboard for the occasion.

== Final disposition ==
Doris was decommissioned on 18 November 1994. She was condemned on 20 August 1996, then designated for use as a target.

On 25 June 1999, Doris′s hulk accidentally sank with no one aboard in 939 metres (3,081 ft) of water in the Mediterranean Sea off France's Levant Island at 43.1028333°N 006.5726667°E while being submerged to a shallow depth for use as a target in a test firing of the new MU90 Impact antisubmarine torpedo.

== See also ==
- List of submarines of France
