= German submarine tender Saar =

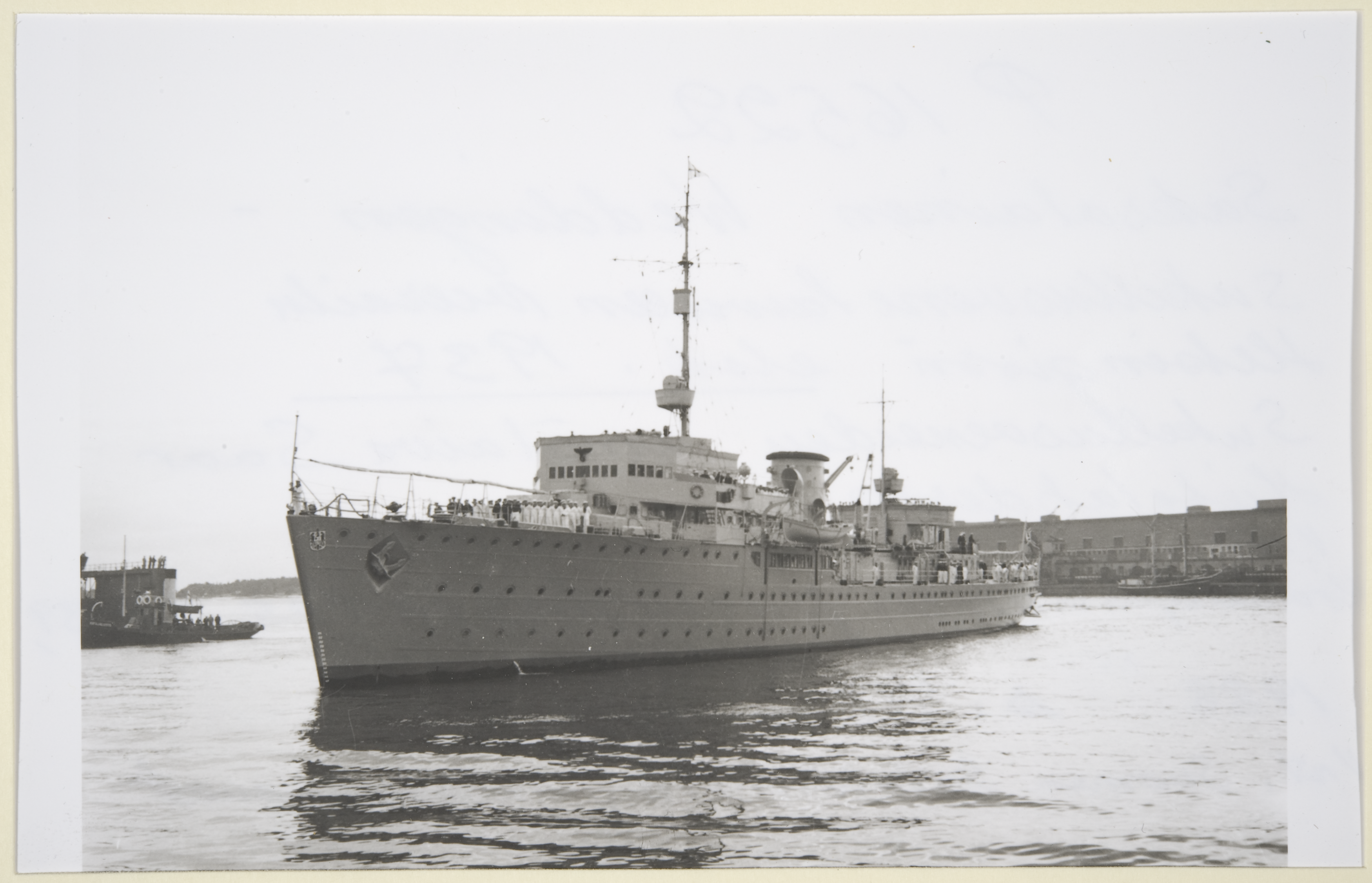
- Saar visiting Helsinki in 1937.

History

Nazi Germany
- Name: Saar
- Namesake: Saar
- Builder: Germaniawerft, Kiel
- Laid down: 19 September 1933
- Launched: 5 April 1934
- Commissioned: 1 October 1934
- Decommissioned: May 1945
- Fate: Captured by United States, May 1945; Transferred to France, 1947

France
- Name: Gustave Zédé
- Commissioned: 17 January 1948
- Decommissioned: 15 February 1971
- Identification: A641/Q481
- Fate: Sunk as target 26 February 1976

General characteristics
- Type: Submarine tender
- Displacement: 3,250 metric tons of loaded displacement; 2,710 metric tons of standard displacement
- Length: 100.5 m (329 ft 9 in) o/a; 99.8 m (327 ft 5 in) w/l
- Beam: 13.55 m (44 ft 5 in)
- Draught: 4.63 m (15 ft 2 in)
- Propulsion: 2 × Krupp 8-cylinder diesel engines
- Speed: 18.3 knots (33.9 km/h; 21.1 mph)
- Complement: 232
- Armament: 1933: 3 × 10.5 cm (4 in) SK C/24 guns; 2 × single 2 cm Flak 30 anti-aircraft guns; 1944: 3 × 10.5 cm SK C/32 guns; 2 × single 3.7 cm M42U AA guns; 3 × single 2 cm Flak 38 AA guns; 1948: 3 × 10.5 cm SK C/32 guns; 2 × single Bofors 40 mm AA guns; 1 × quadruple Oerlikon 20 mm cannon; 1952: 3 × 10.5 cm SK C/32 guns; 4 × single Bofors 40 mm AA guns; 1 × quadruple Oerlikon 20 mm cannon

Saar was the first purpose-built submarine tender of the German Kriegsmarine, and served throughout World War II. She later served in the post-war French Navy as Gustave Zédé.

== Construction and specifications ==
The ship was laid down on 19 September 1933 at the Friedrich Krupp Germaniawerft shipyard in Kiel and was launched on 5 April 1934. She was commissioned on 1 October 1934 and completed sea trials on 26 November.

The ship was 100.5 m (329 ft 9 in) in length overall (99.8 m (327 ft 5 in) at the waterline), 13.55 m (44 ft 5 in) in the beam, and had a draught of 4.63 m (15 ft 2 in). She displaced 2,710 tonnes (standard) and 3,250 tonnes (fully loaded). Two Krupp 8-cylinder diesel engines gave Saar a top speed of 18.3 knots (33.9 km/h; 21.1 mph). The crew consisted of 232 men.

The ship was originally armed with three 10.5 cm (4 in) SK C/24 guns and two single 2 cm (1 in) Flak 30 anti-aircraft guns. In 1944, the three main guns were replaced by the newer 10.5 cm SK C/32 guns and anti-aircraft armament replaced with two single 37 mm M42U and three 2 cm Flak 38.

== German service ==
After completion of sea trials and short-term use as a target ship, Saar was assigned to the U-Boot-Abwehrschule ("Submarine Defence School") in Kiel-Wik, where submarine officers were trained. In 1935 she became tender to the Weddigen Flotilla (later the 1st U-boat Flotilla), commanded by Fregattenkapitän Karl Dönitz, in Kiel. On 6 October 1937, she was transferred to the Saltzwedel Flotilla (2nd U-boat Flotilla) at Wilhelmshaven. From July 1940, the ship served in the Baltic with the 21st, 25th, 26th and 27th U-boat Flotillas in Pillau and Gotenhafen. Towards the end of the war she was used as an accommodation ship by FdU East.

== French service ==
At the end of the war in 1945 the ship was captured by United States forces at Bremen, and in 1947 the vessel was given to France as war reparations. Saar was sailed by a German crew to Cherbourg, where on 17 January 1948 the vessel was recommissioned as Gustave Zédé (A641) of the French Navy. The main armament was retained, but the anti-aircraft guns were replaced by two single Bofors 40 mm guns and a quadruple Oerlikon 20 mm cannon. After sea trials, she received further modifications, and on 13 May 1949 arrived at her new home port of Toulon, where the Groupe d'Action Sous-Marine (GASM), the French submarine command, was based.

Until 15 December 1970, the ship, affectionately nicknamed "Tatave", was active in the Mediterranean as a submarine tender. She accompanied submarines in a large number of manoeuvres and training cruises, and also took part in the operations at Suez in 1956, transported relief supplies to Agadir after the 1960 earthquake, and took part in the evacuation of Bizerte in 1961.

She was refitted at Marseille in 1951, receiving upgrades to her mast, armament (two additional 40 mm Bofors were fitted) and electronics, at Toulon in 1955 (armament, electronics), and at Sidi Abdallah/Menzel Bourguiba in 1958/59 (bridge, electronics).

On 15 February 1971 Gustave Zédé was transferred to the Fleet Reserve, and on 29 June 1971, was renumbered Q481. From 1972 to 1976 she was used as a target ship during the development of the MM38 Exocet anti-ship missile.

At 11:25 on 26 February 1976, the submarine Doris sank Gustave Zédé as a target with an E14 torpedo in the Mediterranean Sea south of Marseille in position 42°30′N 5°24′E. The wreck lies at a depth of 2,149 metres (7,051 ft).

== See also ==
- List of naval ships of Germany
- SS Saar
- French submarine Gustave Zédé (1893)
