= German submarine U-51 (1938) =

German World War II submarine

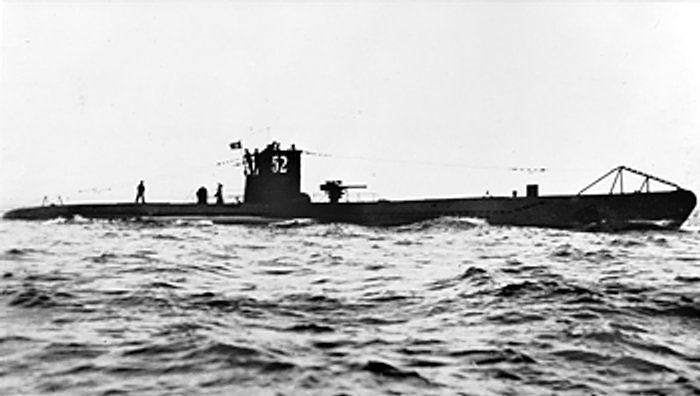
- U-52, a typical Type VIIB boat

History

Nazi Germany
- Name: U-51
- Ordered: 21 November 1936
- Builder: Germaniawerft AG, Kiel
- Cost: 4,439,000 Reichsmark
- Yard number: 586
- Laid down: 26 February 1937
- Launched: 11 June 1938
- Commissioned: 6 August 1938
- Fate: Sunk, 20 August 1940

General characteristics
- Class & type: Type VIIB U-boat
- Displacement: 753 t (741 long tons) surfaced; 857 t (843 long tons) submerged
- Length: 66.50 m (218 ft 2 in) o/a; 48.80 m (160 ft 1 in) pressure hull
- Beam: 6.20 m (20 ft 4 in) o/a; 4.70 m (15 ft 5 in) pressure hull
- Draught: 4.74 m (15 ft 7 in)
- Installed power: 2,800–3,200 PS (2,100–2,400 kW; 2,800–3,200 bhp) (diesels); 750 PS (550 kW; 740 shp) (electric)
- Propulsion: 2 shafts; 2 × diesel engines; 2 × electric motors
- Speed: 17.9 knots (33.2 km/h; 20.6 mph) surfaced; 8 knots (15 km/h; 9.2 mph) submerged
- Range: 8,700 nmi (16,112 km; 10,012 mi) at 10 knots (19 km/h; 12 mph)surfaced; 90 nmi (170 km; 100 mi) at 4 knots (7.4 km/h; 4.6 mph)
- Test depth: 230 m (750 ft); Calculated crush depth: 250–295 m (820–968 ft)
- Complement: 4 officers, 40–56 enlisted
- Sensors & processing systems: Gruppenhorchgerät
- Armament: 5 × 53.3 cm (21 in) torpedo tubes (four bow, one stern); 14 × torpedoes or 26 TMA mines; 1 × 8.8 cm (3.46 in) deck gun (220 rounds); 1 × 2 cm (0.79 in) C/30 anti-aircraft gun

Service record
- Part of: 7th U-boat Flotilla; 6 August 1938 – 20 August 1940
- Identification codes: M 05 671
- Commanders: Kptlt. Ernst-Günther Heinicke; 6 August 1938 – August 1939; Kptlt. Dietrich Knorr; 15 January – 20 August 1940
- Operations: 4 patrols: 1st patrol: 17 January – 8 February 1940; 2nd patrol: 11 March – 22 April 1940; 3rd patrol: 6 June – 5 July 1940; 4th patrol: 9 – 20 August 1940
- Victories: 5 merchant ships sunk (26,296 GRT); 1 auxiliary warship sunk (4,724 GRT)

German submarine U-51 was a Type VIIB U-boat of Nazi Germany's Kriegsmarine that operated during World War II. She was ordered on 21 November 1936 and laid down on 26 February 1937 in Kiel. She was launched on 11 June 1938 and commissioned on 6 August 1938.

During her service in the Kriegsmarine, U-51 conducted four war patrols and sank five enemy vessels for a loss of 26,296 gross register tons (GRT) and one auxiliary warship of 4,724 GRT. She was a member of one wolfpack.

She was sunk on 20 August 1940 in the Bay of Biscay by a torpedo from a British submarine.

== Design ==
German Type VIIB submarines were preceded by the shorter Type VIIA submarines. U-51 had a displacement of 753 tonnes (741 long tons) when at the surface and 857 tonnes (843 long tons) while submerged. She had a total length of 66.50 m (218 ft 2 in), a pressure hull length of 48.80 m (160 ft 1 in), a beam of 6.20 m (20 ft 4 in), a height of 9.50 m (31 ft 2 in), and a draught of 4.74 m (15 ft 7 in). The submarine was powered by two MAN M 6 V 40/46 four-stroke, six-cylinder supercharged diesel engines producing a total of 2,800 to 3,200 metric horsepower (2,060 to 2,350 kW; 2,760 to 3,160 shp) for use while surfaced, two BBC GG UB 720/8 double-acting electric motors producing a total of 750 metric horsepower (550 kW; 740 shp) for use while submerged. She had two shafts and two 1.23 m (4 ft) propellers. The boat was capable of operating at depths of up to 230 metres (750 ft).

The submarine had a maximum surface speed of 17.9 knots (33.2 km/h; 20.6 mph) and a maximum submerged speed of 8 knots (15 km/h; 9.2 mph). When submerged, the boat could operate for 90 nautical miles (170 km; 100 mi) at 4 knots (7.4 km/h; 4.6 mph); when surfaced, she could travel 8,700 nautical miles (16,100 km; 10,000 mi) at 10 knots (19 km/h; 12 mph). U-51 was fitted with five 53.3 cm (21 in) torpedo tubes (four fitted at the bow and one at the stern), fourteen torpedoes, one 8.8 cm (3.46 in) SK C/35 naval gun, 220 rounds, and one 2 cm (0.79 in) anti-aircraft gun The boat had a complement of between forty-four and sixty.

== Service history ==
U-51 was ordered by the Kriegsmarine on 21 November 1936 (as part of Plan Z and in violation of the Treaty of Versailles). She was laid down on 15 September 1938 by Friedrich Krupp Germaniawerft AG, in Kiel as yard number 586. U-51 was launched on 11 June 1938 and commissioned on 6 August of that same year under the command of Kapitänleutnant (Kptlt.) Ernst-Günther Heinicke.

After being commissioned and deployed, U-51 was stationed in the German port of Kiel. This city was to be her home for the rest of her brief career.

During her service with the Kriegsmarine, she took part in four combat patrols. She joined the 7th U-boat Flotilla on 6 August 1938. She was to remain a part of this flotilla until her loss.

=== First patrol ===
The first of U-51's four patrols began on 17 January 1940 when she left Kiel and crossed the North Sea. She negotiated the 'gap' between the Orkney and Shetland Islands and claimed her first success 45 nautical miles (83 km; 52 mi) west of Rockall when she sank the Gothia on 22 January. Moving south down the west coast of Ireland, she encountered the Eika west of the Scilly Isles on the 29th and sent her to the bottom. After sailing between the Scottish islands once more, but in the opposite direction, the boat docked at Wilhelmshaven on 8 February after 23 days at sea.

=== Second patrol ===
The main incident of note on the submarine's second sortie was when the French submarine Orphée launched two torpedoes at her in the North Sea at 57°N 005°E on 21 April 1940. They missed. The rest of the patrol was carried out parallel to the Norwegian coast.

=== Third patrol ===
For her third foray, the boat entered the Atlantic after passing between the Faroe and Shetland Islands. Having left Kiel on 6 June 1940, she sank the Saranc on the 26th about 270 nautical miles (500 km; 310 mi) west southwest of Lands End. U-51 went on to sink the Q-ship HMS Edgehill on the 29th. This ship, used as a decoy, was formidably armed with nine 4-inch guns and four torpedo tubes. Her ballast was given extra buoyancy which meant three 'eels' (U-boat slang for torpedoes), were needed to dispose of the vessel, which still took over an hour to sink.

=== Fourth patrol ===
The boat departed Kiel on 9 August 1940. She sank the Sylviafield about 190 nautical miles (350 km; 220 mi) west northwest of Rockall. There were 36 survivors, of which 20 were picked up by the Belgian trawler Rubens and landed at Fleetwood on the English west coast. The remainder were recovered by another trawler which was under British Admiralty control and named HMS Newland. Her human cargo was discharged at Tobermory, Isle of Mull.

=== Fate ===
U-51 was sunk by a torpedo from the British submarine HMS Cachalot in the Bay of Biscay on 28 August 1940. Forty-three men died; there were no survivors.

=== Wolfpacks ===
U-51 took part in one wolfpack, namely:

- Prien (12 – 17 June 1940)

== Summary of raiding history ==
During her service, U-51 sank five merchant ships for a loss of 26,296 GRT and one auxiliary warship of 4,724 GRT.

Date	Ship	Nationality	Tonnage (Note: Merchant ship tonnages are in gross register tons. Military vessels are listed by tons displacement.)	Fate
22 January 1940	Gothia	Sweden	1,640	Sunk
29 January 1940	Eika	Norway	1,503	Sunk
25 June 1940	Saranac	United Kingdom	12,049	Sunk
25 June 1940	Windsorwood	United Kingdom	5,395	Sunk
29 June 1940	HMS Edgehill	Royal Navy	4,724	Sunk
15 August 1940	Sylviafield	United Kingdom	5,709	Sunk

== In fiction ==
The fourth U-boat in the film The Navy Comes Through has the number U-51.

== Bibliography ==
- Busch, Rainer; Röll, Hans-Joachim (1999). German U-boat commanders of World War II : a biographical dictionary. Translated by Brooks, Geoffrey. London, Annapolis, Md: Greenhill Books, Naval Institute Press. ISBN 1-55750-186-6.
- Busch, Rainer; Röll, Hans-Joachim (1999). Deutsche U-Boot-Verluste von September 1939 bis Mai 1945 [German U-boat losses from September 1939 to May 1945]. Der U-Boot-Krieg (in German). Vol. IV. Hamburg, Berlin, Bonn: Mittler. ISBN 3-8132-0514-2.
- Gröner, Erich; Jung, Dieter; Maass, Martin (1991). U-boats and Mine Warfare Vessels. German Warships 1815–1945. Vol. 2. Translated by Thomas, Keith; Magowan, Rachel. London: Conway Maritime Press. ISBN 0-85177-593-4.
