= HMS Cachalot (N83) =

Submarine of the Royal Navy

Coordinates: 32°49′N 20°11′E

- HMS Cachalot (N83)

History

United Kingdom
- Name: HMS Cachalot
- Builder: Scotts, Greenock
- Laid down: 12 May 1936
- Launched: 2 December 1937
- Commissioned: 15 August 1938
- Fate: Sunk 30 July 1941
- Badge

General characteristics
- Displacement: 1,810 tons surfaced; 2,157 tons submerged
- Length: 293 ft (89 m)
- Beam: 25 ft 6 in (7.77 m)
- Draught: 16 ft 10 in (5.13 m)
- Propulsion: 2 shaft, Diesel (3300 hp) plus electric (1630 hp)
- Speed: 15.5 knots surfaced; 8.75 knots submerged
- Complement: 59
- Armament: 6 × 21 inch (533 mm) torpedo tubes (bow); 12 torpedoes; 1 × 4 inch deck gun; 50 mines

HMS Cachalot (N83) was one of the six-ship class of Grampus-class mine-laying submarine of the Royal Navy. She was built at Scotts, Greenock and launched 2 December 1937. She served in World War II in home waters and the Mediterranean. She was rammed and sunk by the Italian torpedo boat Generale Achille Papa on 30 July 1941.

== Career ==
In August 1940, Cachalot torpedoed and sank the German submarine U-51 in the Bay of Biscay and in September the German auxiliary minesweeper M 1604 / Österreich hit a mine laid by Cachalot and sank.

She was assigned to operate in the Mediterranean in 1941.

== Sinking ==
Cachalot left Malta on 26 July, bound for Alexandria. At 2 o’clock on the morning of 30 July the Italian torpedo boat Generale Achille Papa was spotted causing her to dive. Upon resurfacing she was attacked by the Italian vessel. Cachalot attempted to dive again but the upper hatch jammed, and the Italian destroyer rammed her. The crew scuttled the ship as they abandoned her and all personnel except for a Maltese steward were picked up by the Italians.

== Bibliography ==
- Caruana, Joseph (2012). "Emergency Victualling of Malta During WWII". Warship International. LXIX (4): 357–364. ISSN 0043-0374.
- Colledge, J. J.; Warlow, Ben (2006) [1969]. Ships of the Royal Navy: The Complete Record of All Fighting Ships of the Royal Navy from the 15th Century to the Present (3rd Rev ed.). London: Chatham Publishing. ISBN 978-1-86176-281-8. OCLC 67375475.
