= HMS Havant (H32) =

British H-class destroyer

Coordinates: 51°08′00″N 2°15′49″E

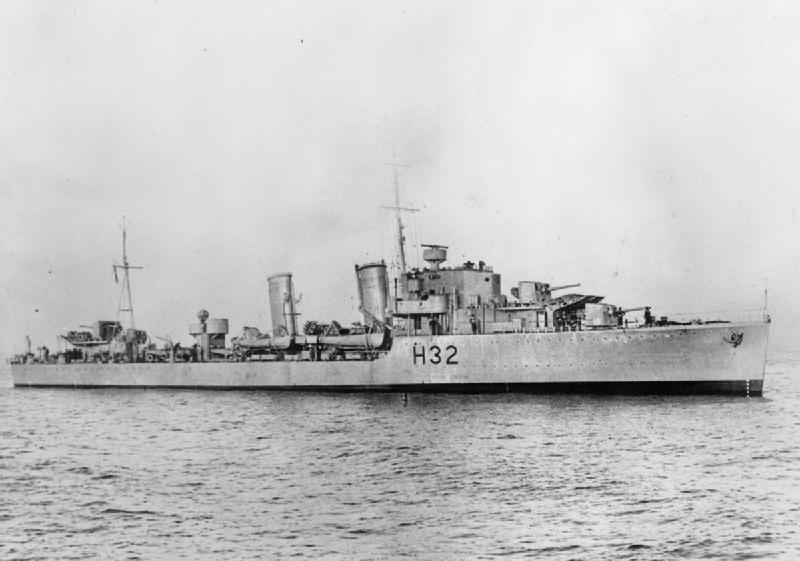
- HMS Havant

History

Brazil
- Name: Javary
- Ordered: 8 December 1937
- Builder: J. Samuel White, Cowes
- Laid down: 30 March 1938
- Launched: 17 July 1939
- Fate: Purchased by the United Kingdom, 5 September 1939

United Kingdom
- Name: HMS Havant
- Acquired: 5 September 1939
- Commissioned: 19 December 1939
- Identification: Pennant number H32
- Fate: Scuttled, 1 June 1940

General characteristics as built
- Class & type: Brazilian H-class destroyer
- Displacement: 1,350 long tons (1,370 t) (standard); 1,883 long tons (1,913 t) (deep load)
- Length: 323 ft (98.5 m)
- Beam: 33 ft (10.1 m)
- Draught: 12 ft 5 in (3.8 m)
- Installed power: 34,000 shp (25,000 kW)
- Propulsion: 2 shafts; Parsons geared steam turbines; 3 Admiralty water-tube boilers
- Speed: 36 knots (67 km/h; 41 mph)
- Range: 5,530 nmi (10,240 km; 6,360 mi) at 15 knots (28 km/h; 17 mph)
- Complement: 145
- Sensors & processing systems: ASDIC
- Armament: 3 × 1 – QF 4.7-inch (120 mm) Mk IX guns; 2 × 4 – .50 cal machine guns; 2 × 4 – 21 inch (533 mm) torpedo tubes; 110 × depth charges, 3 rails and 8 throwers

HMS Havant was an H-class destroyer originally ordered by the Brazilian Navy with the name Javary in the late 1930s, but was bought by the Royal Navy after the beginning of World War II in September 1939. The ship was initially assigned to escort duties in the Western Approaches, but was transferred to the Home Fleet when the Norwegian Campaign began in April 1940. She was only peripherally involved in the campaign as she escorted ships carrying troops that occupied Iceland and the Faeroe Islands as well as convoys to Narvik. Havant was evacuating troops from Dunkirk when she was badly damaged by Junkers Ju 87 Stuka dive bombers on 1 June and had to be scuttled.

== Description ==
Havant displaced 1,350 long tons (1,370 t) at standard load and 1,883 long tons (1,913 t) at deep load. The ship had an overall length of 323 feet (98.5 m), a beam of 33 feet (10.1 m) and a draught of 12 feet 5 inches (3.8 m). She was powered by Parsons geared steam turbines, driving two shafts, which developed a total of 34,000 shaft horsepower (25,000 kW) and gave a maximum speed of 36 knots (67 km/h; 41 mph). Steam for the turbines was provided by three Admiralty 3-drum water-tube boilers. Havant carried a maximum of 470 long tons (480 t) of fuel oil that gave her a range of 5,530 nautical miles (10,240 km; 6,360 mi) at 15 knots (28 km/h; 17 mph). The ship's complement was 145 officers and men.

The ship was designed for four 45-calibre 4.7-inch Mk IX guns in single mounts, designated 'A', 'B', 'X', and 'Y' from front to rear, but 'Y' gun was removed to compensate for the additional depth charges added. For anti-aircraft (AA) defence, Havant had two quadruple Mark I mounts for the 0.5 inch Vickers Mark III machine gun. She was fitted with two above-water quadruple torpedo tube mounts for 21-inch (533 mm) torpedoes. One depth charge rail and two throwers were originally fitted, but this was increased to 3 sets of rails and eight throwers while fitting-out. The ship's load of depth charges was increased from 20 to 110 as well.

== Service ==
Javary was ordered by Brazil on 8 December 1937 from J. Samuel White, Cowes. The ship was laid down on 30 March 1938 and launched on 17 July 1939. She was purchased by the British on 5 September and renamed HMS Havant. The ship was commissioned on 19 December and arrived at Portland Harbour on 8 January 1940 to begin working up. She made one unsuccessful anti-submarine sweep 4–9 February with the destroyers Ardent and Whitshed after she was assigned to the 9th Destroyer Flotilla of the Western Approaches Command at Plymouth. Havant had degaussing equipment fitted and minor repairs were made through March.

The ship was en route to Greenock to escort a convoy to Gibraltar on 7 April when she was transferred to the Home Fleet as a result of the impending German invasion of Norway. Along with her sister Hesperus, Havant escorted the heavy cruiser Suffolk on 13 April as the latter ship carried a detachment of Royal Marines to occupy the Faeroe Islands. The ship then escorted convoys to Narvik until 7 May. A week later she escorted the ocean liners Lancastria and Franconia as they carried troops to occupy Iceland.

Havant joined the Dunkirk evacuation on 29 May and rescued over 2,300 men by 1 June. That morning she had embarked 500 troops and then went alongside the destroyer Ivanhoe, which had been disabled by German dive bombers earlier that morning. The ship loaded all of the troops and wounded from Ivanhoe and sailed for Dover under heavy air attack. Shortly afterwards, Stukas hit Havant with two bombs in her engine room and another exploded beneath her hull. Eight crewmen were killed and 25 were wounded in the attack. At least 25 soldiers were also killed. She was severely damaged and had to be scuttled by the minesweeper HMS Saltash after an attempt to tow her failed.
