= HMS Saltash (J62) =

Minesweeper of the Royal Navy

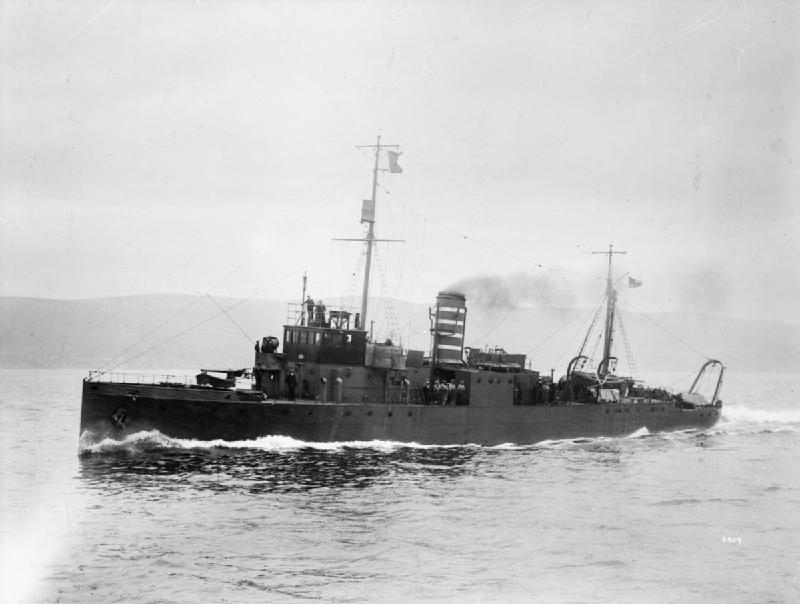
- Sister ship HMS Belvoir c. 1917–1918

History

United Kingdom
- Name: HMS Saltash (J62)
- Ordered: May 1917
- Builder: Murdoch and Murray
- Laid down: 5 September 1917
- Launched: 25 June 1918
- Decommissioned: January 1945
- Honours and awards: Dunkirk 1940; Normandy 1944
- Fate: Sold for Scrap, July 1947

General characteristics (1939)
- Class & type: Hunt-class minesweeper, Aberdare sub-class
- Displacement: 800 long tons (813 t)
- Length: 213 ft (65 m) o/a
- Beam: 28 ft 6 in (8.69 m)
- Draught: 7 ft 6 in (2.29 m)
- Installed power: 2 × Yarrow boilers; 2,200 ihp (1,600 kW)
- Propulsion: 2 shafts; 2 vertical triple-expansion steam engines
- Speed: 16 knots (30 km/h; 18 mph)
- Range: 1,500 nmi (2,800 km; 1,700 mi) at 15 knots (28 km/h; 17 mph)
- Complement: 74
- Armament: 1 × QF 4-inch (102 mm) gun; 1 × 76 mm (3.0 in) anti-aircraft gun

HMS Saltash (J62) was a Hunt-class minesweeper of the Aberdare sub-class built for the Royal Navy during World War I. She was not finished in time to participate in the First World War and survived the Second World War to be sold for scrap in 1947.

== Design and description ==
The Aberdare sub-class were enlarged versions of the original Hunt-class ships with a more powerful armament. The ships displaced 800 long tons (810 t) at normal load. They had a length between perpendiculars of 220 feet (67.1 m) and measured 231 feet (70.4 m) long overall. The Aberdares had a beam of 26 feet 6 inches (8.1 m) and a draught of 7 feet 6 inches (2.3 m). The ships' complement consisted of 74 officers and ratings.

The ships had two vertical triple-expansion steam engines, each driving one shaft, using steam provided by two Yarrow boilers. The engines produced a total of 2,200 indicated horsepower (1,600 kW) and gave a maximum speed of 16 knots (30 km/h; 18 mph). They carried a maximum of 185 long tons (188 t) of coal which gave them a range of 1,500 nautical miles (2,800 km; 1,700 mi) at 15 knots (28 km/h; 17 mph).

The Aberdare sub-class was armed with a quick-firing (QF) four-inch (102 mm) gun forward of the bridge and a QF twelve-pounder (76.2 mm) anti-aircraft gun aft. Some ships were fitted with six- or three-pounder guns in lieu of the twelve-pounder.

== Construction and career ==
Saltash, named after the town of Saltash in south-east Cornwall, was built by Murdoch and Murray of Port Glasgow, launched 25 June 1918 and served through the last few months of World War I as well as through all of World War II. She was involved in the evacuation of Dunkirk, during which, on 1 June 1940, she took on board the crew of HMS Havant, that ship having been heavily damaged by German aircraft after they had successfully evacuated some 3,000 troops themselves.

Saltash later returned to northern France as part of the Normandy landings in 1944. She was decommissioned on 13 March 1947.

A fictitious HMS Saltash appears in Nicholas Monsarrat's novel of the Royal Navy during World War II, The Cruel Sea.
