= Convoy HX 49 =

- Part of World War II
Date	21/22 June 1940
Location	Atlantic Ocean
Result	German tactical victory

Belligerents
(Nazi Germany) Germany	United Kingdom

Commanders and leaders
V.Adm. Karl Dönitz	V.Adm. L D Mackinnon

Strength
3 U-boats	50 merchant ships 2 escorts

Casualties and losses
no losses	3 ships sunk 1 ship sunk after dispersal

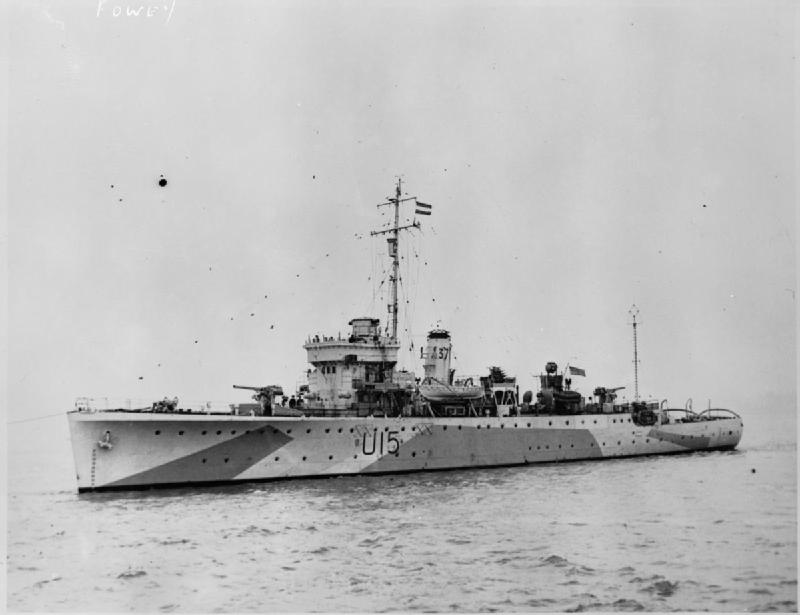
British sloop HMS Fowey.

Convoy HX 49 was a North Atlantic convoy of the HX series which ran during the Battle of the Atlantic in World War II. It was the 49th of the numbered series of merchant convoys run by the Allies from Halifax to Liverpool. The convoy was attacked by German U-boats, losing three of its 50 ships sunk. Another ship was lost after dispersal.

== Background ==
HX 49 was formed of two sections sailing from the Americas. The main body, of 26 ships, departed Halifax on 9 June 1940 with ships gathered from the US eastern seaboard; it was led by convoy commodore vice-admiral LD Mackinnon RN in the steamship Eurybates. It was accompanied by its ocean escort, the Armed Merchant Cruiser Ausonia, and a local escort of two RCN destroyers.

On 13 June the convoy was joined by BHX 49, 24 ships from the Caribbean and South America, that had gathered at Bermuda, departing there on 8 June escorted by the AMC Ragputana and a local escort.

Ranged against HX 49 were U-boats of the German Navy's U-boat Arm, on patrol in Britain's South West Approaches. The UBW had five U-boats in area when contact was made on 21 June 1940.

== Action ==
On 20 June HX 49's Western Approaches escort arrived; the sloops Sandwich, from escorting the outbound OB 169, and Fowey, from OA 169. During the crossing two ships had dropped out of convoy; both arrived safely. A third, Moordrecht, was detached for a port in neutral Spain: She was found by U-48 on 20 June and torpedoed, without examination.

The following evening U-47 found HX 49 about 50 miles south of Cape Clear Island. Her commander, rising star Gunther Prien, took her into the middle of the convoy and sank the tanker San Fernando. The U-boat then had to crash-dive to avoid being run down by a freighter, but the attack caused the convoy to scatter. Later that night two more ships were found and sunk; Randsfjord by U-30 and Eli Knudsen by U-32.

At daybreak on 22 June the two sloops began to gather the ships back together, and HX 49 continued without further loss. The main body arrived in Liverpool on 24 June.

== Ships lost ==
Merchant ships lost
Name	Flag	Tonnage (GRT)	Date sunk	Notes
Moordrecht	Netherlands	7,493	20 June	detached 18 June for landfall in Corunna. Torpedoed by U-48; 25 dead, 4 survivors
San Fernando	United Kingdom	13,056	21 June	torpedoed by U-47; 49 survivors, picked up by Fowey and Sandwich
Randsfjord	Norway	3,999	22 June	torpedoed by U-30; 4 dead, 29 survivors, picked up by Port Hobart
Eli Knudsen	Norway	9,026	22 June	torpedoed by U-32; 37 survivors, picked up by Sandwich

== Bibliography ==
- Blair, Clay (1996) Hitler's U-boat War Vol I Cassell ISBN 0-304-35260-8
- Arnold Hague (2000) The Allied Convoy System 1939–1945 ISBN 1-86176-147-3
