= French submarine Bévéziers (S621) =

French attack submarine

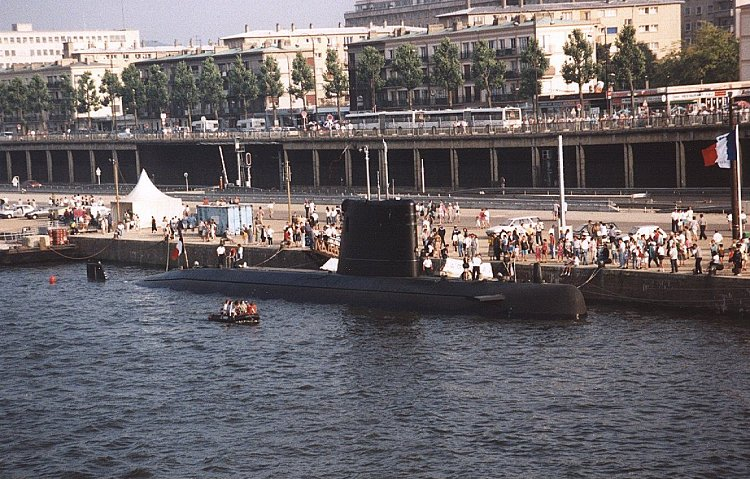
- Bévéziers' sister ship Agosta at Rouen, 1994

History

France
- Name: Bévéziers
- Builder: Cherbourg Naval Base
- Laid down: 17 May 1973
- Launched: 14 June 1975
- Commissioned: 29 September 1977
- Decommissioned: 1998
- Fate: Scrapped, 2020

General characteristics
- Class & type: Agosta-class submarine
- Displacement: Surfaced: 1,450 tons; Submerged: 1,725 tons
- Length: 67.6 m (221 ft 9 in)
- Beam: 6.8 m (22 ft 4 in)
- Draft: 5.5 m (18 ft 1 in)
- Installed power: Surfaced: 3,600 bhp (2,700 kW); Submerged: 4,600 shp (3,400 kW)
- Propulsion: 2 × SEMT-Pielstick diesel engines; Electric motors; 1 shaft
- Speed: Surfaced: 12 knots (22 km/h; 14 mph); Submerged: 20 knots (37 km/h; 23 mph)
- Complement: 54
- Armament: 4 × bow-mounted 550 mm (22 in) torpedo tubes; 16 × torpedoes

Bévéziers (S621/Q621) was an Agosta-class diesel-electric attack submarine operated by the French Navy between 1977 and 1998. Laid down in 1973, she operated in the Atlantic throughout the Cold War. After the submarine was decommissioned, she was laid up for a decade and scrapped in 2020.

== Development and design ==
In 1972, the French Navy proposed Plan Bleu to modernize the fleet and deemphasize ballistic missile submarines. The plan, among other elements, called for 20 fleet submarines by 1985. Consequently, the loss of many French colonies reduced emphasis on French ships operating in Asia and Africa. Compared to the previous Narval-class submarines designed in the 1950s, the Agosta class incorporated two decades of improved technology, a similar displacement, and a smaller size and range.

The four Agosta-class attack submarines measured 67.6 metres (221 ft 9 in) overall in length, with a beam of 6.8 metres (22 ft 4 in) and a draught of 5.5 metres (18 ft 1 in). The boats displaced 1,450 tons surfaced and 1,725 tons submerged and carried a complement of 54. Propulsion was provided through a single shaft powered by two SEMT-Pielstick diesel engines and electric motors, which produced 3,600 brake horsepower (2,700 kW) when surfaced and 4,600 shaft horsepower (3,400 kW) submerged. This machinery enabled a maximum speed of 12 knots (22 km/h; 14 mph) surfaced and 20 knots (37 km/h; 23 mph) submerged. Armament consisted of four bow-mounted 550 mm (22 in) torpedo tubes and 16 torpedoes carried onboard. Onboard sonars included the DUUA-2, DSUV-2, and DUUX-2.

== Service history ==
Bévéziers was second of the class to be built, and was laid down at the Cherbourg Naval Base on 17 May 1973, launched on 14 June 1975, and commissioned on 29 September 1977. By 1987, the class was retrofitted to launch SM 39 Exocet missiles out of the torpedo tubes. The four submarines formed the Atlantic Submarine Squadron (Escadrille des Sous-Marins de l'Atlantique) and Bévéziers operated out of Lorient for her career. The submarine was decommissioned in 1998, one year after the squadron was dissolved. Alongside her sister ship La Praya, the two submarines were stored inside the Nazi-era submarine pens in Brest between 2009 and 2020. The boats were stripped of their names, with Bévéziers redesignated Q621. In 2020, they were moved to a dry dock in the city to be broken up despite an earlier effort to preserve one of the boats as a museum ship. Efforts to dismantle the duo began in late 2020 and were complicated by the threat of asbestos and their small size, and was estimated to last 9 months.
