= Roland Morillot-class submarine =

Cancelled French submarines

Class overview
- Name: Roland Morillot class
- Operators: French Navy
- Planned: 13
- Completed: 0
- Canceled: 13

General characteristics
- Type: Submarine
- Displacement: Surfaced: 1,817 tons; Submerged: 2,416 tons
- Length: 102.50 m (336 ft 3 in)
- Beam: 8.32 m (27 ft 4 in)
- Draft: 4.50 m (14 ft 9 in)
- Installed power: Surfaced: 12,000 bhp (8,900 kW); Submerged: 2,300 shp (1,700 kW)
- Propulsion: Diesel engines; Electric motors; 2 shafts
- Speed: Surfaced: 22 knots (41 km/h; 25 mph); Submerged: 9 knots (17 km/h; 10 mph)
- Capacity: 95 tons fuel oil
- Complement: 70
- Armament: 10 × 550 mm (22 in) torpedo tubes; 2 × 400 mm (16 in) torpedo tubes; 1 × 90 mm (3.5 in)/40 gun; 2 × 2 13.2 mm (0.52 in) anti-aircraft machine guns

The Roland Morillot-class submarine was a series of 13 submarines planned to be operated by the French Navy to replace the Redoutable-class submarines. While the first boat was ordered in 1934 and three were laid down, none were complete by the Fall of France and the entire class was cancelled.

== Development and design ==
The French Navy envisioned the Roland Morillot-class submarines to replace the older Redoutable class, and the two classes featured a similar design. However, the new design included more powerful diesel engines that could have theoretically produced an additional 3 knots (5.6 km/h; 3.5 mph) at the expense of a shorter range. One boat was ordered in both 1934 and 1937 with three in 1938 and a further eight in 1940. The first three—named Roland Morillot, La Praya, and La Martinique—were laid down at the Cherbourg Naval Base, with the next two boats named La Guadeloupe and La Réunion. During the Fall of France, the partially built submarines were demolished on 18 June 1940 and the rest of the boats were cancelled.

The design featured an overall length of 102.50 metres (336 ft 3 in), with a beam of 8.32 metres (27 ft 4 in) and a draught of 4.50 metres (14 ft 9 in). The boats displaced 1,817 tons surfaced and 2,416 tons submerged and carried a complement of 70. Propulsion was provided by two shafts driven by diesel engines for surface running and electric motors for submerged operations, which could output 12,000 brake horsepower (8,900 kW) surfaced for 22 knots (41 km/h; 25 mph) and 2,300 shaft horsepower (1,700 kW) submerged to produce 9 knots (17 km/h; 10 mph). The submarines carried 95 tons of fuel oil for a range of 10,000 nautical miles (19,000 km; 12,000 mi) at a cruising speed of 10 knots (19 km/h; 12 mph). Armament consisted of ten 550-millimetre (22 in) torpedo tubes, two 400 mm (16 in) torpedo tubes, one 90 mm (3.5 in)/40 Modèle 1936 deck gun, and two twin-mounted 13.2 mm (0.52 in) anti-aircraft machine guns.
