= List of shipwrecks in September 1940 =

The list of shipwrecks in September 1940 includes ships sunk, foundered, grounded, or otherwise lost during September 1940.

== 1 September ==
List of shipwrecks: 1 September 1940
Ship	State	Description
Efploia	Greece	World War II: Convoy OB 205: The cargo ship (3,867 GRT) straggled behind the convoy. She was torpedoed and damaged in the Atlantic Ocean (55°27′N 13°17′W) by U-101 (Kriegsmarine). All 27 crew were rescued by HMS Anthony (Royal Navy), which scuttled the ship at 55°43′N 13°05′W.
HMS Ivanhoe	Royal Navy	World War II: Texel Disaster: The I-class destroyer struck a mine in the North Sea, off the Frisian Islands, Netherlands and was severely damaged. She was scuttled by HMS Kelvin (Royal Navy). Eight of her 146 crew were killed. Survivors were rescued by HMS MTB 14, HMS MTB 16, and HMS MTB 17 all (Royal Navy).
MAS 536	Regia Marina	World War II: The motor torpedo boat was rammed and sunk by HMS Ilex (Royal Navy) at either Maltezana, Rhodes or Stampala, Greece.
HMML Mesme	Royal Navy	The motor launch was in collision with HMS Sunfish (Royal Navy) at Grangemouth, Stirlingshire and sank with the loss of all three crew.
HMT Royalo	Royal Navy	World War II: The naval trawler (248 GRT) struck a mine and sank in Mount's Bay off Penzance, Cornwall with the loss of eleven crew.
Sancte Michel	France	World War II: The trawler(168 GRT) was sunk by a mine in the Bay of Biscay off Brest, Finistère by HMS Tigris (Royal Navy). Six of her 14 crew were killed.

== 2 September ==
List of shipwrecks: 2 September 1940
Ship	State	Description
Cymbeline	United Kingdom	World War II: The cargo ship was torpedoed and sunk in the Atlantic Ocean south west of the Cape Verde Islands (27°55′N 36°01′W) by Widder (Kriegsmarine) with the loss of seven of her 36 crew. Twenty-six of her survivors were made prisoners of war.
Legatus	Canada	The sailing ship ran aground in the Minas Basin, Nova Scotia and was wrecked.
Pionier	Kriegsmarine	World War II: The troopship was torpedoed and sunk in the North Sea north east of Skagen, Denmark (57°50′N 10°46′E) by HMS Sturgeon (Royal Navy) with the loss of 338 of the 823 people aboard.
Scalaria	Australia	The sailing ship sank in the Pacific Ocean off Wyndham, Western Australia.
Thornlea	United Kingdom	World War II: Convoy OB 206: The cargo ship was torpedoed and sunk in the Atlantic Ocean west of County Donegal, Ireland (55°14′N 16°40′W) by U-46 (Kriegsmarine) with the loss of three of her 37 crew. Survivors were rescued by HMCS Skeena (Royal Canadian Navy) and Hild (Norway).
UJ-121 Jochen	Kriegsmarine	World War II: The submarine chaser struck a mine and sank in the North Sea off Ostend, West Flanders, Belgium.
Ville de Mons	Belgium	World War II: The cargo ship was torpedoed and sunk in the Atlantic Ocean (58°20′N 12°00′W) by U-47 (Kriegsmarine). Her 54 crew were rescued.

== 3 September ==
List of shipwrecks: 3 September 1940
Ship	State	Description
Anna Sofie	Norway	World War II: The cargo ship was bombed and sunk at Haugesund by Royal Air Force aircraft. She was later raised, repaired and returned to service.
Coraline	Australia	The cargo ship ran aground at Point Kialla, New South Wales and was wrecked. One of her seven crew was killed.
Philotis	United Kingdom	The coaster collided with another vessel and sank off Milford Haven, Pembrokeshire.
Mars	Kriegsmarine	The decoy ship was sunk on this date.
Kurmark	Germany	World War II: The cargo ship, ex-Tropic Sea (Norway) that had been captured by Orion (Kriegsmarine) and renamed, was intercepted in the Bay of Biscay (46°30′N 11°30′W) by HMS Truant (Royal Navy) and was scuttled by her crew. British prisoners and Tropic Sea's captain and wife were rescued by HMS Truant. The next day a Short Sunderland aircraft of the Royal Air Force picked up 29 Norwegian prisoners. The German crew was picked up from her boats by a Spanish fishing vessel and taken to Spain.
U-57	Kriegsmarine	The Type IIC submarine collided with Rona (Norway) and sank in the North Sea off Brunsbüttel, Schleswig-Holstein with the loss of six of her 25 crew. She was subsequently raised, repaired and returned to service.
Ulva	United Kingdom	World War II: The cargo ship was torpedoed and sunk in the Atlantic Ocean north west of County Donegal, Ireland (55°45′N 11°45′W) by U-60 (Kriegsmarine) with the loss of three of her 20 crew.

== 4 September ==
List of shipwrecks: 4 September 1940
Ship	State	Description
Corbrook	United Kingdom	World War II: Convoy FS 271: The collier was torpedoed and sunk in the North Sea off Happisburgh, Norfolk by S 21 (Kriegsmarine). Her crew were rescued.
Fulham V	United Kingdom	World War II: Convoy FS 271: The cargo ship was torpedoed and sunk in the North Sea off Winterton-on-Sea, Norfolk by S 22 (Kriegsmarine).
Joseph Swan	United Kingdom	World War II: Convoy FS 271: The collier was torpedoed and sunk in the North Sea north east of Winterton-on-Sea by S 18 (Kriegsmarine) with the loss of seventeen of her eighteen crew.
Lairdscastle	United Kingdom	The passenger ship (1,945t) collided with Vernon City (United Kingdom) and sank off the Mull of Kintyre, Argyllshire. All 101 people on board were rescued.
Luimneach	Ireland	World War II: The cargo ship was shelled and sunk in the Atlantic Ocean west south west of the Isles of Scilly, United Kingdom (47°50′N 9°12′W) by U-46 (Kriegsmarine). All eight crew were rescued; three were taken on board U-46 as prisoners of war, the rest were rescued by a French fishing trawler.
MAS 537	Regia Marina	World War II: The MAS 526-class MAS boat (20 GRT) was sunk in the Aegean Sea off Rhodes by HMAS Sydney (Royal Australian Navy), HMS Orion, HMS Ilex and HMS Decoy (all Royal Navy). All 13 crew were killed.
New Lambton	United Kingdom	World War II: Convoy FS 271: The cargo ship was torpedoed and sunk in the North Sea off Happisburgh by S 21 (Kriegsmarine). Her crew were rescued.
Nieuwland	Netherlands	World War II: Convoy FS 271: The collier as torpedoed and sunk in the North Sea off Winterton-on-Sea by S 18 (Kriegsmarine) with the loss of eight of her crew.
Olympic II	United States	The fishing barge was sunk in 100 feet (30 m) of water when rammed in fog by Sakito Maru (Japan) while anchored over the Horseshoe Kelp Bed off the entrance to the harbor of Los Angeles, California. Approximately eight fishermen were killed, and about seventeen were rescued. The wreck was later blown up as a hazard to navigation.
HMS Saucy	Royal Navy	World War II: The naval tug struck a mine in the Firth of Forth off Inchkeith, Fife and sank with the loss of all 26 crew.
Titan	United Kingdom	World War II: Convoy OA 207: The cargo ship was torpedoed and sunk in the Atlantic Ocean 80 nautical miles (150 km) south west of Rockall, Inverness-shire (58°14′N 15°50′W) by U-47 (Kriegsmarine) with the loss of six of her 95 crew. Survivors were rescued by HMCS St. Laurent (Royal Canadian Navy).

== 5 September ==
List of shipwrecks: 5 September 1940
Ship	State	Description
V 201 Gebrüder Kähler	Kriegsmarine	World War II: The vorpostenboot struck a mine and sank in the North Sea off Dunkerque, Nord, France.
V 403 Deutschland	Kriegsmarine	World War II: The vorpostenboot struck a mine and sank in the Westerschelde off Vlissingen, Zeeland, Netherlands.

== 6 September ==
List of shipwrecks: 6 September 1940
Ship	State	Description
Atlas	Greece	World War II: Convoy BN 4: The tanker straggled behind the convoy. She was torpedoed and sunk in the Red Sea 14 nautical miles (26 km) north of Jabal al-Tair Island (15°10′N 41°50′E) by Guglielmotti (Regia Marina). Her crew were rescued.
HMS Godetia	Royal Navy	World War II: Convoy OA 207: The Flower-class corvette collided with Marsa (United Kingdom) and sank in the Irish Sea off Altacarry Head, County Antrim (55°18′N 5°57′W) with the loss of 32 of her 47 crew.
O. C.	Norway	World War II: The coaster struck a mine and sank off the Terningen Lighthouse with the loss of five of her seven crew.
St. Glen	United Kingdom	World War II: Convoy SL 44A: The cargo ship was bombed and sunk in the North Sea south east of Peterhead, Aberdeenshire (57°25′N 1°45′W) by Luftwaffe aircraft with the loss of three of her 43 crew. Survivors were rescued by HMS Sandwich (Royal Navy).

== 7 September ==
List of shipwrecks: 7 September 1940
Ship	State	Description
Abbekerk	Netherlands	World War II: The cargo ship was bombed and sunk at London, United Kingdom during a Luftwaffe air raid. She was later raised, repaired and returned to service.
HMT Abronia	Royal Navy	The naval trawler foundered in the River Thames with the loss of five of her crew.
Gro	Norway	World War II: Convoy SC 2: The cargo ship was torpedoed and sunk in the Atlantic Ocean west of the Outer Hebrides, United Kingdom (58°30′N 16°10′W) by U-47 (Kriegsmarine) with the loss of eleven of her 32 crew. Burdwan (United Kingdom) rescued the survivors.
Beckton	United Kingdom	World War II: The tug (45 GRT) was bombed and sunk at Beckton Gas Works, London in a Luftwaffe air raid.
HMS Inanda	Royal Navy	World War II: The ocean boarding vessel was bombed and sunk in the Royal Albert Dock, London during a Luftwaffe air raid. She was later salvaged, rebuilt as a cargo ship and entered service as Empire Explorer.
HMS Inkosi	Royal Navy	World War II: The ocean boarding vessel was bombed and sunk in the Royal Albert Dock during a Luftwaffe air raid. She was later salvaged, rebuilt as a cargo ship and entered service as Empire Chivalry.
José de Larrinaga	United Kingdom	World War II: Convoy SC 2: The cargo ship was torpedoed and sunk in the Atlantic Ocean west of the Outer Hebrides (58°30′N 16°10′W) by U-47 (Kriegsmarine) with the loss of all 47 crew.
Neptunian	United Kingdom	World War II: Convoy SC 2: The cargo ship was torpedoed and sunk in the Atlantic Ocean west of the Outer Hebrides (58°27′N 17°17′W) by U-47 (Kriegsmarine) with the loss of all 36 crew.
Niendorf	Kriegsmarine	World War II: The patrol vessel struck a mine and sank in the English Channel off Calais, France.
HMY Rhodora	Royal Navy	The armed yacht collided with Ngatira (United Kingdom) and sank in the Bristol Channel off Cardiff, Glamorgan.
Salacon	United Kingdom	World War II: The fishing trawler (211 GRT, 1905) struck a mine and sank in the North Sea 5.3 nautical miles (9.8 km) south east of Spurn Point, Yorkshire with the loss of eight of her twelve crew.
Stad Alkmaar	Netherlands	World War II: Convoy FS 273: The cargo ship was torpedoed and sunk in the North Sea east of Lowestoft, Suffolk, United Kingdom (52°25′N 2°02′E) by the E-boats S-33 and S-36 (both Kriegsmarine). All fourteen crew were rescued.

== 8 September ==
List of shipwrecks: 8 September 1940
Ship	State	Description
Antonios Chandris	Greece	World War II: The cargo ship was captured and scuttled in the South Atlantic (11°25′N 34°10′W) by Widder (Kriegsmarine). 32 of her crew survived.
Emma	United States	The fishing vessel (7 GRT) was destroyed by fire in Tiedeman Slough (60°25′N 145°28′W) on the south-central coast of the Territory of Alaska. The only person aboard survived.

== 9 September ==
List of shipwrecks: 9 September 1940
Ship	State	Description
Alfred Colebrook	United Kingdom	World War II The drifter was sunk as a blockship at Richborough, Kent.
Anna	Belgium	World War II: The cargo ship was bombed, set afire and sunk in Russia Dock, Surrey Docks, London, United Kingdom during a Luftwaffe air raid.
Athelking	United Kingdom	World War II: The tanker was shelled and sunk in the Indian Ocean (21°52′S 67°20′E) by Atlantis (Kriegsmarine) with the loss of four of her 40 crew. Survivors were made prisoners of war.
Baronesa	United Kingdom	World War II: The cargo ship was bombed and sunk by Luftwaffe aircraft in the Port of London, after sustaining damage a few days earlier an attack by German E-boats in the North Sea as part of convoy FS 271.
HMT Dervish	Royal Navy	World War II: The naval trawler struck a mine and sank off the mouth of the Humber with the loss of four of her fifteen crew.
Harvest Moon	United Kingdom	World War II: The fishing trawler was sunk as a blockship at Richborough.
John Baptish	United Kingdom	World War II: The fishing trawler struck a mine and sank south of the Conningbeg Lightship ( Trinity House) with the loss of thirteen of her crew.
Mardinian	United Kingdom	World War II: Convoy SC 2: The cargo ship was torpedoed and sunk in the Atlantic Ocean south west of Barra, Outer Hebrides (56°37′N 9°00′W) by U-28 (Kriegsmarine) with the loss of six of her 38 crew. Survivors were rescued by HMT St. Apollo and HMS Aurania (both Royal Navy).
Minnie de Larrinaga	United Kingdom	World War II: The cargo ship was bombed, set on fire and sunk whilst docked at London. She was declared a constructive total loss and subsequently sunk as a blockship at Dover, Kent on 5 February 1941.
Possidon	Greece	World War II: Convoy SC 2: The cargo ship was torpedoed and sunk in the Atlantic Ocean north west of County Donegal, Ireland (56°43′N 9°16′W) by U-47 (Kriegsmarine) with the loss of her seventeen crew. Survivors were rescued by HMS Arrow (Royal Navy).
RFA War Sepoy	Royal Fleet Auxiliary	World War II: The tanker was scuttled as a blockship at Dover. The wreck was dispersed by explosives in 1964.

== 10 September ==
List of shipwrecks: 10 September 1940
Ship	State	Description
Benarty	United Kingdom	World War II: The cargo ship was shelled and sunk in the South Atlantic (18°32′S 70°07′E) by Atlantis (Kriegsmarine). Her 49 crew survived.
Eli	Norway	World War II: The cargo ship was bombed and sunk in the Atlantic Ocean 12 nautical miles (22 km) off the Skerryvore Lighthouse, Argyllshire, United Kingdom by Luftwaffe aircraft with the loss of two of her 30 crew. Survivors were rescued by a Royal Navy trawler.

== 11 September ==
List of shipwrecks: 11 September 1940
Ship	State	Description
Albionic	United Kingdom	World War II: The cargo ship was torpedoed and sunk in the Atlantic Ocean south south east of Rockall, Inverness-shire by U-99 (Kriegsmarine) with the loss of all 25 crew.
HMT Beathwood	Royal Navy	World War II: The naval trawler struck a mine and sank in the North Sea off Montrose, Angus.
Escaut	Kriegsmarine	The tug sank off the French coast.
H 42 Cordoba	Kriegsmarine	World War II: The cargo ship struck a mine in the English Channel off Le Havre, Seine-Inférieure, France, and was beached. She was subsequently taken in to Le Havre and laid up. She was scuttled in September 1944.
Harpenden	United Kingdom	World War II: Convoy OA 210: The cargo ship was torpedoed and damaged in the Atlantic Ocean by U-28 (Kriegsmarine) with the loss of a crew member. She was declared a constructive total loss but was repaired and returned to service in 1941 as Empire Stour.
Maas	Netherlands	World War II: Convoy OA 210: The cargo ship was torpedoed and sunk in the Atlantic Ocean west of Ireland (55°34′N 15°56′W) by U-28 (Kriegsmarine) with the loss of twenty of her 22 crew.
Respondo	United Kingdom	World War II: The fishing trawler departed from Milford Haven for the fishing grounds with a crew of eleven men and was never seen again, being lost with all hands. She might have been sunk by German aircraft in the next few days.
Umtali	United Kingdom	World War II: The cargo ship was bombed and damaged in the London Docks by Luftwaffe aircraft.

== 12 September ==
List of shipwrecks: 12 September 1940
Ship	State	Description
Benavon	United Kingdom	World War II: The cargo ship was shelled and sunk in the Indian Ocean south east of Madagascar (25°20′S 52°17′E) by Pinguin (Kriegsmarine) with the loss of 24 of her 49 crew. Survivors were taken as prisoners of war.
Gothic	United Kingdom	World War II: The tanker (2,444 GRT) struck a mine in the Humber Estuary and sank south east of Spurn Head, Yorkshire with the loss of 11 crew and one gunner. There were twelve survivors.
HMS Salvage King	Royal Navy	The tug ran aground off Duncansby Head, Caithness. She was declared a total loss.

== 13 September ==
List of shipwrecks: 13 September 1940
Ship	State	Description
Cassidaigne	Vichy France	World War II: The cargo ship struck a mine and sank in the Mediterranean Sea west of San Pietro Island. Sardinia, Italy.
Ginette Le Borgne	Vichy France	World War II: The cargo ship struck a mine and sank in the Mediterranean Sea west of Sardinia.
M-1306 Hermann Krone	Kriegsmarine	World War II: The auxiliary minesweeper struck a mine and sank in the Skaggerak off Hanstholm, Denmark.
Protesilaus	United Kingdom	World War II: The blockship was under tow from ST Empire Henchman (United Kingdom) and HMS Abeille XXI (Royal Navy) when the tow parted. The ship was declared a derelict and was scuttled 7 nautical miles (13 km) south west of Skerryvore, Argyllshire by HMT King Sol (Royal Navy).
T-104	Soviet Navy	World War II: The minesweeper struck a mine and sank in the Gulf of Finland.
UJ-173 Hinrich Wesselhöft	Kriegsmarine	The naval trawler / submarine chaser ran aground in Hardangerfjord, Norway. She was taken in tow but sank the next day.

== 14 September ==
List of shipwrecks: 14 September 1940
Ship	State	Description
Bøfjord	Kriegsmarine	The naval trawler caught fire, exploded and sank at Kristiansund, Norway with the loss of four of her ten crew.
Flandre	France	World War II: The ocean liner struck a mine, broke in two and sank in the Bay of Biscay south of La Rochelle, Charente-Inférieure.
Saint Agnes	United Kingdom	World War II: The cargo ship was torpedoed, shelled and sunk in the Atlantic Ocean west of Portugal (41°27′N 51°50′W) by Emo (Regia Marina). Her 64 crew were rescued.

== 15 September ==
List of shipwrecks: 15 September 1940
Ship	State	Description
A 30 Rolandseck	Kriegsmarine	World War II: The transport ship was sunk in an Allied air raid on Antwerp, Belgium. She was refloated, repaired and returned to service.
Alexandros	Greece	World War II: Convoy SC 3: The cargo ship straggled behind the convoy. She was torpedoed and sunk in the Atlantic Ocean west of the Hebrides, United Kingdom (56°50′N 15°04′W) by U-48 (Kriegsmarine) with the loss of five of her 30 crew. Of the survivors, 23 were rescued by HMCS St. Laurent (Royal Canadian Navy).
HMS Dundee	Royal Navy	World War II: Convoy SC 3: The Shoreham-class sloop was torpedoed and sunk in the Atlantic Ocean west of Ireland (56°45′N 14°14′W by U-48 (Kriegsmarine) with the loss of twelve of her crew. Survivors were rescued by Fido, Hild, Vigsnes (all Norway) and HMS Wanderer (Royal Navy)
Empire Volunteer	United Kingdom	World War II: Convoy SC 3: The cargo ship was torpedoed and sunk in the Atlantic Ocean west of Ireland (56°43′N 15°17′W) by U-48 (Kriegsmarine) with the loss of six of her 39 crew. Survivors were rescued by Fido and Granli (both Norway).
Halland	United Kingdom	World War II: The cargo ship was bombed and sunk in the North Sea 8 nautical miles (15 km) east of Dunbar. East Lothian, United Kingdom with the loss of seventeen of her crew.
Hird	Norway	World War II: Convoy HX 70 The cargo ship straggled behind the convoy due to a cargo fire on 10 September. She was torpedoed and sunk in the Atlantic Ocean 90 nautical miles (170 km) west of Rockall, Inverness-shire, United Kingdom (58°00′N 12°20′W) by U-65 (Kriegsmarine). All 30 crew were rescued by the fishing trawler Thorolfur ( Iceland).
Kenordoc	Canada	World War II: Convoy SC 3: The cargo ship straggled behind the convoy. She was shelled and sunk 44 nautical miles (81 km) west of Rockall by U-99 (Kriegsmarine) with the loss of seven of her twenty crew. Survivors were rescued by HMS Amazon (Royal Navy) and HMCS St. Laurent (Royal Canadian Navy).
Nailsea River	United Kingdom	World War II: The cargo liner was bombed and sunk in the North Sea 4 nautical miles (7.4 km) off Montrose, Angus (56°41′N 2°05′W) by Luftwaffe aircraft.

== 16 September ==
List of shipwrecks: 16 September 1940
Ship	State	Description
Aska	United Kingdom	World War II: The troopship was bombed and set afire in the Irish Sea off Rathlin Island, County Antrim (55°15′N 5°55′W) by Luftwaffe aircraft with the loss of 30 of the 644 people on board. Survivors were rescued by HMS Jason (Royal Navy). Aska came ashore on Cara Island, Argyllshire. She was declared a constructive total loss.
Bibury	United Kingdom	World War II: The cargo ship was shelled and sunk in the Atlantic Ocean south of the Cape Verde Islands by a German auxiliary cruiser with the loss of all 39 crew.
City of Mobile	United Kingdom	World War II: The cargo ship was bombed and sunk in the Irish Sea off Portaferry, County Down (54°18′30″N 5°16′30″W) by Luftwaffe aircraft. Her 76 crew were rescued.
Incemore	United Kingdom	The cargo ship ran aground at Heath Point, Anticosti Island, Quebec, Canada and was wrecked.
Lotos	Norway	World War II: Convoy SC 3: The cargo ship straggled behind the convoy. She was torpedoed and sunk in the Atlantic Ocean 15 nautical miles (28 km) north east Rockall, Inverness-shire, United Kingdom. Her seventeen crew survived.
Poitiers	Vichy France	World War II: The supply ship was intercepted and sunk in the Atlantic Ocean south of Dakar, French West Africa by HMS Cumberland (Royal Navy). Her crew were rescued. Poitiers was on a voyage from Dakar, Senegal to Tabou, Ivory Coast.
Stad Schiedam	Netherlands	World War II: The cargo ship suffered an internal explosion and sank in the Caribbean Sea. Explosion probably caused by a bomb placed on board. Twelve crew survived.

== 17 September ==
List of shipwrecks: 17 September 1940
Ship	State	Description
Aquilone	Regia Marina	World War II: The Turbine-class destroyer hit two mines laid just outside the Benghazi harbor, Libya by Fairey Swordfish aircraft from 819 Squadron, Fleet Air Arm, based on HMS Illustrious (Royal Navy), and sank.
Borea	Regia Marina	World War II: The Turbine-class destroyer was torpedoed and sunk in Benghazi harbor by Fairey Swordfish aircraft of 815 Squadron, Fleet Air Arm, based on HMS Illustrious (Royal Navy).
Cabo Tortosa	Spain	World War II: The cargo ship was torpedoed and sunk in the Atlantic Ocean off Porto, Portugal by Alpino Bagnolini (Regia Marina). Her crew were rescued by Monte Ayala (Spain).
Crown Arun	United Kingdom	World War II: Convoy HX 71: The cargo ship straggled behind the convoy. She was torpedoed, shelled and sunk in the Atlantic Ocean off Rockall, Inverness-shire (58°02′N 14°18′W) by U-99 (Kriegsmarine). Her 25 crew were rescued by HMS Winchelsea (Royal Navy).
Gloriastella	Italy	World War II: The cargo ship was bombed and sunk at Benghazi by Fairey Swordfish aircraft of 815 Squadron, Fleet Air Arm based on HMS Illustrious (Royal Navy).
Hild	Norway	The cargo ship ran aground in a gale at Petite-Vallée, Quebec, Canada. She was on a voyage from Liverpool, Lancashire, United Kingdom to Petite-Valée. She was declared a total loss.
Kalliopi S.	Greece	World War II: The cargo ship was bombed and damaged in the Atlantic Ocean 10 nautical miles (19 km) north east of Tory Island, County Donegal, Ireland, by aircraft of I Staffeln, Kampfgeschwader 40, Luftwaffe and was abandoned. Her crew survived. The wreck came ashore at Sheephaven Bay and broke in two. She was declared a total loss.
LAZ-47	Kriegsmarine	The M-class minesweeper struck the wreck of the blockship Jan Pieterszoon Coen (Netherlands) off IJmuiden, North Holland, Netherlands and sank. She was raised, repaired and returned to service.
Maria Eugenia	Italy	World War II: The cargo ship was bombed and sunk at Benghazi by Fairey Swordfish aircraft of 815 Squadron, Fleet Air Arm based on HMS Illustrious (Royal Navy). The wreck was subsequently refloated and scrapped.
HMS Sussex	Royal Navy	World War II: The County-class cruiser was bombed and sunk at Glasgow, Renfrewshire with the loss of three of her crew. She was subsequently refloated, repaired and returned to service.
Tregenna	United Kingdom	World War II: Convoy HX 71: The cargo ship was torpedoed and sunk in the Atlantic Ocean west of the Outer Hebrides (58°22′N 15°42′W) by U-65 (Kriegsmarine) with the loss of 33 of her 37 crew.
V 304 Breslau	Kriegsmarine	The vorpostenbootwas wrecked at the entrance to the Noordzeekanaal near IJmuiden with the loss of four of her crew.
City of Benares	United Kingdom	World War II: Convoy OB 213: The passenger ship was torpedoed and sunk in the Atlantic Ocean (56°48′N 21°15′W) by U-48 (Kriegsmarine) with the loss of 134 passengers and 121 crewmen of the 406 people on board. Survivors were rescued by HMS Anthony and HMS Hurricane (both Royal Navy).

== 18 September ==
List of shipwrecks: 18 September 1940
Ship	State	Description
Admiral Day	United Kingdom	The cargo ship was driven ashore and wrecked on Canton Island, Gilbert and Ellice Islands.
Dunkerquois	Germany	World War II: The cargo ship was bombed in the English Channel. She sprang a leak and was beached at Le Havre, Seine-Inférieure, France. She was bombed and sunk by British aircraft in December. Refloated in March 1944 and scrapped in 1945.
Johann Blumenthal	Germany	World War II: The cargo ship was bombed and sunk in the English Channel off Cherbourg, Manche, France by Bristol Blenheim aircraft of the Royal Air Force. Survivors were rescued by Lody (Kriegsmarine). The wreck was subsequently dispersed by explosioves.
Magdalena	United Kingdom	World War II: Convoy SC 3: The cargo ship straggled behind the convoy. She was torpedoed and sunk in the Atlantic Ocean south of Iceland (57°20′N 20°16′W) by U-48 (Kriegsmarine) with the loss of all 31 crew.
Marina	United Kingdom	World War II: Convoy OB 213: The cargo ship was torpedoed and sunk in the Atlantic Ocean (56°46′N 21°15′W) by U-48 (Kriegsmarine) with the loss of two of her 39 crew. Survivors were rescued by Carlingford (United Kingdom) and HMS Hurricane (Royal Navy).
Minas Prince	United Kingdom	The schooner foundered off Halifax, Nova Scotia, Canada (43°14′N 67°35′W).

== 19 September ==
List of shipwrecks: 19 September 1940
Ship	State	Description
Almirante Jose De Carranza	Spain	World War II: The fishing trawler was torpedoed and sunk in the Atlantic Ocean 16 nautical miles (30 km) off Cape Villano by Guglielmo Marconi (Regia Marina) with the loss of all but one of her crew.
Shelbrit 1	United Kingdom	World War II: The coastal tanker struck a mine, caught fire and sank in the Moray Firth (57°39′N 3°56′W) with the loss of all hands; 20 crew and a gunner.
T3	Kriegsmarine	World War II: The Type 35 torpedo boat was bombed and sunk at Le Havre, Seine-Inférieure, France by Royal Air Force aircraft with the loss of nine of her 21 crew. She was later salvaged, repaired and returned to service.

== 20 September ==
List of shipwrecks: 20 September 1940
Ship	State	Description
Boka	Panama	World War II: Convoy OB 216: The cargo ship was torpedoed and sunk in the Atlantic Ocean 52 nautical miles (96 km) north of Rathlin Island, County Antrim (55°54′N 7°24′W) by U-138 (Kriegsmarine) with the loss of eight of her 34 crew. Survivors were rescued by HMS Arabis (Royal Navy).
City of Simla	United Kingdom	World War II: Convoy OB 216: The passenger ship was torpedoed and sunk in the Atlantic Ocean north of County Donegal, Ireland (55°55′N 8°20′W) by U-138 (Kriegsmarine) with the loss of three of the 350 people on board. Survivors were rescued by Guinean (United Kingdom) and the fishing trawler Van Dyke (Belgium).
Commissaire Ramel	United Kingdom	World War II: The passenger ship was shelled and sunk in the Indian Ocean (28°25′S 74°27′E) by Atlantis (Kriegsmarine) with the loss of three of her 66 crew.
Innisdhu	United Kingdom	World War II: The drifter struck a mine and sank in the Thames Estuary with the loss of all four crew.
Java	Italy	The hulk was sunk at Genoa in a training exercise for frogmen.
New Sevilla	United Kingdom	World War II: The whale factory ship was torpedoed and damaged in the Atlantic Ocean west of Islay, Outer Hebrides (55°48′N 7°22′W) by U-138 (Kriegsmarine) with the loss of two of her 284 crew. Survivors were rescued by HMS Arabis (Royal Navy), the fishing trawler Belgaum ( Iceland) and Industria (Sweden). New Sevila was taken in tow by Superman (United Kingdom) but sank the next day 9 nautical miles (17 km) off the Mull of Kintyre, Argyllshire (55°48′N 7°22′W).
Trito	Netherlands	World War II: The cargo ship was bombed and sunk in the English Channel south west of the Isle of Portland, Dorset, United Kingdom by Luftwaffe aircraft. Only three of her crew survived.

== 21 September ==
List of shipwrecks: 21 September 1940
Ship	State	Description
Baron Blythswood	United Kingdom	World War II: Convoy HX 72: The cargo ship (3,668 GRT) was torpedoed and sunk in the Atlantic Ocean west of Ireland by U-99 (Kriegsmarine) with the loss of all 35 crew.
Blairangus	United Kingdom	World War II: Convoy HX 72: The cargo ship (4,409 GRT) was torpedoed and sunk in the Atlantic Ocean south of Iceland (55°18′N 22°21′W) by U-48 (Kriegsmarine) with the loss of seven of her 34 crew. Survivors were rescued by Pikepool (United Kingdom).
Canonesa	United Kingdom	World War II: Convoy HX 72: The cargo ship (8,286 GRT) was torpedoed and sunk in the Atlantic Ocean (54°55′N 18°25′W) by U-100 (Kriegsmarine) with the loss of one of her 62 crew, the 4th Engineer Tom Purnell. Survivors were rescued by HMS La Malouine (Royal Navy).
Dalcairn	United Kingdom	World War II: Convoy HX 72: The cargo ship (4,608 GRT), on a voyage from Montreal, Quebec, Canada to Hull, Yorkshire, was torpedoed and sunk west of Ireland (55°00′N 19°00′W) by U-100 (Kriegsmarine). All 48 crew were rescued by HMS La Malouine (Royal Navy).
Elmbank	United Kingdom	World War II: Convoy HX 72: The cargo ship (5,156 GRT) was torpedoed, shelled and sunk in the Atlantic Ocean (55°20′N 22°30′W) by U-47 and U-99 (both Kriegsmarine) with the loss of two of her 56 crew. Survivors were rescued by Pikepool (United Kingdom).
Empire Adventure	United Kingdom	World War II: Convoy OB 216: The cargo ship was torpedoed and damaged off Rathlin Island, County Antrim (55°11′N 11°30′W) by U-138 (Kriegsmarine) with the loss of 21 of her 39 crew. Survivors were rescued by HMS Arabis (Royal Navy) and Industria (Sweden). Empire Adventure was taken under tow by Superman (Royal Navy) but sank on 23 September at 55°48′N 7°22′W.
Empire Airman	United Kingdom	World War II: Convoy HX 72: The cargo ship was torpedoed and damaged in the Atlantic Ocean (54°00′N 18°00′W) by U-100 (Kriegsmarine). She sank on 23 September (55°11′N 15°07′W) while under tow with the loss of 33 of her 37 crew. Survivors were rescued by HMS La Malouine (Royal Navy).
Imogene	Canada	The sailing ship ran aground on the east coast of Nova Scotia and was wrecked.
Invershannon	United Kingdom	World War II: Convoy HX 72: The tanker was torpedoed and sunk in the Atlantic Ocean 480 nautical miles (890 km) west of Bloody Foreland, County Donegal, Ireland (55°40′N 22°04′W) by U-99 (Kriegsmarine) with the loss of sixteen of her 33 crew. Survivors were rescued by HMT Fandango and HMS Shikari (both Royal Navy).
Torinia	United Kingdom	World War II: Convoy HX 72: The tanker was torpedoed and sunk in the Atlantic Ocean west of Ireland (54°55′N 18°17′W) by U-100 (Kriegsmarine) with the loss of five of her 62 crew. Survivors were rescued by HMS Skate (Royal Navy).

== 22 September ==
List of shipwrecks: 22 September 1940
Ship	State	Description
Apex No. 18	United States	The scow was destroyed by fire in Seal Cove (55°11′N 131°43′W) on the coast of Dall Island in the Alexander Archipelago, Territory of Alaska. The only person aboard survived.
Frederick S. Fales	United Kingdom	World War II: Convoy HX 72: The tanker was torpedoed and sunk in the Atlantic Ocean west of County Donegal, Ireland (55°30′N 13°40′W) by U-100 (Kriegsmarine) with the loss of two of her 48 crew. Survivors were rescued by HMS La Malouine (Royal Navy).
M-1604 Österreich	Kriegsmarine	World War II: The auxiliary minesweeper either struck two mines and sank off Penmarc'h, Finistère, France, or was shelled and sunk in the North Sea 40 nautical miles (74 km) west of Hook of Holland, South Holland, Netherlands.
Palestro	Regia Marina	World War II: The Palestro-class torpedo boat was torpedoed and sunk in the Adriatic Sea west of Durazzo, Albania by HMS Osiris (Royal Navy). Seventy-two of her crew were killed. There were 53 survivors.
Provvidenza	Italy	World War II: The cargo ship was torpedoed and sunk in the Tyrrhenian Sea off Ischia by HMS Truant (Royal Navy).
Scholar	United Kingdom	World War II: Convoy HX 72: The cargo ship was torpedoed and damaged in the Atlantic Ocean west of the Outer Hebrides (55°11′N 17°55′W) by U-100 (Kriegsmarine). She was taken in tow by Marauder (United Kingdom) but sank at 54°38′N 16°40′W). Her 45 crew were rescued by HMS Scimitar and HMS Skate (both Royal Navy.
Simla	Norway	World War II: Convoy HX 72: The cargo ship was torpedoed and sunk in the Atlantic Ocean west of Ireland (55°11′N 17°58′W) by U-100 (Kriegsmarine) with the loss of five of her 31 crew. Survivors were rescued by HMS Heartsease (Royal Navy)
Sperrbrecher 2 Athen	Kriegsmarine	World War II: The Sperrbrecher was severely damaged by an aerial mine at Boulogne, Pas-de-Calais, France and was beached. She was later salvaged and put into service as a cargo ship.
Tirranna	Germany	World War II: The captured Norwegian cargo ship was torpedoed and sunk in the Gironde Estuary by HMS Tuna (Royal Navy) with the loss of 87 of the 292 people on board. These included survivors from Kemmendine, Scientist and Tallyrand (all United Kingdom).
Union Jack	Faroe Islands	World War II: The fishing trawler was shelled and sunk in the Atlantic Ocean 100 nautical miles (190 km) north west by north of the Isle of Lewis, Outer Hebrides (59°50′N 7°40′W by U-31 (Kriegsmarine). Her crew were rescued.

== 23 September ==
List of shipwrecks: 23 September 1940
Ship	State	Description
Heimdal	Germany	World War II: The cargo ship was torpedoed and sunk in the North Sea 7 nautical miles (13 km) north west of Terschelling, Friesland, Netherlands by HMS H49 (Royal Navy). Also reported as striking a mine and sinking off Terschelling on 19 or 23 September.
L'Audacieux	(France) Vichy French Navy	World War II: Battle of Dakar: The destroyer was shelled and damaged by HMAS Australia (Royal Australian Navy) in the Atlantic Ocean off Dakar, French West Africa and was beached.
Persée	(France) Vichy French Navy	World War II: Battle of Dakar: The Redoutable-class submarine was shelled and sunk in the Atlantic Ocean off Dakar, Senegal by HMS Dragon, HMS Foresight, and HMS Inglefield (all Royal Navy). A crew member was killed.
Stad Maastricht	Netherlands	World War II: The tanker was torpedoed by S-59 (Kriegsmarine). She sank on 25 September.
Tacoma	Vichy France	World War II: Battle of Dakar: The cargo ship was shelled and damaged in the Atlantic Ocean off Dakar by a British warship with the loss of six of her 30 crew. She was beached.

== 24 September ==
List of shipwrecks: 24 September 1940
Ship	State	Description
Ajax	(France) Vichy French Navy	Ajax sinking. World War II: Battle of Dakar: The Redoutable-class submarine was bombed and sunk in the Atlantic Ocean off Dakar, French West Africa, by aircraft based on HMS Ark Royal (Royal Navy). All 61 crew were rescued by HMS Fortune (Royal Navy).
Bass Rock	United Kingdom	World War II: The fishing trawler was bombed and sunk in the Atlantic Ocean 23 nautical miles (43 km) south by west of Old Head of Kinsale, County Cork, Ireland by Luftwaffe aircraft with the loss of four of her crew.
Continental Coaster	United Kingdom	World War II: The coaster (555 GRT) was torpedoed and sunk in the North Sea off Happisburgh, Norfolk (52°59′N 2°10′E) by S-30 (Kriegsmarine) with the loss of four of her crew.
HMT Loch Inver	Royal Navy	World War II: The naval trawler struck a mine and sank in the North Sea off Harwich, Essex with the loss of 15 of her crew.
HMS MTB 15	Royal Navy	World War II: The BPB 60-foot type motor torpedo boat struck a mine and sank in the North Sea 30 nautical miles (56 km) north east of North Foreland, Kent.
Ostmark	Kriegsmarine	World War II: The seaplane tender was torpedoed and sunk in the Bay of Biscay south west of Saint-Nazaire, Loire-Inférieure, France (47°01′N 3°02′W) by HMS Tuna (Royal Navy) with the loss of one of her 51 crew.
HMS Wellesley	Royal Navy	World War II: The Black Prince-class ship of the line was bombed and sunk in the River Thames during a Luftwaffe air raid.

== 25 September ==
List of shipwrecks: 25 September 1940
Ship	State	Description
Eurymedon	United Kingdom	World War II: Convoy OB 217: The cargo ship was torpedoed and damaged in the Atlantic Ocean west of Ireland (53°34′N 20°23′W) by U-29 (Kriegsmarine). She sank two days later (53°24′N 18°37′W) with the loss of 29 of the 93 people on board. Survivors were rescued by HMCS Ottawa (Royal Canadian Navy) and HMS Primrose (Royal Navy).
Mabriton	United Kingdom	World War II: The cargo ship was torpedoed and sunk in the Atlantic Ocean (56°12′N 23°00′W) by U-32 (Kriegsmarine) with the loss of twelve of her 37 crew. Survivors were rescued by HMS Jason and HMS Rochester (both Royal Navy).
HMS Resolution	Royal Navy	World War II: Battle of Dakar: The Revenge-class battleship was torpedoed and severely damaged by Bévéziers ( (France) Vichy French Navy). Repairs took until February 1942 to complete.
F34 Rina Croce	Regia Marina	World War II: The auxiliary patrol vessel (569 GRT) struck a mine and sank in the Adriatic Sea 2.5 nautical miles (4.6 km) off Brindisi. Seven crew were lost.
HMT Stella Sirius	Royal Navy	World War II: The anti-submarine trawler was bombed and sunk at Gibraltar by Vichy French Air Force aircraft with the loss of twelve of her crew. Survivors were rescued by HMT Arctic Ranger (Royal Navy).
Sulairia	United Kingdom	World War II: The cargo ship was torpedoed and sunk in the Atlantic Ocean west of Ireland (53°43′N 20°10′W) by U-43) (Kriegsmarine) with the loss of one of her 57 crew. Survivors were rescued by HMCS Ottawa (Royal Canadian Navy).
HMT White Daisy	Royal Navy	The naval trawler foundered in the North Sea east of the Shetland Islands.

== 26 September ==
List of shipwrecks: 26 September 1940
Ship	State	Description
Asgerd	Norway	World War II: The cargo ship straggled behind the convoy. She was either torpedoed and sunk in the Atlantic Ocean west of the Hebrides, United Kingdom (56°34′N 9°10′W) by U-137 (Kriegsmarine), or was bombed and sunk at that position by a Focke-Wulf Fw 200 aircraft of the Luftwaffe. All seventeen crew were lost.
Ashantian	United Kingdom	World War II: Convoy ONS 3: The cargo ship was torpedoed and damaged in the Atlantic Ocean (55°10′N 11°00′W) by U-137 (Kriegsmarine) with the loss of sixteen of the 67 people on board. Survivors abandoned ship, but reboarded her at daybreak. They were later rescued by HMS Gloxinia (Royal Navy). The drifting Ashantian was boarded by personnel from HMT Wolves (Royal Navy) and anchored off the coast of Ireland (54°21′N 9°46′W). She was later taken in tow by HMS Seaman and HMS Superman (both Royal Navy) and beached in Kames Bay. Refloated in May 1941, she was repaired, and returned to service in September 1941.
Coast Wings	United Kingdom	World War II: Convoy OG 43: The cargo ship straggled behind the convoy. She was torpedoed and sunk in the Atlantic Ocean south west of Ireland by U-46 (Kriegsmarine) with the loss of all sixteen crew.
Corrientes	United Kingdom	World War II: The cargo ship was torpedoed and severely damaged in the Atlantic Ocean 600 nautical miles (1,100 km) west of Achill Head, County Mayo, Ireland (53°49′N 24°19′W) by U-32 (Kriegsmarine) She was torpedoed, shelled and sunk by U-37 (Kriegsmarine) on 28 September. All 50 crew were rescued by Kolsnaren (Sweden).
Darcoila	United Kingdom	World War II: Convoy OB 216: The cargo ship was torpedoed and sunk in the Atlantic Ocean west of Ireland (53°27′N 24°55′W) by U-32 (Kriegsmarine) with the loss of all 37 crew.
Kosmos	Norway	World War II: The whale oil tanker was captured and scuttled in the South Atlantic (00°30′S 32°06′W) by Thor (Kriegsmarine). Her crew survived.
Manchester Brigade	United Kingdom	World War II: Convoy OB 218: The cargo ship was torpedoed and sunk in the Atlantic Ocean north of County Mayo, Ireland (54°53′N 10°22′W) by U-137 (Kriegsmarine) with the loss of 58 of her 62 crew. Survivors were rescued by the hospital ship Canada (Free French Naval Forces).
Port Denison	United Kingdom	World War II: Convoy OA 220: The cargo ship was bombed and damaged in the North Sea 6 nautical miles (11 km) north east of Peterhead Aberdeenshire by Luftwaffe aircraft. She sank the next day 7 nautical miles (13 km) west of Rattray Head, Aberdeenshire with the loss of sixteen of her 83 crew. Survivors were rescued by HMT Pentland Firth (Royal Navy).
Siljan	Sweden	World War II: The cargo ship was torpedoed and sunk in the Atlantic Ocean 350 nautical miles (650 km) south west of Ireland by U-46 (Kriegsmarine) with the loss of nine of her 27 crew.
Stratford	United Kingdom	World War II: Convoy OB 218: The tanker was torpedoed and sunk in the Atlantic Ocean west of County Donegal, Ireland (54°50′N 10°40′W) by U-137 (Kriegsmarine) with the loss of two of her 34 crew. Survivors were rescued by HMS Gloxinia and HMT Wolves (both Royal Navy).
Tancred	Norway	World War II: Convoy OB 217: The cargo ship was torpedoed, shelled and sunk in the Atlantic Ocean west of Ireland (53°32′N 24°35′W) by U-32 (Kriegsmarine). All 36 crew were rescued by Tricolor (Norway).
Welsh Prince	United Kingdom	World War II: The cargo ship was bombed and damaged north east of Aberdeen by Luftwaffe aircraft. She was on a voyage from London to New York, United States. She put in to Aberdeen. Subsequently repaired and returned to service.

== 27 September ==
List of shipwrecks: 27 September 1940
Ship	State	Description
Diana	Norway	World War II: The cargo ship struck a mine in the English Channel between Lizard Point and Fowey, Cornwall, United Kingdom with the loss of all seventeen crew.
Georges Mabro	Egypt	World War II: The cargo ship was torpedoed and sunk in the Atlantic Ocean west of Ireland (52°00′N 19°00′W) by U-37 (Kriegsmarine) with the loss of all hands.
Vestvard	Norway	World War II: The cargo ship was torpedoed and sunk in the Atlantic Ocean 300 nautical miles (560 km) west of Ireland by U-31 (Kriegsmarine) with the loss of one of her 29 crew.

== 28 September ==
List of shipwrecks: 28 September 1940
Ship	State	Description
Dalveen	United Kingdom	World War II: Convoy HX 73A: The cargo ship was bombed and sunk in the North Sea north of Aberdeenshire (58°10′N 2°19′W) by Luftwaffe aircraft with the loss of eleven of her 43 crew.
Empire Ocelot	United Kingdom	World War II: The Design 1080 ship was torpedoed and damaged in the Atlantic Ocean west of Ireland (54°37′N 21°30′W) by U-32 (Kriegsmarine). She sank at 54°55′N 22°06′W with the loss of two of her 35 crew. Survivors were rescued by HMS Havelock (Royal Navy).
Monte Moncayo	Spain	World War II: The cargo ship struck a mine and sank in the Mediterranean Sea 8 nautical miles (15 km) off Cagliari, Sicily, Italy with the loss of four of her crew.
HMT Recoil	Royal Navy	World War II: The naval trawler struck a mine and sank in the English Channel off Bridport, Dorset with the loss of 25 of her crew.
Shell II	Germany	World War II: The tanker was bombed and sunk in the Scheldt by Royal Air Force aircraft.

== 29 September ==
List of shipwrecks: 29 September 1940
Ship	State	Description
Arizona	Netherlands	World War II: The coaster struck a mine and sank in the Firth of Forth. Only three of her crew survived.
Bassa	United Kingdom	World War II: Convoy OB 218: The cargo ship was torpedoed and sunk in the Atlantic Ocean south west of Rockall, Inverness-shire (54°00′N 21°00′W) by U-32 (Kriegsmarine) with the loss of all 50 crew.
Carmen	Italy	World War II: The cargo ship struck a mine and sank in the Adriatic Sea west south west of Durazzo, Albania.
Henrietta	Australia	The schooner foundered at Port Phillip, Victoria.
Kinabalu	United Kingdom	The cargo ship ran aground on the Batu Mandi Rock, Borneo and was wrecked with the loss of five of her crew.
Vestkyst I	Norway	The coaster collided with Storegut (Norway) and sank off Skibeskjærene. She was later raised, repaired and returned to service.

== 30 September ==
List of shipwrecks: 30 September 1940
Ship	State	Description
HMT Comet	Royal Navy	World War II: The naval trawler struck a mine and sank in the English Channel off Falmouth, Cornwall (50°04′30″N 4°57′30″W) with the loss of fifteen of her seventeen crew.
Gondar	Regia Marina	World War II: The Adua-class submarine was depth charged and sunk in the Mediterranean Sea off Alexandria, Egypt (31°33′N 28°33′E) by HMAS Stuart (Royal Australian Navy) and a Short Sunderland aircraft of the Royal Air Force based at RAF Alexandria. All on board, four Frogmen, who were to pilot manned torpedoes, and 43 crewmen, were rescued by HMT Sindonis (Royal Navy) and HMAS Stuart.
Haulerwijk	Netherlands	World War II: Convoy OB 219: The cargo ship (3,278 GRT) straggled behind the convoy. She was torpedoed, shelled and damaged in the Atlantic Ocean west of Ireland (53°34′N 27°28′W) by U-32 (Kriegsmarine) with the loss of four of her 31 crew. Survivors abandoned the ship, which was shelled and sunk in the early hours of 1 October by U-32.
Heminge	United Kingdom	World War II: Convoy OB 220: The cargo ship straggled behind the convoy. She was torpedoed and sunk in the Atlantic Ocean west of Ireland (53°26′N 18°33′W) by U-37 (Kriegsmarine) with the loss of one of her 26 crew. Survivors were rescued by Clan Cumming (United Kingdom).
Ixia	Union of South Africa	World War II: The cargo ship was bombed and damaged at Peterhead, Aberdeenshire, United Kingdom by Luftwaffe aircraft. She was subsequently repaired and returned to service as Empire Success under the British flag.
Mountpark	United Kingdom	World War II: The cargo ship was bombed and damaged in the North Sea off the coast of Aberdeenshire (57°24′N 1°37′W) by Luftwaffe aircraft. She was subsequently repaired and returned to service.
Samala	United Kingdom	World War II: The cargo ship was torpedoed and sunk in the Atlantic Ocean west of Ireland (approximately 53°N 18°W) by U-37 (Kriegsmarine) with the loss of all 68 people on board.

== Unknown date ==
List of shipwrecks: Unknown date in September 1940
Ship	State	Description
Abbekerke	Netherlands	World War II: The cargo ship was bombed and damaged in the London Docks, United Kingdom by Luftwaffe aircraft between 7 and 9 September.
Antje	Netherlands	World War II: The cargo ship was bombed, set afire and sunk in the London Docks by Luftwaffe aircraft between 7 and 9 September.
Benevis	United Kingdom	World War II: The cargo ship was bombed and severely damaged in the London Docks by Luftwaffe aircraft between 7 and 9 September.
Eastwood	United Kingdom	World War II: The cargo ship was bombed and damaged in the London Docks by Luftwaffe aircraft between 7 and 9 September.
Elna	Estonia	World War II: The cargo ship was bombed and sunk in the London Docks by Luftwaffe aircraft between 7 and 9 September.
Frumenton	United Kingdom	World War II: The cargo ship was bombed and damaged in the London Docks by Luftwaffe aircraft between 7 and 9 September. An unexploded bomb was discovered aboard.
Glenstrae	United Kingdom	World War II: The cargo ship was bombed and damaged in the London Docks by Luftwaffe aircraft between 7 and 9 September.
Gothland	United Kingdom	World War II: The cargo ship was bombed and damaged in the London Docks by Luftwaffe aircraft between 7 and 9 September.
Hetton	United Kingdom	World War II: The cargo ship was bombed and damaged in the London Docks by Luftwaffe aircraft between 7 and 9 September.
Lake Hallwil	Estonia	World War II: The cargo ship was bombed and damaged in the London Docks by Luftwaffe aircraft between 7 and 9 September.
Moena	Netherlands	World War II: The cargo ship was bombed and damaged in the London Docks by Luftwaffe aircraft between 7 and 9 September.
Olympic II	United States	The hulk was rammed and sunk at San Pedro, Los Angeles, California by a Japanese ship.
Otaio	United Kingdom	World War II: The cargo ship was bombed and damaged in the London Docks by Luftwaffe aircraft between 7 and 9 September.
President Francqui	Belgium	World War II: The cargo ship was bombed and damaged by fire in the London Docks by Luftwaffe aircraft between 7 and 9 September.
Prins Frederick Hendrik	Netherlands	World War II: The cargo ship was bombed and damaged by fire in the London Docks by Luftwaffe aircraft between 7 and 9 September.
Prins Maurtiz	Netherlands	World War II: The cargo ship was bombed and damaged by fire in the London Docks by Luftwaffe aircraft between 7 and 9 September.
Reiger	Netherlands	World War II: The cargo ship was bombed, set afire and sank in the London Docks by Luftwaffe aircraft between 7 and 9 September.
Ryal	United Kingdom	World War II: The cargo ship was bombed and damaged in the London Docks by Luftwaffe aircraft between 7 and 9 September.
Sambre	Belgium	World War II: The cargo ship was bombed and damaged by fire in the London Docks by Luftwaffe aircraft between 7 and 9 September.
HMY Sappho	Royal Navy	World War II: The armed yacht, serving as a guard ship struck a mine and sank on 29 or 30 September in the English Channel off Falmouth, Cornwall (50°04′30″N 4°57′30″W) with the loss of 28 of her crew.
Schie	Netherlands	World War II: The cargo ship was bombed, set afire and sunk in the London Docks by Luftwaffe aircraft between 7 and 9 September.
Sherwood	United Kingdom	World War II: The cargo ship was bombed and damaged by fire in the London Docks by Luftwaffe aircraft between 7 and 9 September.
Thea	Netherlands	World War II: The cargo ship was bombed, set afire and sunk in the London Docks by Luftwaffe aircraft between 7 and 9 September.
Tynemouth	United Kingdom	World War II: The cargo ship was bombed and sunk in the London Docks by Luftwaffe aircraft between 7 and 9 September.
Umgeni	United Kingdom	World War II: The cargo ship was bombed and partially sunk in the London Docks by Luftwaffe aircraft between 7 and 9 September. Unexploded bombs were found aboard.
William Cash	United Kingdom	World War II: The cargo ship was bombed and sunk in the London Docks by Luftwaffe aircraft between 7 and 9 September.
