= Convoy HX 72 =

Convoy during naval battles of the Second World War

- Part of World War II
Date	20–22 September 1940
Location	Western Approaches
Result	German victory

Belligerents
Kriegsmarine	Royal Navy

Commanders and leaders
Admiral Karl Dönitz	Comm: R Adm HH Rogers; Escort: Cdr AM Knapp

Strength
8 U-boats	43 ships 5 escorts

Casualties and losses
none	11 ships sunk (72,727 GRT); 2 ships damaged (18,178 GRT); 113 killed

HX 72 was a North Atlantic convoy of the HX series which ran during the Battle of the Atlantic in World War II. The convoy comprised 43 ships, of which 11 were sunk and another damaged by German U-boats, which suffered no losses.

== Background ==
HX 72 was an east-bound convoy of 43 ships which sailed from Halifax on 9 September 1940, bound for Liverpool and carrying war materials.

The convoy comprised contingents from Halifax, Sydney and Bermuda. Its Commodore was Rear Admiral HH Rogers, RNR in Tregarthen.

At this stage of the campaign, escorts were generally limited; convoys were typically unescorted or had only an armed merchant cruiser (AMC) for protection against surface raiders until they reached the Western Approaches. 72's ocean escort was the AMC Jervis Bay, though at sunset on 20 September Jervis Bay detached to meet a west-bound convoy. HX 72 was not due to meet the Western Approaches escort until the afternoon of 21 September, so HX 72 was unprotected when it was sighted at last light by Günther Prien of U-47.

The U-boat Arm (UBW) was also sparse, able to maintain only a few boats at any one time in the North Atlantic, operating at the edge of the Western Approaches to intercept convoys before their escort had joined. U-47 was on weather duty, her armament depleted after an attack on Convoy SC 2 earlier that month, and was able only to report contact.

After reporting the convoy, Prien shadowed the convoy, while U-boat Control (BdU) summoned all available U-boats. During the night and following day a pack of 6 boats was gathered, U-99 and U-65, which were nearby, and others en route from Germany.

== Action ==
Otto Kretschmer, in U-99 made contact around midnight of 20/21 September and attacked, hitting Invershannon. Rogers ordered a turn to port to try to shake off the attack, but this failed; U-99 attacked again, hitting Baron Blythswood, which sank, and Elmbank, which was disabled. U-99 and U-47 then attacked Elmbank with gunfire, but she did not sink until morning, at which point U-99 left the scene to return to Lorient.

U-48 arrived before dawn, and sank Blairangus, which was straggling. Rogers dropped smoke and turned again, to try to shake off his pursuers, but failed once more; U-47 and U-48 continued to shadow throughout the daylight on the 21st.

On 21 September, Prien and Bleichrodt were joined by 4 other boats of the 2nd U-boat Flotilla, U-65, U-38, U-43 and U-32, while U-100 arrived at nightfall.

However, that afternoon, the Western Approaches escort also arrived, causing the U-boats to draw back. At this stage, escorts usually arrived piecemeal, but by evening 5 warships had arrived: the sloop Lowestoft, destroyer Shikari and three corvettes, Calendula, Heartsease and La Malouine.

At nightfall on 21/22 September, U-100 struck, entering the convoy to attack at close range. Attacking before moonrise Joachim Schepke hit three ships within minutes, confusing. Canonesa, Torinia and Dalcairn were sunk, and the convoy began to scatter in confusion. The escort sought to retaliate, but searched outside the convoy perimeter, where the rest of the pack was gathered; they were unable to find Schepke, but were able to frustrate further attacks. U-48 hit Broompark, which was damaged, but no other boat was successful. Just after midnight U-100 struck again, sinking 3 more ships: Empire Airman, Scholar, and Frederick S Fales. She also attacked Harlingen, but was spotted; Harlingen avoided the torpedoes aimed at her, and returned fire with her stern gun, scoring several hits, but causing little damage.

As the convoy broke up, two more ships were hit; U-100 sank Simla, while U-32 damaged Collegian.

This was the end of the action; HX 72 was scattered, but the U-boats were unable to pursue, as the presence of the escorts had forced them to submerge. The remaining ships of HX 72 proceeded independently, while the escorts tried to gather the convoy back together, but no further attacks took place and all remaining ships reached port safely.

== Conclusion ==
HX 72 had lost 11 ships of 72,727 gross register tons, of which Kretschmer sank three and Schepke seven ships. Whilst undoubtedly a victory, and a vindication of Dönitz's wolfpack tactic, most of the UBW's successes were achieved by two of its aces using their high-risk tactic of penetrating the convoy to attack from within. The other boats following the more traditional approach from the flank, and at longer range, were far less successful.

== Table ==
Allied ships sunk

Date	Name	Nationality	Casualties	Tonnage (GRT)	Sunk by...
20/21 September 1940	Invershannon	United Kingdom	16	9,154	U-99
20/21 September 1940	Baron Blythswood	United Kingdom	34	3,668	U-99
21 September 1940	Elmbank	United Kingdom	1	5,156	U-99, U-47
21 September 1940	Blairangus	United Kingdom	7	4,409	U-48
21/22 September 1940	Canonesa	United Kingdom	1	8,286	U-100
21/22 September 1940	Torinia	United Kingdom	5	10,364	U-100
21/22 September 1940	Dalcairn	United Kingdom	none	4,608	U-100
21/22 September 1940	Empire Airman	United Kingdom	33	6,586	U-100
21/22 September 1940	Scholar	United Kingdom	none	3,940	U-100
21/22 September 1940	Frederick S. Fales	United Kingdom	11	10,525	U-100
22 September 1940	Simla	Norway	5	6,031	U-100
