= HMS Shikari =

Destroyer of the Royal Navy

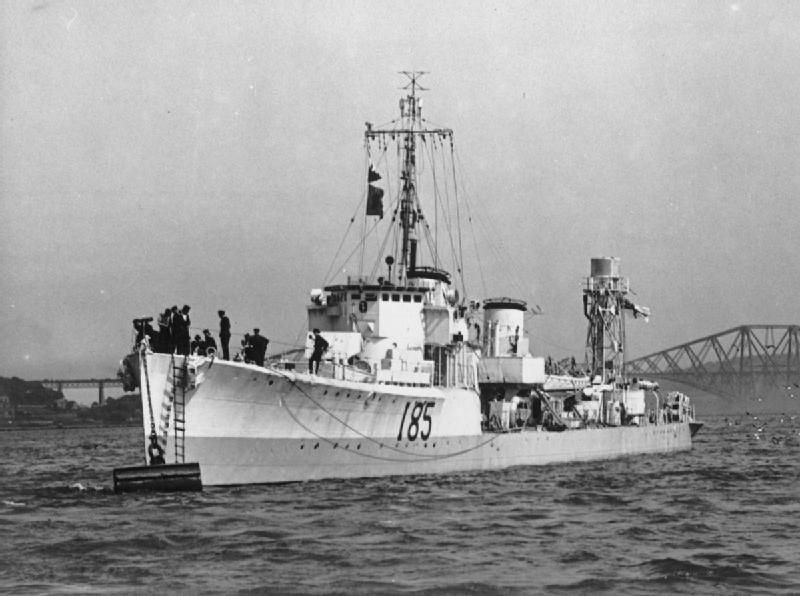
- HMS Shikari during the Second World War

History

United Kingdom
- Name: Shikari
- Namesake: Shikari, an Indian term for a hunter
- Builder: William Doxford & Sons, Sunderland
- Laid down: 15 January 1918
- Launched: 14 July 1919
- Commissioned: April 1924
- Identification: Pennant number: D85
- Fate: Scrapped on 4 November 1945

General characteristics
- Class & type: Admiralty S-class destroyer

HMS Shikari (D85) was an Admiralty S-class destroyer of the Royal Navy. She was built by William Doxford & Sons, Sunderland and launched on 14 July 1919. She was one of the destroyers that took part in the Invergordon Mutiny. In 1933, she was briefly commanded by Frederic John Walker, who was to rise to fame as the foremost Allied submarine hunter of World War II.

On 4 June 1940, Shikari was the last ship to leave Dunkirk.

== Construction and design ==
Shikari was ordered from Doxford Shipyard in April 1917 as part of the first batch of 24 S-class destroyers. The S class were intended as a fast 36 knots (67 km/h; 41 mph) destroyer for service that would be cheaper than the large V-class destroyers that preceded them and so able to be ordered in large numbers. The ships were 276 feet (84.12 m) long overall and 265 feet (80.77 m) between perpendiculars, with a beam of 26 feet 8 inches (8.13 m) and a draught of 9 feet 10 inches (3.00 m). They displaced 905 long tons (920 t) standard and 1,221 long tons (1,241 t) full load. Three Yarrow boilers fed Brown-Curtiss single-reduction steam turbines which drove two propeller shafts, and generated 27,000 shaft horsepower (20,000 kW) at 360 rpm, giving the required 36 knot speed. 301 long tons (306 t) of oil could be carried, giving a range of 2,750 nautical miles (5,090 km; 3,160 mi) at 15 knots (28 km/h; 17 mph). The design gun armament of the S class was three 4-inch (102 mm) guns and a single 2-pounder (40 mm) "pom-pom" anti-aircraft gun. Torpedo armament was four 21-inch (533 mm) torpedo tubes in two twin rotating mounts and two 18-inch (457 mm) tubes.

Shikari was laid down on 15 January 1918, but construction was slowed by the end of the First World War in November 1918, and she was not launched until 14 July 1919. After launching, Shikari was towed to Chatham Dockyard for fitting out. It was decided to use Shikari as a control ship for the old battleship and target ship HMS Agamemnon. As a control ship, Shikari was unarmed, with a large deckhouse for the radio-control equipment fitted between the ship's funnels. She was finally commissioned in February 1924.

Early in the Second World War, (Note: Sources differ as to when Shikari was modified. Whitley states late 1940, with Lenton giving 1941–42 for modification of the remaining S-class ships to escort configuration. Friedman suggests that Shikari and Sardonyx may have been modified later than other S-class ships, stating that these two ships were modified by "mid-1942".) Shikari, along with several other S-class destroyers based in the UK, was modified as a dedicated anti-submarine escort. After conversion, armament consisted of a single 4-inch gun forward, with a 12-pounder anti-aircraft gun amidships. Close-in anti-aircraft armament consisted of two quadruple Vickers .50 machine gun mounts. Both sets of torpedo-tubes were removed, allowing a heavy depth charge armament, with 112 depth charges carried, with sufficient depth charge throwers and racks to allow 14-charge patterns of charges to be used. Type 286 radar and Type 133 Sonar was fitted. Later in the war, the depth charge armament was reduced, with a 10-charge pattern substituted (as this was found to be as effective as the earlier 14-charge pattern). The .50 machine guns were eventually replaced by four single Oerlikon 20 mm cannon, and the 12 pounder anti-aircraft gun removed to allow Type 271 radar to be fitted on a lattice mast aft.

== Service ==
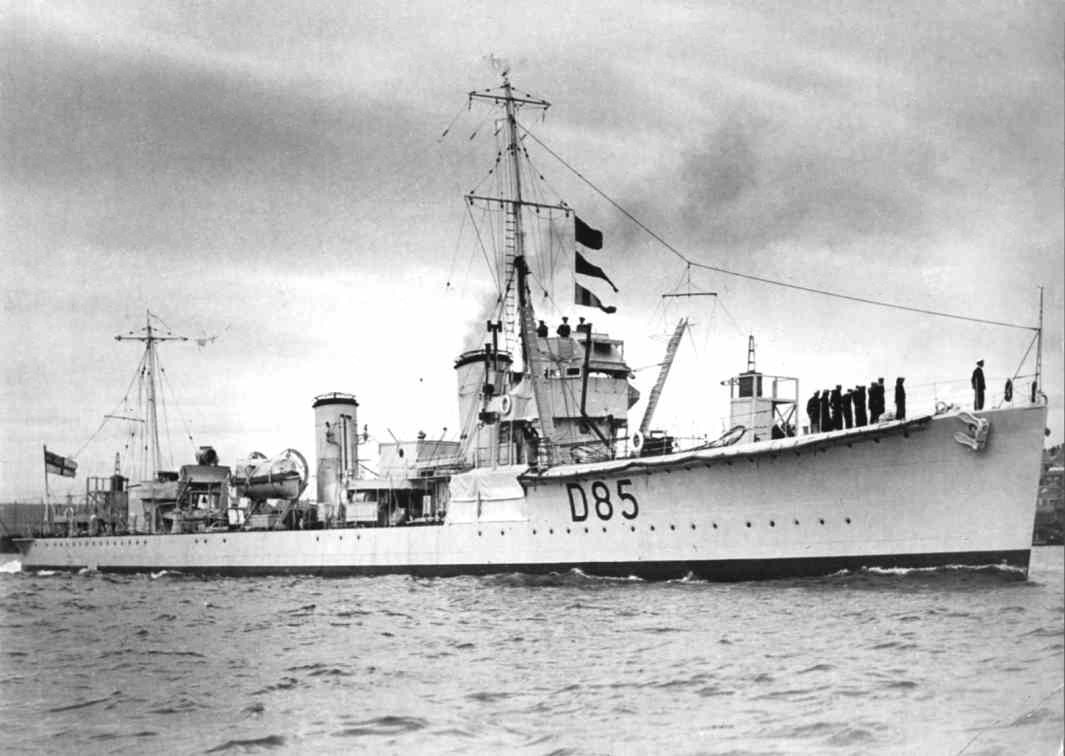
Shikari as a target control ship in 1929

Shikari continued as a control ship for the remainder of the inter war period, first for Agamemnon and then for Centurion. Shikari was present at Invergordon in September 1931 during the Invergordon Mutiny, although there was little trouble on board. Amongst Shikari's commanding officers during the inter-war period was Commander Frederic John Walker, who became a notable anti-submarine warfare commander during the Second World War. On 15 January 1938, Shikari was escorting Centurion from Devonport to Gibraltar across the Bay of Biscay when the heavy weather caused a fault in her port engine, forcing the destroyer to put into Lisbon. On 2 February 1939, Shikari was involved in a collision with the destroyer Griffin off Malta, with Griffin's hull being damaged near the stern.

On the outbreak of the Second World War, Shikari was re-armed and from January 1940 carried out convoy escort operations. At the end of May 1940, the British Expeditionary Force (BEF) was trapped by German forces at Dunkirk, and it was decided to launch Operation Dynamo, the evacuation of the BEF from Dunkirk, and Shikari was one of the destroyers that took part in the operation, carrying out her first evacuation trip on 28 May, making a second trip on 29 May. On 29 May, Admiral of the Fleet Dudley Pound, First Sea Lord, ordered the withdrawal of modern destroyers from the Dunkirk operations owing to the high losses, putting greater pressure on old destroyers such as Shikari. On 1 June, the steamer Prague was badly damaged by near misses from German artillery and bombing. Shikari, along with the sloop Shearwater and the paddle minesweeper Queen of Thanet, took off Prague's load of 3,000 French troops before Prague beached herself on the Sandwich Flats. Shikari herself was damaged by German bombing on 1 June. Shikari continued to make evacuation runs and at 03:40 on the night of 3/4 June 1940 was the last ship to leave Dunkirk. In total, Shikari made seven trips to Dunkirk during Operation Dynamo, embarking 3349 troops.

After Dunkirk, Shikari returned to escort work, and on 4 July, when the cargo ship Dallas City was damaged by German dive bombers and then collided with Flimstone, Shikari took off the crew of Dallas City before the cargo ship sank, surviving unscathed when attacked by German bombers. On 24 July, the French troopship Meknès, repatriating French sailors after the French armistice with Germany, was torpedoed by the German Schnellboot S.27, and Shikari, together with the destroyers Sabre, Viscount and Wolverine rescued the survivors.

On 9 September 1940, Convoy HX 72 left Halifax, Nova Scotia, bound for the UK. The convoy was escorted most of the way across the Atlantic by the armed merchant cruiser Jervis Bay, with an escort of destroyers and corvettes (including Shikari) to protect the convoy for the dangerous final stages through the Western Approaches. Jervis Bay left the convoy on 20 September, before the escort group had rendezvoused with the convoy. The German submarine U-47 spotted the unescorted convoy shortly after Jervis Bay had left, and shadowed the convoy allowing a "wolfpack" of U-boats to be assembled against the convoy. U-boats sank four merchant ships before the escort group, consisting of the sloop Lowestoft, the corvettes Calendula, Heartsease and La Malouine and Shikari arrived. Shikari was tasked with rescuing the crews from the torpedoed merchant ships, while the remaining four escorts stayed with the convoy. Shikari picked up survivors from Blairangus, Elmbank and Baron Blythswood. Attacks on the convoy continued, with seven ships being sunk by U-100 on the night of 21/22 September.

Shikari continued in the convoy escort role in the Western Approaches area, serving with the 2nd Escort Group based at Londonderry in Northern Ireland, and along with sister ship Sardonyx attacked a suspected submarine on 22 December 1940 when escorting Convoy OB 262. On 24 October 1941, Shikari sustained serious damage in high seas south of Iceland, losing a funnel, and was under repair at Belfast until December that year, joining the 21st Escort Group, based at Iceland. Shikari continued in the convoy escort role into 1944, entering reserve and being used for training from September 1944. (Note: Whitley says that the S class were withdrawn to training duties in 1943.)

Shikari was sold for scrap in September 1945, arriving at Cashmore's shipbreaking yard on 4 November 1945.
