= Teodo =

Teodo may refer to:

- Tivat, a town and municipality in Montenegro
- SMS Teodo, a collier of the Austro-Hungarian Navy
- Emiliano Teodo (born 2001), Dominican baseball player
- KK Teodo, a basketball club from Tivat, Montenegro
