= HMS Lowestoft (U59) =

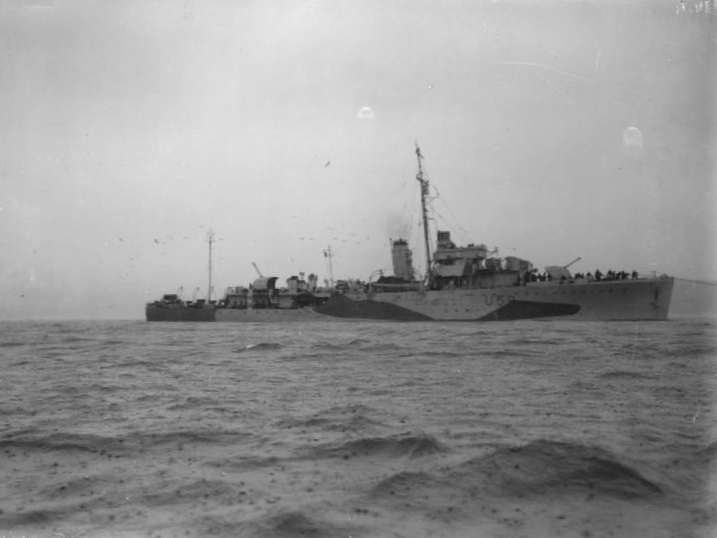
- Lowestoft in March 1943

History

United Kingdom
- Name: HMS Lowestoft
- Ordered: 1 November 1932
- Builder: Devonport Dockyard
- Laid down: 28 August 1933
- Launched: 11 April 1934
- Completed: 22 November 1934
- Decommissioned: June 1945
- Fate: Sold for mercantile service 4 October 1946, scrapped 1955

General characteristics
- Class & type: Grimsby-class sloop
- Displacement: 990 long tons (1,010 t) standard
- Length: 266 ft 3 in (81.15 m) o/a
- Beam: 36 ft (11.0 m)
- Draught: 9 ft 6 in (2.90 m) (full load)
- Propulsion: Two Admiralty 3-drum water-tube boilers; Parsons geared steam turbines; Two shafts; 2,000 shp (1,500 kW)
- Speed: 16.5 kn (30.6 km/h; 19.0 mph)
- Range: 6,000 nmi (11,000 km; 6,900 mi) at 10 kn (19 km/h; 12 mph)
- Complement: 100
- Armament: 2 × 4.7 in (120 mm) Mark IX guns; 1 × QF 3 inch 20 cwt anti-aircraft gun; 4 × 3-pounder guns

HMS Lowestoft was a Grimsby-class sloop of the Royal Navy. Built at Devonport Dockyard in the 1930s, Lowestoft was launched in 1934 and commissioned later that year. She served on the China Station, based at Hong Kong until the outbreak of the Second World War. Lowestoft served as a convoy escort during the war, both in the North Atlantic and off the west coast of Africa.

== Construction and design ==
On 1 May 1933, the British Admiralty ordered two Grimsby-class sloops, Lowestoft and Wellington to be built at Devonport Naval Dockyard as part of the 1932 construction programme. Two Grimsby-class sloops had been ordered as part of the previous year's pattern, and two more would be ordered in both 1934 and 1935, giving a total of eight Grimsby-class ships built for the Royal Navy. Four more were built for Australia and one for India. The Grimsby class, while based on the previous Shoreham class, was intended to be a more capable escort vessel than previous sloops, and carried a more powerful armament.

Lowestoft was 266 feet 3 inches (81.15 m) long overall, with a beam of 36 feet (10.97 m) and a draught of 9 feet 6 inches (2.90 m) at deep load. Displacement was 990 long tons (1,010 t) standard, and 1,355 long tons (1,377 t) full load. The ship was powered by two geared steam turbines driving two shafts, fed by two Admiralty 3-drum boilers. This machinery produced 2,000 shaft horsepower (1,500 kW) and could propel the ship to a speed of 16.5 knots (30.6 km/h; 19.0 mph). The ship had a range of 6,000 nautical miles (11,000 km; 6,900 mi) at 10 knots (19 km/h; 12 mph).

Two 4.7 in (120 mm) Mark IX guns were mounted fore and aft on the ship's centreline. As the 4.7 inch guns were low-angle guns, not suited to anti-aircraft use, a single QF 3 inch 20 cwt anti-aircraft gun (Note: "Cwt" is the abbreviation for hundredweight, 20 cwt referring to the weight of the gun.) was mounted in "B" position. Four 3-pounder saluting guns and eight machine guns completed the ship's gun armament. The initial anti-submarine armament was small, with a design loadout of four depth charges. The ship could be fitted for minesweeping or minelaying (for which the aft 4.7 inch gun was removed, allowing 40 mines to be loaded) as well as escort duties. The ship had a crew of 103 officers and men.

Lowestoft was laid down on 21 August 1933 and was launched on 11 April 1934. She was formally commissioned on 20 November 1934, completing construction on 22 November.

=== Modifications ===
Lowestoft underwent a major refit in 1939, which replaced the 4.7-inch and 3-inch guns with 2 twin QF 4 inch (102 mm) Mk XVI anti-aircraft guns. A quadruple Vickers .50 in (12.7 mm) machine gun mount provided close-in anti-aircraft armament. Anti-aircraft armament was further increased by the addition of a second quadruple .50 inch Vickers machine gun mount and two Oerlikon 20 mm cannon in 1941, together with a single 2-pounder (40-mm) "pom-pom", with the machine guns removed to allow a further four Oerlikon cannon to be fitted in 1942. Anti-submarine armament gradually increased throughout the ship's career. The number of depth charges carried increased first to 40, matching that carried by the last two ships of the Grimsby-class, and later to 60. A Hedgehog anti-submarine mortar was fitted in 1943.

Type 286 radar was fitted during 1941, later supplemented by Type 271 and Type 291, while HF/DF radio direction-finding gear was also fitted.

== Service ==
Following commissioning, Lowestoft joined the China Station, reaching Hong Kong on 15 February 1935. She had suffered boiler problems on the passage from England, and was under repair from arrival at Hong Kong until May 1935. Lowestoft's duties included patrols along the coast of China and regular port visits. In April 1937, Lowestoft exchanged her crew with a fresh crew sent out from the United Kingdom, recommissioning at Singapore before returning to Hong Kong commanded by Commander Sidney Boucher. In January 1938, Lowestoft landed sailors at Chefoo (now known as Yantai) to protect Western interests during a Chinese offensive in the region with the aim of retaking Hangzhou during the Second Sino-Japanese War. Between September and November 1938, Lowestoft was refitted at Singapore. In June 1939, Japan blockaded the British concession in Tientsin (now known as Tianjin) when four Chinese wanted by the Japanese occupation forces took refuge in the British concession. Lowestoft stood by at Tientsin during the stand-off, ready to evacuate British residents if the situation further deteriorated. In July 1939, Lowestoft was refitted at Hong Kong, and was re-armed with 4-inch guns to increase its anti-aircraft capability.

On completion of this refit in December 1939, Lowestoft sailed for Gibraltar, and from there to the United Kingdom, being based at Rosyth as part of the Rosyth Escort Force. Initially she escorted convoys between the Firth of Forth and Moray Firth, where shipping was vulnerable to attack by German long-range aircraft, before transferring to more general convoy escort duties along the East coast of the United Kingdom and in the Western Approaches. On 2 September 1940, Lowestoft, along with the sloop Scarborough, the destroyers Skeena and Westcott and the corvette Periwinkle, joined inbound Atlantic convoy SC.2 as escort. Over the next few days, the convoy was subject to a series of attacks by German U-boats which sank five of the 53 merchant ships of the convoy (four of them by U-47, commanded by Günther Prien). This was the first successful Wolfpack attack of the Second World War. On 9 September 1940, Convoy HX 72 left Halifax, Nova Scotia, bound for the UK. The convoy was escorted most of the way across the Atlantic by the armed merchant cruiser Jervis Bay, with an escort of destroyers and corvettes to protect the convoy for the dangerous final stages through the Western Approaches. Jervis Bay left the convoy on 20 September, before the escort group had rendezvoused with the convoy. U-47 spotted the unescorted convoy shortly after Jervis Bay had left, and shadowed the convoy allowing more U-boats to be directed in attacks against the convoy. U-boats sank four merchant ships before the escort group, consisting of Lowestoft, the corvettes Calendula, Heartsease and La Malouine and the destroyer Shikari arrived. Attacks on the convoy continued, with seven ships being sunk by U-100, commanded by Joachim Schepke, on the night of 21/22 September. The escort was further reinforced by the destroyers Skate and Scimitar on the next morning, and the two destroyers together with Lowestoft drove off a surface attack by the submarine U-32.

On 18 November, Lowestoft was escorting Convoy FN336 off the East coast of England, near her namesake town, when she shot down an attacking German aircraft. On 5 January, Lowestoft was badly damaged when she struck a mine in the Thames Estuary while escorting a convoy. She was under repair at Chatham Dockyard until October that year, with the opportunity taken to fit radar and two Oerlikon 20 mm cannon. She returned to the Rosyth Escort Force, remaining as a part of that formation until April 1942 when she joined the Londonderry-based 45th Escort Group, mainly escorting convoys to and from Freetown, Sierra Leone, West Africa.

On 12 July 1942, Lowestoft collided with the French destroyer Léopard. While the work of repairing Lowestoft was initially assigned to Gibraltar Dockyard, work was slowed by shortages of manpower and material at Gibraltar together with the need to prepare for Operation Torch, the upcoming allied invasion of French North Africa, so in November, she transferred to Falmouth for completion of repair and upgrade work, which continued until April 1943. On completion of this work, Lowestoft joined the 42nd Escort Group, also based at Londonderry, escorting convoys to Gibraltar and Freetown. In August, Lowestoft transferred to the Western African Command, based at Freetown, escorting convoys along the coast of West Africa. In August 1943, Portugal and Britain signed an agreement allowing the Allies to use airbases in the Azores. In order to prepare to use these bases, in early October 1943 the British carried out Operation Alacrity, with a convoy being run to Terceira and Faial islands, carrying stores and personnel to allow the use of these bases for Very Long Range (VLR) maritime patrol aircraft in order to help close the Mid-Atlantic gap, with Lowestoft forming part of the powerful escort for this convoy (including an Escort carrier, nine destroyers and three corvettes).

In June 1944, Lowestoft returned to the United Kingdom for a refit at Dunstaffnage, near Oban in Western Scotland. This refit lasted until October 1944, when she returned to Freetown, joining the 57th Escort Group. In January 1945, the Group, including Lowestoft, transferred to Gibraltar, escorting convoys between Britain and Gibraltar until the end of the war in Europe. Lowestoft returned to Britain in June 1945 and was laid off into reserve at Milford Haven in July.

On 4 October 1946, Lowestoft was sold, becoming the merchant ship Miraflores. She continued in merchant service until being scrapped in Belgium from 5 August 1955.

== Pennant numbers ==
| Pennant number (Note: Although allocated to the ships, Pennant numbers were not normally painted on the sides of sloops until September 1939.) | From | To |
|---|---|---|
| L59 | 1934 | April 1940 |
| U59 | April 1940 | Retirement |
