= Convoy FS 271 =

- Part of The Second World War
- Map of the North Sea
Date	3–5 September 1940
Location	North Sea
Result	German victory

Belligerents
Germany	United Kingdom

Commanders and leaders
Karl Dönitz	

Strength
6 E-Boats	35 merchant ships

Casualties and losses
	5 ships sunk 1 damaged

Convoy FS 271 (3 to 5 September 1940) was a North Sea convoy of the FS series (Forth South) to the Thames, which ran during the Second World War from Methil, Fife on the Firth of Forth on the east coast of Scotland, picking up coasters from more southerly east coast ports, to Southend-on-Sea on the Thames Estuary. The convoy was ambushed by German E-boats on the night of 4 September, that sank five ships and damaged one for no loss, another ship was bombed and sunk in harbour after the voyage.

== Background ==
FS convoys (Forth South), ran from Methil, Fife, a big coal port on the Firth of Forth, to Southend-on-Sea on the Thames Estuary from 1939 to 1945. Ships joined the convoys as they passed their port and the vast importance of coal to the British economy meant that ships spent little time in harbour. Two FS and two FN (Forth North) convoys were usually at sea, the southbound convoys with the code-names Agent and Arena, the northbound ones known as Booty and Pilot. The first FS convoy assembled off Methil and the first FN convoy formed off Southend-on-Sea on 6 September 1939. At the end of November the assembly port for FS convoys was moved to the Tyne to get cargoes moved quicker, ships proceeding to the Tyne independently but losses were so severe that in February 1940 convoy assembly was moved back to Methil.

== Prelude ==
Convoy FS 271 departed Methil on 3 September, escorted by the destroyers HMS Valorous and Westminster.

== Convoy ==
=== 4 September ===
On 4 September, Convoy FS 271 was attacked off Great Yarmouth by the 1st E-boat Flotilla (1.Schnellbootflottille, Kapitänleutnant Karl-Heinz Birnbacher). The convoy was taken by surprise and few of the merchant ships had time to take evasive action. The collier Joseph Swan (1,571 gross register ton [GRT]) was sunk with seventeen of the eighteen-man crew killed. In a survivor's report, Beattie (a member of the crew) described how he had just come off watch when S 18 (Leutnant zur See Christiansen) attacked,

The Chief Officer called down the companion way 'What does six short blasts mean?' I answered 'submarine or track of torpedo on starboard side'.

Beattie looked for the code book to check and there was explosion; when he arrived on deck the rear section of the ship was awash,

All those who were aft at the time had no chance whatsoever ... I saw the master step off the bridge ... and that was the last I saw of him. Then I felt the water round my ankles and the next thing I knew I was in the water. When I came to the surface the ship had completely disappeared.

Beattie was surrounded by the sound of E-boat engines, machine-gun fire "spattering in the water all around me". As Fulham V passed close by he waved a flare and shouted but its captain obeyed orders and left him behind; Beattie found a raft and was rescued at 11:30 p.m. Soon afterwards, Fulham V passed by it was torpedoed amidships to port by S 2 (Leutnant zur See Grund). The explosion sent Captain Ramshaw into the air over the bridge and Fulham V sank quickly. The captain of New Lambton saw two of the E-boats which sank his ship, one being S 21 (Leutnant-zur-See Bernd Klug).

Two E-boats came along our port side about 200 feet off and started to machine gun us and they continued to do this while we launched the boat and for twenty minutes in the boat. We all lay flat in the boat and no-one was injured...the E-boats were about fifty to sixty feet long and had a certain amount of superstructure with a machine gun mounted forward.

In the rush 1./Schnellbootflottille also sank the Dutch collier Nieuwland, the British Corbrook and damaged Ewell, then disappeared into the night.

=== 5 September ===
The surviving ships docked at Southend in the Thames estuary, where Baron Renfrew was bombed and sunk in harbour on 9 September.

== Aftermath ==
=== Analysis ===
The 1./Schnellbootflottille had surprised Convoy FS 271 off Yarmouth and in one pass had sunk four ships and damaged a fifth in a few minutes. The ships had no time to react and the S-Boote kept going after their pass and disappeared into the night. S18 claimed two ships, S21 two ships, S22 claimed a tanker, S54 claimed to have damaged a destroyer, a total of 39,000 GRT but the true total was five coasters of 9,996 GRT, due to mistaken identifications in the dark and chaos of the attack. Similar attacks took place for the rest of September. Up to the end of 1940, attacks by S-Boote continued, the 3./Schnellbootflottille arriving at Vlissingen on 10 September as a reinforcement. A considerable mining effort was maintained by the Luftwaffe, with up to eighty aircraft minelaying at night.

=== Casualties ===
The crew of Corbrook survived the sinking, of the 18 crew on Joseph Swan, 16 were killed and 8 of the crew of Nieuwland were killed.

== Orders of battle ==
=== Ships in convoy ===
Convoy FS 271 (Note: Data from Arnold Hague Convoy Database unless cited.)
Name	Year	Flag	GRT	Notes
Amsterdam	1922	Netherlands	7,329	
Aruba	1916	United Kingdom	1,159	
Baron Renfrew	1935	United Kingdom	3,635	
Baronesa	1918	United Kingdom	8,663	Bombed and sunk at London docks, 9 September
Benledi	1930	United Kingdom	5,943	
Birtley	1922	United Kingdom	2,873	
Brasted	1938	United Kingdom	1,076	
Brockley	1920	United Kingdom	1,564	
Corbrook	1929	United Kingdom	1,729	Sunderland–London, coal; sunk, S-21, 4 September, no casualties
Cordene	1924	United Kingdom	2,345	
Corferry	1937	United Kingdom	1,788	
Cormount	1936	United Kingdom	2,841	
Eastwood	1924	United Kingdom	1,551	
Eleanor Brooke	1938	United Kingdom	1,037	
Ethylene	1921	United Kingdom	936	
Ewell	1926	United Kingdom	1,350	Damaged 4 September, S-54, off Lowestoft
Fulham V	1939	United Kingdom	1,584	Sunk, S-22, 4 September, off Lowestoft
Glynn	1918	United Kingdom	1,134	
Granby	1922	United Kingdom	2,051	
Grit	1934	United Kingdom	501	
Helmspey	1931	United Kingdom	4,764	
Joseph Swan	1938	United Kingdom	1,571	Sunderland–London, coal, sunk, S-18, 4 September, 16 killed
Moorwood	1940	United Kingdom	2,056	
New Lambton	1924	United Kingdom	2,709	Sunk off Lowestoft, S-21, 4 September
Nieuwland	1920	Netherlands	1,075	Sunderland–London, coal, sunk off Lowestoft, S-18, 4 September, 8 killed
Old Charlton	1919	United Kingdom	1,562	
Rimac	1919	Norway	942	
Sambre	1930	Netherlands	349	
Signality	1937	United Kingdom	487	
Sitona	1920	Norway	1,143	
Socony	1936	United Kingdom	4,404	
Sparta	1900	United Kingdom	708	
Spero	1922	United Kingdom	1,589	
Spero I	1920	United Kingdom	1,960	
Western Coast	1919	United Kingdom	1,434	

=== Escorts ===
Convoy escorts
Name	Flag	Type	Dates	Notes
HMS Shearwater	Royal Navy	Kingfisher-class sloop	–5 September 1940	Joined en route
HMS Valorous	Royal Navy	V-class destroyer	3–5 September 1940	
HMS Westminster	Royal Navy	W-class destroyer	3–5 September 1940	

=== E-boat flotilla ===
1./Schnellboot Flottille
Boat	Flag	Type	Notes
S18	Kriegsmarine	S 18 class	
S20	Kriegsmarine	S 18 class	
S21	Kriegsmarine	S 18 class	
S22	Kriegsmarine	S 18 class	
S27	Kriegsmarine	S 26 class	
S54	Kriegsmarine	S 30 class	Attached to 1./Schnellboot Flottille

== Bibliography ==
- Bennett, G. H. (2023). The War for England's Shores: S-Boats and the Fight Against British Coastal Convoys. Barnsley: Seaforth. ISBN 978-1-39-907791-0.
- "Convoy FS 271". Arnold Hague Convoy Database. 2025.
- Hague, Arnold (2000). The Allied Convoy System 1939–1945: Its Organisation, Defence and Operation. London: Chatham. ISBN 1-86176-147-3.
- Hewitt, Nick (2008). Coastal Convoys 1939–1945: The Indestructible Highway. Barnsley: Pen & Sword Maritime. ISBN 978-1-84415-861-4.
- Kindell, Don (2012). "British and Other Navies in World War 2 Day-by-Day Naval Events, September 1940 (Part 1 of 2) Sunday 1st – Saturday 14th". Naval-History Net.
- Roskill, S. W. (1957) [1954]. Butler, J. R. M. (ed.). The War at Sea 1939–1945: The Defensive. History of the Second World War United Kingdom Military Series. Vol. I (4th impr. ed.). London: HMSO. OCLC 881709135.
