= German submarine U-138 (1940) =

German World War II submarine

History

Nazi Germany
- Name: U-138
- Ordered: 25 September 1939
- Builder: Deutsche Werke AG, Kiel
- Yard number: 267
- Laid down: 16 November 1939
- Launched: 18 May 1940
- Commissioned: 27 June 1940
- Fate: Scuttled 18 June 1941 west of Cádiz, in position 36°04′N 07°29′W No casualties.

General characteristics
- Class & type: Type IID coastal submarine
- Displacement: 314 t (309 long tons) surfaced; 364 t (358 long tons) submerged
- Length: 43.97 m (144 ft 3 in) o/a; 29.80 m (97 ft 9 in) pressure hull
- Beam: 4.92 m (16 ft 2 in) (o/a); 4.00 m (13 ft 1 in) (pressure hull)
- Height: 8.40 m (27 ft 7 in)
- Draught: 3.93 m (12 ft 11 in)
- Installed power: 700 PS (510 kW; 690 bhp) (diesels); 410 PS (300 kW; 400 shp) (electric)
- Propulsion: 2 shafts; 2 × diesel engines; 2 × electric motors
- Speed: 12.7 knots (23.5 km/h; 14.6 mph) surfaced; 7.4 knots (13.7 km/h; 8.5 mph) submerged
- Range: 3,450 nmi (6,390 km; 3,970 mi) at 12 knots (22 km/h; 14 mph) surfaced; 56 nmi (104 km; 64 mi) at 4 knots (7.4 km/h; 4.6 mph) submerged
- Test depth: 80 m (260 ft)
- Complement: 3 officers, 22 men
- Armament: 3 × 53.3 cm (21 in) torpedo tubes; 5 × torpedoes or up to 12 TMA or 18 TMB mines; 1 × 2 cm (0.79 in) C/30 anti-aircraft gun

Service record
- Part of: 1st U-boat Flotilla; 27 June – 31 December 1940; 22nd U-boat Flotilla; 1 January – 30 April 1941; 3rd U-boat Flotilla; 1 May – 18 June 1941
- Identification codes: M 02 840
- Commanders: Oblt.z.S. Wolfgang Lüth; 27 June – 20 October 1940; Kptlt. Peter Lohmeyer; 21 October – 31 Dec 1940; Oblt.z.S. Franz Gramitsky; 1 January – 18 June 1941
- Operations: 5 patrols: 1st patrol: 10 – 26 September 1940; 2nd patrol: 8 – 19 October 1940; 3rd patrol: a. 5 November – 1 December 1940; b. 20 – 24 April 1941; 4th patrol: 12 – 27 May 1941; 5th patrol: 12 – 18 June 1941
- Victories: 6 merchant ships sunk (48,564 GRT); 1 merchant ship damaged (6,993 GRT)

German submarine U-138 was a Type IID U-boat of Nazi Germany's Kriegsmarine in World War II. Her keel was laid down on 16 November 1939 by Deutsche Werke in Kiel as yard number 267. She was launched on 18 May 1940 and commissioned on 27 June 1940 with Oberleutnant zur See Wolfgang Lüth in command.

U-138 conducted five patrols, sinking six ships totalling 48,564 gross register tons (GRT) and damaged one vessel of 6,993 GRT.

She was scuttled on 18 June 1941 after being damaged by British warships west of Cádiz in Spain. There were no casualties from her crew of 28.

== Design ==
German Type IID submarines were enlarged versions of the original Type IIs. U-138 had a displacement of 314 tonnes (309 long tons) when at the surface and 364 tonnes (358 long tons) while submerged. Officially, the standard tonnage was 250 long tons (254 t), however. The U-boat had a total length of 43.97 m (144 ft 3 in), a pressure hull length of 29.80 m (97 ft 9 in), a beam of 4.92 m (16 ft 2 in), a height of 8.40 m (27 ft 7 in), and a draught of 3.93 m (12 ft 11 in). The submarine was powered by two MWM RS 127 S four-stroke, six-cylinder diesel engines of 700 metric horsepower (510 kW; 690 shp) for cruising, two Siemens-Schuckert PG VV 322/36 double-acting electric motors producing a total of 410 metric horsepower (300 kW; 400 shp) for use while submerged. She had two shafts and two 0.85 m (3 ft) propellers. The boat was capable of operating at depths of up to 80–150 metres (260–490 ft).

The submarine had a maximum surface speed of 12.7 knots (23.5 km/h; 14.6 mph) and a maximum submerged speed of 7.4 knots (13.7 km/h; 8.5 mph). When submerged, the boat could operate for 35–42 nautical miles (65–78 km; 40–48 mi) at 4 knots (7.4 km/h; 4.6 mph); when surfaced, she could travel 3,800 nautical miles (7,000 km; 4,400 mi) at 8 knots (15 km/h; 9.2 mph). U-138 was fitted with three 53.3 cm (21 in) torpedo tubes at the bow, five torpedoes or up to twelve Type A torpedo mines, and a 2 cm (0.79 in) anti-aircraft gun. The boat had a complement of 25.

== Operational career ==
=== First patrol ===
U-138 departed Kiel on her first patrol on 10 September 1940. Her route took her through the Kattegat and Skagerrak before entering the North Sea. She then reached her area of operations off western Scotland and northern Northern Ireland after negotiating the gap between the Faroe and Shetland Islands.

Her first victim was New Sevilla, quickly followed by Boka and City of Simla. The three ships all went down 52 nmi (96 km; 60 mi) north-west of Rathlin Island on 20 September. The following day, she hit Empire Adventure. The ship sank while under tow by HMS Superman.

The boat docked in Lorient on the French Atlantic coast on 26 September.

=== Second patrol ===
For her second foray, U-138 sank Bonheur and damaged British Glory on 15 October 1940 northwest of the Butt of Lewis in the Outer Hebrides. British Glory was repaired and returned to service in January 1942.

=== Third patrol ===
Patrol number three involved another passage west of the British Isles so that the submarine could safely dock in Kiel, but she did not add to her score.

=== Fourth patrol ===
The boat returned to Lorient on 27 May 1941, having sunk Javanese Prince on the 20th.

=== Fifth patrol ===
U-138 was attacked by the British destroyers HMS Faulknor, Fearless, Forester, Foresight and Foxhound west of Cádiz, Spain, on 18 June 1941. The resulting damage forced the crew to abandon ship and scuttle the U-boat. There were no casualties amongst her crew of 28, who were taken prisoner-of-war and brought to Gibraltar.

== Summary of raiding history ==
Date	Ship Name	Nationality	Tonnage (GRT)	Fate
20 September 1940	Boka	Panama	5,560	Sunk
20 September 1940	City of Simla	United Kingdom	10,138	Sunk
20 September 1940	New Sevilla	United Kingdom	13,801	Sunk
21 September 1940	Empire Adventure	United Kingdom	5,145	Sunk
15 October 1940	Bonheuer	United Kingdom	5,327	Sunk
15 October 1940	British Glory	United Kingdom	6,993	Damaged
15 May 1941	Javanese Prince	United Kingdom	8,593	Sunk

== Bibliography ==
- Busch, Rainer; Röll, Hans-Joachim (1999). German U-boat commanders of World War II : a biographical dictionary. Translated by Brooks, Geoffrey. London, Annapolis, Md: Greenhill Books, Naval Institute Press. ISBN 1-55750-186-6.
- Busch, Rainer; Röll, Hans-Joachim (1999). Deutsche U-Boot-Verluste von September 1939 bis Mai 1945 [German U-boat losses from September 1939 to May 1945]. Der U-Boot-Krieg (in German). Vol. IV. Hamburg, Berlin, Bonn: Mittler. ISBN 3-8132-0514-2.
- Gröner, Erich; Jung, Dieter; Maass, Martin (1991). U-boats and Mine Warfare Vessels. German Warships 1815–1945. Vol. 2. Translated by Thomas, Keith; Magowan, Rachel. London: Conway Maritime Press. ISBN 0-85177-593-4.
