= Sidney Boucher =

English cricketer and Royal Navy officer

- Born: 17 September 1899; Rochester, Kent
- Died: 4 August 1963 (aged 63); Wadhurst, Sussex
- Military career
- Allegiance: United Kingdom
- Branch: Royal Navy
- Service years: 1912–1951
- Rank: Captain
- Commands: HMS Lowestoft; HMS Highlander; HMS Cormorant; HMS Tyne; Senior Officer Reserve Fleet; Director of Physical Training
- Conflicts: Battle of Jutland; Battle of the Atlantic; Pacific Ocean
- Awards: Commander of the Most Excellent Order of the British Empire

Captain Sidney Boucher CBE (17 September 1899 – 4 August 1963), also known as Sam Boucher, was an English Royal Navy officer who fought in both World War I and World War II. He played first-class cricket for Royal Navy Cricket Club between 1923 and 1929 as well as playing one match for Kent County Cricket Club in 1922.

== Early life ==
Boucher was born in Rochester, Kent, the second son of Franklin and Ada Boucher. His father was a solicitor who served as the Town Clerk of Gillingham and in the 1920s was Treasurer of Rochester; he was granted the freedom of the Borough of Rochester in 1932.

Boucher and his brother Noël were both educated at Dumpton House Preparatory School in Ramsgate. From there Boucher went on to the Royal Naval College, Osborne in September 1912 where he became Chief Cadet Captain. In September 1914 he moved on to Royal Naval College, Dartmouth before being appointed to his first naval posting in June 1915.

== Naval career ==
Boucher's first appointment in June 1915 was as a midshipman on the dreadnought battleship HMS Colossus stationed at Scapa Flow as part of the Grand Fleet. He took part in the Battle of Jutland in 1916 before being promoted to sub-lieutenant in early 1918. He was on Colossus when the German High Seas Fleet surrendered on 21 November 1918.

Promotion to lieutenant followed in 1920 and Boucher had qualified as a Physical Training specialist by 1924 before being promoted to lieutenant commander in 1928 and then commander in 1934. He commanded HMS Lowestoft in the Far East between 1936 and 1938 during the Second Sino-Japanese War and by the start of World War II he held the post of assistant director of physical training and sports at the Admiralty. During World War II he worked as a liaison officer with the Army until 1941 when he was given command of HMS Highlander, an H-class destroyer, and assumed command of the 9th Escort Flotilla. He was promoted to captain in 1942 and took command of HMS Cormorant, the Royal Naval receiving ship at Gibraltar. He was Mentioned in Dispatches during this command.

Towards the end of 1944 Boucher was appointed captain of HMS Tyne, a Hecla-class Destroyer depot ship in the British Pacific Fleet. He served as chief staff officer and then flag captain to the rear admiral (destroyers) of the Pacific Fleet until the end of the war in the Pacific. He was appointed a CBE for his war service.

Boucher saw out the remainder of his Navy career as senior officer of the Reserve Fleet and then as director of physical training at the Admiralty. He was made aide-de-camp to King George VI in January 1951 and retired from the Navy later the same year.

== Cricket career ==
Sidney Boucher
Cricket information
- Batting: Left-handed
- Bowling: Left-arm medium

Domestic team information
- Years: Team
- 1922: Kent
- 1923–1936: Royal Navy
- First-class debut: 3 June 1922 Kent v Hampshire
- Last First-class: 31 July 1936 Royal Navy v RAF

Career statistics
Competition	First-class
Matches	9
Runs scored	147
Batting average	9.80
100s/50s	0/0
Top score	43
Balls bowled	1,432
Wickets	14
Bowling average	43.78
5 wickets in innings	0
10 wickets in match	0
Best bowling	2/15
Catches/stumpings	4/–
- Source: CricInfo, 5 April 2017

Boucher played cricket alongside his brother Noël for The Mote in 1921 and went on to make his first-class cricket debut for Kent at Southampton in 1922 after impressing in a match for Band of Brothers. His naval career meant he was unable to play again for Kent, but he appeared in first-class matches for the Royal Navy Cricket Club between 1923 and 1929 when the club played its final first-class match. He continued to play for the Navy until 1936, captaining the team for a number of years. He was a left-arm opening bowler for the Navy and batted left-handed.

As well as his role in Navy cricket, Boucher was also the Secretary and a selector for the Royal Navy Football Association and the Royal Marines Football Association.

== Later life and family ==
Boucher's brother Noël served in World War I in the Royal West Kents, the Royal Flying Corps and, later, the Royal Air Force. After the war he qualified as a lawyer working in his father's firm in Rochester. He played several times for the Kent Second XI and played alongside Sidney for The Mote. He was President of Kent County Cricket Club in 1964.

Boucher was married twice during the inter-war period, first to Phyllis Ellershaw in 1924 and then Betty Holt in 1938. He died in 1963 aged 63 at his home in Wadhurst in Sussex.

== Bibliography ==
- Carlaw, Derek (2020). Kent County Cricketers, A to Z: Part Two (1919–1939) (PDF). Cardiff: ACS.
