= Convoy SC 2 =

- Part of World War II
Date	6–9 September 1940
Location	North Atlantic
Result	German tactical victory

Belligerents
(Nazi Germany) Germany	United Kingdom; Canada

Commanders and leaders
Admiral Karl Dönitz	Comm: EK Boddam-Whitham; SOE:

Strength
3 U-boats	54 ships 7 escorts

Casualties and losses
none	5 ships sunk 110 killed

SC 2 was an Allied North Atlantic convoy of the SC series which ran during the Battle of the Atlantic in World War II. It was attacked by a wolfpack of German U-boats, losing five merchant ships.

== Background ==
SC 2 was an east-bound convoy of 54 ships which sailed from Sydney, Cape Breton in Nova Scotia on 25 August 1940 bound for Liverpool. It carried war materials and was led by Commodore EK Boddam-Whitham in SS Harpoon.

For the Atlantic crossing SC 2 was escorted by HMS Scarborough, a pre-war sloop that had seen previous service as a survey vessel. At this stage of the campaign escorts against U-boat attack could only be provided in the Western Approaches; the Ocean escort, in this case a sloop, but usually an Armed Merchant Cruiser, was provided to give some protection against surface raiders.

SC 2 was opposed by a patrol line of three U-boats, positioned at the limit of endurance to intercept east-bound convoys before the Western Approaches escort had joined.

U-boat Command (BdU) had been informed of SC 2's passage by B-Dienst, the German signals intelligence branch, which had cracked the Royal Navy's codes. BdU had just five U-boats on station in the Atlantic, and ordered U-47 to intercept and shadow while the other boats homed in on his directions. One of these, U-124, was unavailable, being on weather reporting duty; while another, U-28 was short of fuel and unable to head further west. The remaining two, U-65 and U-101, moved west to join the search.

U-47 headed west to find SC 2; on the way she met convoy OB 207, which she attacked on 3 September, sinking a freighter.

On 4 September the three U-boats formed a patrol line at Longitude 20 West, on the fringe of the Western Approaches.

== Action ==
On 6 September 1940 U-65 sighted the convoy and notified BdU and the others, but was unable to attack in heavy seas. U-101 fell out of the chase with engine trouble, leaving only U-47 to join the attack.

In the early hours of 7 September U-47 made a series of attacks, and succeeded in sinking three ships, the freighters Neptunian, Jose de Larrinaga and the Norwegian, Gro.

On the same day SC 2 was joined by its Western Approaches escort, a mixed bag of 2 destroyers, a sloop, a corvette and 2 trawlers, which arrived from other duties at various times during the day. As was common at this point in the campaign this force was an ad hoc formation, with no background of having worked or exercised together; command was exercised by the senior officer present, and could change with each new arrival. All told the arrivals were: the destroyer Westcott; the sloop Lowestoft and two trawlers; and the destroyer Skeena and corvette Periwinkle.

U-47 continued to shadow but was unable to mount a further attack until the night of 8/9 September when she sank the Greek freighter Possidon, at a point west of the Hebrides. Before dawn on 9 September U-28 also made contact, and attacked, sinking Mardinian.

With this the assault on SC 2 ended; the pack had sunk five ships without suffering loss or damage. Later that day the convoy met its local escort, and, entering the North Channel arrived without further loss in Liverpool on 10 September 1940.

== Conclusion ==
This was one of the first occasions where the U-boat Arm had carried out a successful wolf pack attack. Previous attempts to form wolf packs, with control exercised at sea by a senior U-boat commander, had met with failure. Following the fall of France and BdU's move to Kerneval on the French Atlantic coast, a new approach was being tried, with Donitz micro-managing operations from headquarters. This was a success, and set the pattern for wolf pack operations throughout the rest of the Atlantic campaign.

For Britain, the loss of five ships was unpleasant, as was the failure of the escort to inflict any damage on the attackers. However the safe arrival of forty nine ships was an overall success.

== Tables ==
=== Allied ships sunk ===
Date	Name	Nationality	Casualties	Tonnage (GRT)	Sunk by...
7 September 1940	Neptunian	United Kingdom	36	5,155	U-47
7 September 1940	Jose de Larrinaga	United Kingdom	40	5,303	U-47
7 September 1940	Gro	Norway	11	4,211	U-47
9 September 1940	Possidon	Greece	17	3,840	U-47
9 September 1940	Mardinian	United Kingdom	6	2,434	U-28
