= SS Empire Adventure =

World War II merchant ship of the United Kingdom

History
- Name: Eastney (1920–1924); Germaine L D (1924–1931); Andrea (1931–1940); Empire Adventure (1940)
- Owner: Romney Steamship Co Ltd, London (1921–1924); L Dreyfus et Compagnie, France (1924–1931); Società Anonima di Navigazione Corrado, Genoa (1931–1940); Ministry of War Transport (1940)
- Operator: Owner operated except:-; Runciman Shipping Co Ltd (1940)
- Port of registry: (United Kingdom of Great Britain and Ireland) London (1921–1922); (United Kingdom) London (1922–1924); (France) Dunkirk (1924–1931); (Italy) Genoa (1931–1940); (United Kingdom) London (1940)
- Builder: Northumberland Shipbuilding Co Ltd, Sunderland
- Yard number: 256
- Launched: 13 October 1920
- Completed: February 1921
- Identification: UK Official Number 146165 (1921–1924, 1940); Italian Official Number 1829 (1931–1940); Code Letters NDAT (1931–1933); Code letters IBXA (1933–1940); Code letters GLXW (1940)
- Fate: Torpedoed night of 20/21 September 1940, sank 23 September 1940

General characteristics
- Tonnage: 5,145 GRT
- Length: 375 ft (114.30 m)
- Beam: 51 ft 2 in (15.60 m)
- Depth: 31 ft 7 in (9.63 m)
- Propulsion: 1 x triple expansion steam engine (Wallsend Slipway Co Ltd, Newcastle) 370 NHP
- Speed: 11 knots (20 km/h)
- Complement: 39

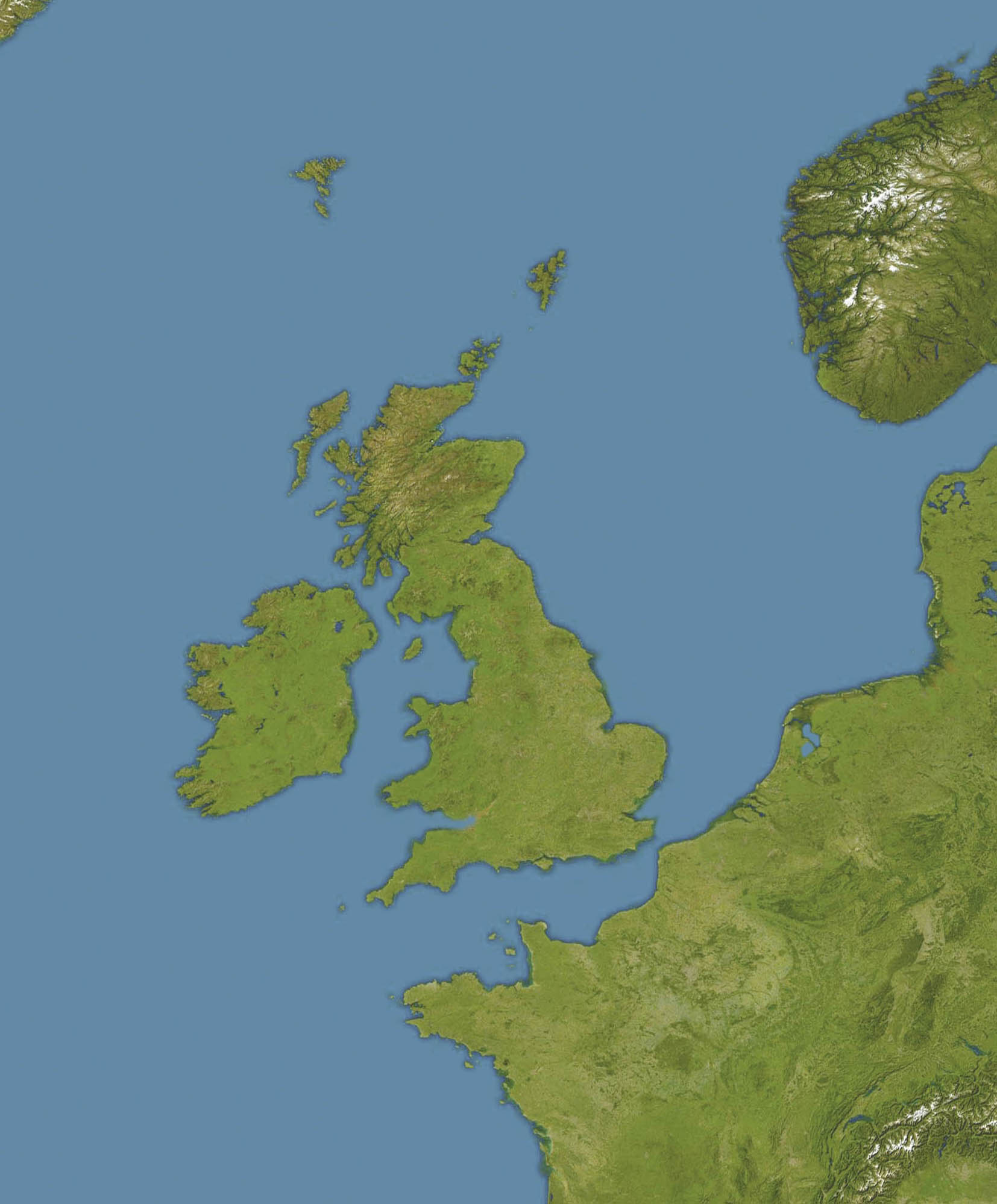
Location of the torpedo attack and sinking of Empire Adventure

SS Empire Adventure was a 5,787-ton steamship built in 1920 as Eastney. She was sold to a company in France in 1924 and renamed Germaine L D. In 1931 she was sold to a company based in Italy, being renamed Andrea, and then seized by the British Government in 1940 and renamed Empire Adventure. She was torpedoed on the night of 20/21 September 1940 and sank while under tow on 23 September 1940.

== History ==
Eastney was built by the Northumberland Shipping Co, Howdon, Wallsend, as yard number 356. She was owned and operated by the Romney Steamship Co, London. In 1924, Eastney was sold to L Dreyfus & Co, France, and renamed Germaine L D. On 25 March 1929, she was in collision with Alice Marie in the North Sea off Vlissingen, Netherlands. She was beached at Rammekens for temporary repairs to be carried out. Germaine L D was refloated the next day. On 3 March 1931, she collided with Southborough (Note: Not the SS Southborough sunk late in World War I.) at Rotterdam, Netherlands. Southborough sustained some damage but Germaine L D was undamaged. On 23 March 1932, she ran aground at Buenos Aires, Argentina, but was freed the next day with assistance from a tug. No damage was sustained. In 1932, Germaine L D was sold to Società Anonima di Navigazione Corrado, Genoa, and renamed Andrea. In June 1940, Andrea was seized at Newcastle upon Tyne and renamed Empire Adventure.

=== Convoy OB 216 ===
Convoy OB 216 departed from Liverpool on 19 September 1940. During the night of 20/21 September 1940, Empire Adventure was torpedoed by U-138 52 miles (84 km) northwest of Rathlin Island 55°11′N 11°30′W. Although taken in tow by HMS Superman, Empire Adventure sank on 23 September 1940 at 55°48′N 07°22′W. A total of 21 of the 39 crew were killed. The survivors were picked up by HMS Arabis and the Swedish merchantman Industria and landed at Belfast. Those lost on Empire Adventure are commemorated at the Tower Hill Memorial, London.

== Official number and code letters ==
Official Numbers were a forerunner to IMO Numbers.

Eastney and Empire Adventure had the UK Official Number 146165 Andrea had the Italian Official Number 1829.

Andrea used the Code Letters NDAT and IBXA. Empire Adventure used the Code Letters GLXW.
