= SS Canonesa =

Coordinates: 54°55′N 18°25′W

History

United Kingdom
- Name: Canonesa
- Namesake: Spanish for "canoness"
- Owner: Furness, Houlder Argentine Lines
- Operator: Furness, Houlder Argentine Lines
- Port of registry: Liverpool
- Builder: Workman, Clark & Co, Belfast
- Yard number: 449
- Launched: 6 March 1920
- Completed: 4 November 1920
- Identification: UK official number 143660; code letters KGQB (until 1933); call sign GKCM (1934 onward)
- Fate: Sunk by torpedo, 21 September 1940

General characteristics
- Class & type: WW1 standard type G
- Type: refrigerated cargo ship
- Tonnage: 8,286 GRT, 5,102 NRT
- Length: 450.2 ft (137.2 m)
- Beam: 58.3 ft (17.8 m)
- Depth: 37.1 ft (11.3 m)
- Decks: 3
- Propulsion: 2 × steam turbines, 1 × screw
- Speed: 14 knots (26 km/h)
- Capacity: 456,576 cubic feet (12,929 m^{3})
- Crew: 61 + 1 DEMS gunner

SS Canonesa was a refrigerated cargo steamship that was built in Ireland in 1920 and sunk by a u-boat in the Atlantic Ocean in 1940.

Furness, Houlder Argentine Lines owned and operated her throughout her career. This was a joint venture between Furness, Withy and Houlder Line to carry chilled and frozen meat and other produce from South America to the United Kingdom.

This was the company's second ship to be called Canonesa. The first was a steamship that was launched in 1893 as Buteshire, renamed Bollington Grange in 1915, renamed Canonesa in 1916 and Magicstar in 1919.

== Building and technical details ==
Workman, Clark and Company built the ship in 1920 to the Shipping Controller's First World War standard design G. She was 450.2 ft (137.2 m) long, her beam was 58.3 ft (17.8 m) and her depth was 37.1 ft (11.3 m). She had a single screw powered by a pair of steam turbines via double reduction gearing.

Her holds were refrigerated, with capacity for 456,576 cubic feet (12,929 m^{3}) of perishable cargo.

Canonesa's UK official number was 143660. Her code letters were KGQB until they were superseded in 1934 by the call sign GKCM.

== Second World War ==
In the Second World War Canonesa took part in convoys including SLF 22 from Freetown in Sierra Leone to Liverpool in March 1940 and SLF 38 from Freetown to Liverpool in July 1940.

In September 1940 Canonesa left Sydney, Nova Scotia carrying 7,265 tons of refrigerated and general cargo, including 2,258 tons of bacon, 955 tons of cheese, 379 tons of fish and 250 tons of ham. She joined Convoy HX 72, which had left Halifax, Nova Scotia on 9 September and was bound for Liverpool.

HX 72 had only one escort, the AMC HMS Jervis Bay. On 20 September Jervis Bay left HX 72 to escort a westbound convoy, and on the night of 20–21 September a u-boat wolf pack attacked HX 72.

At 2310 hrs on 21 September U-100 joined the attack by firing a spread of torpedoes at HX 72, hitting Canonesa and two other ships. Canonesa sank in the Western Approaches about 340 nautical miles (630 km) west of Bloody Foreland with the loss of one member of her crew, the 4th Engineer, Tom Purnell. The Flower-class corvette HMS La Malouine rescued 62 survivors.

== Wreck ==
Canonesa's wreck lies at a depth of more than 1,100 m (600 fathoms). It is in what are now the territorial waters of the Republic of Ireland. Ireland's National Monuments Service records it as wreck number W09516.

== Bibliography ==
- Burrell, David (1992). Furness Withy 1891–1991. Kendal: World Ship Society. ISBN 0-905617-70-3.
