= German submarine chaser UJ-121 Jochen =

German fishing trawler and submarine chaser

History

Germany
- Name: 1939: Jochen; 1939: UJ-121 Jochen
- Owner: C Andersen
- Operator: (Nazi Germany) Kriegsmarine
- Port of registry: (Nazi Germany) Hamburg
- Builder: Norderwerft, Hamburg
- Yard number: 721
- Completed: May 1939
- Identification: port letter and number HH 255; call sign DKAL; pennant number UJ-121
- Fate: Sunk by mine, 1940

General characteristics
- Type: fishing trawler
- Tonnage: 523 GRT, 198 NRT
- Length: 178.0 ft (54.3 m)
- Beam: 27.6 ft (8.4 m)
- Depth: 13.5 ft (4.1 m)
- Installed power: 1 × triple-expansion engine; 1 × exhaust steam turbine; 132 NHP
- Propulsion: 1 × shaft; 1 × screw
- Speed: 12 knots (22 km/h)
- Sensors & processing systems: wireless direction finding; echo sounding device
- Notes: sister ship: Uwe

UJ-121 Jochen was a steam trawler that was built in Germany in 1939, and converted into a submarine chaser at the beginning of the Second World War. A mine sank her in the North Sea in 1940, with the loss of 13 of her crew.

== Building and registration ==
In 1938–39 Norderwerft Köser & Meyer in Steinwerder, Hamburg built a pair of trawlers for the fishing fleet of C Andersen. The first was built as yard number 720, and launched on 29 January 1939 as Uwe. Her sister ship was built as yard number 721; launched as Jochen; and completed that May.

Jochen's registered length was 178.0 ft (54.3 m); her beam was 27.6 ft (8.4 m); and her depth was 13.5 ft (4.1 m). Her tonnages were 523 GRT and 198 NRT. She had a cruiser stern, and a single screw. She was equipped with wireless direction finding, and an echo sounding device.

Deutsche Schiff- und Maschinenbau (DeSchiMAG) built her engines in its Seebeck works at Wesermünde in Bremerhaven. Her main engine was a three-cylinder triple-expansion engine. It was supplemented by an exhaust steam turbine, which drove the same propeller shaft via DeSchiMAG's patent Bauer-Wach system of a Föttinger fluid coupling and double-reduction gearing. The combined power of her reciprocating engine plus exhaust turbine was rated at 132 NHP, and gave her a speed of 12 knots (22 km/h).

Andersen registered Jochen at Hamburg. Her port letter and number were HH 255, and her wireless telegraph call sign was DKAL.

== Submarine chaser ==
The Kriegsmarine requisitioned Jochen shortly before the Second World War. She was converted into a submarine chaser, and on 28 July 1939 she was commissioned with the pennant number UJ-121. She joined the 12. U-Bootsjagdflottille ("12th Submarine Chaser Flotilla"), which was formed in September 1939 at Wilhelmshaven.

On 2 September 1940, UJ-121 Jochen was approaching Ostend in German-occupied Belgium when she struck a mine. She sank, and 13 members of her crew were killed. Her wreck blocked the channel that was used by the 2. Schnellbootflottille ("Second E-boat Flotilla").

== Bibliography ==
- Lloyd's Register of Shipping (PDF). Vol. II.–Steamers and Motorships of 300 tons: trawlers, tugs, dredgers, &c. London: Lloyd's Register of Shipping. 1940 – via Southampton City Council.
