= HMS Valorous (L00) =

Destroyer of the Royal Navy

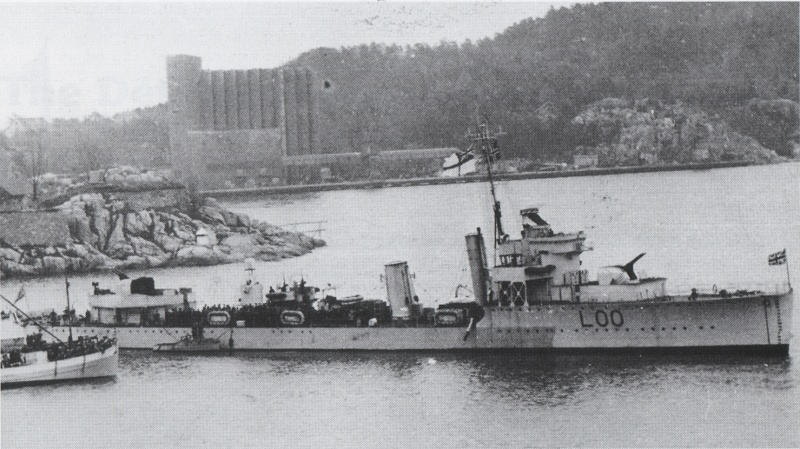
- HMS Valorous (bearing L00 pennant number) during World War II.

History

United Kingdom
- Name: HMS Valorous
- Ordered: April 1916
- Builder: William Denny and Brothers, Dumbarton,
- Cost: £195,500
- Laid down: 25 May 1916
- Identification: Pennant number F.92 (in 1917)
- Renamed: HMS Valorous
- Namesake: valorous
- Launched: 8 May 1917
- Completed: 21 August 1917
- Commissioned: 21 August 1917
- Decommissioned: 1931
- Recommissioned: June 1939
- Decommissioned: either by July 1945 or soon after 15 August 1945
- Motto: Valenter volenter ("Strongly and willingly")
- Honours and awards: Battle honours for: Baltic 1854 (carried forward from the third HMS Valorous); Black Sea 1854–1855 (carried forward from the third HMS Valorous); North Sea 1940–1945
- Fate: For disposal 1946; Sold for scrapping 4 March 1947
- Badge: A Shaheen falcon within a blue annulet on a white field

General characteristics (Admiralty V leader)
- Class & type: Admiralty V-class flotilla leader
- Displacement: 1,316–1,339 long tons (1,337–1,360 t)
- Length: 312 ft (95.1 m) o/a, 300 ft (91.4 m) p/p
- Beam: 26 ft 9 in (8.15 m)
- Draught: 9 ft (2.7 m) standard, 11 ft 3 in (3.43 m) deep
- Propulsion: 3 Yarrow-type Water-tube boilers, Brown-Curtis steam turbines, 2 shafts, 27,500 shp (20,507 kW)
- Speed: 34 kn (63.0 km/h; 39.1 mph)
- Range: 320–370 tons oil, 3,500 nmi (6,482 km; 4,028 mi) at 15 kn (28 km/h; 17 mph), 900 nmi (1,667 km; 1,036 mi) at 32 kn (59 km/h; 37 mph)
- Complement: 115
- Armament: 4 × QF 4 in Mk.V (102mm L/45) guns, mount P Mk.I; 2 × QF 2 pdr Mk.II "pom-pom" (40 mm L/39) anti-aircraft guns; 4 (2x2) tubes for 21-inch (533 mm) torpedoes

The fifth HMS Valorous, ex-HMS Montrose, was a V-class flotilla leader of the British Royal Navy that saw service in World War I, the Russian Civil War, and World War II.

== Construction and commissioning ==
In early 1916, the British Royal Navy had a requirement for a destroyer leader suitable for leading the new, fast, R-class destroyers. To meet this requirement, the Director of Naval Construction prepared the design of a new class of ships, smaller and cheaper than the existing Marksman and Parker-classes, but still capable of accommodating the additional staff required to command the destroyer flotilla and carrying the same armament.

The ships were 312 ft 0 in (95.10 m) long overall and 300 ft 0 in (91.44 m) between perpendiculars, with a beam of 26 ft 6 in (8.08 m) and a draught of 10 ft 8 in (3.25 m) to 11 ft 7 1/2 in (3.543 m) depending on load. The ship's machinery was based on that of the R-class destroyers, with three Yarrow boilers feeding Brown-Curtiss geared steam turbines which drove two propeller shafts. The machinery generated 27,000 shaft horsepower (20,000 kW), giving a design speed of 34 knots (63 km/h; 39 mph). A maximum of 367 tons of fuel oil could be carried, giving a range of 3,500 nautical miles (6,500 km; 4,000 mi) at a speed of 15 knots (28 km/h; 17 mph).

Valorous' main gun armament was four 4 inch (102 mm) QF Mk V guns on CP.II mountings, with two mounts forward and two aft in superimposed positions. These guns, which were provided with 120 rounds per gun, could elevate to 30 degrees, allowing them to fire a 31 pounds (14 kg) shell a distance of 13,840 yards (12,660 m). A single QF 3-inch (76 mm) 20 cwt anti-aircraft gun was mounted aft of the second funnel. Aft of the 3-inch gun, she carried four 21 inch (533 mm) torpedo tubes mounted in pairs on the ship's centre-line.

The ship was ordered in April 1916, and was initially intended to be named HMS Montrose; her keel was laid down on 25 May 1916 by William Denny and Brothers of Dumbarton, Scotland. On 29 September 1916 she was renamed HMS Valorous and she was launched under that name on 8 May 1917. She was commissioned on 6 August and completed on 21 August 1917.

=== Conversion ===
In 1936, the Admiralty recognised that the Royal Navy had a shortage of escort ships with good anti-aircraft armament, suitable for operations along Great Britain's eastern coast. As well as building a new class of escort destroyers designed for this role (the Hunt-class escort destroyers), it was decided to convert a number of old destroyers of the V and W classes, now obsolete as fleet destroyers, to perform a similar role. This programme became known as the "Wair" conversions. The conversion involved the replacement of the ship's entire armament. Two twin QF 4 inch Mk XVI naval gun anti-aircraft mounts were fitted, with a modern fire control system mounted on a new superstructure to direct their fire. Two quadruple Vickers .50 machine gun mounts provided close-in anti-aircraft armament. Modern sonar, and a relatively powerful depth-charge outfit of 30 depth charges provided the ship's anti-submarine equipment. No torpedo tubes were fitted. Valorous was converted to "Wair" standard between November 1938 and June 1939.

== Service history ==
=== World War I ===
Upon completion, Valorous entered service with the 11th Destroyer Flotilla operating with the Grand Fleet during World War I. Before the Armistice with Germany ended the war on 11 November 1918, she had been converted for use as minelayer.

=== Interwar ===
In March 1919, the destroyer flotillas of the Royal Navy were re-organised, with Valorous joining the newly established 1st Destroyer Flotilla of what would become the Atlantic Fleet as one of two leaders. In May 1919, Valorous was deployed with the rest of the 1st Flotilla to the Baltic Sea to participate in the British campaign there against Bolshevik forces during the Russian Civil War. On 27 July 1919, the Bolshevik Bars-class submarine Vepr attempted to torpedo Valorous and the destroyer HMS Vancouver. The two British ships retaliated with depth charges, severely damaging the Bolshevik submarine, which managed to escape and make it back to base at Kronstadt. (Note: The attack occurred on 26 July according to Polmar and Noot, while Dobson and Miller state that Ersh was the submarine involved. Bennett notes that some accounts state that Ersh was sunk by British forces, but that this cannot be confirmed by either British or Soviet records. Both Vepr and Ersh survived the Russian Civil War.) The 1st Flotilla returned home from the Baltic in August, but on reaching their home base of Port Edgar, the men of the unit only received 16 days home leave rather than the promised 21 days. When, on 12 October, the flotilla was ordered to prepare to return to the Baltic, between 150 and 200 men from the ships of the flotilla, including Valorous, deserted. The missing crewmen were replaced by men from the battleships of the Atlantic Fleet, allowing some of the flotilla to sail on 14 October.

On 4 November 1919, the German-backed West Russian Volunteer Army attacked Liepāja in Latvia. The British naval forces at Liepāja, including Valorous the destroyers Winchester, Wryneck and Whitley and the light cruiser Phaeton, later reinforced by the cruiser Dauntless and the monitor Erebus, used their guns to fire on the German attackers, helping the Latvian defenders to drive off the Germans. By the time the fighting at Liepāja ended on 14 November, Valorous had completely exhausted her ammunition.

On 1 April 1920, she transferred to the 4th Destroyer Flotilla, where she operated until 2 February 1923, when she joined the 2nd Destroyer Flotilla. On 15 January 1924, she exchanged flotillas with Valentine, joining the 9th Destroyer Flotilla, a reserve formation where the ships had reduced complements, and from October 1925 was laid up at Rosyth. In July 1926, she was recommissioned to serve as emergency destroyer at Rosyth, with the task continuing until December that year. From February 1927, Valorous was laid up at Sheerness, where she was refitted from March to June 1927. Valorous remained in reserve at Sheerness until April 1932, when she recommissioned into the 2nd Destroyer Flotilla of the Atlantic Fleet, replacing Vanquisher. She served with the 2nd Flotilla until August 1935, and in September she joined the 19th Destroyer Flotilla based at Malta, newly set up as a response to the Abyssinia Crisis. Valorous suffered serious engine room flooding during operations in September 1935, and was under repair at Malta until March 1936, and was then docked at Sheerness from April to June 1936. Following the outbreak of the Spanish Civil War, Valorous operated off the northern coat of Spain from 28 July to 28 August 1936.

On 20 October 1936, Valorous was reduced to reserve at Chatham. In 1938, the Royal Navy selected Valorous for conversion into an anti-aircraft escort under the naval rearmament programme, and she entered Chatham Dockyard for the required work on 30 October that year. Upon its completion, she was recommissioned on 30 June 1939, serving as a training ship for the Clyde division of the Royal Naval Volunteer Reserve. In August 1939 she was assigned to the escort force at Rosyth, Scotland.

=== World War II ===
When the United Kingdom entered World War II in September 1939, Valorous took up convoy defence duties in the North Sea and Northwestern Approaches with Rosyth Force. In January 1940 her duties were expanded to include the defence of convoys along the east coast of Great Britain and in the English Channel. She did not take part in the evacuation of Allied troops from Dunkirk, France, remaining on convoy escort duties instead. On 11 June 1940, she was escorting Convoy FN 23 when it came under German air attack and, after a German bomb hit and sank the collier Heworth, rescued Heworth's crew.

In July 1940, Valorous's duties expanded again to include anti-invasion patrols. In 1941, after the threat of invasion had subsided, she returned to her convoy escort focus. On 21 June 1941 the flotilla leader rescued the only three survivors of the tanker Vancouver, which had struck a naval mine and caught fire off Sunk Head Buoy, Harwich, with the loss of 45 lives while on a voyage from Shell Haven to Halifax, Yorkshire. Valorous was "adopted" by the civil community of Dewsbury, then in the West Riding of Yorkshire, as the result of a Warship Week National Savings campaign in October 1941.

Valorous interrupted her regular duties in January 1942 to take part in Operation Performance, deploying with the Home Fleet to cover the break-out of merchant ships from Sweden into the North Sea via the Danish Straits. Fitted with a Type 285 fire-control radar for her main armament in 1942 and with Type 286P radar and direction-finding equipment in 1943–1944, the vessel continued her convoy defense duties through the surrender of Germany in early May 1945, not taking part in any operations related to the Allied invasion of Normandy in the summer of 1944.

After Germany's surrender, Valorous supported reoccupation forces, and on 14 May 1945 joined the destroyer Venomous in escorting minesweepers during minesweeping operations at Kristiansund, Norway.

== Decommissioning and disposal ==
Valorous was decommissioned in 1945 – sources differ on whether she had been deleted from the Royal Navy's active list as of July 1945 or stayed in commission until after the surrender of Japan on 15 August 1945 – and placed on the disposal list in 1946. She was sold on 4 March 1947 for scrapping at Thornaby.

== Bibliography ==
- Bennett, Geoffrey (2002). Freeing the Baltic. Edinburgh, UK: Birlinn. ISBN 1-84341-001-X.
- Campbell, John (1985). Naval Weapons of World War II. Annapolis, Maryland: Naval Institute Press. ISBN 978-0-87021-459-2.
- Chesneau, Roger, ed. (1980). Conway's All the World's Fighting Ships 1922–1946. Greenwich, UK: Conway Maritime Press. ISBN 978-0-85177-146-5.
- Cocker, Maurice (1981). Destroyers of the Royal Navy, 1893–1981. Ian Allan. ISBN 978-0-7110-1075-8.
- Colledge, J. J.; Warlow, Ben (2006) [1969]. Ships of the Royal Navy: The Complete Record of All Fighting Ships of the Royal Navy from the 15th Century to the Present (3rd Rev ed.). London: Chatham Publishing. ISBN 978-1-86176-281-8. OCLC 67375475.
- Dobson, Christopher; Miller, John (1986). The Day They Almost Bombed Moscow: The Allied War in Russia 1918–1920. New York: Atheneum. ISBN 978-0-68911-713-8.
- Dunn, Steve (2020). Battle in the Baltic: The Royal Navy and the Fight to Save Estonia & Latvia 1918–20. Barnsley, UK: Seaforth Publishing. ISBN 978-1-5267-4273-5.
- Dittmar, Fred & Colledge, Jim, eds. (1972). British Warships 1914–1919. Shepperton, Surrey: Ian Allan Ltd. ISBN 0-7110-0380-7.
- English, John (2019). Grand Fleet Destroyers: Part I: Flotilla Leaders and 'V/W' Class Destroyers. Windsor, UK: World Ship Society. ISBN 978-0-9650769-8-4.
- Friedman, Norman (2009). British Destroyers From Earliest Days to the Second World War. Annapolis, Maryland: Naval Institute Press. ISBN 978-1-59114-081-8.
- Gardiner, Robert & Gray, Randal, eds. (1985). Conway's All the World's Fighting Ships 1906–1921. Annapolis, Maryland: Naval Institute Press. ISBN 978-0-85177-245-5.
- Lenton, H. T. (1998). British & Empire Warships of the Second World War. Annapolis, Maryland: Naval Institute Press. ISBN 978-1-55750-048-9.
- Manning, T. D. (1961). The British Destroyer. London: Putnam and Co.
- March, Edgar J. (1966). British Destroyers: A History of Development, 1892–1953; Drawn by Admiralty Permission From Official Records & Returns, Ships' Covers & Building Plans. London: Seeley Service. OCLC 164893555.
- Polmar, Norman; Noot, Jurrien (1991). Submarines of the Russian and Soviet Navies, 1718–1990. Annapolis, Maryland, USA: Naval Institute Press. ISBN 0-87021-570-1.
- Preston, Antony (1971). 'V & W' Class Destroyers 1917–1945. London: Macdonald. OCLC 464542895.
- Raven, Alan & Roberts, John (1979). 'V' and 'W' Class Destroyers. Man o'War. Vol. 2. London: Arms & Armour. ISBN 978-0-85368-233-2.
- Rohwer, Jürgen; Hümmelchen, Gerhard (1992). Chronology of the War at Sea 1939–1945. London: Greenhill Books. ISBN 1-85367-117-7.
- Rohwer, Jürgen (2005). Chronology of the War at Sea 1939–1945: The Naval History of World War Two (Third Revised ed.). Annapolis, Maryland: Naval Institute Press. ISBN 978-1-59114-119-8.
- Whitley, M. J. (1988). Destroyers of World War 2. Annapolis, Maryland: Naval Institute Press. ISBN 978-0-87021-326-7.
- Whitley, M. J. (2000). Destroyers of World War Two: An International Encyclopedia. London: Cassell & Co. ISBN 1-85409-521-8.
