= HMS Calendula =

Flower-class corvette

History

United Kingdom
- Name: HMS Calendula
- Namesake: Calendula
- Builder: Harland & Wolff, Belfast
- Yard number: 1061
- Laid down: 30 October 1939
- Launched: 21 March 1940
- Completed: 6 May 1940
- Commissioned: 6 May 1940
- Decommissioned: 12 March 1942
- Identification: Pennant number: K28
- Fate: Transferred to United States Navy

United States
- Name: USS Ready
- Commissioned: 12 March 1942
- Decommissioned: 20 August 1945
- Identification: Hull number: PG-67
- Fate: Returned to Royal Navy

United Kingdom
- Name: HMS Calendula
- Commissioned: 20 August 1945
- Decommissioned: 17 September 1945
- Fate: Sold into civilian service, 1945

General characteristics
- Class & type: Flower-class corvette
- Displacement: 925 long tons (940 t; 1,036 short tons)
- Length: 205 ft (62.48 m)o/a
- Beam: 33 ft 2 in (10.11 m)
- Draught: 13 ft 7 in (4.14 m)
- Propulsion: single shaft; 2 × fire tube Scotch boilers; 1 × 4-cycle triple-expansion reciprocating steam engine; 2,750 ihp (2,050 kW)
- Speed: 16.5 knots (30.6 km/h)
- Range: 3,500 nautical miles (6,482 km) at 12 knots (22.2 km/h)
- Complement: 85
- Sensors & processing systems: 1 × SW1C or 2C radar; 1 × Type 123A or Type 127DV sonar
- Armament: 1 × 4-inch BL Mk.IX single gun; 2 × .50 cal machine gun (twin); 2 × Lewis .303 cal machine gun (twin); 2 × Mk.II depth charge throwers; 2 × Depth charge rails with 40 depth charges; originally fitted with minesweeping gear, later removed

HMS Calendula was a Flower-class corvette, built for the Royal Navy during the Second World War, and was in service in the Battle of the Atlantic. In 1942 she was transferred to the United States Navy as part of the reverse Lend Lease arrangement and renamed USS Ready, one of the Temptress-class gunboats. With the end of hostilities she was returned to the Royal Navy and sold into mercantile service.

== Service history ==
Calendula was built at Harland & Wolff, Belfast, as part of the 1939 War Emergency programme. One of the original Flower-class corvettes, she was ordered on 19 September 1939, laid down six weeks later, and launched on 21 March 1940. She was completed on 6 May 1940.

=== Royal Navy ===
After working up, Calendula was assigned to the Western Approaches Escort Force for service as a convoy escort. In this role she was engaged in all the duties performed by escort ships; protecting convoys, searching for and attacking German U-boats which attacked ships in convoy, and rescuing survivors.

Calendula was involved in two major convoy battles. In September 1940 she was part of the escort to convoy HX 72, during which 11 ships were sunk.

In November she was transferred to Freetown, joining the local escort group there. In March 1941 Calendula was with convoy SL 68, which saw the loss of nine merchant ships in a four-day running battle.

In two years' service she escorted 10 North Atlantic and 10 South Atlantic convoys, assisting in the safe passage of over 400 ships, though some were lost subsequently. She also took part in the protection of four "Winston Special" troop convoys.

In March 1942 Calendula was transferred to the United States Navy.

=== United States Navy ===
Following the entry of the United States into the war the US Navy was in need of anti-submarine warfare vessels, and to meet this need a number of ships were transferred from the Royal Navy as part of a reverse Lend-Lease arrangement. Calendula was commissioned into the USN on 12 March 1942 as USS Ready, one of the Temptress-class gunboats. For the remainder of the conflict Ready was employed as a convoy escort in the western Atlantic and Caribbean Sea. With the ending of hostilities Ready was returned to the Royal Navy in August 1945. As HMS Calendula once more she was stricken in September 1945.

== Merchant service ==
Following her de-commissioning Calendula was sold into merchant service. In 1948 she became Villa Cisneros, and was renamed Villa Bens the following year.
