= SMS Teodo =

Collier

History

Austria-Hungary
- Name: SMS Teodo
- Namesake: Teodo (Tivat)
- Builder: Stabilimento Tecnico Triestino (STT), Trieste
- Yard number: 501
- Laid down: 14 March 1914
- Launched: 8 January 1915
- Completed: 17 February 1916
- Fate: Ceded to Italy as war reparation, 1921

History
- Name: 1921: Teodo; 1924: Barbana; 1926: Barbana G; 1940: Empire Airman
- Owner: 1921: Italian Government, Ministry of Transport; 1924: Ministry of Marine, Italy; 1926: Società Anonima di Navigazione Garibaldi, Genoa; 1940: Ministry of War Transport
- Operator: Owner operated except:-; Mark Whitwill & Son Ltd, Bristol (1940)
- Port of registry: 1921: (Kingdom of Italy) Genoa; 1940: (United Kingdom) Newcastle upon Tyne
- Identification: Italian official number 1496 (1926–40); UK Official Number 165788 (1940); Code letters NFVG (1926–40); Code letters GLZT (1940)
- Fate: Sunk, 23 September 1940

General characteristics
- Tonnage: 6,561 GRT
- Displacement: 13,200 tons
- Length: 449 ft 8 in (137.06 m)
- Beam: 55 ft 6 in (16.92 m)
- Depth: 34 ft 1 in (10.39 m)
- Propulsion: 1 × triple-expansion steam engine (STT) 369 hp (275 kW)
- Speed: 14 knots (26 km/h; 16 mph)
- Complement: 112 (as SMS Teodo)
- Crew: 37 (as Empire Airman)

Approximate location of the sinking of Empire Airman.

SMS Teodo was a 6,561-ton collier built in 1915 for the Austro-Hungarian Navy. She was ceded to Italy in 1921 as a war reparation. She was renamed Barbana in 1924 and Barbana G in 1926. In 1940, she was seized by the United Kingdom and renamed Empire Airman. On 21 September 1940, Empire Airman was torpedoed and sunk by the German submarine U-100.

== History ==
SMS Teodo was built by Stabilimento Tecnico Triestino, Trieste as yard number 501 and launched on 8 January 1913, being completed on 17 February 1916. SMS Teodo was a Pola Class collier of the Austro-Hungarian Navy. At the end of the First World War, under Article 137 of the Treaty of Saint-Germain, SMS Teodo was classed as a merchant ship and passed to the Italian Government Ministry of Transport. In 1924, she was passed to the Italian Ministry of Marine and renamed Barbana. In 1926, she was sold to the Società Anonima di Navigazione Garibaldi, Genoa and renamed Barbana G. On 6 November 1929, she collided with the Italian cargo ship Atlantide in the Nieuwe Waterweg at Rotterdam, South Holland, Netherlands. Atlantide was consequently beached. Barbana G was captured off Leith and taken to Methil on 10 June 1940 and passed to the Ministry of War Transport, being renamed Empire Airman under the management of Mark Whitwill & Sons Ltd, Bristol.

=== Convoys ===
Convoy HX 72 sailed from Halifax, Nova Scotia on 9 September 1940. Empire Airman was carrying a cargo of iron ore, she was bound for Cardiff. At 00:22 on 22 September, Empire Airman was hit by a torpedo fired by the German submarine U-100. The ship was taken in tow but sank on 23 September at 55°11′N 15°07′W. Thirty-three of the thirty-seven crew were killed in the attack. Four survivors were rescued by HMS La Malouine. Those lost on Empire Airman are commemorated at the Tower Hill Memorial, London.

== Official number and code letters ==
Official Numbers were a forerunner to IMO Numbers. Barbana G had the Official Number 1496 on the Italian register. Empire Airman had the Official Number 165788 on Lloyds Register. Barbana G used the Code Letters NFVZ. Empire Airman used the Code Letters GLZT
