= HMS La Malouine =

Royal Navy Flower-class corvette

History

France
- Name: La Malouine
- Ordered: 25 July 1939
- Builder: Smiths Dock Co. Ltd, Middlesbrough, England
- Laid down: 13 November 1939
- Launched: 21 March 1940
- Commissioned: June 1940
- Fate: Seized by the Royal Navy, 3 July 1940

United Kingdom
- Name: HMS La Malouine
- Acquired: 3 July 1940
- Commissioned: 29 July 1940
- Identification: Pennant number: K46
- Fate: Scrapped at Gelliswick Bay, 22 May 1947

General characteristics
- Class & type: Flower-class corvette
- Displacement: 925 long tons (940 t)
- Length: 205 ft (62 m)
- Beam: 33 ft (10 m)
- Draught: 11.5 ft (3.5 m)
- Propulsion: Two fire tube boilers; one 4-cycle triple-expansion steam engine; 2,750 hp (2,050 kW)
- Speed: 16 knots (30 km/h; 18 mph)
- Range: 3,500 nautical miles (6,500 km; 4,000 mi) at 12 knots (22 km/h; 14 mph)
- Complement: 85
- Armament: 1 × BL 4-inch (101.6 mm) Mk IX gun; 1 × QF 2-pounder pom-pom; two .50-inch (12.7 mm) twin machine guns, two .303-inch (7.7 mm) Lewis machine guns; two stern depth charge racks with 40 depth charges

HMS La Malouine was a Flower-class corvette of the Royal Navy, serving during the Second World War. Originally ordered by the French Navy (Marine Nationale) under the same name, following the fall of France, the ship was seized by the United Kingdom and commissioned into the Royal Navy in 1940. The corvette remained in service until being broken up in 1947.

== Origin ==
La Malouine was one of four Flower-class corvettes ordered by the Marine Nationale. Only two of these were delivered to the Marine Nationale. One of these ships was La Malouine, the other La Bastiaise. On completion by Smiths Dock Co. Ltd La Malouine sailed for Portsmouth for fitting out. It was here that she was commissioned into the Marine Nationale in June 1940. However, France surrendered to Germany on 22 June 1940. As a consequence of this event La Malouine was seized by the Royal Navy on 3 July 1940 and subsequently commissioned into the Royal Navy, by Lt. Cdr. R.W Keymer RN, on 29 July 1940. Throughout the remainder of the war La Malouine flew both the Tricolore and the White Ensign.

Of the other three ships ordered by France La Bastiaise was destroyed by a sea mine whilst on sea trials at Hartlepool. La Dieppoise and La Pampolaise were never delivered to the Marine Nationale and were commissioned into the Royal Navy as HMS Fleur de Lys and HMS Nasturtium.

== 1940 to mid 1942 ==
La Malouine took part in her first convoy, out of Freetown, Sierra Leone, in September 1940. At the end of September 1940 she formed part of the escort for convoy HX72, sailing from Halifax, Nova Scotia. Eight merchant ships were lost during this convoy. La Malouine alone picking up 146 survivors from the SS Canonesa, Dalcairn, Empire Airman and the Frederick S. Fales. All these ships were sunk by the German submarine U-100. By the end of 1940 she had taken part in nine convoys.

1941 found La Malouine as a member of the 2nd Escort Group operating out of the port of Londonderry, Northern Ireland. On 7 January 1941, in company with another corvette, HMS Anemone, she assisted in the sinking of the Italian navy submarine Nani. On 5 May, during an air raid on Belfast, Northern Ireland, La Malouine was damaged by a near miss and lost two of her crew killed. This required several weeks of repair. By July she was back on active service joining convoy SL81 out of Freetown. This convoy lost six ships, including Kumasian to U-74 on 5 August 1941. La Malouine picked up 59 of the Kumasian survivors. During 1941 La Malouine escorted 10 convoys.

Between January and May 1942 La Malouine was involved in 4 convoys. In February 1942 she was at Gibraltar in company with the corvettes, Bluebell, Stonecrop, Myosotis and Carnation.

== With convoy PQ 17 ==
In June 1942 La Malouine was assigned to the close escort group for Convoy PQ 17. Other corvettes of her class involved were HMS Dianella, HMS Lotus and HMS Poppy. The convoy left Hvalfjord on 27 June 1942 bound for Murmansk. On 4 July PQ was ordered to disperse, 25 of its merchant ships were sunk and only 11 reached the Soviet Union. La Malouine and her sister ships, survived the voyage. La Malouine reached Archangel on 25 July, carrying 20 survivors from the Hartlebury who had been transferred from the cargo ship Empire Tide.

== After PQ 17 to 1945 ==
After her return from the Soviet Union, in September 1942, La Malouine was back in the Mediterranean undertaking 4 more convoys before the end of the year.

1943 began with La Malouine escorting convoy KMS.6G during which, on 6 January, east of Algiers, the merchant vessel Benalbanach was lost along with approximately 400 lives. The period from January to June 1943 was spent escorting convoys from Freetown to Liverpool. Whilst escorting convoy OS.45, on 2 April, La Malouine picked up some of the 53 survivors from the torpedoed merchant vessel Katha, 515 kilometers (320 mi) west of Porto. From June 1943 La Malouine returned to the Mediterranean where she escorted a further 11 convoys in addition to the six already undertaken in the first half of the year.

During 1944 La Malouine undertook escort duty on 14 convoys, covering both trans-Atlantic and Mediterranean routes. On 16 April whilst en route to Port Said La Malouine assisted in the rescue of 72 crew from the liberty ship Meyer London which had been attacked and sunk with an aerial torpedo.

Records indicate that La Malouine undertook two convoys in 1945 the last of which was from Liverpool to Gibraltar in May of that year.

== Postwar ==
La Malouine returned to the UK and was decommissioned, eventually being scrapped at Gelliswick Bay, Milford Haven on 22 May 1947.
