= Reed bed =

Habitats formed by reed colonies in floodplains and estuaries

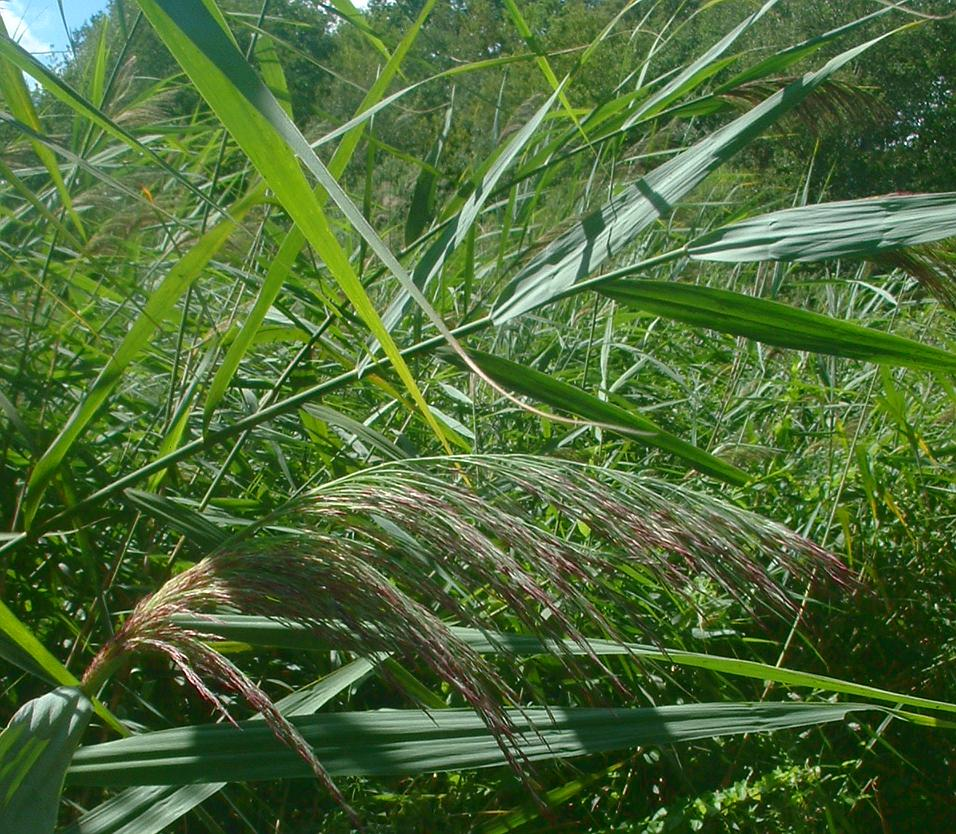
A reedbed in summer

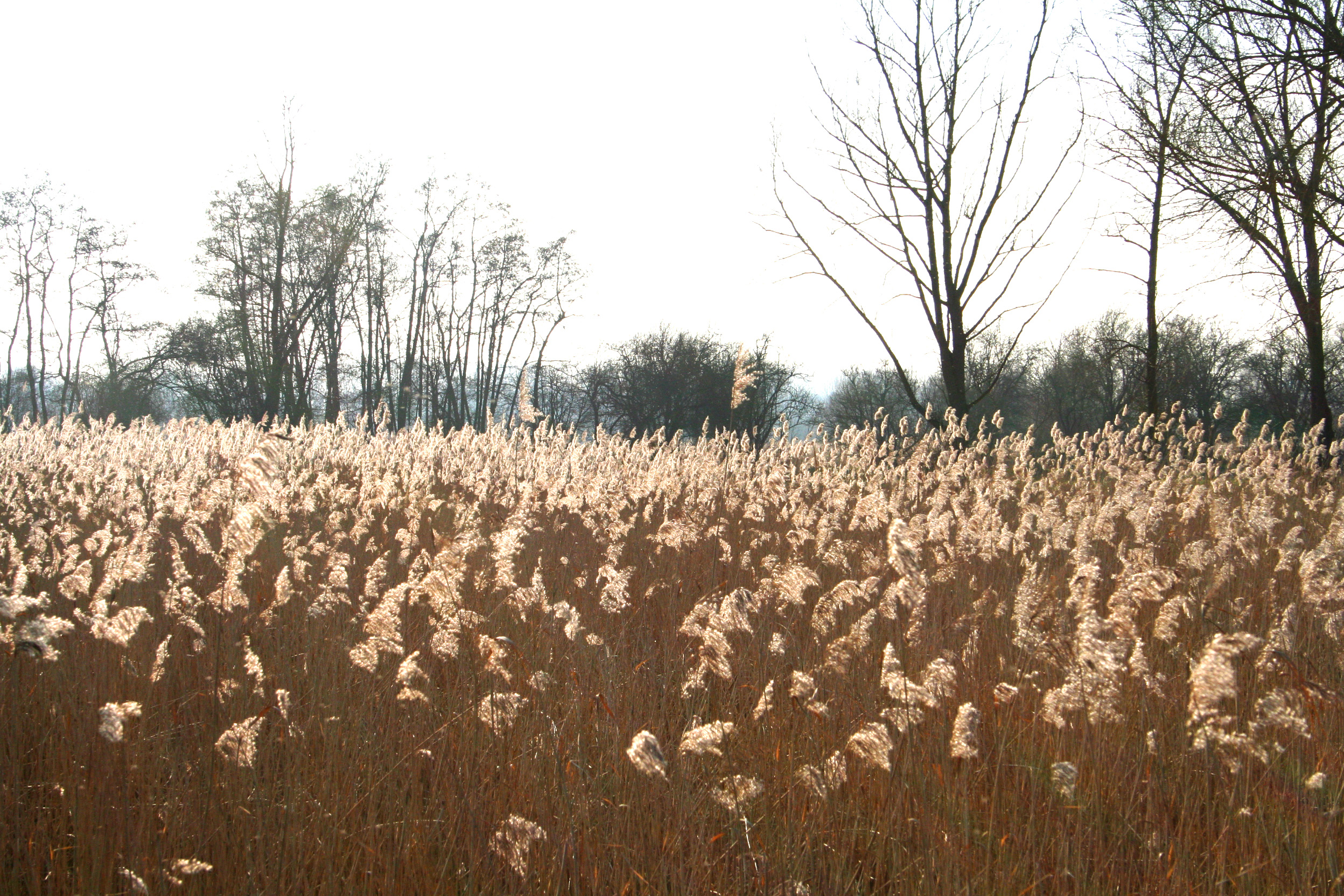
Reedbed in winter

A reedbed or reed bed is a natural habitat found in floodplains, waterlogged depressions and estuaries. Reedbeds are part of a succession from young reeds colonising open water or wet ground through a gradation of increasingly dry ground. As reedbeds age, they build up a considerable litter layer that eventually rises above the water level and that ultimately provides opportunities in the form of new areas for larger terrestrial plants such as shrubs and trees to colonise.

Artificial reedbeds are used to remove pollutants from greywater, and are also called constructed wetlands.

== Types ==
Reedbeds vary in the species that they can support, depending upon water levels within the wetland system, climate, seasonal variations, and the nutrient status and salinity of the water. Reed swamps have 20 cm or more of surface water during the summer and often have high invertebrate and bird species use. Reed fens have water levels at or below the surface during the summer and are often more botanically complex. Reeds and similar plants do not generally grow in very acidic water. In these situations, reedbeds are replaced by bogs and vegetation such as poor fen.

Although common reeds are characteristic of reedbeds, not all vegetation dominated by this species is characteristic of reedbeds. It also commonly occurs in unmanaged, damp grassland and as an understorey in certain types of damp woodland.

== Wildlife ==
A previously sandy shore colonised by reeds forming a reedbed.

Most European reedbeds mainly comprise common reed (Phragmites australis) but also include many other tall monocotyledons adapted to growing in wet conditions – other grasses such as reed sweet-grass (Glyceria maxima), Canary reed-grass (Phalaris arundinacea) and small-reed (Calamagrostis species), large sedges (species of Carex, Scirpus, Schoenoplectus, Cladium and related genera), yellow flag iris (Iris pseudacorus), reed-mace ("bulrush" – Typha species), water-plantains (Alisma species), and flowering rush (Butomus umbellatus). Many dicotyledons also occur, such as water mint (Mentha aquatica), gipsywort (Lycopus europaeus), skull-cap (Scutellaria species), touch-me-not balsam (Impatiens noli-tangere), brooklime (Veronica beccabunga) and water forget-me-nots (Myosotis species).

Many animals are adapted to living in and around reedbeds. These include mammals such as Eurasian otter, European beaver, water vole, Eurasian harvest mouse and water shrew, and birds such as great bittern, purple heron, European spoonbill, water rail (and other rails), purple gallinule, marsh harrier, various warblers (reed warbler, sedge warbler etc.), bearded reedling and reed bunting.

== Uses ==
=== Constructed wetlands ===
Constructed wetlands are artificial swamps (sometimes called reed fields) using reed or other marshland plants to form part of small-scale sewage treatment systems. Water trickling through the reedbed is cleaned by microorganisms living on the root system and in the litter. These organisms utilize the sewage for growth nutrients, resulting in a clean effluent. The process is very similar to aerobic conventional sewage treatment, as the same organisms are used, except that conventional treatment systems require artificial aeration.

=== Treatment ponds ===
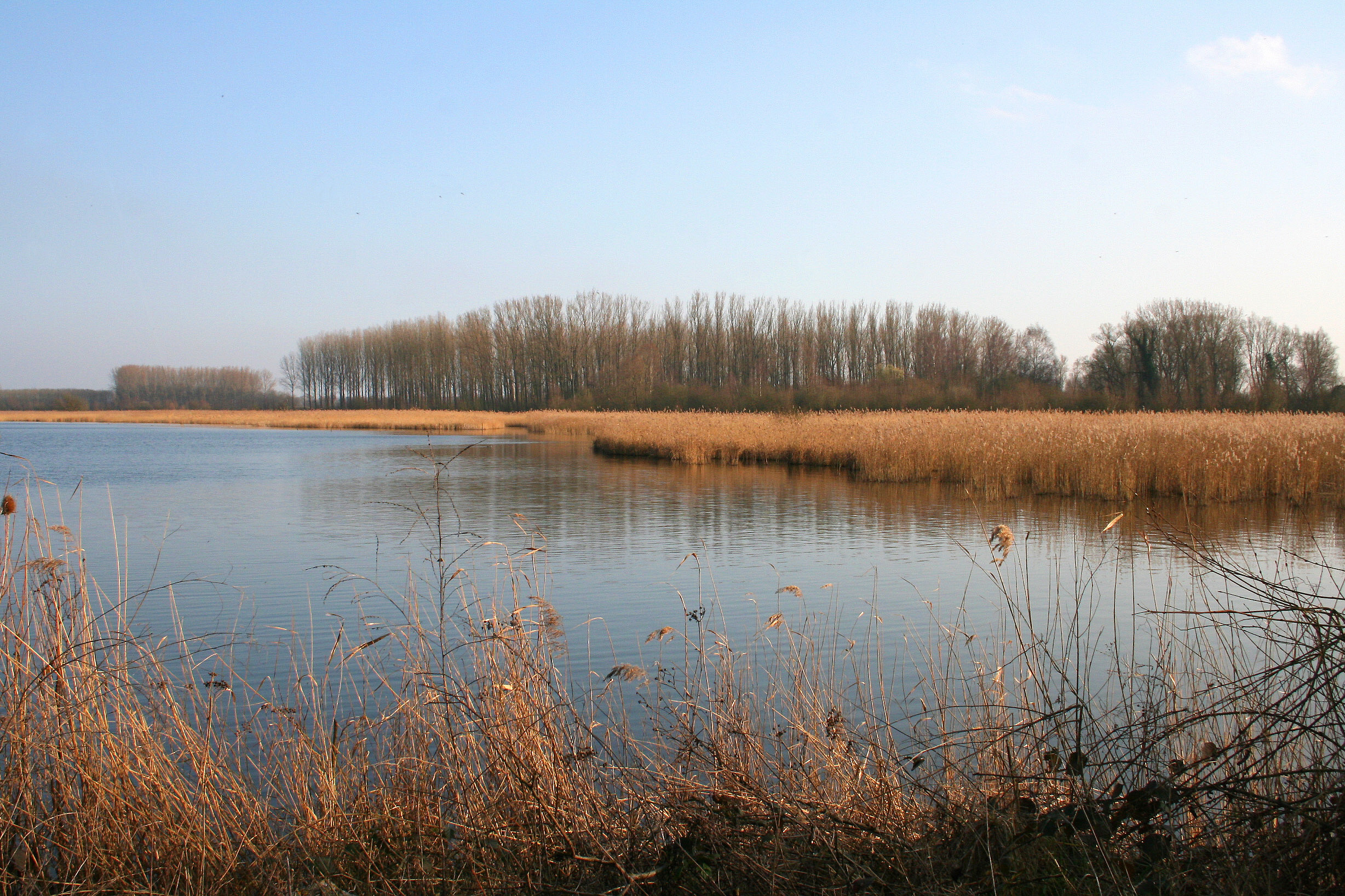
Reedbed of Harchies ponds (Belgium)

Treatment ponds are small versions of constructed wetlands which uses reedbeds or other marshland plants to form an even smaller water treatment system. Similar to constructed wetlands, water trickling through the reedbed is cleaned by microorganisms living on the root system and in the litter. Treatment ponds are used for the water treatment of a single house or a small neighbourhood.

== Gallery ==
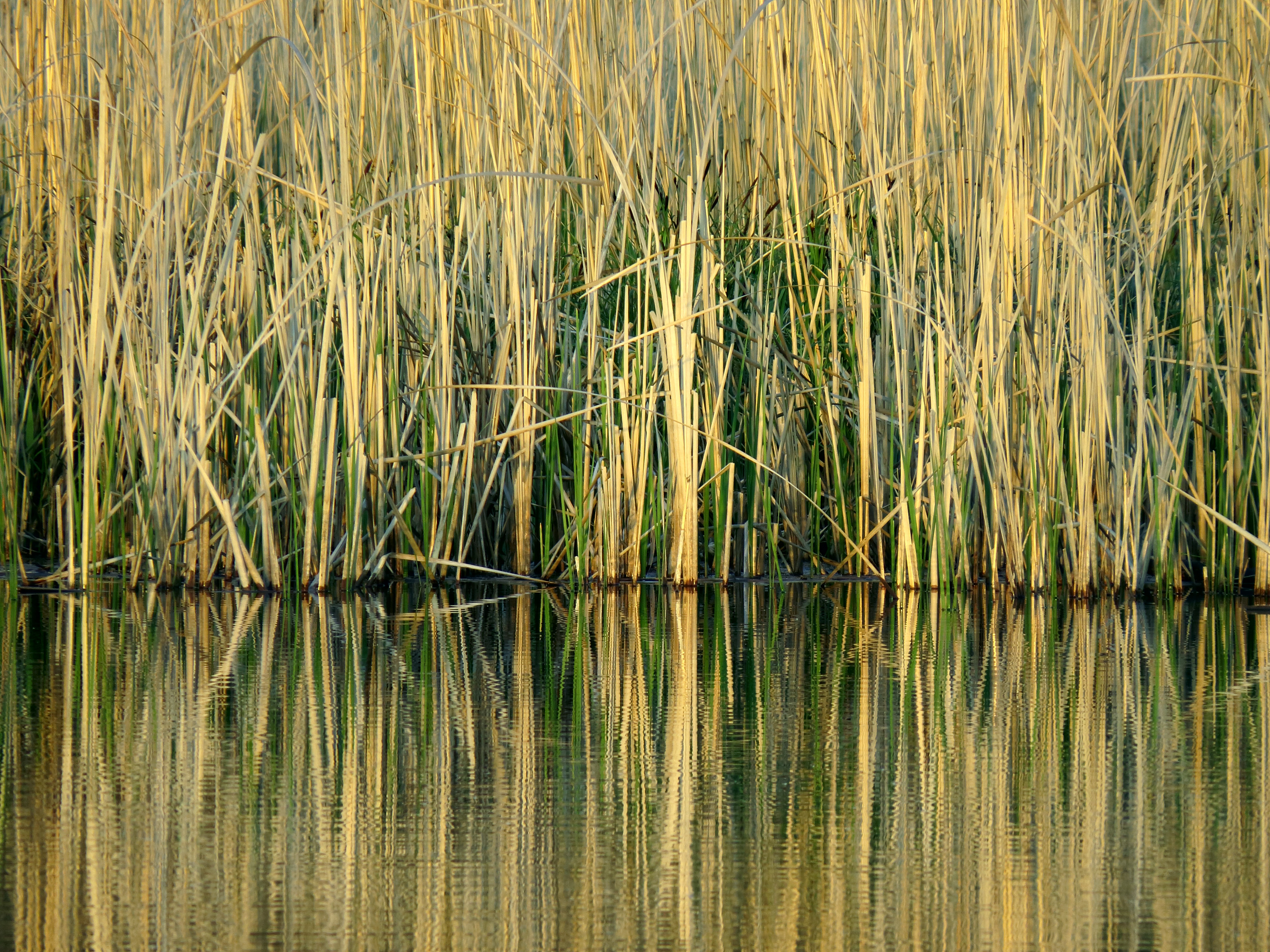
Reedbed of Phragmites australis and Carex acutiformis

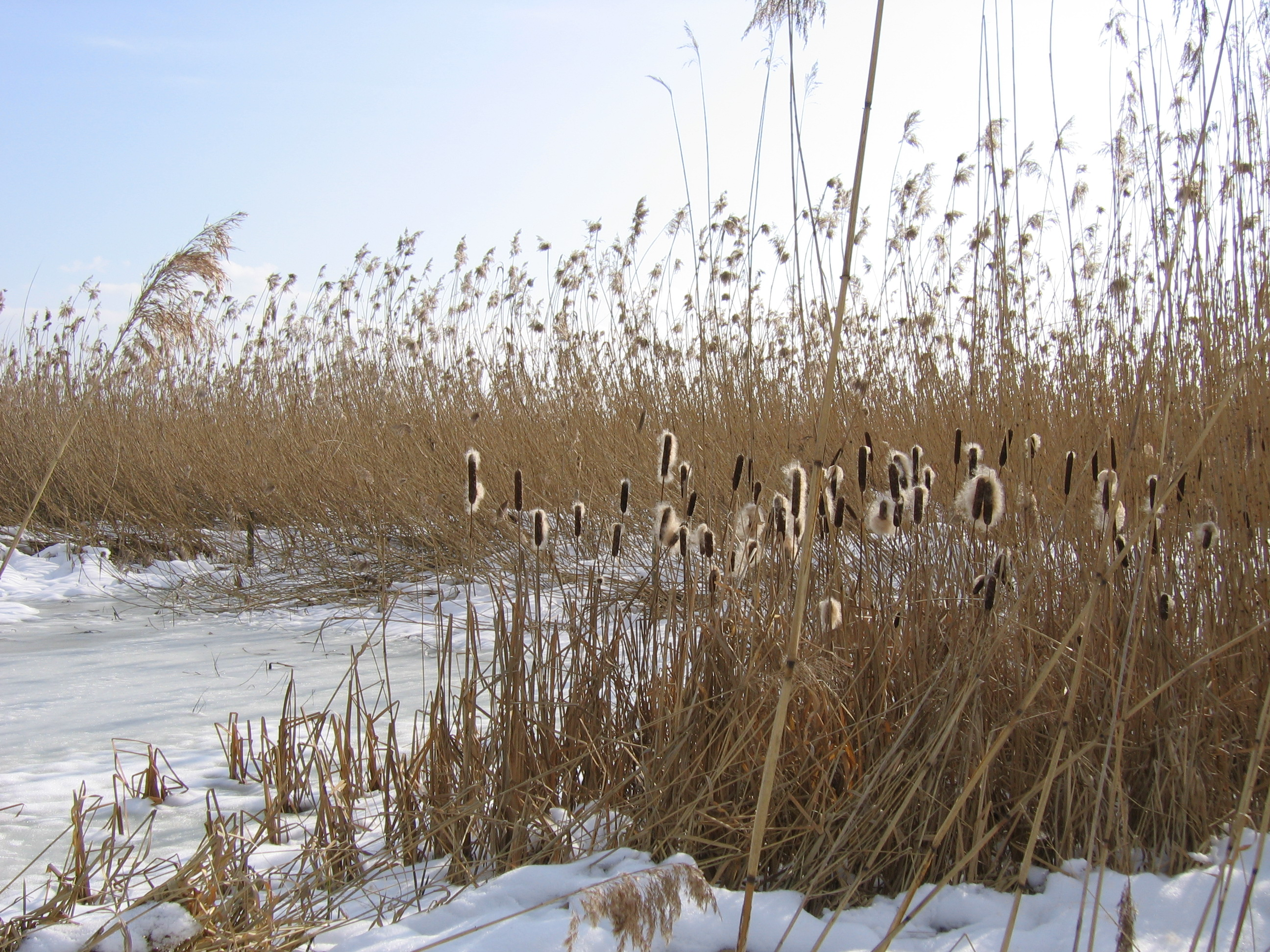
Reedbed of Phragmites australis and Typha latifolia

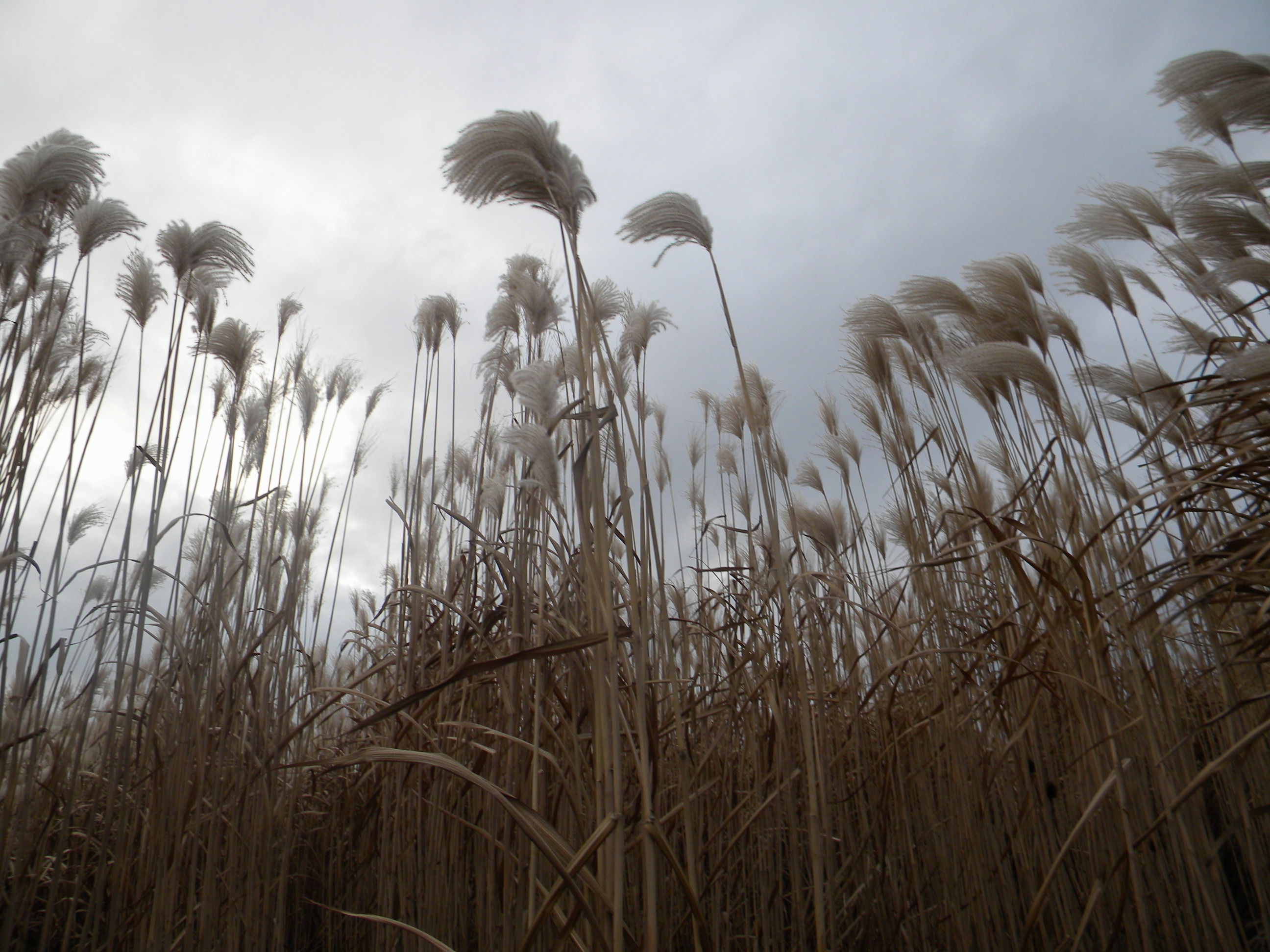
Reedbed of Miscanthus

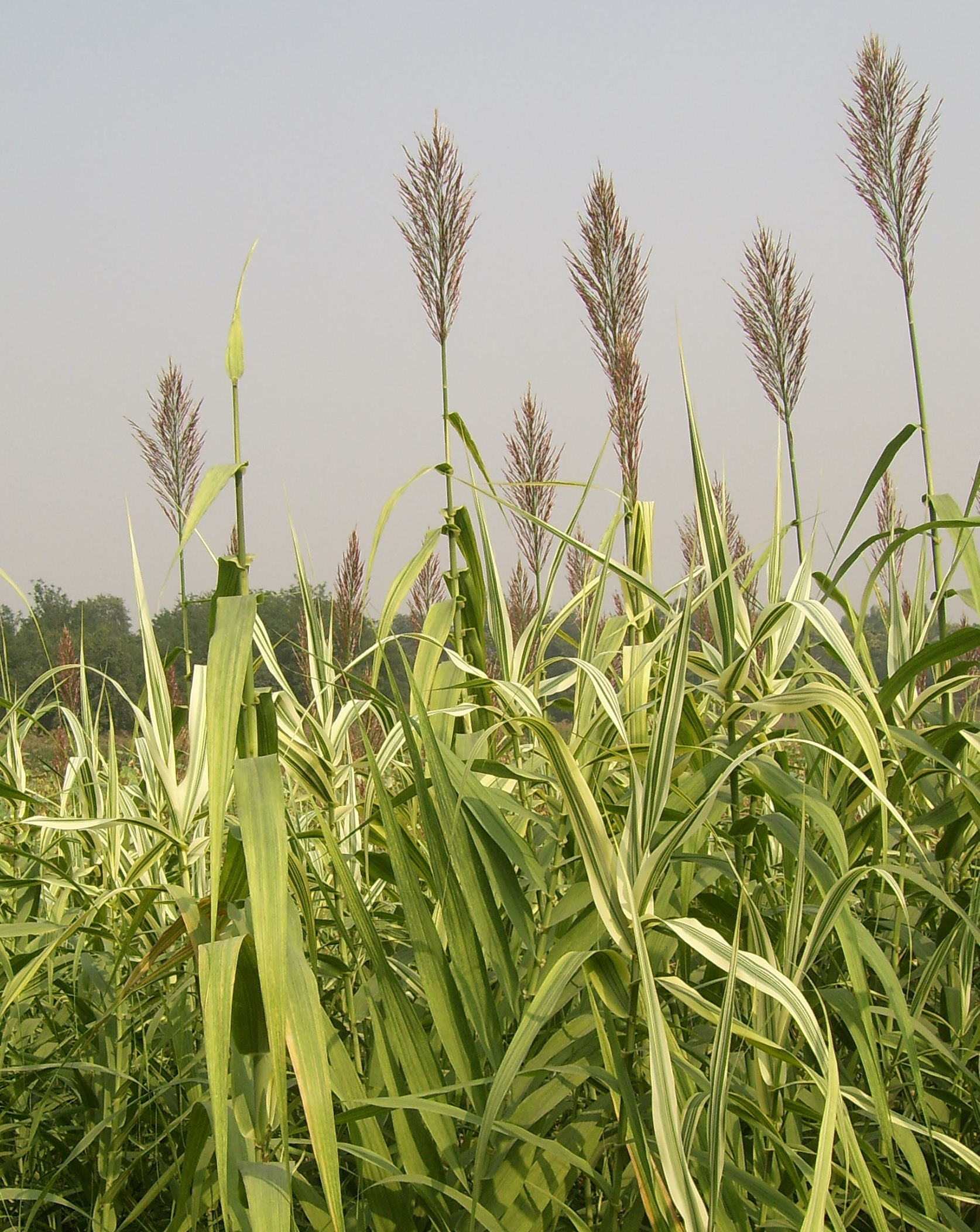
Reedbed of Arundo donax

== See also ==
- Organisms used in water purification
- South Milton Ley
