= MV Tajandoen =

Dutch cargo liner sunk by a U-boat in 1939

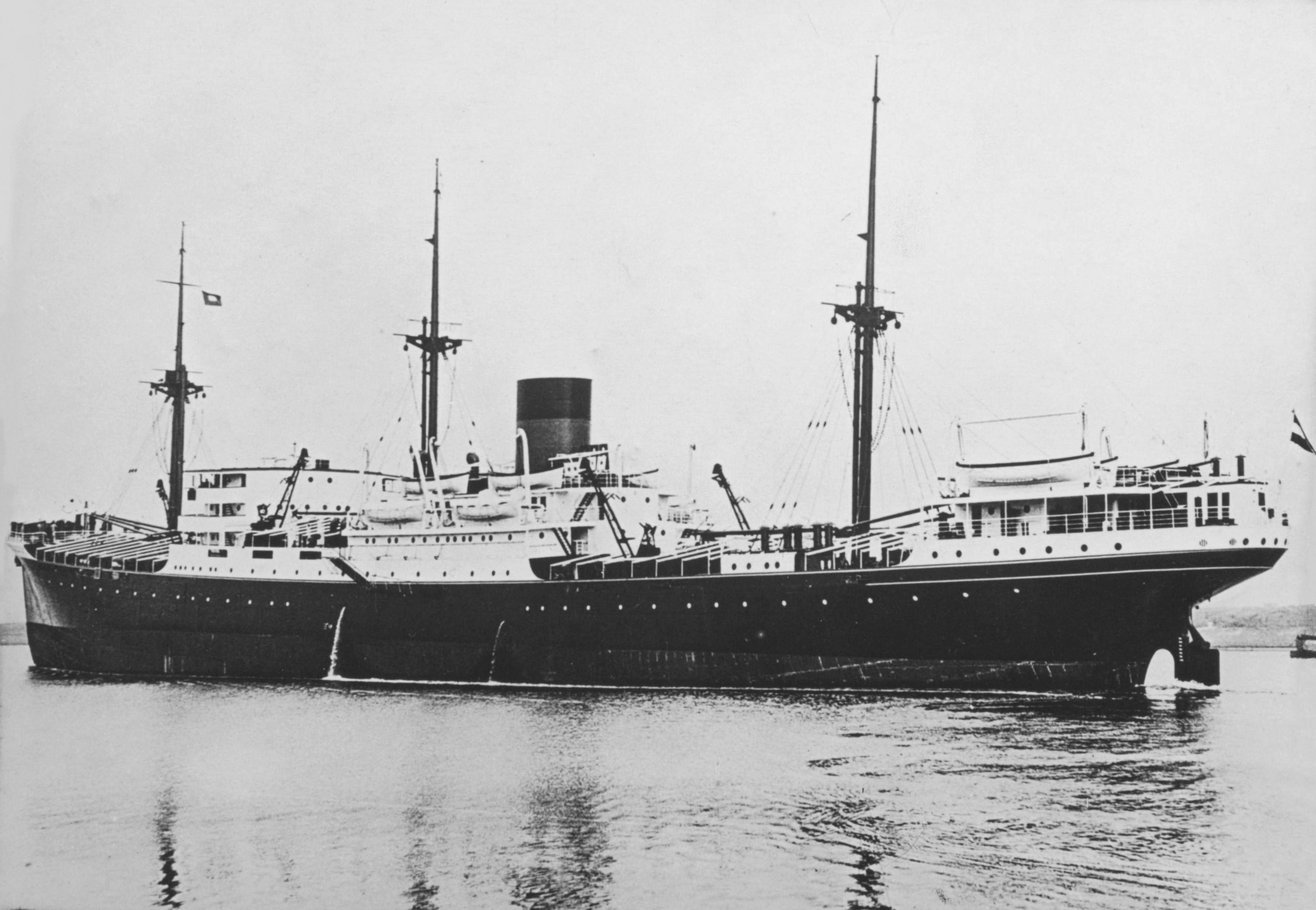
- Tajandoen in 1938

History

Netherlands
- Name: Tajandoen
- Owner: Netherland Line
- Port of registry: Amsterdam
- Builder: Ned Scheepsbouw Mij, Amsterdam
- Yard number: 207
- Launched: 2 May 1931
- Completed: October 1931
- Identification: until 1933: code letters PTHS; by 1934: call sign PHWG
- Fate: sunk by torpedo, 7 December 1939

General characteristics
- Class & type: T-class cargo liner
- Tonnage: 8,159 GRT, 4,894 NRT, 10,568 DWT
- Length: 469.0 ft (143.0 m) registered
- Beam: 62.2 ft (19.0 m)
- Draught: 29 ft 0 in (8.84 m)
- Depth: 32.6 ft (9.9 m)
- Decks: 3
- Installed power: 1 × two-stroke Diesel, 2,122 NHP
- Propulsion: 1 × screw
- Speed: 15 knots (28 km/h)
- Capacity: Passengers: 19; Cargo: 610,000 cu ft (17,000 m^{3}) grain; 529,000 cu ft (15,000 m^{3}) bale
- Crew: 54
- Sensors & processing systems: by 1936: wireless direction finding

MV Tajandoen was a Netherland Line cargo liner that was built in 1931. A U-boat sank her in the English Channel in December 1939, killing six members of her crew, and violating the Netherlands' neutrality. Italian and Belgian steamships rescued 62 survivors. The Belgian ship, Louis Sheid, tried to take the survivors to safety in England, but ran aground in a high wind, heavy sea, and driving rain. An RNLI lifeboat rescued Tajandoen's survivors from Louis Sheid. The next morning, Louis Sheid's crew were rescued by Breeches buoy to the shore.

== A class of seven sisters ==
In 1930 and 1931, shipyards in the Netherlands and in Scotland built a class of seven motor ships for Stoomvaart Maatschappij Nederland (the "Netherlands Steam Navigation Company", or SMN). Each ship was just over 8,000 GRT, and had berths for 19 or 21 passengers.

The Caledon Shipbuilding & Engineering Company in Dundee launched the first member of the class, Talisse, in February 1930. Caledon also built Tanimbar, launching her that May. Nederlandsche Scheepsbouw Maatschappij in Amsterdam built four members of the class: Tabinta, launched in March 1930; Tabian, launched that May; Tawali, launched that July; and finally Tajindoen, launched in May 1931. Maatschappij voor Scheeps- en Werktuigbouw Fijenoord built one member of the class, Tarakan, which was launched in July 1930.

== Tajandoen ==
Tajandoen was the last member of the class to be built. Nederlandsche Scheepsbouw Maatschappij built her as yard number 207, launched her on 2 May 1931, and her completed that October. Her registered length was 469.0 ft (143.0 m), her beam was 62.2 ft (19.0 m), her depth was 32.6 ft (9.9 m), and her draught was 29 ft 0 in (8.84 m). Her tonnages were 8,159 GRT, 4,894 NRT, and 10,568 DWT. Her holds had capacity for 610,000 cu ft (17,000 m^{3}) of grain, or 529,000 cu ft (15,000 m^{3}) of cargo in bales, and she had berths for 19 passengers.

The ship had a single screw, driven by a Sulzer eight-cylinder, double-acting, two-stroke Diesel engine. It was rated at 2,122 NHP, and gave her a speed of 15 knots (28 km/h).

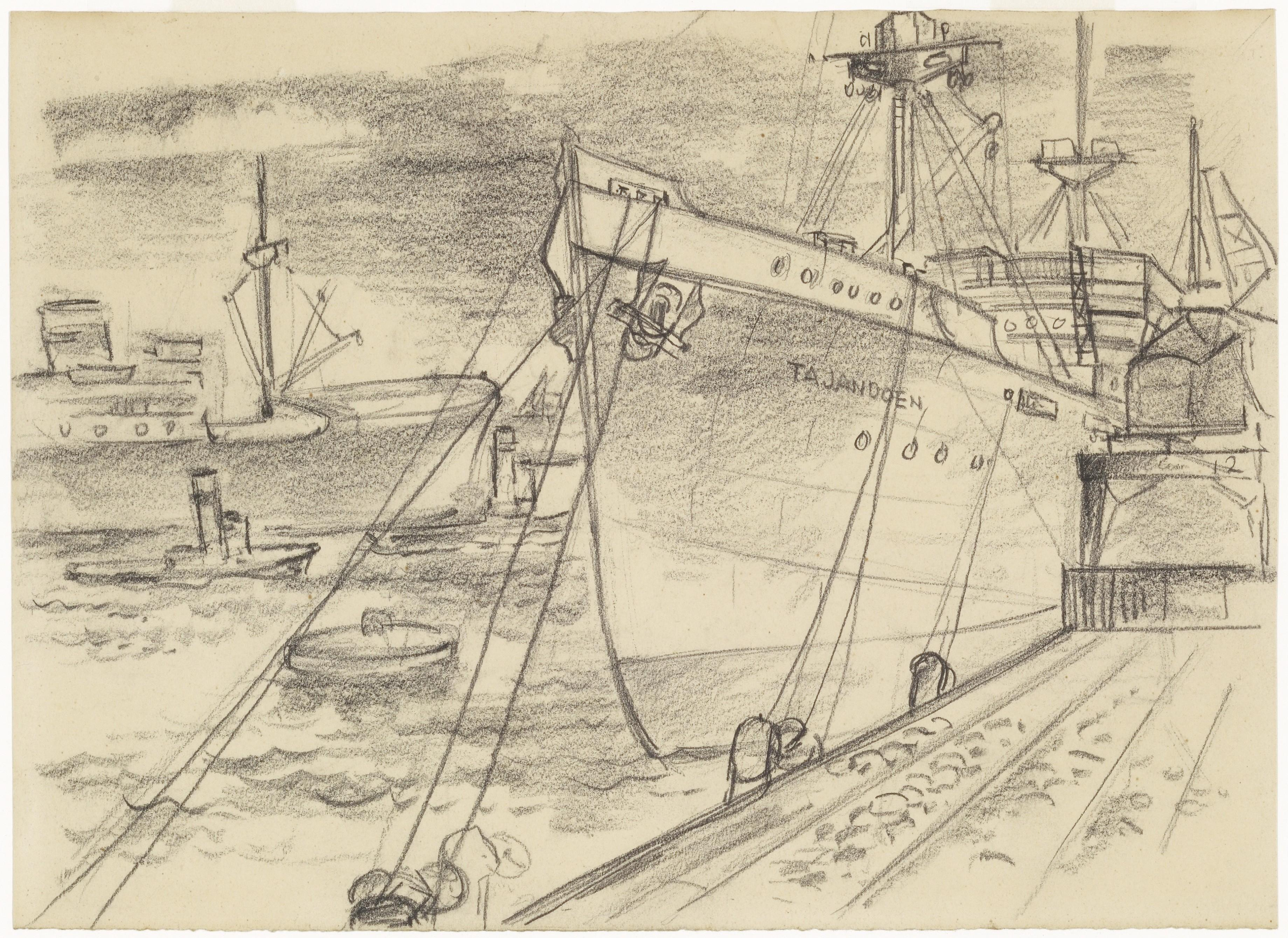
A sketch of Tajandoen in an unidentified port

SMN registered Tajandoen at Amsterdam. Her code letters were PTHS. By 1934, her wireless telegraph call sign was PHWG, and this had superseded her code letters. By 1936, she was equipped with wireless direction finding.

== Boccaccio ==
On 18 November 1937, Tajandoen rescued the crew of an Italian cargo ship. A bomb planted by Ernst Wollweber's anti-fascist saboteurs sank the steamship Boccaccio at 48°12′N 05°15′W, west of Finistère. She was reported to be carrying arms and ammunition to supply the Nationalist faction in the Spanish Civil War, in violation of the international non-intervention agreement. One crew member was killed, but Tajandoen rescued 31 survivors.

== Loss ==
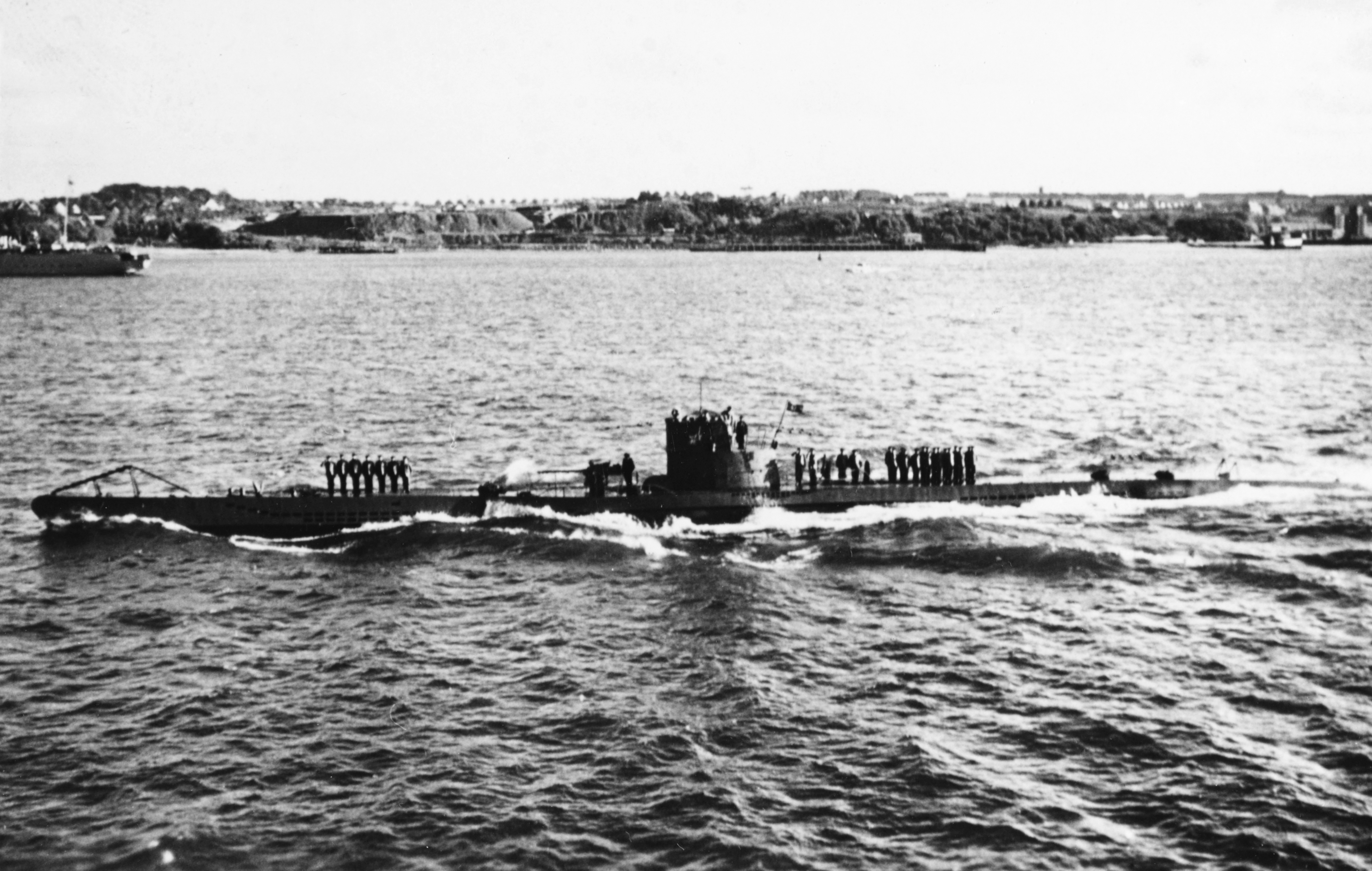
The German submarine U-47

On 29 November 1939, Tajandoen left Amsterdam for Batavia, Dutch East Indies. She called at Antwerp, and then continued west down the English Channel. Her Master was Captain J Bernard Roederink. Her crew had 54 members, many of whom were Javanese ratings. She carried 14 passengers; including five women; and two children, aged five and 12. Her cargo was mixed, including cement, iron, steel, and glass.

Before dawn on 7 December, U-47 sighted Tajandoen in the western part of the English Channel. In the dark, the U-boat commander, Günther Prien, misidentified the large cargo liner as a tanker. Only four minutes later, at 05:24 hrs, U-47 hit Tajandoen with a single torpedo. The explosion blew open her starboard side amidships, flooded her engine room, and set her heavy fuel oil on fire. Survivors reported that she sank within 15 minutes. Her position was 49°09′N 4°51′W: north of Île Vierge in Brittany, and south of The Lizard in Cornwall.

Tajandoen's passengers, and many of her crew, had been asleep in their bunks. Many went to boat stations barefoot, and some in their night clothes. Her surviving crew launched her lifeboats, and 62 survivors got away from the ship. As Tajandoen sank, she broke in two, spilling 800 tons of burning fuel oil onto the surface of the sea. Two seamen who had jumped overboard suffered serious burns, before one of the lifeboats rescued them. The Chief Officer said "We had to row like Hell" to get the lifeboats away from the burning oil.

Six members of Tajandoen's company were killed, including three in her engine room. They were her second engineer, one of her fourth engineers, an able seaman, two ordinary seamen, and a sailor. Captain Roederink and his chief engineer were unsure uncertain whether it was a torpedo or a mine that had sunk their ship. Tajandoen's chief officer, however, was sure it was a torpedo.

== Rescue ==
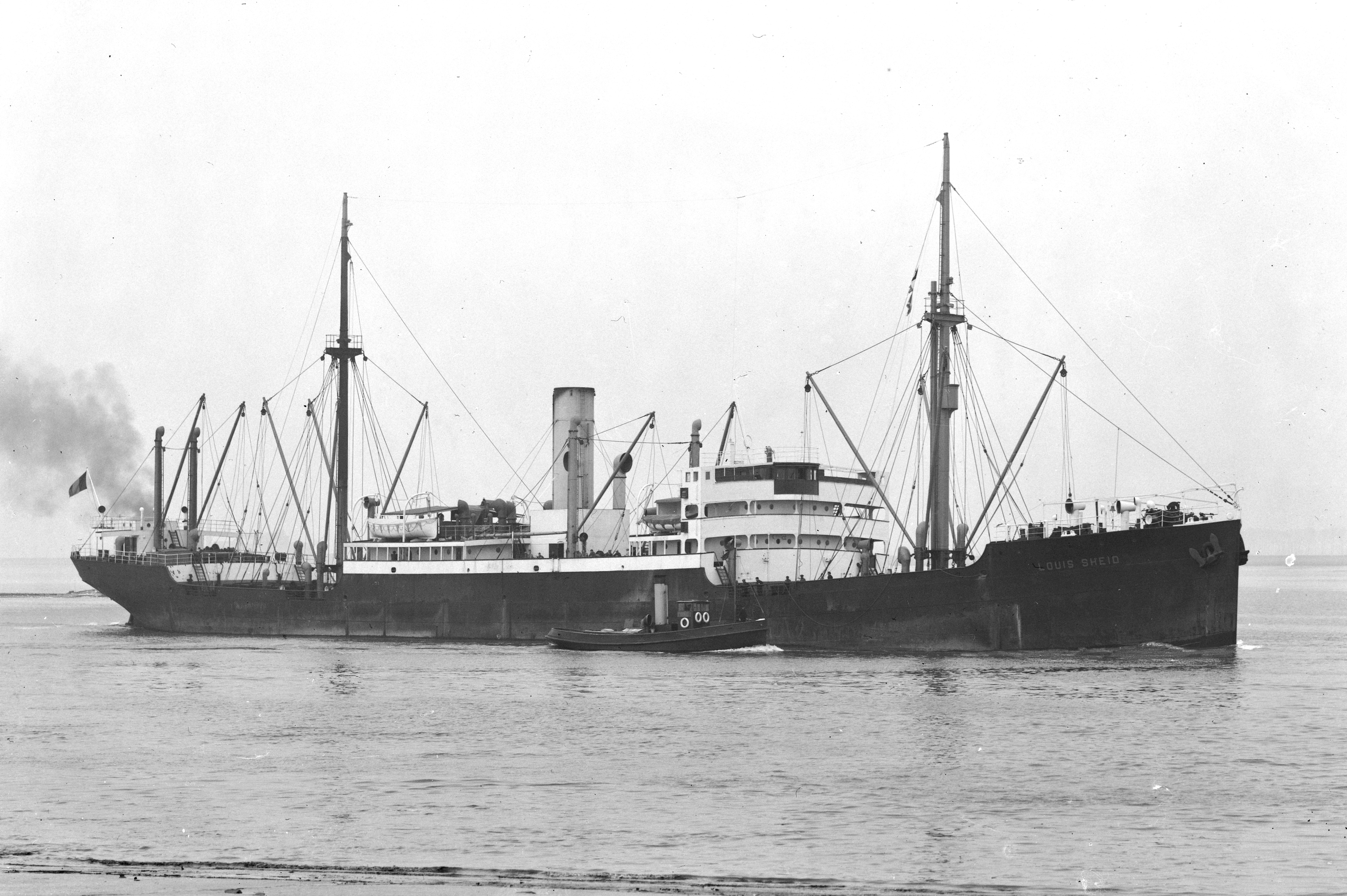
The Belgian steamship Louis Sheid

A Belgian cargo steamship, Louis Sheid, was about 7 to 8 nautical miles (13 to 15 km) away. One of her able seamen, who was on the morning watch, saw a bright flash, but it was too distant for him to see what caused it. About ten minutes later, Louis Sheid's chief officer and third officer identified "flames... rising from the surface of the water as well as from the vessel, which was then ablaze". They told Louis Sheid's Master, Captain E van Queckelberghe, who ordered a change of course toward the flames.

After about two and a half or three hours, Louis Sheid reached the scene of the wreck and found a lifeboat. It was commanded by Tajandoen's chief officer, and carried 22 members of her crew. Louis Sheid rescued them, and transmitted a wireless telegraph signal to warn ships in the area what had happened to Tajandoen. She then found a second lifeboat, which carried another six people.

An Italian cargo steamship, Giorgio Ohlsen, also arrived. She found a third lifeboat, which was carrying 28 members of Tajandoen's crew, and six of her passengers. Giorgio Ohlsen was bound for Lisbon, which was at least three days' voyage away, whereas Louis Sheid was homeward bound to Antwerp. The Italian ship transferred her 34 survivors to Louis Sheid, in order for them to be put ashore sooner. The Belgian ship remained in the area until about 11:00 hrs, searching for the six men missing from Tajandoen.

== Louis Sheid ==
Louis Sheid then headed for England. She neared the coast in a strong southwest wind, heavy sea, and driving rain. The Moon was a waning crescent, only two days before a new Moon, so there was almost no moonlight. Britain was under blackout regulations, so there were no lights ashore, apart from lighthouses and other official navigation lights. Early in the evening of 7 December, Louis Sheid entered Bigbury Bay in South Devon, about 13 nautical miles (24 km) southeast of Plymouth. One report states that visibility from the ship was only about 20 yards (18 m). However, the same report states that people ashore saw the ship, saw she was in danger, and alerted the local HM Coastguard station to warn her.

At about 19:20 hrs local time, Louis Sheid struck a sandbank near the shore. She tried to free herself, running her engine ahead, and then astern, but without success. The heavy sea then drove her onto Books Rocks at Thurlestone, which is inshore just below what was then the Links Hotel (now Links Court apartments). Her wireless operator transmitted an SOS signal, and Captain van Queckelberghe fired rockets in a distress signal.

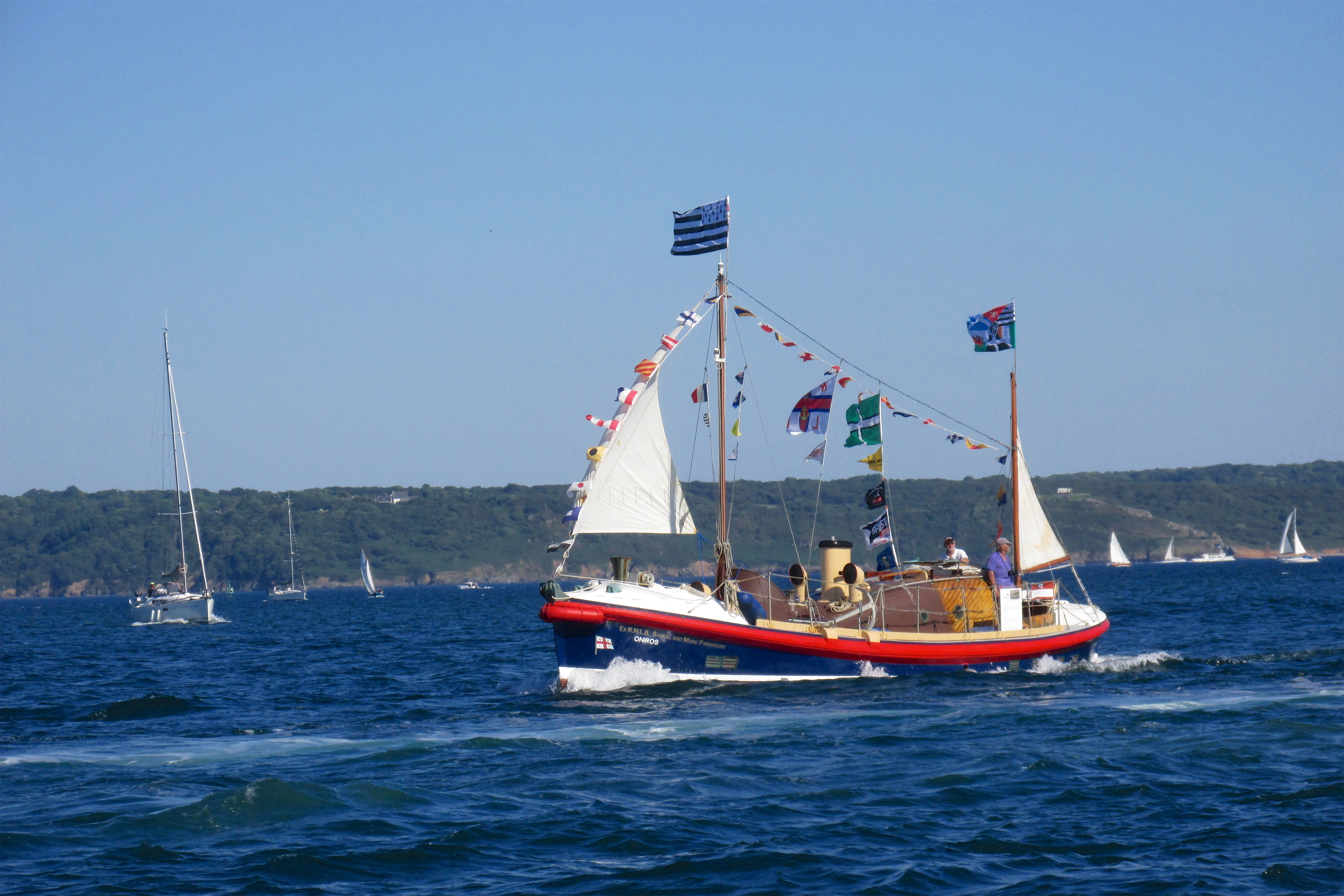
The former Salcombe lifeboat Samuel and Marie Parkhouse, which is now the pleasure boat Oniros. She rescued Tajandoen's 62 survivors from Louis Sheid.

At 19:35 hrs, a retired lifeboatman living in Hope Cove alerted Edward Distin, the coxswain of Salcombe Lifeboat Station. The lifeboat, Samuel and Marie Parkhouse, was launched at 19:45 hrs, and reached Louis Sheid at 21:20 hrs. The lifeboat came along the steamship's port side, rescued 40 of Tajandoen's survivors, and took them to Hope Cove. There the survivors were transferred to local fishing boats, which took them ashore. The lifeboat returned to Louis Sheid, rescued the remaining 22 of Tajandoen's survivors, and took them to Hope Cove to be transferred ashore. The injured were taken by ambulance 30 miles (48 km) to hospital, and the remainder were cared for at the Cottage Hotel.

The lifeboat then returned to the steamship, but Louis Sheid's crew planned to remain aboard overnight, to try to save and refloat their ship. The lifeboat therefore stood by until the morning of 8 December. Louis Sheid failed to free herself, so Captain van Queckelberghe decided to order his crew to abandon ship. A rescue party ashore fired a rocket and line to the ship, by which a Breeches buoy was set up between the ship and the shore, a distance of about 600 yards (550 m). Transferring the crew from ship to shore began soon after 04:00 hrs, and was completed soon after 10:00 hrs. All of Louis Sheid's crew survived, and were helped up a steep cliff path to the Links Hotel. The lifeboat stood by until 08:00 hrs. She reached her moorings at 10:30 hrs, and was brought ashore at 11:00 hrs. Her crew of eight men had been on duty continuously for 18 1/2 hours.

== Aftermath ==
Tajandoen was the eighth Dutch ship sunk since the war began in September 1939, and the second sunk by a U-boat. Earlier victims included the tanker Sliedrecht, which a U-boat had torpedoed on 16 November. Germany warned that unless the Netherlands ceased transporting goods to Britain, "the German Government would not consider her truly neutral", and claimed that "True neutrality... involved declining to ship anything to Britain."

== Bibliography ==
- Anonymous. The Wreck of the Louis Sheid 1939 (PDF). Salcombe: Salcombe Maritime Museum. – includes several news photographs of the rescue from Louis Sheid.
- Lloyd's Register of Shipping (PDF). Vol. II.–Steamers and Motorships of 300 tons gross and over. London: Lloyd's Register of Shipping. 1933 – via Southampton City Council.
- Lloyd's Register of Shipping (PDF). Vol. II.–Steamers and Motorships of 300 tons gross and over. London: Lloyd's Register of Shipping. 1934 – via Southampton City Council.
- Lloyd's Register of Shipping (PDF). Vol. II.–Steamers and Motorships of 300 tons gross and over. London: Lloyd's Register of Shipping. 1936 – via Southampton City Council.
