= Thurlestone =

Village in Devon, England

Coordinates: 50.27°N 3.86°W

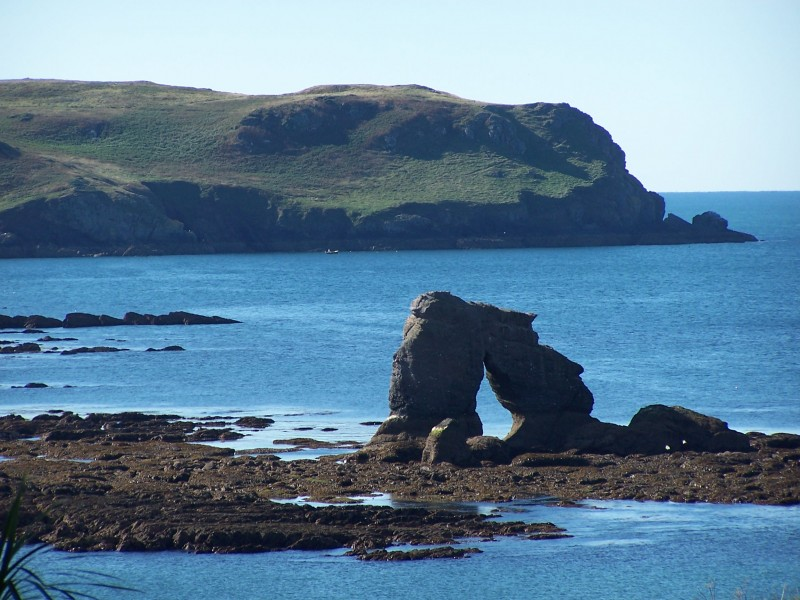
- Thurlestone Rock, from which the village takes its name.

- Location within Devon
  - London: 183 miles (295 km) NEE
- Civil parish: Thurlestone
- Shire county: Devon
- Region: South West
- Country: England
- Sovereign state: United Kingdom
- Post town: KINGSBRIDGE
- Postcode district: TQ
- Police: Devon and Cornwall
- Fire: Devon and Somerset
- Ambulance: South Western
- UK Parliament: Totnes

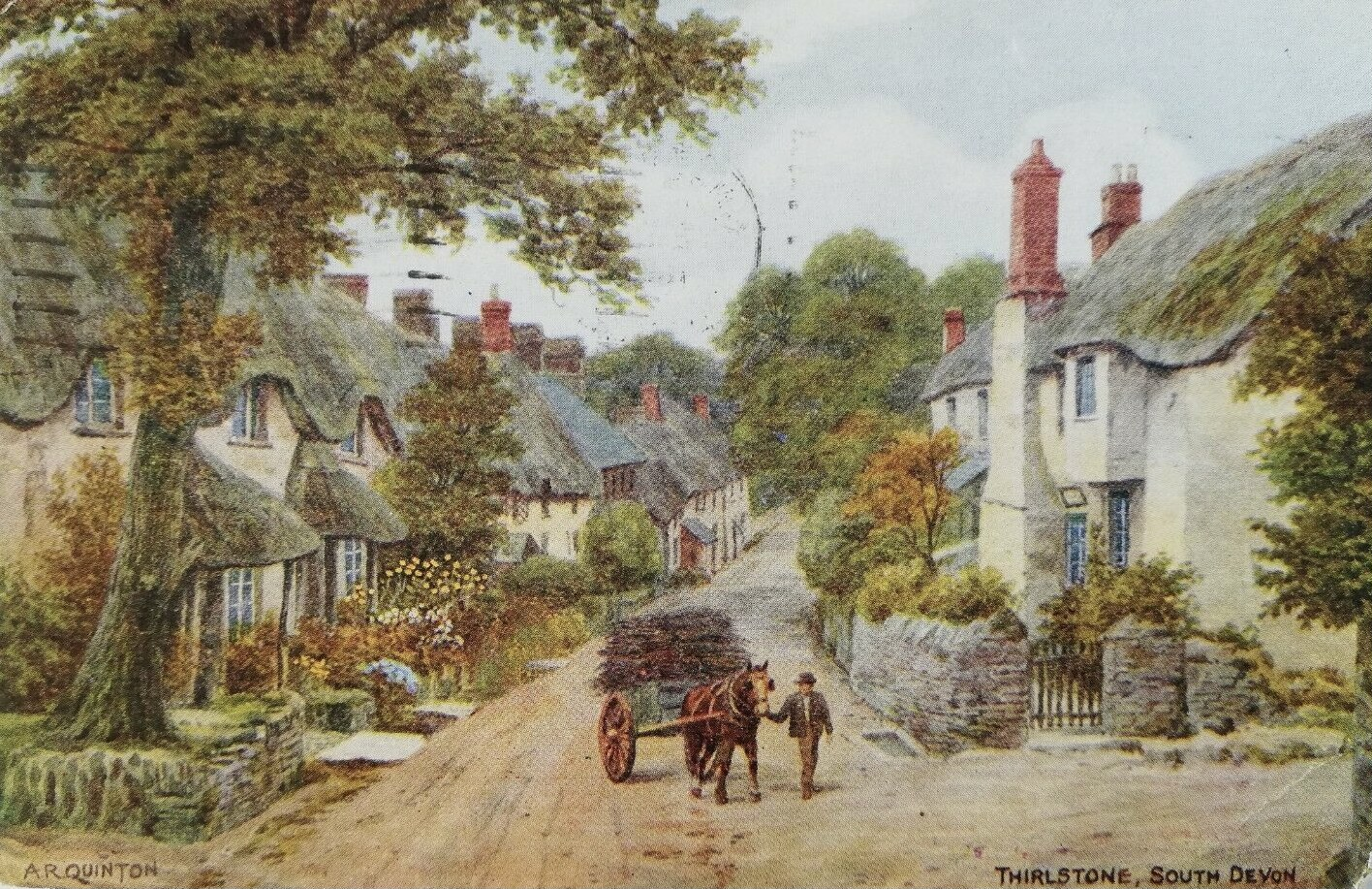
Thurlestone by A. R. Quinton, c. 1920

Thurlestone is a village and civil parish in the South Hams district in south Devon, England. The village is about 5 miles (8 km) west of Kingsbridge. There is an electoral ward in the same name. The population at the 2011 Census was 1,886.

The village is named after Thurlestone Rock, the so-called "thirled stone", an arch-shaped rock formation just offshore in Thurlestone Bay. Thurl, or Thirl is an Old English word meaning "hole".

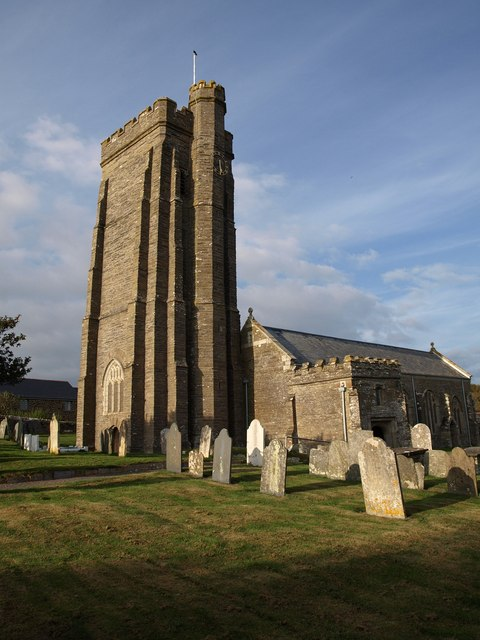
The Church of England parish church of All Saints

The Church of England parish church of All Saints is built of the dark grey local slate. The chancel was built early in the 13th century; the remainder of the church in the 15th and 16th centuries.

== Thurlestone Marsh ==
Thurlestone Marsh (grid reference SX675423) is one of three small wetlands south of the village (South Milton Ley and South Huish Marsh are the others). It is formed where a small unnamed stream flows through low-lying flat farmland just inland from Leas Foot Sand, a small beach just to the southwest of the village.

The site consists of a number of reed-fringed pools.

== Louis Sheid ==
In December 1939 a Belgian steamship, Louis Sheid, was wrecked on Books Rocks, below what was then the Links Hotel. A few hours earlier, she had rescued survivors from a Dutch ship, Tajandoen, which a U-boat had torpedoed. The RNLI lifeboat from Salcombe Lifeboat Station rescued the Dutch survivors, and a Breeches buoy was used to bring the Belgian crew ashore.

Much of Louis Sheid's wreck was dismantled during and after the Second World War, but her double bottom remains. It is now an inshore recreational dive site, and at extreme low tides the wreck is visible above water.

== Tourism ==
The village has self-catering houses and an hotel. About 60% of houses in the village are rented out at some time in the year.

== Wildlife ==
In 2002, a 30-year-old female pygmy sperm whale was washed up on Thurlestone Beach.

2005 saw two significant ornithological events (Devon Bird Report 2005):

- In late March and early April, a flock of 68 garganey was offshore in the bay – the second largest flock ever to be recorded in Britain (the largest was a flock of 120 in Kent in the 1950s).
- In August, a least sandpiper, a North American vagrant shorebird only recorded once in Devon previously, was present on Thurlestone Marsh.

== Walks ==
There is a walk from the main village to Bantham and another walk to Salcombe going through Hope Cove and Bolberry. Both of these are along the headland. There are also a numerous walks to nearby beaches and villages.
