= Bantham Coronation Boathouse =

Historic building in Devon, England

Coronation Boathouse
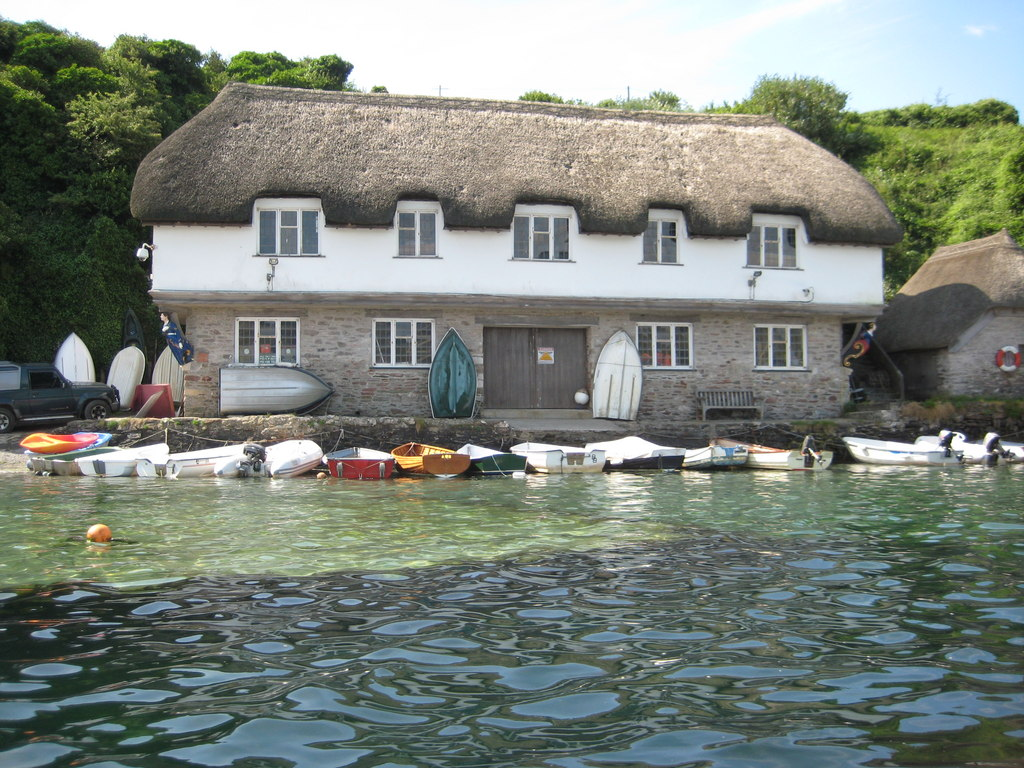
- The boathouse in 2011

- Location within Devon
- 50.2788°N 3.8708°W
- Type: Boathouse
- Location: Bantham, South Hams, Devon

History
- Built: 1937–1937; 89 years ago

Site notes
- Architect: Sebastian Comper
- Architectural style: Vernacular
- Governing body: Private

Listed Building – Grade II
- Official name: Coronation Boathouse and adjacent store building, Bantham Quay
- Designated: 13 August 2021
- Reference no.: 1475993

The Boathouse on Bantham Quay, Bantham, Devon was designed by Sebastian Comper for Lieutenant Commander Charles E. Evans RNVR, the owner of the Bantham Estate. It was built in 1937, to commemorate the Coronation of George VI and Elizabeth. It is a Grade II listed building.

== History ==
Dedication,
THIS BOATHOUSE WAS ERECTED BY /
LT COMDR CHARLES E EVANS RNVR /
AO DNI 1937 TO COMMEMORATE THE /
ACCESSION OF HIS MOST GRACIOUS /
MAJESTY KING GEORGE THE SIXTH. /
JBS COMPER ARCHITECT PEARN BROS. BUILDERS. /

— Historic England listing

The Bantham Estate, one of Britain's largest family-owned estates, was bought by Lieutenant Commander Charles E. Evans in 1922. The estate remained with his descendants until 2014 when it was sold to Nicholas Johnston, owner of the Great Tew estate in Oxfordshire. Johnston remained in possession until 2025 when it was purchased by Chilton Home Farms, a business operated by the Aubrey-Fletcher family.

Evans commissioned Sebastian Comper, son of the ecclesiastical architect, Ninian Comper, to design the boathouse in 1937, in commemoration of the accession and coronation of George VI and his consort, Queen Elizabeth. A dedication on the boathouse records the inspiration [see box]. The builders were the Pearn Brothers of Truro.

Evans and his descendants sought to maintain the traditional character of the village and the beach and quay on which the boathouse stands, declining either to rent out property seasonally or to allow second or holiday homes. Bridget Cherry, in her Devon volume in the Buildings of England series, revised and reissued in 2004, described Bantham as "unusually picturesque". (Note: While appreciating the charms of the village, neither Cherry nor Pevsner thought the boathouse merited mention.) The sale of the estate in 2014 saw some tension between the new owner and elements in the Bantham community, culminating in a planning application to convert the upper storey of the boathouse into a holiday rental property meeting considerable local opposition. At the time of the estate's sale in 2025, the plans had not been approved by South Hams District Council, although they had been objected to by the local parish council.

== Architecture ==
Bantham Boathouse is a two-storey structure, built of brick and steel under a timber and thatch roof. Historic England describe the architectural style as "Tudor vernacular". The boathouse is a Grade II listed building.

== Sources ==
- Cherry, Bridget; Pevsner, Nikolaus (2004). Devon. The Buildings of England. New Haven, US and London: Yale University Press. ISBN 978-0-300-09596-8.
