= Sliedrecht (tanker) =

Dutch tanker sunk by a German U-boat in 1939

History

Netherlands
- Name: Sliedrecht
- Namesake: Sliedrecht
- Owner: Stoomvaart Mij "De Maas"
- Operator: van Ommeren's Scheepvaart Bedrijf
- Port of registry: Rotterdam
- Builder: Rotterdamsche Droogdok Maatschappij
- Yard number: 92
- Laid down: 21 June 1923
- Launched: 31 May 1924
- Completed: 10 September 1924
- Refit: lengthened, 1931
- Identification: until 1933: code letters PSHL; by 1934: call sign PHOG
- Fate: sunk by torpedo, 17 November 1939

General characteristics
- Tonnage: 1925: 4,547 GRT, 2,642 NRT, 6,340 DWT; 1932: 5,133 GRT, 2,935 NRT, 7,315 DWT
- Length: 1924: 370.0 ft (112.8 m) registered; 1932: 402.1 ft (122.6 m) registered
- Beam: 53.2 ft (16.2 m)
- Depth: 27.8 ft (8.5 m)
- Decks: 2
- Installed power: 1 × four-stroke Diesel, 489 NHP
- Propulsion: 1 × screw
- Speed: 11.5 knots (21 km/h)
- Crew: 31
- Sensors & processing systems: by 1930: wireless direction finding
- Notes: sister ships: Katendrecht, Woensdrecht

Sliedrecht was a Dutch motor tanker that was built in 1924. A U-boat sank her in the North Atlantic in November 1939, violating the Netherlands' neutrality. She was the first Dutch ship to be torpedoed by a German U-boat in the Second World War. Five survivors were rescued after spending a week in an open lifeboat. Another 26 officers and men, who were in another lifeboat, were never found.

== Building and registration ==
Between 1923 and 1925, Dutch shipyards built three sister ships for van Ommeren's Scheepvaart Bedrijf ("van Ommeren's Shipping Company") of Rotterdam. Rotterdamsche Droogdok Maatschappij launched Sliedrecht in May 1924, and Katendrecht in January 1925; and Maatschappij voor Scheeps- en Werktuigbouw Fijenoord launched Woensdrecht in November 1925. Each ship was a flush deck, single screw screw motor tanker, named after a place in the Netherlands. Sliedrecht is a town in South Holland.

Rotterdamsche Droogdok built Sliedrecht as yard number 92. She was laid down on 21 June 1923, launched on 31 May 1924, and completed on 10 September 1924. Her registered length was 370.0 ft (112.8 m), her beam was 53.2 ft (16.2 m), and her depth was 27.8 ft (8.5 m). Her tonnages were 4,547 GRT, 2,642 NRT, and 6,340 DWT. Her bridge and main superstructure were amidships, and her engine room and single funnel were aft. She had a six-cylinder, single-acting, four-stroke Diesel engine, which was made by Harland & Wolff in Govan, Glasgow. It was rated at 489 NHP, and gave her a speed of 11.5 knots (21.3 km/h).

Van Ommeren's registered Sliedrecht at Rotterdam. Her code letters were PSHL.

== Changes ==
By 1930, Sliedrecht was equipped with wireless direction finding. In 1931 she returned to Rotterdamsche Droogdok, who lengthened her hull by 32.1 ft (9.78 m). This increased her registered length to 402.1 ft (122.6 m), and her tonnages to 5,133 GRT, 2,935 NRT, and 7,315 DWT. By 1934, her wireless telegraph call sign was PHOG, and this had superseded her code letters.

== Fate ==
In October 1939, Sliedrecht left Abadan, Iran carrying 4,704 tons of gas oil, 998 tons of kerosene, and 936 tons of benzene, destined for Trondheim and Svolvær in Norway. She went via the Suez Canal and the Strait of Gibraltar, and by mid-November she was in the Western Approaches. Her Master was Captain C Boer, and he commanded a crew of 30 officers and ratings.

The Netherlands was neutral, and Sliedrecht was clearly marked on either side of her hull with her name in huge capital letters, and a painting of a Dutch flag. However, at 20:30 hrs on the evening of 16 November, U-28 intercepted her about 120 nautical miles (220 km) southeast of Rockall, ordered her to heave to, and demanded to examine her papers. Sliedrecht's Chief Officer, Pieter Brons, embarked in one of her boats with the papers and four crewmen, who rowed him to the U-boat. The papers showed that the British authorities in Gibraltar had ordered Sliedrecht to call at Kirkwall in Orkney for inspection. U-28's commander, Günter Kuhnke, took this as enough pretext for him to sink her, so he gave the Dutch 30 minutes to abandon ship. He warned that if they tried to transmit any distress signal, he would sink her immediately. Due to the heavy sea, it took the four oarsmen nearly an hour to row the Chief Officer back to the ship to deliver Kuhnke's message. Captain Boer and the remaining 25 members of his crew duly abandoned ship in a second lifeboat. U-28 then fired a single torpedo, which sank Sliedrecht at position 56°00′N 11°19′W at 00:20 hrs on 17 November (German time).

By dawn, the two lifeboats had lost contact with each other. With no compass, the Chief Officer navigated his boat by the stars, aiming for the coast of Ireland. His boat was poorly stocked, with only a little bread and drinking water. He and his four crewmen were cold, despite all wearing overcoats. After a week, they used two of the coats to improvise a sail, to take advantage of a westerly wind. On the night of 22–23 November they sighted land, and in the morning they passed Barra Head Lighthouse, at the southern tip of the Outer Hebrides. They sighted a Fleetwood-registered trawler, Merisia. The five survivors were so exhausted that the trawlermen had to carry them out of their small boat. Merisia landed them at Oban in Argyll, where they were taken by ambulance to West Highland cottage hospital.

== Aftermath ==
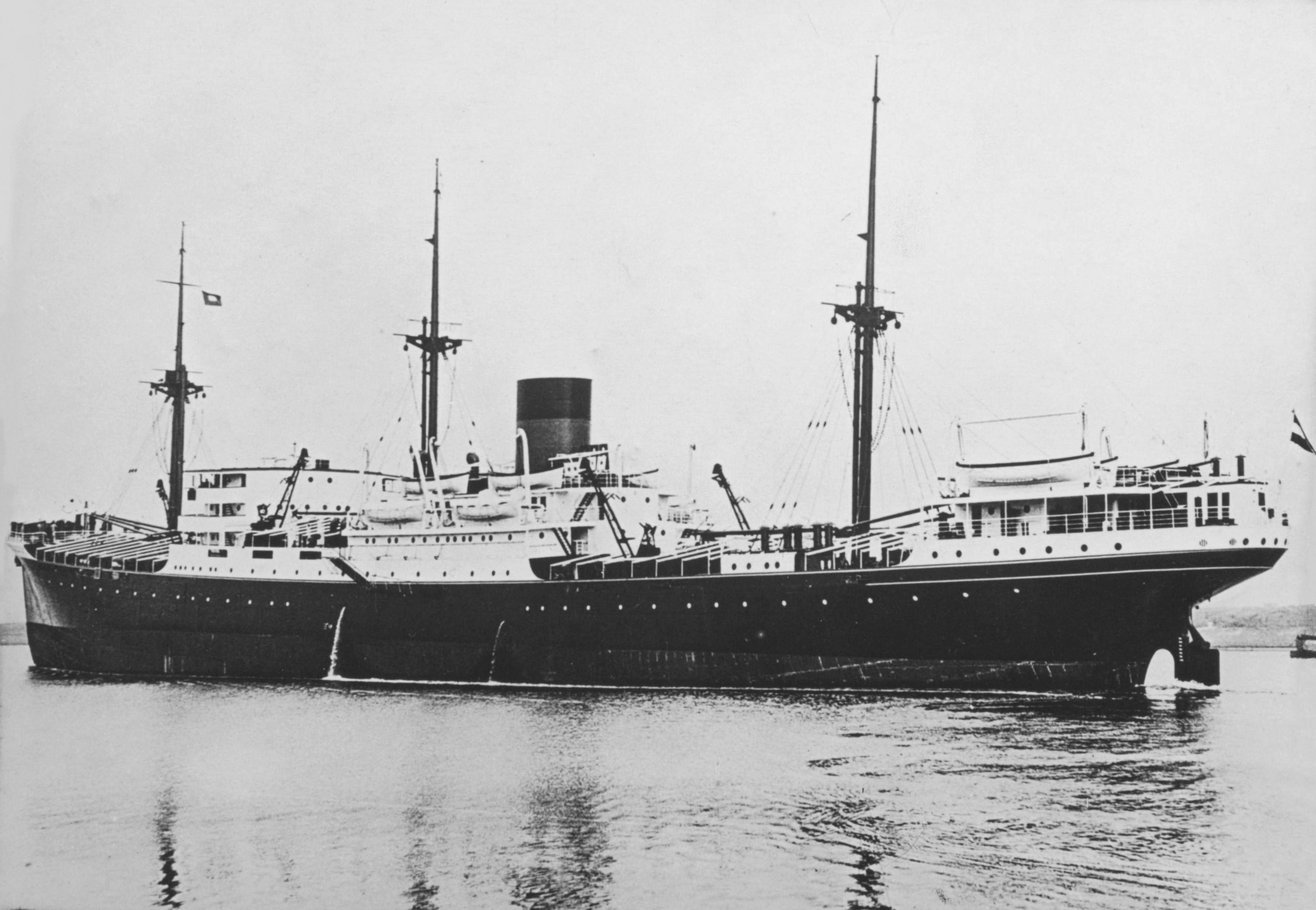
The Dutch cargo liner Tajandoen

On 18 November, before Sliedrecht's survivors were rescued, a German mine in the Thames Estuary sank the Dutch passenger liner Simon Bolivar, killing a large number of her passengers and crew. On 24 November, shortly after Pieter Brons and his four shipmates reached Scotland, the Netherlands protested to Germany at Sliedrecht's sinking. It made a further protest on 7 December. However, also on 7 December, another U-boat torpedoed another Dutch merchant ship, the Netherland Line motor ship Tajandoen, killing six of her crew.

Germany warned that unless the Netherlands ceased transporting goods to Britain, "the German Government would not consider her truly neutral", and claimed that "True neutrality... involved declining to ship anything to Britain." Unofficially, Germany also urged neutral countries, including the Netherlands, that they should arm their merchant ships to resist the Allied blockade of Germany. The authoritative Nieuwe Rotterdamsche Courant newspaper dismissed as "ridiculous" the German idea of Dutch ships trying to break the Royal Navy blockade. It added that it would be "even more absurd" to arm or convoy Dutch merchant ships to resist the Royal Navy.

== Bibliography ==
- Barrett, Roger, ed. (2019). The Wreck of the Louis Sheid 1939 (PDF). Salcombe: Salcombe Maritime Museum.
- Lloyd's Register of Shipping. Vol. II.–Steamers & Motorships. London: Lloyd's Register of Shipping. 1926 – via Internet Archive.
- Lloyd's Register of Shipping (PDF). Vol. II.–Steamers and Motorships of 300 tons gross and over. London: Lloyd's Register of Shipping. 1930 – via Southampton City Council.
- Lloyd's Register of Shipping (PDF). Vol. II.–Steamers and Motorships of 300 tons gross and over. London: Lloyd's Register of Shipping. 1932 – via Southampton City Council.
- Lloyd's Register of Shipping (PDF). Vol. II.–Steamers and Motorships of 300 tons gross and over. London: Lloyd's Register of Shipping. 1934 – via Southampton City Council.
- Lloyd's Register of Shipping (PDF). Vol. I.–Steamers and Motorships of 300 tons, Trawlers, Tugs, Dredgers, &c. London: Lloyd's Register of Shipping. 1939 – via Southampton City Council.
