= Devon Birds =

Birdwatching collective

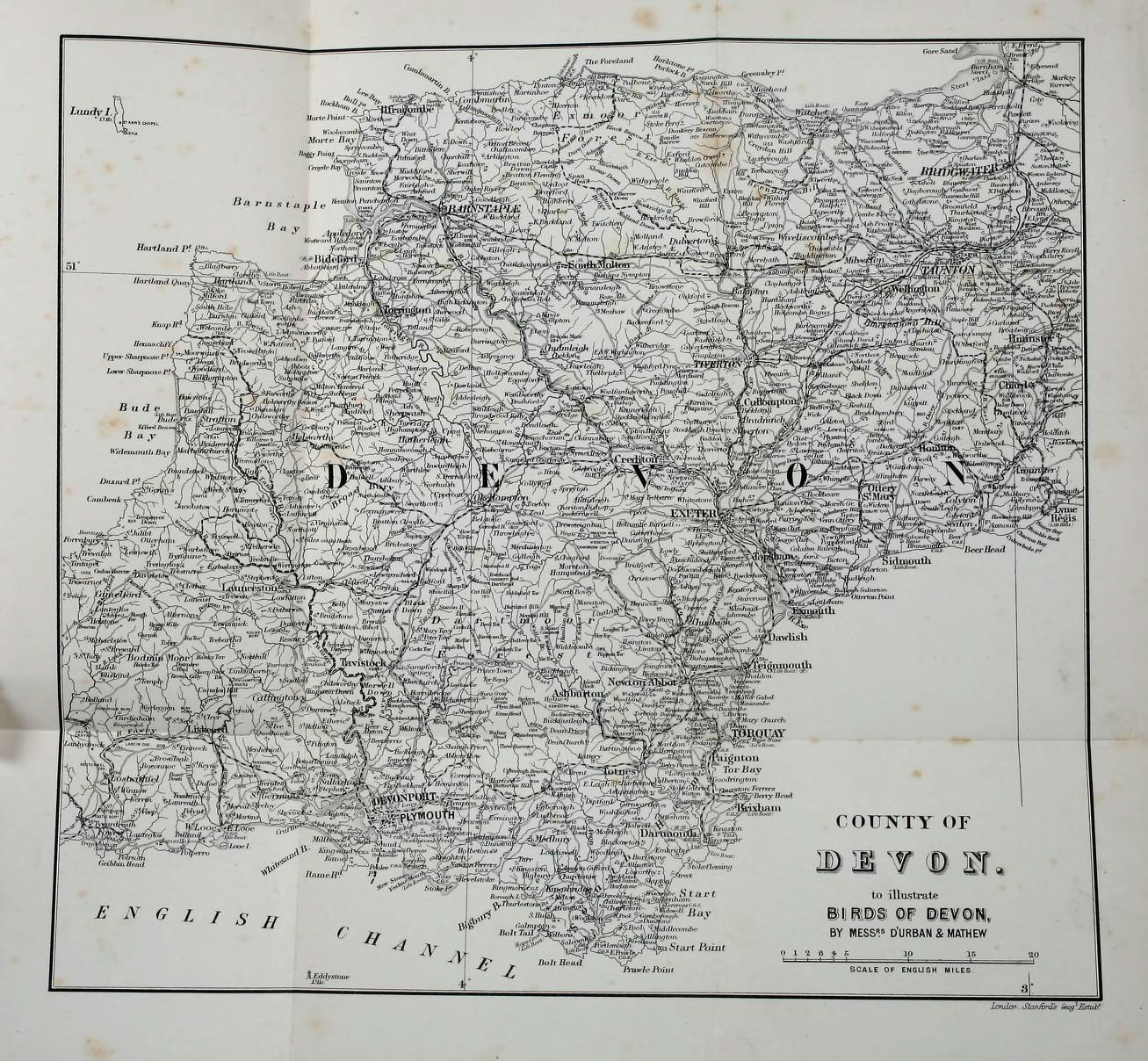
The birds of Devon

Devon Birds, known as the Devon Bird Watching & Preservation Society from its founding in 1928 until it was renamed in 2005, is one of the UK's regional ornithological societies.

== History and work ==
The society was formed for birdwatchers and ornithologists in Devon, England, in 1928, making it one of the oldest ornithological societies in the country. It organises lectures, field trips and research, and publishes newsletters bimonthly and reports three times a year. It is a registered charity, number 228966. The society's logo is a Montagu's harrier. The differences between the hen harrier and the Montagu's were first described by George Montagu, a naturalist based in Kingsbridge.

It is responsible for, or is involved in, a number of reserves. These include South Milton Ley; a site at Prawle Point; a hide at Fernworthy Reservoir on Dartmoor; a site at Bradiford; and a ringing hut at Slapton Ley, data from which has been passed to the British Trust for Ornithology since 1960 for inclusion in national and international records and studies.

The society is a member of the Devon Biodiversity Steering Group and provides data to various environmental plans initiated by Devon County Council—for instance, in 2005 it contributed data to the Devon Biodiversity Action Plan. In 1993 and 2003 the society was a major partner in the barn owl surveys undertaken in Devon by the Barn Owl Trust, and in 2009 it is helping fund a project to boost the birds' numbers in West Devon.

In 2002 it was reported in the national press that Gordon Vaughan, a chairman of the society, and one of Devon's most respected ornithologists, had discovered that dormice, newly emerged from hibernation, were eating the eggs of pied flycatchers, a rare bird in Devon.

== Notable members ==
Past and present

- Tony Soper – DBWPS President 1969–1970
- Dr. Janet Kear OBE – DBWPS President 1995–2003

== Publications ==
- Bi-monthly Bulletin
- Devon Birds published three times a year and incorporating the Annual Report

== See also ==
- Lundy - Conservation work part funded by Devon Birds
- South Milton Ley - SSSI part managed as a nature reserve by Devon Birds
