= SS Louis Sheid =

Belgian-owned cargo steamship, now a recreational dive site off South Devon

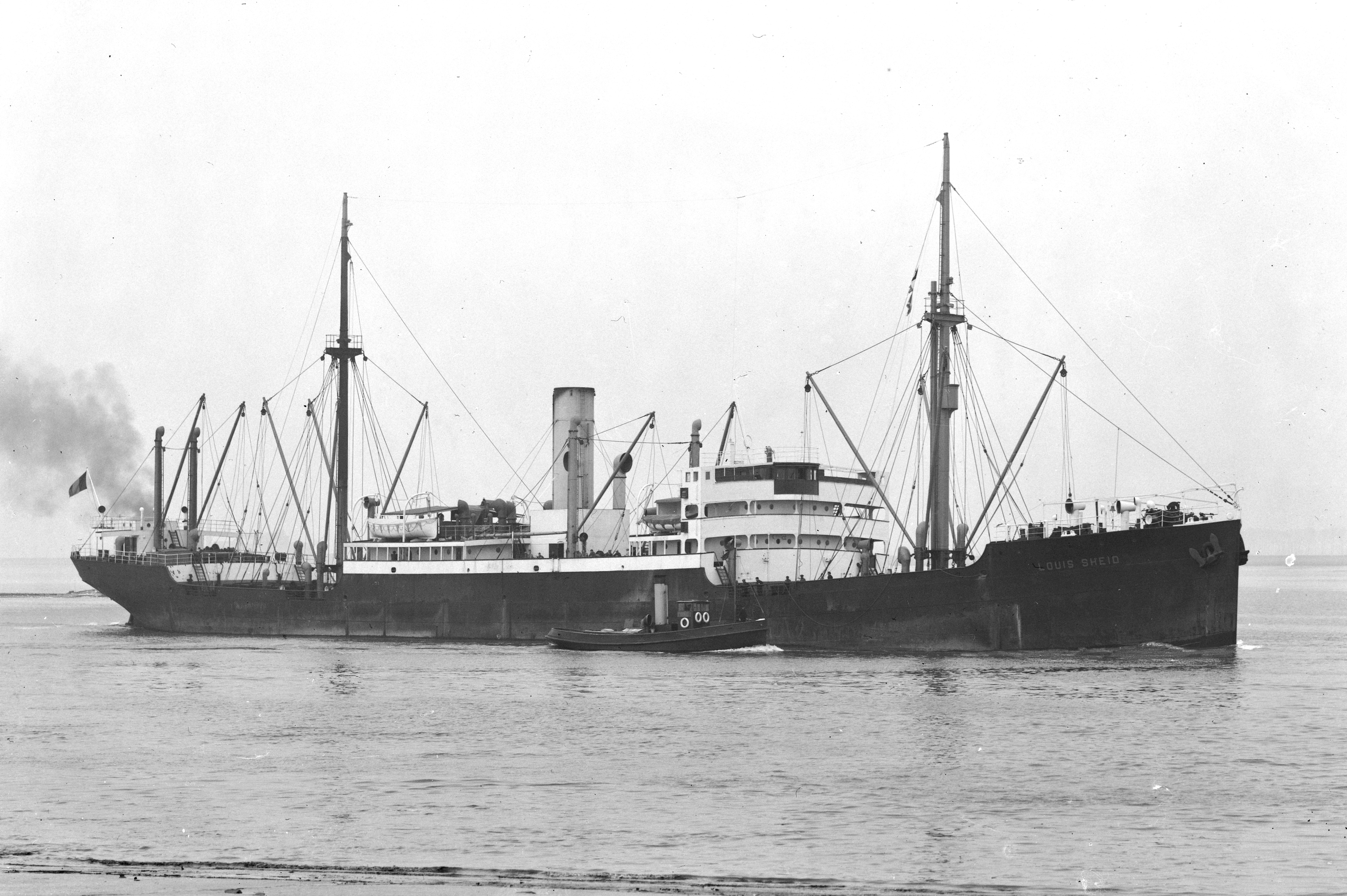
- Louis Sheid, probably on the Scheldt

History
- Name: 1916: Mai Rickmers; 1920: Ultor; 1921: Kendal Castle; 1932: Louis Sheid
- Namesake: 1920: Mars Ultor; 1921: Kendal Castle
- Owner: 1920: Shipping Controller; 1922: Lancashire Shipping Co; 1931: Cie Nat Belge de Trans Mar
- Operator: 1920: RMSP; 1921: James Chambers & Co; 1931: Armement Deppe
- Port of registry: 1920: (United Kingdom) London; 1921: (United Kingdom) Liverpool; 1931: (Belgium) Antwerp
- Ordered: 1916
- Builder: Norddeutsche Werft, Geestemünde
- Laid down: 1916
- Completed: 1920
- Identification: 1920: UK official number 145028; until 1931: code letters KGRF; by 1932: code letters MLOP; by 1934: call sign ONRC
- Fate: wrecked, 8 December 1939

General characteristics
- Type: cargo steamship
- Tonnage: 6,024 GRT, 3,751 NRT
- Length: 419.3 ft (127.8 m) registered
- Beam: 55.7 ft (17.0 m)
- Depth: 29.4 ft (9.0 m)
- Decks: 2
- Installed power: 1 × triple-expansion engine, 414 NHP
- Propulsion: 1 × screw
- Speed: 10 knots (19 km/h)
- Crew: 46
- Sensors & processing systems: by 1937: wireless direction finding

SS Louis Sheid was a cargo steamship that was wrecked in the English Channel in 1939. She was laid down in Bremerhaven in 1916 as Mai Rickmers. She was completed in 1920, and surrendered as World War I reparations to the United Kingdom government, which renamed her Ultor. In 1921 the UK Shipping Controller sold the ship to a British shipping company, which renamed her Kendal Castle. In 1932 Armement Deppe bought her, and renamed her Louis Sheid.

In December 1939, Louis Sheid rescued survivors from the Dutch cargo ship Tajandoen, which a German U-boat had just torpedoed in the English Channel. Louis Sheid then ran aground on the South Devon coast. An RNLI lifeboat rescued Tajandoen's survivors from Louis Sheid. The next morning, Louis Sheid's crew were rescued by Breeches buoy to the shore. The wreck became a total loss, and broke in two. Most of it was salvaged, but what remains is now a recreational dive site.

== Namesakes ==
The ship was one of at least two to have been named Mai Rickmers. The other was built in 1909.

She was one of at least four ships to have been named after Kendal Castle in Westmorland. A wooden schooner of that name was built in 1839 and sank in 1859. Two steamships named Kendal Castle were built in Sunderland, County Durham. The first was launched in 1896, sold and renamed in 1901, and scrapped in 1959. The second was launched in 1910, and sunk by anemy action in 1918.

She was also one of at least two ships to have been named Louis Sheid. The other was the Victory ship Pontotoc Victory, which was renamed Louis Sheid in 1947.

== Building ==
The Rickmers shipping line of Bremerhaven ordered the ship from Norddeutsche Werft in Geestemünde in Bremerhaven. She was laid down in 1916 as Mai Rickmers, but the First World War seems to have delayed her completion.

Her registered length was 419.3 ft (127.8 m), her beam was 55.7 ft (17.0 m), and her depth was 29.4 ft (9.0 m). Her tonnages were 6,024 GRT and 3,751 NRT. She had a single screw, driven by a three-cylinder triple-expansion engine. It was rated at 414 NHP, and gave her a speed of 10 knots (19 km/h).

== Changes of owner and name ==
In 1920 the ship was completed, and surrendered to the UK under Article 231 of the Treaty of Versailles. The Shipping Controller renamed her Ultor, after the vengeance persona of the Roman god Mars. She was registered in London, her UK official number was 145028, and her code letters were KGRF. The Shipping Controller appointed the Royal Mail Steam Packet Company to manage her.

In 1921, the Shipping Controller sold or transferred Ultor to the Lancashire Shipping Company, whose ships were managed by James Chambers & Co of Liverpool. They had owned and managed the two Kendal Castle steamships that were built in Sunderland in 1896 and 1910. A U-boat had sunk the latter Kendal Castle in 1918, killing 18 or 19 members of her crew. Chambers renamed Ulltor as Kendal Castle, and registered her in Liverpool.

In 1931, the Compagnie Nationale Belge de Transports Maritimes bought Kendal Castle, renamed her Louis Sheid, registered her in Antwerp, and appointed Armement Deppe to manage her. By 1932 her code letters were MLOP. By 1934 her wireless telegraph call sign was ONRC, and this had superseded her code letters. By 1937, she was equipped with wireless direction finding.

== Tajandoen ==
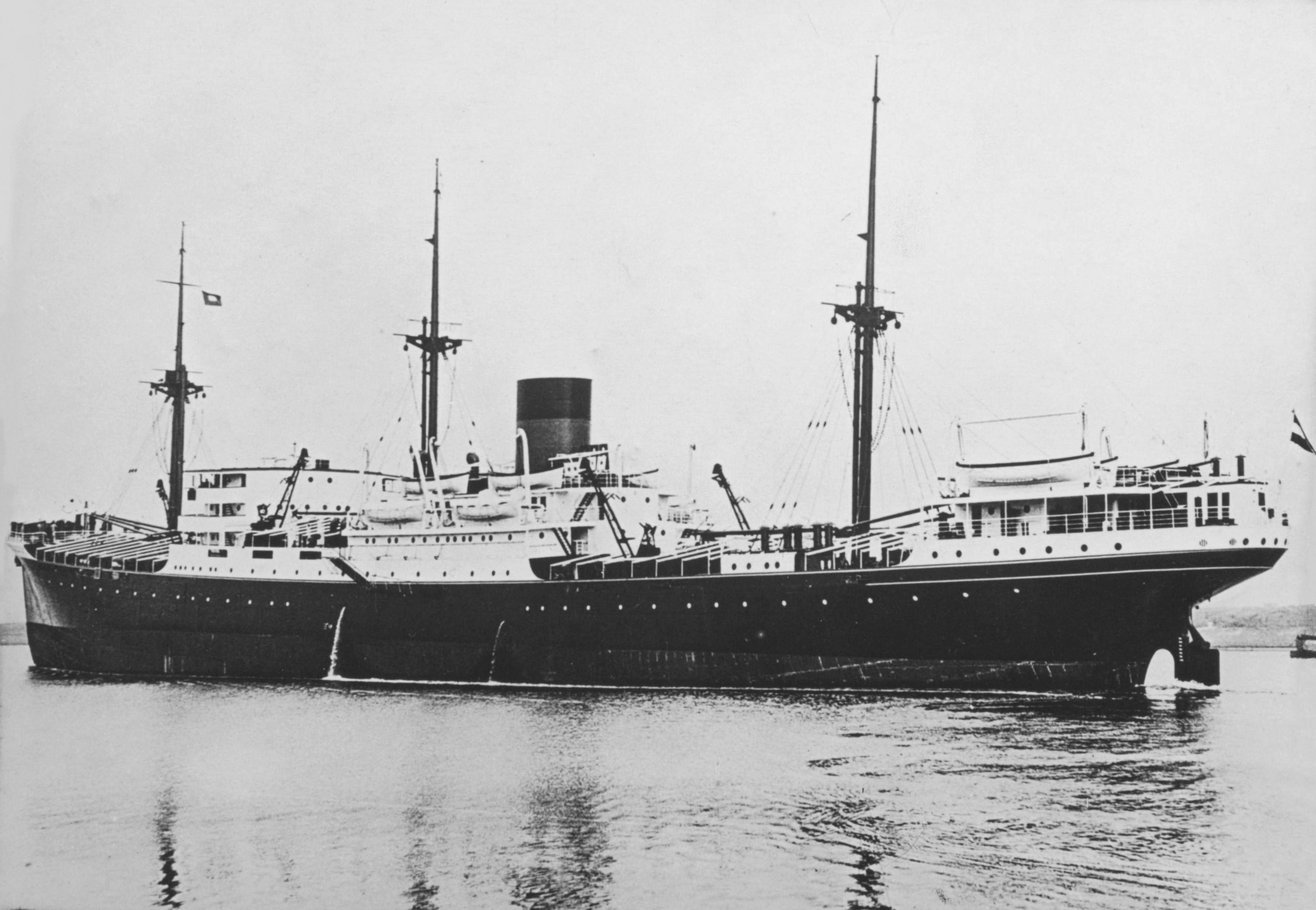
The Dutch motor ship Tajandoen

In the early hours of 7 December 1939, in the western part of the English Channel, U-47 attacked the Netherland Line cargo motor ship Tajandoen, which was en route from Amsterdam to Batavia in the Dutch East Indies. The Netherlands was neutral at the time, but at 05:24 hrs, the U-boat hit the motor ship with one torpedo amidships. Six members of Tajandoen's crew were killed, and the ship broke in two and sank within 15 minutes, spilling 800 tons of burning heavy fuel oil onto the surface of the sea. Two crew members suffered burns before being rescued from the water.

Tajandoen's surviving crew launched her lifeboats. Her Master, 47 of her crew, and all 14 of her passengers survived. The survivors included five women, and two children, aged five and 12.

Louis Sheid was about 7 to 8 nautical miles (13 to 15 km) away, en route from Buenos Aires to Antwerp with a cargo of grain. Her Master was Captain E van Queckelberghe. He was making his last voyage before he was due to retire. One of Louis Sheid's able seamen, who was on the morning watch, saw a bright flash, but it was too distant for him to see what caused it. About ten minutes later, Louis Sheid's chief officer and third officer identified "flames... rising from the surface of the water as well as from the vessel, which was then ablaze". They told Captain van Queckelberghe, who ordered a change of course toward the flames.

After about two and a half or three hours, Louis Sheid reached the scene of the wreck. She found a lifeboat, commanded by Tajandoen's Chief Officer, and carrying 22 members of her crew. Louis Sheid rescued them, and transmitted a wireless telegraph signal to warn ships in the area what had happened to Tajandoen. She then found a second lifeboat, which carried another six people.

An Italian cargo steamship, Giorgio Ohlsen, also arrived. She found a third lifeboat, which was carrying 28 members of Tajandoen's crew, and six of her passengers. Giorgio Ohlsen was bound for Lisbon, which was at least three days' voyage away, whereas Louis Sheid was homeward bound to Antwerp. The Italian ship transferred her 34 survivors to Louis Sheid, in order for them to be put ashore sooner. The Belgian ship remained in the area until about 11:00 hrs, searching for the six men missing from Tajandoen.

== Loss ==
Louis Sheid then headed for England. She neared the coast in a strong southwest wind, heavy sea, and driving rain. The Moon was a waning crescent, only two days before a new Moon, so there was almost no moonlight. Britain was under blackout regulations, so there were no lights ashore, apart from lighthouses and other official navigation lights. Early in the evening of 7 December, Louis Sheid entered Bigbury Bay in South Devon, about 13 nautical miles (24 km) southeast of Plymouth. One report states that visibility from the ship was only about 20 yards (18 m). However, the same report states that people ashore saw the ship, saw she was in danger, and alerted the local HM Coastguard station to warn her.

At about 19:20 hrs local time, Louis Sheid struck a sandbank near the shore. She tried to free herself, running her engine ahead, and then astern, but without success. The heavy sea then drove her onto Books Rocks at Thurlestone, which is inshore just below what was then the Links Hotel (now Links Court apartments). Her wireless operator transmitted an SOS signal, and Captain van Queckelberghe fired rockets in a distress signal.

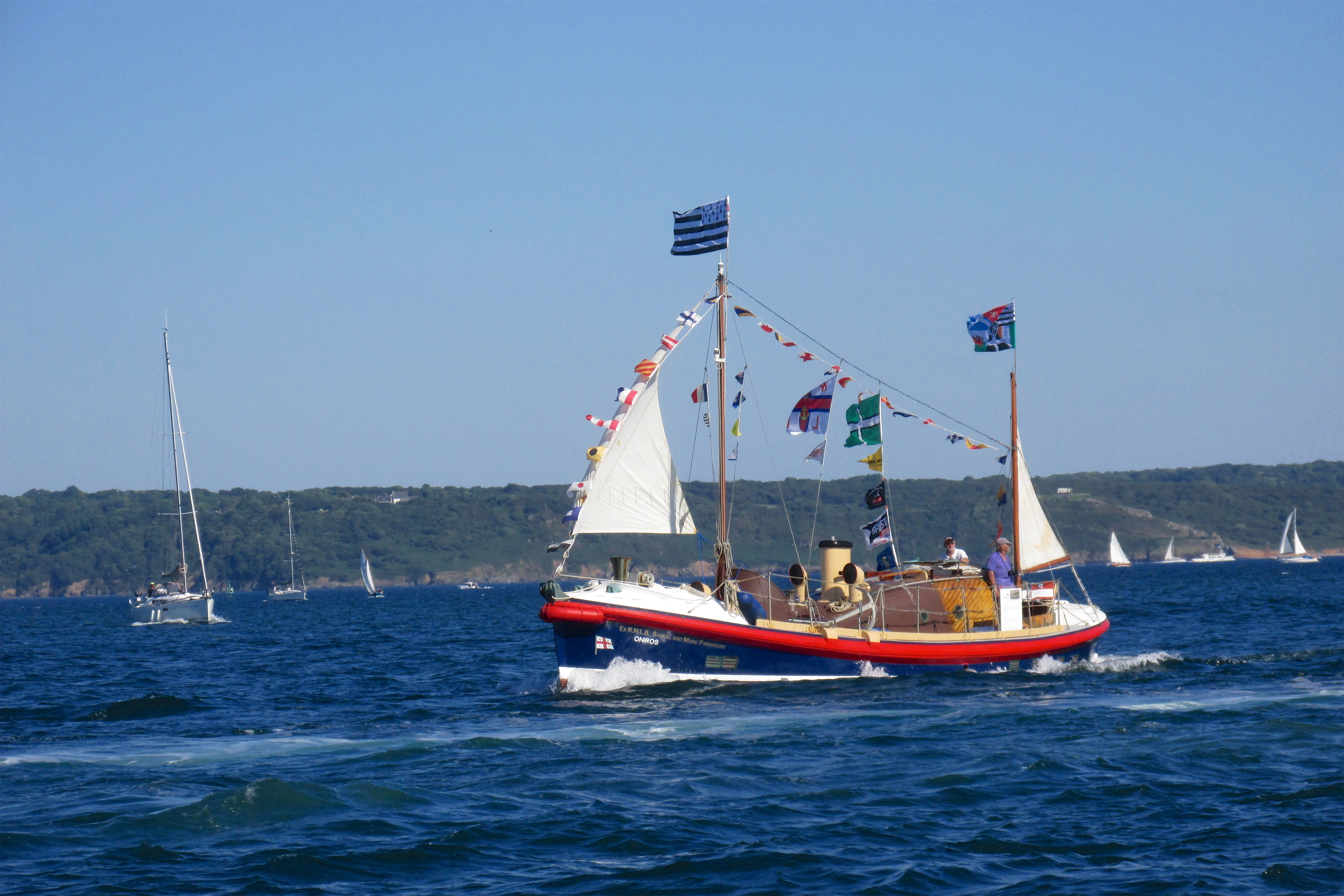
The former Salcombe lifeboat Samuel and Marie Parkhouse, which is now the pleasure boat Oniros. She rescued Tajandoen's 62 survivors from Louis Sheid.

At 19:35 hrs, a retired lifeboatman living in Hope Cove alerted Edward Distin, the coxswain of Salcombe Lifeboat Station. The lifeboat, Samuel and Marie Parkhouse, was launched at 19:45 hrs, and reached Louis Sheid at 21:20 hrs. The lifeboat came along the steamship's port side, rescued 40 of Tajandoen's survivors, and took them to Hope Cove. There the survivors were transferred to local fishing boats, which took them ashore. The lifeboat returned to Louis Sheid, rescued the remaining 22 of Tajandoen's survivors, and took them to Hope Cove to be transferred ashore. The injured were taken by ambulance 30 miles (48 km) to hospital, and the remainder were cared for at the Cottage Hotel.

The lifeboat then returned to the steamship, but Louis Sheid's crew planned to remain aboard overnight, to try to save and refloat their ship. The lifeboat therefore stood by until the morning of 8 December. Louis Sheid failed to free herself, so Captain van Queckelberghe decided to order his crew to abandon ship. A rescue party ashore fired a rocket and line to the ship, by which a Breeches buoy was set up between the ship and the shore, a distance of about 600 yards (550 m). Transferring the crew from ship to shore began soon after 04:00 hrs, and was completed soon after 10:00 hrs. All of Louis Sheid's crew survived, and were helped up a steep cliff path to the Links Hotel. The lifeboat stood by until 08:00 hrs. She reached her moorings at 10:30 hrs, and was brought ashore at 11:00 hrs. Her crew of eight men had been on duty continuously for 18 1/2 .

== Awards ==
In 1940, the RNLI presented awards to volunteers from Salcombe Lifeboat Station, for rescuing Tajandoen's 62 survivors from Louis Sheid. The coxswain, Edward Distin, received the RNLI silver gallantry medal, and the sum of £5 16s 6d. Seven members of his crew each received the bronze gallantry medal and £5 16s 6d. The Secretary of the lifeboat station, Captain JL Ames, was awarded a barometer, on which was a commemorative inscription. The awards were announced in February, and made early in June. The RNLI also gave awards to other local men for helping in the rescue. Jack Jarvis of Hope Cove was awarded a barometer, and the two other fishermen were each awarded £3.

== Salvage ==
By 14 December 1939, work had begun to salvage Louis Sheid's cargo of grain, by transferring it to lighters. It was hoped that, once she was lightened by discharging her cargo, the ship could be refloated. Salvage work continued into early January 1940, and much of her cargo was saved. Salvors then hoped to jettison her remaining cargo to lighten her, but early in February the weather worsened, and so did the ship's position on the shore. By late February, a gale had broken her in two.

In 1942, some of the metal of the ship was salvaged. On 29 April that year, eight salvage workers who had been on the wreck were caught in a gale, and got stranded on Book Rock with their 16-foot (5 m) boat. The Salcombe lifeboat was launched and rescued them. After the war, more of Louis Sheid's metal was salvaged, leaving little except her double bottom and her boilers.

== Dive site ==
What remains of Louis Sheid lies off Thurlestone beach at position 50°15.7357′N 3°51.8197′W, at a depth of 26 feet (8 m). Two Thirds Blue Sub-Aqua Club (SAA 912) adopted the wreck under a scheme run by the Nautical Archaeology Society.

== Bibliography ==
- Barrett, Roger, ed. (2019). The Wreck of the Louis Sheid 1939 (PDF). Salcombe: Salcombe Maritime Museum. – includes several news photographs of the rescue, and the wreck in 1939 and 1940.
- Hall, Suzanne; McDonald, Kendall (1996). Dive South Devon. Diver Guides. London: Underwater World Publications. pp. 157–158. ISBN 0-946020-24-8.
- Lloyd's Register of British and Foreign Shipping. Vol. I.–Steamers. London: Lloyd's Register of Shipping. 1897 – via Internet Archive.
- Lloyd's Register of British and Foreign Shipping. Vol. I.–Steamers. London: Lloyd's Register of Shipping. 1910 – via Internet Archive.
- Lloyd's Register of British and Foreign Shipping. Vol. I.–Steamers. London: Lloyd's Register of Shipping. 1911 – via Internet Archive.
- Lloyd's Register of Shipping. Vol. II.–Steamers. London: Lloyd's Register of Shipping. 1920 – via Internet Archive.
- Lloyd's Register of Shipping. Vol. II.–Steamers. London: Lloyd's Register of Shipping. 1921 – via Internet Archive.
- Lloyd's Register of Shipping (PDF). Vol. II.–Steamers and Motorships of 300 tons gross and over. London: Lloyd's Register of Shipping. 1930 – via Southampton City Council.
- Lloyd's Register of Shipping (PDF). Vol. II.–Steamers and Motorships of 300 tons gross and over. London: Lloyd's Register of Shipping. 1932 – via Southampton City Council.
- Lloyd's Register of Shipping (PDF). Vol. II.–Steamers and Motorships of 300 tons gross and over. London: Lloyd's Register of Shipping. 1934 – via Southampton City Council.
- Lloyd's Register of Shipping (PDF). Vol. II.–Steamers and Motorships of 300 tons gross and over. London: Lloyd's Register of Shipping. 1937 – via Southampton City Council.
- Lloyd's Register of Shipping. Vol. II.–Steamers and Motorships of 300 tons gross and over. London: Lloyd's Register of Shipping. 1947 – via Internet Archive.
- Mercantile Navy List. London: Registrar General of Shipping and Seamen. 1921 – via Crew List Index Project.
- Mercantile Navy List. London: Registrar General of Shipping and Seamen. 1922 – via Crew List Index Project.
