= Bantham =

Village in Devon, England

Coordinates: 50.2783°N 03.8689°W

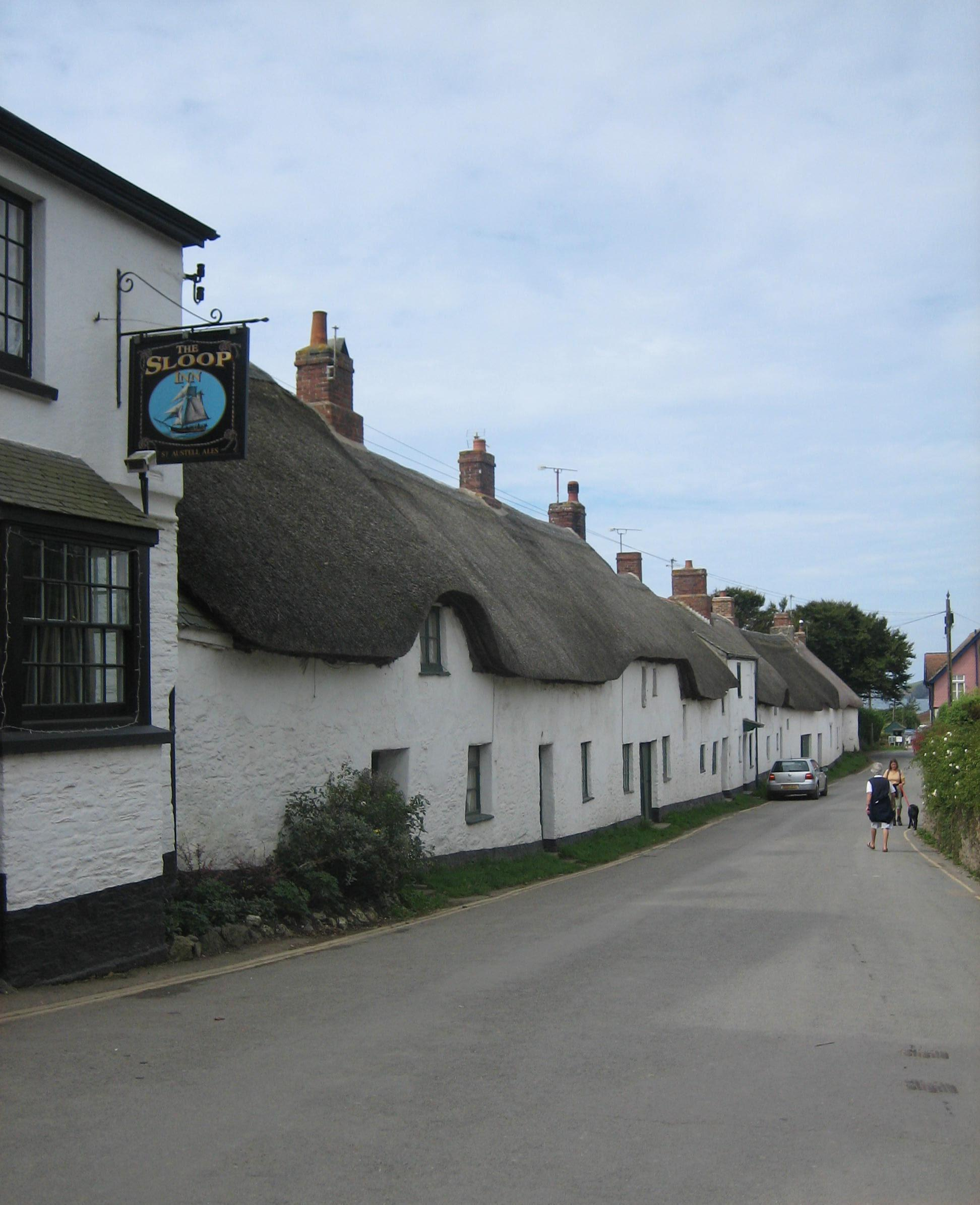
- The pub and street in Bantham

- Location within Devon
- OS grid reference: SX6643
- Civil parish: Thurlestone
- District: South Hams
- Shire county: Devon
- Region: South West
- Country: England
- Sovereign state: United Kingdom
- Police: Devon and Cornwall
- Fire: Devon and Somerset
- Ambulance: South Western

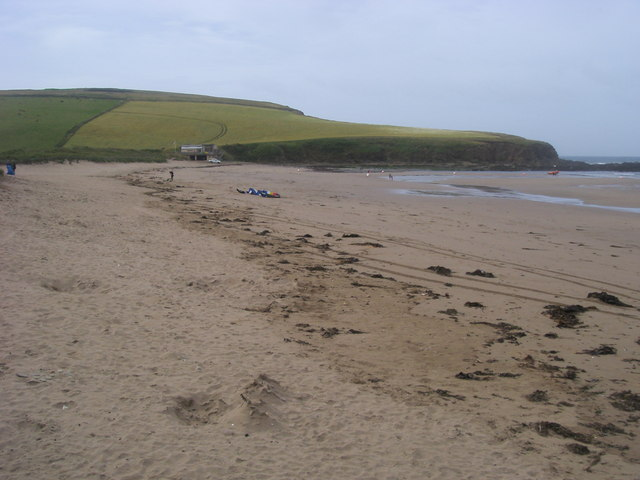
Bantham Beach

Bantham /ˈbænθəm/ is a coastal village in the civil parish of Thurlestone, in south Devon, England. It is in the South Hams district and lies on the estuary of the River Avon a quarter of a mile from the sea at Bigbury Bay.

== History ==
Originally a fishing village, it was first documented as a port selling tin and various tin-made products to the Gauls during Roman times. During their occupation, the Romans built a large settlement to protect the entrance to the river at Bantham Ham, behind the dunes and to the west of the current village. The settlement, with evidence of an associated seasonal trading market, existed well into post-Roman Britain times. Later covered by sand, the settlement is known to have existed from the mid-18th century, after storms uncovered its burnt remains. As the landowners drained the local marshes during the 19th century, the workers were in part rewarded by being allowed to take the recovered human bones away and sell them. Since 1978, extensive archeological excavations have tracked the extent of the settlement, and it is now a scheduled ancient monument protected by English Heritage.

Between 1750 and around 1880, it became a regional centre for the pilchard trading industry during the Cornish pilchard-boom. During this time, the extensive regional stocks of pilchards were processed at salting plants in Cornwall, and then shipped to the Roman Catholic countries of France and Spain. From there, there were either consumed locally or traded directly to Italy – still the primary market for salt pilchards today – where they were used in rustic dishes to give flavour to the staple diet of pasta or polenta. Due to over-fishing, as the trade quickly died the village went into steep decline.

== Evans Estates and ownership ==
Post his World War I duties, in 1919 Lt Cdr Charles Evans bought the defunct village smithy. Having fallen in love with the place, in 1922 he bought the entire village, including over 750 acres (300 ha) of surrounding land on both sides of the river. In 1937, Evans commissioned Sebastian Comper, son of the ecclesiastical architect, Ninian Comper, to design the Bantham Coronation Boathouse on the quay to commemorate the accession and coronation of George VI and his consort, Queen Elizabeth. After World War II the family placed the estate into a private limited company, Evans Estates (1956) Limited, which held most of the village, consisting of 40 homes, a pub and a shop, the harbour, Bantham beach and a golf course on the cliff-top. The family kept close control of the village, offering manageable rents, and neither renting out property seasonally nor allowing second or holiday homes.

In light of rising costs, and requests from beach visitors, the company board agreed the introduction of both a Gastrobus (as opposed to a large café), and the lease of the surfing rights to the beach to a surf school. It has since been reported, that the decision and resultant reaction by some residents was the key-driver behind the family in November 2013 deciding to sell the village from May 2014, with an estimated price of £11.5M.

The estate was sold in its entirety in July 2014 to Nicholas Johnston, a property developer, who pledged to "continue to manage and conserve the Estate in the same manner as [the Evans family] have done for the next 100 years". In 2024 the estate was reported to be for sale. In 2025 the estate was purchased by Chilton Home Farms, a business operated by the Aubrey-Fletcher family.

== Present ==
The village has a privately owned beach which is popular with surfers, and is backed by dunes. The beach offers views of nearby Burgh Island.

The river Avon can be crossed via a seasonal pedestrian ferry. This operates between 10 am and 12 pm and again between 2 pm and 4 pm on Monday – Saturdays from late April to late September. The ferry costs £4.75 each way and is popular with walkers on the South West Coast Path as it avoids the need to walk around the Avon estuary.
