= German submarine U-28 (1936) =

German World War II submarine

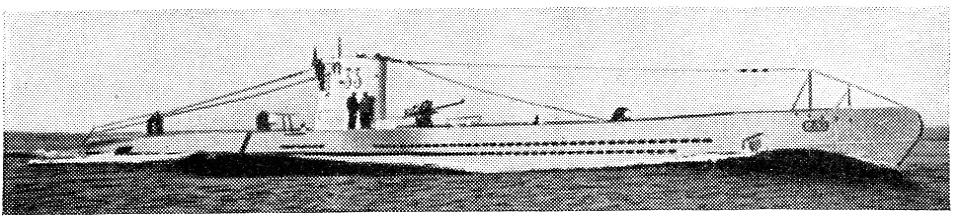
- U-33, a typical Type VIIA boat

History

Nazi Germany
- Name: U-28
- Ordered: 1 April 1935
- Builder: DeSchiMAG AG Weser, Bremen
- Cost: 4,189,000 ℛ︁ℳ︁
- Yard number: 909
- Laid down: 2 December 1935
- Launched: 14 July 1936
- Commissioned: 12 September 1936
- Fate: Damaged in a collision, 17 March 1944, stricken 4 August 1944

General characteristics
- Class & type: Type VIIA submarine
- Displacement: 626 tonnes (616 long tons) surfaced; 745 t (733 long tons) submerged
- Length: 64.51 m (211 ft 8 in) o/a; 45.50 m (149 ft 3 in) pressure hull
- Beam: 5.85 m (19 ft 2 in) o/a; 4.70 m (15 ft 5 in) pressure hull
- Height: 9.50 m (31 ft 2 in)
- Draught: 4.37 m (14 ft 4 in)
- Installed power: 2,100–2,310 PS (1,540–1,700 kW; 2,070–2,280 bhp) (diesels); 750 PS (550 kW; 740 shp) (electric)
- Propulsion: 2 shafts; 2 × diesel engines; 2 × electric motors
- Speed: 17 knots (31 km/h; 20 mph) surfaced; 8 knots (15 km/h; 9.2 mph) submerged
- Range: 6,200 nmi (11,500 km; 7,100 mi) at 10 knots (19 km/h; 12 mph) surfaced; 73–94 nmi (135–174 km; 84–108 mi) at 4 knots (7.4 km/h; 4.6 mph) submerged
- Test depth: 220 m (720 ft); Crush depth: 230–250 m (750–820 ft)
- Complement: 4 officers, 40–56 enlisted
- Sensors & processing systems: Gruppenhorchgerät
- Armament: 5 × 53.3 cm (21 in) torpedo tubes (four bow, one stern); 11 torpedoes or 22 TMA mines or 33 TMB mines; 1 × 8.8 cm (3.46 in) deck gun (220 rounds); 1 × 2 cm (0.79 in) C/30 anti-aircraft gun

Service record
- Part of: 2nd U-boat Flotilla; 12 September 1936 – 9 November 1940; 24th U-boat Flotilla; 10 November 1940 – 30 November 1943; 22nd U-boat Flotilla; 1 December 1943 – 17 March 1944
- Identification codes: M 27 436
- Commanders: Kptlt. Wilhelm Ambrosius; 12 September 1936 – 1 November 1938; Kptlt. Hans-Günther Looff; 1936 / 37 – 30 September 1937; Oblt.z.S. Fritz-Julius Lemp; 28 October – November 1938; Oblt.z.S. / Kptlt. Günter Kuhnke; 28 October 1938 – 16 November 1940; Oblt.z.S. Friedrich Guggenberger; 16 November 1940 – 11 February 1941; Oblt.z.S. Heinrich Ratsch; 12 February – 21 June 1941; Oblt.z.S. Hermann Eckhardt; 22 June 1941 – 20 March 1942; Oblt.z.S. Karl-Heinz Marbach; 1 July – 30 November 1942; Lt.z.S. / Oblt.z.S. Uwe Christiansen; 1 December 1942 – July 1943; Lt.z.S. / Oblt.z.S. Erich Krempl; July – 1 December 1943; Oblt.z.S. Dietrich Sachse; 2 December 1943 – 17 March 1944
- Operations: 6 patrols: 1st patrol: 19 August – 29 September 1939; 2nd patrol: 8 November – 18 December 1939; 3rd patrol: 18 February – 23 March 1940; 4th patrol: 20 May – 6 July 1940; 5th patrol: a. 11 August – 17 September 1940; b. 4 – 6 Oct 1940; 6th patrol: 12 October – 15 November 1940
- Victories: 11 merchant ships sunk (42,252 GRT); 1 auxiliary warship sunk (4,443 GRT); 1 merchant ship total loss (9,577 GRT); 2 merchant ships damaged (10,067 GRT)

German submarine U-28 was a Type VIIA U-boat of Nazi Germany's Kriegsmarine during World War II.

Her keel was laid down on 2 December 1935, by DeSchiMAG AG Weser of Bremen. She was launched on 14 July 1936, and commissioned into Kriegsmarine on 12 September 1936, with Kapitänleutnant Wilhelm Ambrosius in command. Ambrosius was succeeded by nine other commanding officers over the next eight years.

U-28 conducted seven war patrols between 19 August 1939 and 15 November 1940, all under the command of Kapitänleutnant Günter Kuhnke, sinking 13 ships totaling 56,272 gross register tons (GRT) and damaging two others totaling 10,067 GRT.

After her third patrol, U-28 became a training vessel and was used to bring new U-boat crews up to standard. She was sunk in a training accident on 17 March 1944 and stricken on 4 August 1944.

== Construction and design ==
=== Construction ===
U-28 was ordered by the Kriegsmarine on 1 April 1935 as part of the German Plan Z in violation of the Treaty of Versailles. Her keel was laid down in the AG Weser shipyard in Bremen as yard number 909 on 2 December 1935. After about ten months of construction, she was launched on 14 July 1936 and commissioned into the Kriegsmarine as the third Type VIIA submarine on 12 September 1936 under the command of Kapitänleutnant Wilhelm Ambrosius.

=== Design ===
Like all Type VIIA submarines, U-28 displaced 626 tonnes (616 long tons) while surfaced and 745 t (733 long tons) when submerged. She was 64.51 m (211 ft 8 in) in overall length and had a 45.50 m (149 ft 3 in) pressure hull. U-28's propulsion consisted of two MAN 6-cylinder 4-stroke M 6 V 40/46 diesel engines that totaled 2,100–2,310 PS (1,540–1,700 kW; 2,070–2,280 bhp). Her maximum rpm was between 470 and 485. The submarine was also equipped with two Brown, Boveri & Cie GG UB 720/8 electric motors that totaled 750 PS (550 kW; 740 shp). Their maximum rpm was 322. These power plants gave U-28 a maximum speed of 17 knots (31 km/h; 20 mph) while surfaced and 8 knots (15 km/h; 9.2 mph) when submerged. She had a range of 6,200 nmi (11,500 km; 7,100 mi) while traveling at 10 knots (19 km/h; 12 mph) on the surface and 73–94 nmi (135–174 km; 84–108 mi) at 4 knots (7.4 km/h; 4.6 mph) when submerged.

The U-boat's test depth was 220 m (720 ft) but she could go as deep as 230–250 m (750–820 ft) without having her hull crushed. U-28's armament consisted of five 53.3 cm (21 in) torpedo tubes, four in the bow and one astern. She could carry up to 11 torpedoes, 22 TMA mines, or 33 TMB mines. U-28 was also equipped with a C35 88 mm gun/L45 deck gun with 220 rounds. Her anti-aircraft defenses consisted of one 2 cm (0.79 in) anti-aircraft gun.

== Service history ==
=== First patrol ===
U-28's first war patrol took place from 19 August to 29 September 1939. On 14 September, near the mouth of St George's Channel, U-28 sank a 5,000 GRT freighter, her only success of the patrol.

=== Second patrol ===
U-28's second war patrol took place from 8 November to 12 December 1939. She was tasked with laying a minefield near the port city of Swansea. En route to Bristol, U-28 sank two ships: the 5,133 GRT Dutch tanker Sliedrecht and the 5,100 GRT British freighter Royston Grange. U-28 then laid her minefield and returned to port in Germany. While the minefield was not an immediate success, it sank the 9,600 GRT British freighter Protesilaus 60 days after it was laid.

=== Third patrol ===
U-28's third sortie took place from 18 February to 25 March 1940. She was instructed to lay mines off the British Naval Base at Portsmouth. After laying the minefield, she went on to sink two ships for 11,200 GRT.

=== Fourth patrol ===
U-28's fourth war patrol took place from 8 June to 7 July 1940. She was sent to the Western Approaches and turned in an average performance of sinking three ships totalling 10,300 GRT. The Irish government sought an explanation from Germany for the sinking of the neutral Greek ship Adamandios Georgandis "the entire cargo of which comprised grain for exclusive consumption in Éire". She had been sailing from Rosario, Argentina to Cork with a cargo of wheat when she was torpedoed and sunk south-west of Ireland at 43°35′N 11°15′W.

=== Fifth patrol ===
U-28's fifth war patrol took place from 11 August to 17 September 1940 and was one of Kuhnke's most productive. In August, she sank two ships for 5,500 GRT. On 10 September, U-28 found and tracked Convoy OA 210. In the early morning darkness of 11 September, U-28 attacked the convoy, claiming two large freighters (13,000 GRT each) sunk and one 10,000 GRT tanker damaged, bringing Kuhnke's total for the patrol to five ships for 30,000 GRT. However, during the postwar analysis, he was only credited with sinking a 2,000 GRT Dutch freighter and damaging a 4,700 GRT British freighter, which, combined with his earlier sinkings, brought his total to four ships for 9,945 GRT. On his return to Lorient, France, Kuhnke was awarded the Knight's Cross for his work.

=== Sixth patrol ===
U-28's sixth and final war patrol took her from Lorient back to Germany. Hampered by heavy seas and foul weather, U-28 sank only half a ship for 2,694 GRT.; U-28 and U-31 shared credit for the sinking of the SS Matina. On 15 November 1940, she returned to Germany and was turned over to the training command. Günter Kuhnke proceeded to command U-125.

== Fate ==
U-28 sank by accident on 17 March 1944, at the U-boat pier in Neustadt, Germany. During a training exercise, the boat had passed under a dummy freighter used for target practice. The commander-in-training failed to note the position of the stationary freighter, and the U-boat's conning tower was ripped off. Water flooded the control room, but the other compartments remained intact. The crew escaped by slowly equalizing the water pressure in the boat and swimming to the surface. The boat was raised in March 1944, but was stricken on 4 August. The submarine's crew suffered no casualties during her career.

== Wolfpacks ==
U-28 took part in one wolfpack, namely:

- Prien (12 – 17 June 1940)

== Summary of raiding history ==
Date	Name of Ship	Nationality	Tonnage (Note: Merchant ship tonnages are in gross register tons. Military vessels are listed by tons displacement.)	Fate
14 September 1939	Vancouver City	United Kingdom	4,955	Sunk
17 November 1939	Sliedrecht	Netherlands	5,133	Sunk
25 November 1939	Royston Grange	United Kingdom	5,144	Sunk
21 January 1940	Protesilaus	United Kingdom	9,577	Total loss (mine)
9 March 1940	P. Margoronis	Greece	4,979	Sunk
11 March 1940	Eulota	Netherlands	6,236	Sunk
18 June 1940	Samartia	Finland	2,417	Sunk
19 June 1940	Adamandios Georgandis	Greece	3,443	Sunk
21 June 1940	HMS Prunella	Royal Navy	4,443	Sunk
27 August 1940	Eva	Norway	1,599	Sunk
28 August 1940	Kyno	United Kingdom	3,946	Sunk
9 September 1940	Mardinian	United Kingdom	2,434	Sunk
11 September 1940	Harpenden	United Kingdom	4,678	Damaged
11 September 1940	Maas	Netherlands	1,966	Sunk
26 October 1940	Matina	United Kingdom	5,389	Damaged

== Bibliography ==
- Busch, Rainer; Röll, Hans-Joachim (1999). German U-boat commanders of World War II : a biographical dictionary. Translated by Brooks, Geoffrey. London; Annapolis, MD: Greenhill Books, Naval Institute Press. ISBN 1-55750-186-6.
- Busch, Rainer; Röll, Hans-Joachim (1999). Deutsche U-Boot-Verluste von September 1939 bis Mai 1945 [German U-boat losses from September 1939 to May 1945]. Der U-Boot-Krieg (in German). Vol. IV. Hamburg, Berlin, Bonn: Mittler. ISBN 3-8132-0514-2.
- Gröner, Erich; Jung, Dieter; Maass, Martin (1991). U-boats and Mine Warfare Vessels. German Warships 1815–1945. Vol. 2. Translated by Thomas, Keith; Magowan, Rachel. London: Conway Maritime Press. ISBN 0-85177-593-4.
- Edwards, Bernard (1996). Dönitz and the Wolf Packs - The U-boats at War. pp. 23, 42, 47. ISBN 0-304-35203-9.
