= South Milton Ley =

Devonian wetland, designated a SSSI

Coordinates: 50.26510°N 3.84639°W

South Milton Ley (grid reference SX685422) is a 162,000 square metres (40 acres) wetland in the South Hams, Devon, England. It was notified as a Site of Special Scientific Interest in 1976. Part of the site is managed as a nature reserve by the Devon Birdwatching and Preservation Society.

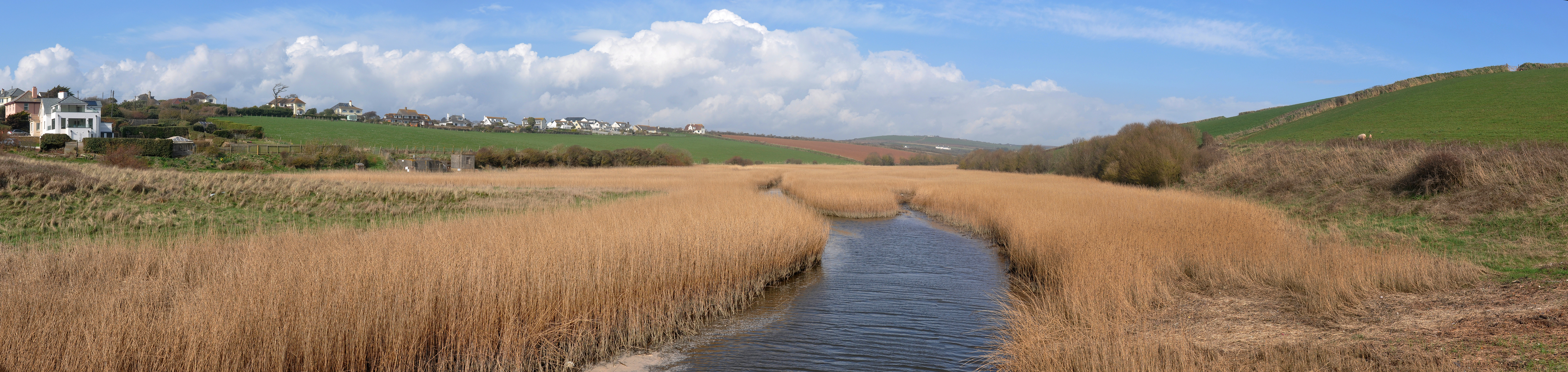
South Milton Ley

== Site description ==
South Milton Ley lies in a shallow coastal river valley separated from the sea by a sand bar. Adjacent to this bar, the waters of the Ley are slightly brackish due to occasional tidal influence, but upstream they give way to freshwater. The main habitat at the Ley is freshwater reedbed; this habitat is scarce in Devon and is the reason for the site's SSSI status.

== Vegetation ==
The reedswamp of the lower Ley is dominated by common reed (Phragmites australis), while further upstream the vegetation contains a mixture of other tall fen species including hemlock water-dropwort (Oenanthe crocata), yellow flag (Iris pseudacorus), great willowherb (Epilobium hirsutum) and reed sweet-grass (Glyceria maxima). There are also dense stands of willow (Salix) in the middle areas of these upper regions.

== Birds ==
South Milton's reedbed supports breeding reed, sedge and Cetti's warblers; bearded tit has also bred at the site in the past. The reedbed is used as a roost site by a variety of birds on passage, in particular yellow wagtail and swallow.

In 2005, Devon's first black-headed wagtail and second least sandpiper were present at the site (the former having previously been present at West Charleton Marsh and also at South Huish Marsh, the latter moving from the Ley to Thurlestone Marsh).
