= Otto Kretschmer =

German naval officer (1912–1998)

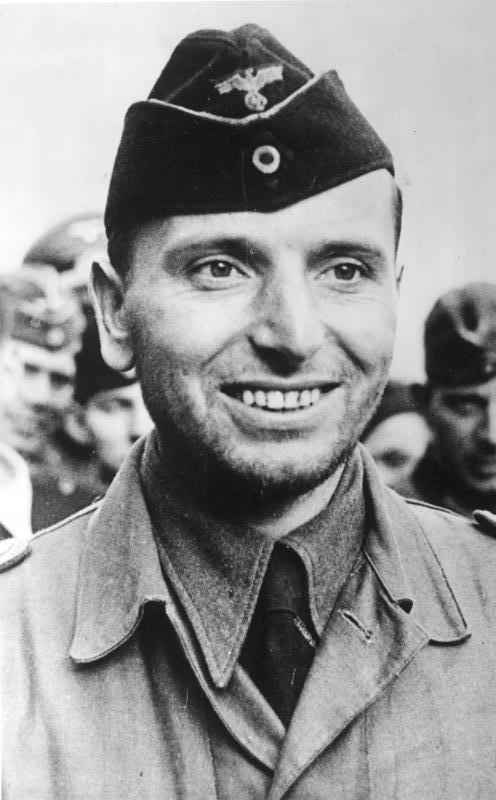
- Kapitänleutnant Kretschmer, November 1940
- Born: 1 May 1912; Heidau, Neisse District, Province of Silesia, Kingdom of Prussia, German Empire (now Hajduki Nyskie, Poland)
- Died: 5 August 1998 (aged 86); Straubing, Bavaria, Federal Republic of Germany
- Military career
- Allegiance: Weimar Republic (to 1933); Nazi Germany (to 1945); West Germany
- Branch: Reichsmarine; Kriegsmarine; German Navy
- Service years: 1930–1945; 1955–1970
- Rank: Reichsmarine (1930–1935): Leutnant zur See; Kriegsmarine (1935–1945): Fregattenkapitän; Bundesmarine (1955–1970): Flottillenadmiral
- Nickname: Otto der Schweiger (Silent Otto)
- Units: 2nd U-boat Flotilla; 1st U-boat Flotilla; 7th U-boat Flotilla
- Commands: U-35, 31 July 1937 – 15 August 1937; U-23, 1 October 1937 – 1 April 1940; U-99, 18 April 1940 – 17 March 1941
- Awards: Knight's Cross of the Iron Cross with Oak Leaves and Swords

August Wilhelm Otto Kretschmer (1 May 1912 – 5 August 1998) was a German naval officer and submariner in World War II and the Cold War.

From September 1939 until his capture in March 1941 he sank 47 ships, including one warship, for a record total of 274,333 tons. For this he received the Knight's Cross of the Iron Cross with Oak Leaves and Swords, among other awards. He earned the nickname "Silent Otto", both for his successful use of the "silent running" capability of U-boats and for his reluctance to transmit radio messages during patrols. After the war, he served in the German Federal Navy, from which he retired in 1970 with the flag rank of Rear Admiral.

== Early life and career ==
Kretschmer was born in Heidau near Neisse, then in the German Empire on 1 May 1912 to Friedrich Wilhelm Otto and Alice (née Herbig) Kretschmer. His father was a teacher at the local Volkschule (primary school), which Otto attended from 1918 to 1921. He then moved to a Realgymnasium (secondary school). In the aftermath of World War I the Kretschmer family remained aloof from the political turbulence of the Weimar era. Kretschmer indulged in sporting pastimes and scientific interests. Kretschmer achieved good results in mathematics and chemistry and passed his Abitur (school-leaving certificate) at 17. The report contained the remark, "Kretschmer demonstrated his extraordinary courage in many instances. He wants to be a naval officer." Kretschmer was too young to enlist at 17 and his father sent him to England to broaden his horizons. He enrolled at Exeter University (then University College of the South West of England) and studied under Professor Jacob Wilhelm Schopp (b. 1871), a German–born naturalised Briton. He mastered the English language and came to respect British education: its practical focus complemented his scientific and theoretical–based German background. His time in England shaped his view of them during the war. He was quick to believe in rumours of new British inventions during the war at sea. He returned home when his mother died of tetanus because of medical malpractice. He did not return to England, but travelled through France, Switzerland and Italy.

=== Reichsmarine ===
Kretschmer entered the Reichsmarine (Weimar Navy) on 1 April 1930 as See Offizier Anwärter (naval officer cadet). Kretschmer formed part of "Crew 30" (the incoming class of 1930), 78–strong intake of officer candidates. He underwent basic military training in the 2nd department of the standing ship division of the Baltic Sea in Stralsund (1 April 1930 – 30 June 1930). (Note: 2nd department —II. Abteilung) (Note: standing ship division —Schiffsstammdivision) Kretschmer was transferred to the training ship Niobe (1 July 1930 – 9 October 1930), attaining the rank of Seekadett (cadet) on 9 October 1930 before embarking on a 14-month stay on board the cruiser Emden (10 October 1930 – 4 January 1932), which took him to the Far East through the Mediterranean and Suez Canal. The Emden made stops in Ceylon, the Philippines, China and Japan; then Guam, South Africa, Angola and Spain on the return journey. A month after the Emden's return to Wilhelmshaven on 2 December 1931, Kretschmer and his crew mates were promoted to the rank of Fähnrich zur See (midshipman) on 1 January 1932.

Following his journey on Emden, Kretschmer attended a naval infantry course for cadets at Stralsund (5 January–31 March 1932), (Note: infantry course for cadets—Infanterielehrgang für Fähnriche) before starting with the main cadet course at the Naval Academy Mürwik on 1 April 1932. (Note: main cadet course—Hauptlehrgang für Fähnriche) This course was interrupted by two brief assignments on the survey vessel Meteor (22–25 June 1932 and 10–15 October 1932) for navigation training. His training included a pathfinder course for cadets at Kiel (28 March −22 April 1933), (Note: pathfinder course for cadets—Sperrlehrgang für Fähnriche) an artillery course for cadets at Kiel-Wik (23 April – 28 June 1933), (Note: artillery course for cadets—Artillerielehrgang für Fähnriche) a torpedo course in Mürwik (29 June – 18 August 1933), (Note: torpedo course for cadets—Torpedolehrgang für Fähnriche) an anti-aircraft artillery course at Wilhelmshaven (19–31 August 1933), (Note: anti-aircraft artillery course for cadets—Fla-Waffenlehrgang für Fähnriche) a communication course for cadets at Mürwik again (1–3 September 1933), (Note: communication course for cadets—Nachrichtenlehrgang für Fähnriche) and his first U-boat course at Mürwik (25 September – 1 October 1933).

On 2 October 1933, Kretschmer was transferred to the pocket battleship Deutschland as a gunnery officer during a trip to Denmark. This stay was interrupted for an aerial defense training course at Warnemünde (5–10 March 1934). (Note: aerial defense training course for cadets—Luftschutzlehrgang für Fähnriche) On 19 March 1934, his stay on Deutschland ended and he was transferred to the light cruiser Köln (20 March – 26 September 1934). Kretschmer was present for gunnery exercises in the North and Baltic Sea. At Eckernförde on the 25/26 July 1934 Hitler boarded the ship to observe the exercise. During this assignment, Kretschmer was promoted to Oberfähnrich zur See (Senior Ensign) on 1 April 1934. During another torpedo training course at Flensburg-Mürwik (27 September – 21 December 1934), Kretschmer received his commission as Leutnant zur See on 1 October 1934. On 22 December 1934, Kretschmer was again on Köln serving as the ship's second torpedo officer.

=== Kriegsmarine ===
In 1933 Adolf Hitler and the Nazi Party came to power. The establishment of the Wehrmacht (Nazi German Armed Forces) in 1935 divided the major branches of the armed forces. The Reichsmarine was renamed the Kriegsmarine, a Nazi creation. The OKM was established as the supreme command of the navy responsible for all facets of naval warfare. The renaming of the navy was a symbolic gesture, to erase the unpleasant memories of the 1920s and symbolise a new era. According to one historian, Kretschmer was a patriot and loyal to the government, but later "eschewed Nazi efforts to glorify his success through propaganda."

During Kretschmer's stay on Köln, he attended an aircraft catapult course at Travemünde. (Note: aircraft catapult course —Katapultlehrgang) On 26 September 1935, he was transferred to the 1st department of the standing ship division of the North Sea in Wilhelmshaven where he served as a company officer until 25 January 1936. Kretschmer joined the U-boat service in January 1936. After the completion of his submariner training he was promoted to Oberleutnant zur See (senior-sub lieutenant/Lieutenant Junior Grade) on 1 June 1936. Kretschmer's first operational experience on a submarine was as a lieutenant on the U-35 in 1937 as first watch officer under the command of Klaus Ewerth and then Hans-Rudolf Rösing. Rösing brought his own watch officer, and Kretschmer was demoted to second watch officer. While Kretschmer was discharging his responsibilities for the operational readiness of the deck gun, Rösing dived the ship, leaving Kretschmer stranded in the freezing water. He clung to the periscope in the hope of being seen through the optics. Kretschmer was soon missed and the U-boat surfaced to find him before he succumbed to the cold.

He was given interim command of U-35 in August 1937, and this appointment coincided with Germany's involvement in the Spanish Civil War. The boat was ordered to patrol the Bay of Biscay off the Spanish-French border. The crew were permitted ashore at the resort town of San Sebastián. Rösing's successor, Hermann Michahelles, was killed in a car accident and Kretschmer assumed command for two weeks. U-35 returned to Germany after an uneventful patrol during which no ships were sunk. On 1 October 1937, Kretschmer took command of U-23. Through the remaining Interwar period, Kretschmer developed his own approach to combat, which can be summarized by the phrase "one torpedo, one ship". He dispensed with the standard practice of firing salvoes of torpedoes from long distances. Kretschmer also favoured surfaced attacks as opposed to the recommended submerged engagement, listing 11 Points of Submarine Warfare:

1. Efficient lookouts are of prime importance
2. It is essential not simply to spot the target, but to spot it in good time
3. Lone ships should be attacked on the surface with gunfire in order to save expensive torpedoes
4. Survivors should be assisted when possible
5. Convoys should be attacked in daylight only if it is not feasible to wait for nightfall
6. Attack at night from the dark side of the convoy, so that the target is silhouetted and the submarine is in shadow
7. When there is little or no moonlight, attack from the windward side (to avoid a visible white bow-wave when motoring into the wind)
8. Fire one torpedo per target, not fanned salvoes
9. Fire at close range
10. Once an attack is launched, do not submerge except in circumstances of dire necessity. Remember that on the surface it is easier for you to spot the enemy than for the enemy to spot you
11. Dive only for two hours before dawn each day, to rest the crew, sweep with sound detection equipment, etc.; otherwise, remain on the surface

The 'one torpedo, one ship' tactics implemented by Kretschmer resulted in a very effective usage of torpedoes, as each attack was designed to maximize the chances of a hit. In fact, out of 116 torpedoes fired in action, Kretschmer scored 74 hits (equivalent to a 69.8% success rate). The vast majority of Kretschmer's attacks - at least 83 - were launched on the surface.

Kretschmer was promoted to Kapitänleutnant (captain lieutenant/lieutenant) on 1 June 1939.

== World War II ==
=== U-23: Patrols 1–8 ===
The German invasion of Poland on 1 September 1939 began the war in Europe. Karl Dönitz, Befehlshaber der Unterseeboote (BdU), ordered attacks on Allied shipping at sea, beginning the Battle of the Atlantic. The short range of the Type II submarine allowed for operations in the North Sea, but no further.

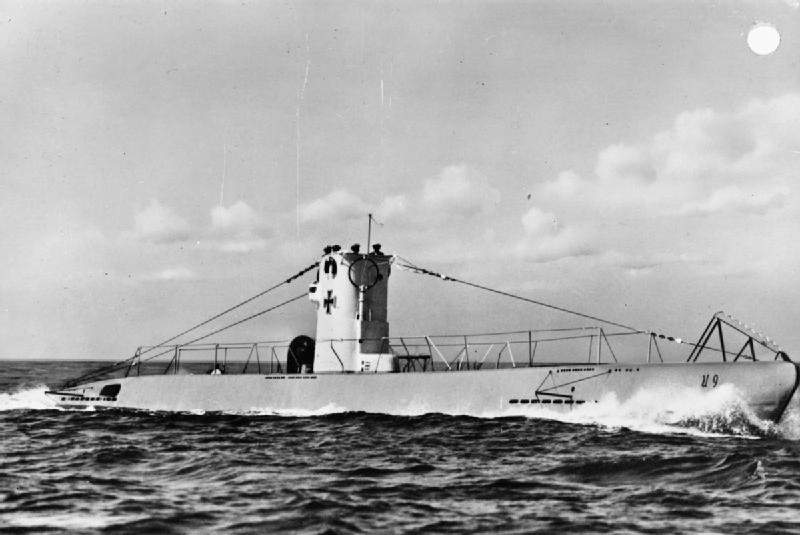
A Type IIB U-boat similar to U-23

Kretschmer and U-23 had departed from Wilhelmshaven on 25 August, one week before the start of World War II. His first patrol, with Oberleutnant zur See Adalbert Schnee as first watch officer, took U-23 into the North Sea and along the coast of the Netherlands. The boat returned to Wilhelmshaven on 4 September. Further patrols took U-23 around the British coast. The main area of operations were the seas and estuaries off East of England and Scotland, with mine-laying operations in the Baltic, to counter the Royal Navy Submarine Service at the end of 1939. A second patrol (9–21 September) yielded no success either. Kretschmer departed from Kiel for the third war patrol on 1 October. On 4 October 1939 he sank the coastal ship Glen Farg (876 GRT). The small freighter was carrying pulp and ferrochrome. Kretschmer waited for the crew to take to the lifeboats before destroying the ship with a torpedo. He returned to Kiel, rather than Wilhelmshaven, on 16 October. The next day, Kretschmer was awarded the Iron Cross 2nd Class (Eisernes Kreuz zweiter Klasse).

The fourth patrol (1–9 November) was unsuccessful. On his fifth patrol (5–15 December) he was ordered to explore the inner waters around the Orkney Islands and engage any remaining Home Fleet units that had departed from Scapa Flow in the aftermath of Günther Prien's attack. Kretschmer targeted the Danish Scotia, a 2,400 GRT on 7 December. The ship was accompanied by three other vessels, but she was darkened and the blackout aroused Kretschmer's suspicions. Nineteen men were killed in the sinking and only two were saved. Following this patrol, he received the Iron Cross 1st Class (Eisernes Kreuz erster Klasse) on 17 December.

U-23 departed from Kiel on 8 January 1940 for its sixth war patrol and Schnee had been replaced by Oberleutnant zur See Hans-Dietrich von Tiesenhausen. The Norwegian Fredville, only 1,150 GRT was sunk on 11 January 1940 without warning. The single torpedo attack killed 11 men. Only five sailors survived. Kretschmer's next success came in the Inganess Bay, Kirkwall, where he attacked and sank the Danish 10,517 GRT tanker Danmark on 12 January 1940 while she lay at anchor. There were no deaths among the crew. Kretschmer returned to Wilhelmshaven on 15 January. Three days later he departed for his seventh war patrol. Another neutral Scandinavian ship was sunk. The Norwegian Varild 1,085 GRT was sunk east of the Shetland Islands. The attack was conducted with no warning, and consequently all 15 crewmen died. U-23 returned to port on 29 January. He departed from Wilhelmshaven for his eighth war patrol on 9 February.

On 18 February, Kretschmer sank the 1,300 ton British fleet destroyer Daring off the Pentland Firth while she was escorting convoy HN 12 from Norway. The destroyer crew lifted the black-out curtains, making the attack easy. A single torpedo was fired, then Kretschmer ordered a u-turn and sped away on the surface; the destroyers neither sighted him nor detected him with ASDIC. Kretschmer sighted the British submarine Thistle (N24) soon afterwards, and fired a second torpedo which missed. Thistle was sunk weeks later by U-4. 157 of the Daring crew were killed, including Commander Sydney Cooper. Only five survived. The next day, he sank Tiberton, 5,225 GRT, in the Moray Firth. All 33 men aboard died. Loch Maddy , 4,996 GRT, was sunk on 22 February. The ship had been torpedoed by U-57 and abandoned. Kretschmer returned to Wilhelmshaven on 25 February after 17 days at sea—his longest to date.

=== U-99: Battle of the Atlantic ===
On 2 April 1940, after eight patrols on U-23, Kretschmer was ordered to the Germaniawerft, the shipbuilding works in Kiel, for construction training of the new Type VIIB U-99. He commissioned U-99 on 18 April 1940 which was part of the 7th U-boat Flotilla. After two months' training and shakedown manoeuvres in German waters, Kretschmer took the boat into action on 18 June 1940. On 21 June, his ninth patrol, his boat was damaged by an Arado Ar 196 floatplane from Scharnhorst in the belief U-99 was a British submarine. U-99's first patrol ended in Wilhelmshaven on 25 June.

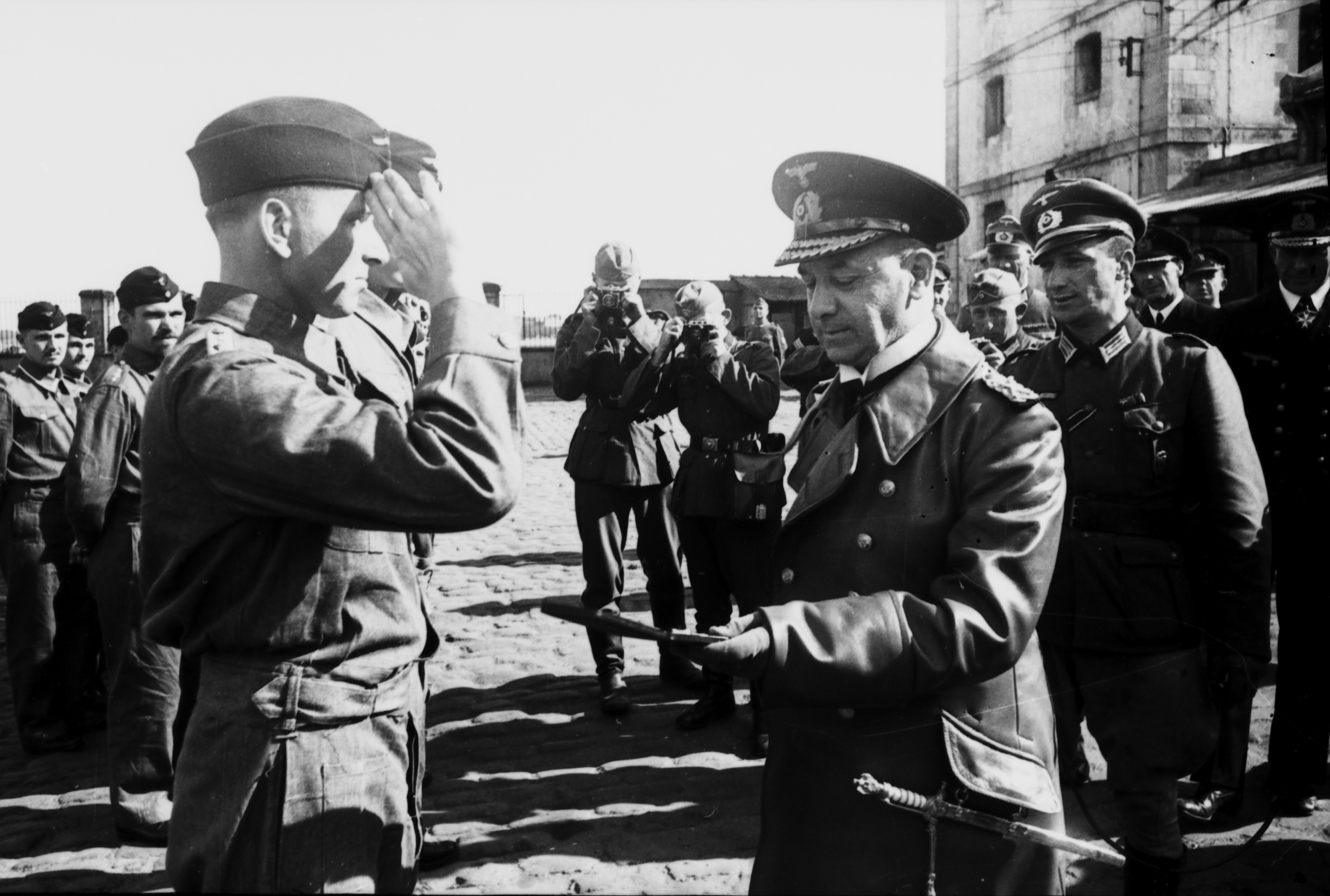
Kapitänleutnant Kretschmer receiving his Knight's Cross from the hands of Großadmiral Erich Raeder, August 1940

During U-99's first four patrols, Kretschmer commenced attacking convoys at night on the surface, sinking merchant ships with highly accurate shots, using only one torpedo per target ship. The quote "one torpedo ... one ship" is attributed to Kretschmer around this time. His particularly brazen and risky innovation was to execute these night surface attacks inside the convoy. Admiral Sir George Creasy considered the manoeuvre so dangerous he thought it had been done by mistake. Kretschmer's tenth patrol (27 June–21 July) yielded over 20,000 GRT. After sinking Magog— the submarine's first victim — Kretschmer gave the crew a bottle of brandy and directions to Ireland. Acts of compassion in submarine warfare were "selective and fickle", one historian wrote when describing Kretschmer's rescue of a lone man in a raft. Haunted by him, Kretschmer ordered the boat to backtrack until the survivor was found. They provided clothes and alcohol, then transferred him to a lifeboat at the first opportunity.

Among the victims was the Estonian ship, Merisaar, 2,126 GRT. Kretschmer captured the vessel, the only such ship seized by U-99. The crew abandoned ship and were questioned by Kretschmer. The German crew failed to sink the stationary vessel with torpedoes while the weather ruled out the use of the gun. A prize crew boarded to sail it to Bordeaux. The ship did not reach port. German aircraft bombed and sank it three days later. Kretschmer docked in Lorient on 21 July. The BdU acquired new bases along the French Atlantic coast after the Battle of France. A notable failure on the patrol occurred in the interception of HMS Manistee. Kretschmer attempted to sink the ship with gunfire, but return fire and the appearance of an aircraft forced him to submerge. Under water U-99 had no chance of catching her.

Four days later Kretschmer began his eleventh patrol which concluded on 5 August. This third patrol on U-99, took the boat into the North Atlantic, into the North Channel and west of Ireland. He sank four ships and damaged three. His greatest success was the sinking of Auckland Star, a 13,212 GRT ship on 28 July followed by another two totalling 12,811 GRT on 29 and 31 July. Kretschmer was guided onto convoy OB 191. The 28-ship convoy was poorly defended by a destroyer and a corvette. Kretschmer was presented with an opportunity to put his "one torpedo, one ship" mantra into practice. Kretschmer hit and sank the cargo ship Jersey City 70 nautical miles (130 kilometres; 81 miles) northwest of Tory Island while damaging three others, including the 10,973 GRT Strinda. The ships used barrels for ballast to prevent them sinking. The crew remained in lifeboats nearby for reboarding once the attack was over. Following his third war patrol with U-99, Kretschmer was awarded the Knight's Cross of the Iron Cross (Ritterkreuz des Eisernen Kreuzes) on 4 August. The presentation was made by Großadmiral Erich Raeder following his return to Lorient.

On U-99's fourth war patrol in September 1940, Kretschmer formed part of a wolfpack that struck against Convoy HX 72. The convoy suffered heavy losses while the U-boats escaped unscathed. Kretschmer sank one and damaged two–which he and Prien dispatched the following day. Joachim Schepke arrived in U-100 and sank seven. Heinrich Bleichrodt hit and sank two. 12 ships were sunk in total. Kretschmer's logbook recorded the chaos. It noted that the destroyers "did not know how to help" and busied themselves firing star shells on a moonlit night. The following month, Kretschmer formed part of the pack that attacked and devastated Convoy SC 7. Bleichrodt reported it and Dönitz succeeded in bringing a number of boats in on it. Kretschmer sank six and disabled a seventh. Kretschmer recommended his helmsman Stabsobersteuermann Heinrich Petersen for the Knight's Cross after twelve war patrols for saving U-99 from enemy detection. The nomination was approved on 5 November 1940. Petersen had served as Kretschmer's helmsman on every war patrol on both U-23 and U-99.

In November and December 1940 U-99 sank three British armed merchant cruisers (AMC), HMS Laurentic, HMS Patroclus and HMS Forfar. Laurentic and Patroclus were attacked on the night of 3/4 November. 51 men died aboard Laurentic, 367 survived. Patroclus lost 56 crew; 230 survived. Kretschmer was awarded the 6th Knight's Cross of the Iron Cross with Oak Leaves (Ritterkreuz des Eisernen Kreuzes mit Eichenlaub) on 4 November 1940. U-99 docked four days later, concluding Kretschmer's fourteenth patrol after just ten days at sea. Upon reaching port, he was summoned to Berlin to meet Raeder. He was given the opportunity to convey his opinions on the state of the U-boat war. Kretschmer purportedly confined his remarks to the lack of air support from the Luftwaffe, a point Raeder was fully aware of. Kretschmer then met Hitler at the Reich Chancellery and he repeated his opinions on the war situation. Hitler invited Kretschmer to sit in on a lunch meeting with Hitler and Vyacheslav Molotov, the Soviet Union's ambassador to the Third Reich. Kretschmer's thoughts on Hitler and the subsequent conference are not known.

Kretschmer departed for his fifteenth patrol on 27 November and returned on 12 December. In December Kretschmer tried to intercept Convoy HX 90 but encountered only stragglers. Forfar was one, and during the sinking HMS Viscount appeared, forcing Kretschmer to dive. He assumed most of the crew went down with the ship; but there were 159 survivors. 176 men died. Laurentic and Patroclus had been loaded with wooden barrels to increase buoyancy. It took nine torpedoes and one dud to sink them; the latter was sunk after it stopped to pick up survivors from the former. Kretschmer was forced to engage Patroclus with the deck gun when it appeared to resist the torpedo damage, but retreated when the ship fired back. A Short Sunderland appeared briefly, and Kretschmer was forced to accomplish the destruction of the ship with torpedoes, submerged. On 7 December 1940, Kretschmer sank the Dutch freighter Farmsum; the last success of the year. The ship was loaded with coal, set for Buenos Aires, Argentina. The ship sank slowly. Kretschmer learned its identity from frantic radio signals.

=== Defeat and capture ===
Several of Kretschmer's senior officers left the boat before the final patrol. Klaus Bargsten served aboard U-99 under Kretschmer, before being promoted to captain himself and becoming the sole survivor of U-521 on 2 June 1943.

On 22 February 1941 U-99 left Lorient for the final time. For 13 days Kretschmer sailed without success. U-99 tried in vain to assist Prien in U-47, against OB 290. Prien achieved several sinkings, Kretschmer did not; the pair was chased off by destroyers. Prien's reports were picked up by the Luftwaffe which sent Focke-Wulf Fw 200s from I. Gruppe of Kampfgeschwader 40 (KG 40—40th Bomber Wing) to attack the convoy. The air crews sank eight and damaged several more. Kretschmer continued to search for stragglers and found SS Holmlea. He fired a single torpedo that missed before he lost the ship in thick mist. Prien sank the ship the following day. Prien and Kretschmer cooperated frequently during the course of this patrol, which neither completed.

The operation against Convoy OB 293 proved disastrous for the Lorient group. Prien and Kretschmer, along with U-70 (Matz) and UA, attacked the convoy. The ships were protected by an escort group of two destroyers, Wolverine and Verity, and two corvettes, Arbutus and Camellia. As with the group that eventually sank Kretschmer ten days later, they were experienced and competent. Kretschmer attempted a surface night attack using his favourite tactic. On 7 March Kretschmer sank two ships from the convoy including the 20,638 GRT Terje Viken. Four ships were sunk, but two U-boats were sunk, one of which was U-47. Prien along with his crew disappeared, presumably in a depth charge attack. British reports of the action mention a large red glow appearing deep below the surface amid the depth charge explosions.

On 16 March 1941 Kretschmer attacked Convoy HX 112. Kretschmer sank all but one of the ships lost by the convoy. During a counterattack by the escorts U-99 was disabled after repeated depth charge attacks by the destroyers Walker and Vanoc. U-99 was driven down to 700 feet—beyond the recognised crush depth— before control was regained and the ballast tanks blown. Kretschmer surfaced and, under fire from the British vessels, scuttled his boat. Three of his men were lost, but Kretschmer and the remainder of U-99's crew were captured. That same day the British escorts scored another success against the Kriegsmarine when the noted U-boat skipper Joachim Schepke was killed aboard U-100, having been depth charged, rammed and sunk by Vanoc.

Kretschmer's usual standards of conduct were evident during the sinking of his boat. One signalman sent a message to the escorts "we are sinking" and the firing stopped. He then sent a message to BdU, "Two destroyers—depth charges—50,000 tons—Kretschmer." Kretschmer signalled Walker asking for rescue for his men, taking care to ensure as many left the submarine as possible, and assisted some of his crew towards the rescue nets hung from the British destroyer. Kretschmer's strength was evidently failing in the cold ocean. His own rescue was at the hands of a British sailor who climbed down the nets and plucked him from the water.

=== Prisoner of war ===
Kretschmer and his crew were landed in Liverpool. They were sent to Lime Street Station to be transported to London for interrogation. Kretschmer was taken separately, but his crew had to negotiate the streets of Liverpool and were subjected to missiles thrown by angry civilians. The city had been heavily bombed and was closely linked with the Atlantic war. He was transported to the London Cage, a facility where MI19 held valuable enemy prisoners. The building was located at number 8 Kensington Palace Gardens. Winston Churchill disclosed the capture of Kretschmer to the House of Commons on 21 March. German radio acknowledged the capture and the death of Schepke. Prien's demise was not disclosed. German propagandists feared the triple loss might be too damaging to morale.

Once in London, Royal Navy interrogators questioned the crew. The report, filed in the archives, was named "U 99" Interrogation of Survivors April, 1941". The British report noted of Kretschmer, "His political views were less extremely Nazi than had been assumed. On seeing the craters of a stick of bombs near Buckingham Palace he was genuinely shocked that an attempt had so obviously been made by his countrymen to bomb the Palace. He spoke English quite well, though he lacked practice. His whole demeanour was calm and quiet, and he seemed anxious to be friendly; he was also less suspicious of British Officers than was his First Lieutenant. Kretschmer stated that he was unmarried."

Of his personality and view of the war it stated, "He gave the impression of being a quiet, deliberate man, and looked more like a student than a U-Boat Captain. He prided himself on being able to take advantage of whatever the passing moment offered and made no elaborate plans for attacking convoys. He admitted that he had become weary of the war some time ago, and latterly had got no satisfaction from sinking ship after ship."

Following his capture, Kretschmer spent almost seven years as a prisoner of war (POW) in the hands of the British, initially at No 1 POW camp Grizedale Hall in Cumbria. In March 1942, the prisoners were transported to Bowmanville Camp near Lake Ontario in Canada. During his captivity, Kretschmer was promoted in rank to Korvettenkapitän (Lieutenant-Commander) on 19 March 1941, effective as of 1 March 1941, and to Fregattenkapitän (Commander) on 1 September 1944. He was awarded the Knight's Cross of the Iron Cross with Oak Leaves and Swords (Ritterkreuz des Eisernen Kreuzes mit Eichenlaub und Schwertern) on 26 December 1941. He was the fifth member of the German armed forces to be so honored.

On 27 August 1941, U-570 was captured by the Royal Navy. The officers were also taken to the prisoner-of-war camp at Grizedale Hall. Kretschmer was senior officer at the camp. An illegal "Court of Honour" was convened and headed by Kretschmer. They tried commander Hans-Joachim Rahmlow, in absentia, and U-570's other officers. Rahmlow and his second-in-command, Bernhard Berndt, were found "guilty of cowardice". The other two officers were "acquitted". On the night of 18/19 October, Berndt escaped from the camp. A detachment of the Home Guard fatally shot him. Allied courts and Rahmlow sought justice against Kretschmer after the war, but he was never vigorously pursued for trial for his role in the death of Berndt. Kretschmer was also involved in a second illegal court of honour hearing against the commander of U-501. Its commander, Hugo Förster, was repatriated to Germany and committed suicide before the end of the war.

In 1943, the German navy tried to rescue him in Operation Kiebitz but that daring plan (later dramatized in the novel The Bowmanville Break and the film, The McKenzie Break) failed. Kretschmer was released from captivity on 31 December 1947, and returned to Germany.

== Postwar career, and later life ==
After the war, Kretschmer initially studied law and, in 1952, passed the first state examination in law before the Higher Regional Court (OLG) of Schleswig. He also worked as an interpreter. Furthermore, he served as the first president of the newly formed German Naval Association (Deutscher Marinebund). In 1948, he married Dr. med. Luise-Charlotte Mohnsen-Hinrichs, née Bruns, the widow of Wehrmacht medical officer Oberarzt Dr. med. Hans-Eggert Mohnssen-Hinrichs (b. 7 March 1910 in Kiel; † 21 September 1943 in Bastia).

In 1955, Donald McIntyre returned Kretschmer's binoculars, which he had kept in 1941. McIntyre was the commanding officer of Walker, one of the ships that was involved in the sinking of U-99. At the time, Kretschmer was president of the Deutscher Marinebund, a member club of the International Maritime Confederation.

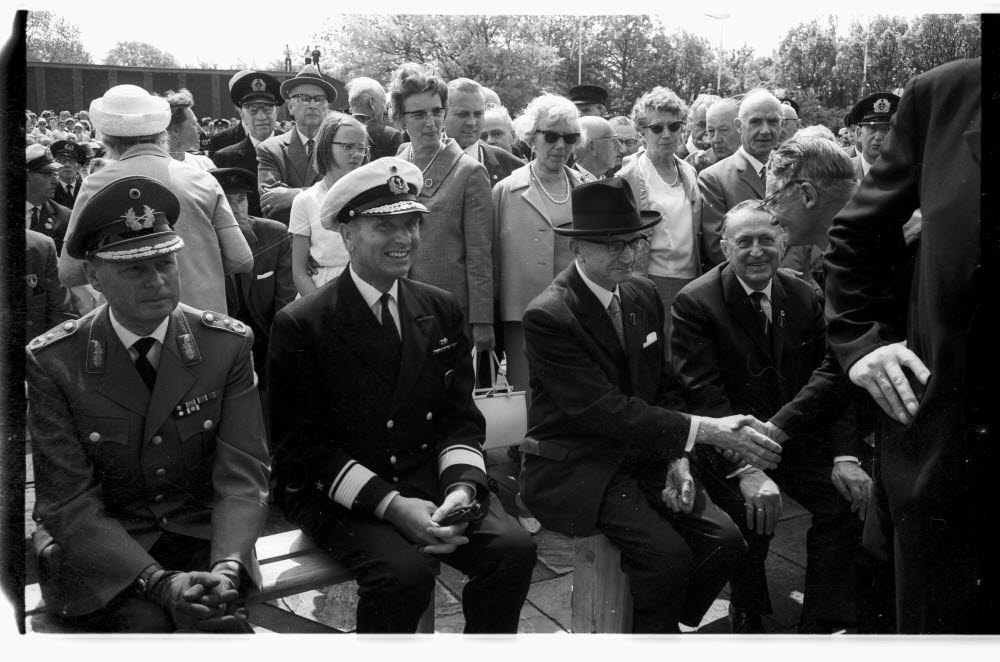
Flotillenadmiral Kretschmer in 1966

On 1 December 1955, Kretschmer joined West Germany's navy, at the time named the Bundesmarine (Federal Navy), holding the rank of Fregattenkapitän (Commander). He participated in the second officers' training course held at the former NS-Ordensburg Sonthofen. (Note: The Ordensburg Sonthofen was later renamed Generaloberst-Beck-Kaserne.) There, he became inspection group leader at the acceptance organization. (Note: inspection group leader at the acceptance organization—Prüfgruppenleiter bei der Annahmeorganisation) On 16 June 1956, he was tasked with the creation of 1. Geleitgeschwader (1st Escort Squadron) which he commanded from 3 January to 15 October 1957. He then attended a training course (16 October 1957 – 28 February 1958) for amphibious forces in the United States.

From 1 March to 31 October 1958, Kretschmer served as Admiralstabsoffizier (Asto—officer of the admiralty staff) with the Fleet Command. On 1 November 1958, he was transferred to the position of commander of the Bundesmarine's Amphibische Streitkräfte ("amphibious forces"), a position he held until 15 January 1962. During this command, he was promoted to Kapitän zur See (captain at sea/captain) on 12 December 1958. On 16 January 1962, Kretschmer was appointed head of the department for naval task force training and naval tactics with the Führungsstab der Marine (Navy Staff) with the Federal Ministry of Defence. (Note: head of the department for naval task force training and naval tactics—Leiter des Referates Verbandsausbildung und Seetaktik) On 28 August 1963, he was transferred to the NATO Defense College in Paris. Kretschmer served in this function until 18 June 1964 when he was appointed chief-of-staff of the Befehlshaber der Seestreitkräfte der Nordsee (German national Commander Naval Forces North Sea). On 1 June 1965, he was promoted to Flottillenadmiral (flotilla admiral/Commodore/Rear Admiral), a rank which he initially held on probation. That day, he was made chief-of-staff of the NATO command COMNAVBALTAP at Kiel, taking command on 15 June. Six months later, on 15 December, he officially became Flottillenadmiral. His command ended on 31 March 1969. The next day, Kretschmer was transferred to the Amt für Militärkunde (Department of Military Studies), retiring on 30 September 1970.

While on holiday in Bavaria in the summer of 1998, Kretschmer died in an accident while boating on the Danube to celebrate his 50th wedding anniversary, at the age of 86. He was on a holiday cruise from Regensburg to Budapest when he tried climbing some almost vertical steps. A fall caused fatal head injuries. He died on 5 August 1998 at a hospital in Straubing. His body was cremated, and following a funeral ceremony at Hinte, his ashes were scattered at sea.

== Summary of military career ==
According to Dixon, Kretschmer sank 47 ships of 274,418 GRT, further damaging three ships of 37,965 GRT. Stockert lists him with 46 ships sunk, totaling 273,073 GRT, and damaging five ships of 37,965 GRT. Busch and Röll state that he sunk 47 ships of 274,418 GRT plus five ships damaged of 37,965 GRT.

=== Awards ===
- Wehrmacht Long Service Award 4th Class (2 October 1936)
- Memel Medal (26 October 1939)
- Iron Cross (1939)
  - 2nd Class (17 October 1939)
  - 1st Class (17 December 1939)
- U-boat War Badge (1939) (9 November 1939)
- Sudetenland Medal (20 December 1939)
- Knight's Cross of the Iron Cross with Oak Leaves and Swords
  - Knight's Cross on 4 August 1940 as Kapitänleutnant and commander of U-99
  - 6th Oak Leaves on 4 November 1940 as Kapitänleutnant and commander of U-99
  - 5th Swords on 26 December 1941 as Korvettenkapitän and commander of U-99

=== Promotions ===
==== Reichsmarine ====
- Offiziersanwärter (officer cadet) – 1 April 1930
- Seekadett (naval cadet) – 9 October 1930
- Fähnrich zur See (midshipman) – 1 January 1932
- Oberfähnrich zur See (senior midshipman) – 1 April 1934
- Leutnant zur See (acting sub-lieutenant) – 1 October 1934

==== Kriegsmarine ====
- Oberleutnant zur See (sub-lieutenant) – 1 June 1936
- Kapitänleutnant (captain lieutenant/lieutenant) – 1 June 1939
- Korvettenkapitän (corvette captain/lieutenant commander) – 19 March 1941, effective as of 1 March 1941
- Fregattenkapitän (frigate captain/commander) – 1 September 1944

==== Bundesmarine ====
- Fregattenkapitän (frigate captain/commander) – 1 December 1955
- Kapitän zur See (captain at sea/captain) – 12 December 1958
- Flottillenadmiral auf Probe (flotilla admiral on probation) – 1 June 1965
- Flottillenadmiral (flotilla admiral) – 15 December 1965
