= Convoy OB 293 =

Convoy during naval battles of the Second World War

- Part of World War II
Date	2 March 1941 – 8 March 1941
Location	Western Approaches
Result	Allied victory

Belligerents
Germany	United Kingdom

Commanders and leaders
Admiral Karl Dönitz	convoy: escort: LtCdr JM Rowlands

Strength
4 U-boats	37 ships 4 escorts

Casualties and losses
1 U-boat sunk 1 damaged 1 missing	2 ships sunk 3 damaged

OB 293 was a North Atlantic convoy which ran during the battle of the Atlantic in World War II. It was notable for seeing the loss to the Kriegsmarine (KM) of U-47, with her commander KL Günther Prien, the person responsible for the sinking of HMS Royal Oak two years previously.

== Prelude ==
OB 293 was a west-bound convoy of 37 ships, either in ballast or carrying trade goods, and sailed from Liverpool on 2 March 1941 bound for ports in North America.

It was escorted by an escort group of two destroyers, Wolverine and Verity, and two corvettes, Arbutus and Camellia. They were led by LtCdr Rowlands of Wolverine, which would stay with them till they left the Western Approaches. (At this stage of the campaign escort groups were too scarce to provide "end-to-end" cover).

On 6 March 1941 the convoy was sighted by U-47 commanded by Prien. After sending a sighting report he set to shadowing the convoy, being joined throughout the day by three other boats. They were U-99 (Kretschmer), U-70 (Matz) and UA (Eckermann).

== Action ==
The wolf pack launched its attack on the night of March 6–7.

In the early hours of 7 March U-99 slipped into the convoy from ahead, to attack on the surface. She torpedoed and sank the tanker Athelbeach, already damaged by U-47, and the whale factory ship Terje Viken. U-70 damaged a British tanker, Delilian, and a Dutch tanker, Mijdrecht. The latter rounded on U-70 and attempted to ram, forcing U-70 to crash-dive to escape. UA hit a freighter, but did not sink her.

The response of the escorts was swift and effective. The U-boats were subjected to a fierce bombardment as the warships chased down contacts. Over 100 depth charges were expended over a five-hour period. UA was damaged but was able to escape. U-99 only escaped by diving deep and waiting out the attack. U-70 was damaged in the onslaught and forced to the surface, where she was fired on and sunk by the corvettes Camellia and Arbutus.

U-47 avoided damage and was able to stay in contact with the convoy, sending further reports and requesting reinforcements. They had also been able to torpedo Terje Viken, which was straggling after being damaged, though she still remained afloat. The escorts attempted to bring her to port, but she finally sank on the 14th. Her loss was credited to both U-99 and U-47.

At about 1am on the night of March 7–8, Wolverine sighted a U-boat on the surface which she identified as U-47. She and Verity attacked, and after four hours the U-boat was driven to the surface within yards of Wolverine, before diving again. The destroyer sent down a pattern of depth charges and was rewarded with an underwater explosion, marked by an orange glow, and flames that broke the surface.

== Aftermath ==
Wolverine was credited with destroying U-47, and this featured in the official record until the late 1990s. However, after reviewing the available records modern historians regard this attack as being directed against UA, which was badly damaged, but survived to reach port.

No conclusion can be reached about the fate of U-47, and it is thought likely to be the result of a diving accident.

The success of the defence of OB 293, with the loss of Prien, coupled with the successful defence of Convoy HX 112, and the loss of two more aces, Kretschmer and Schepke, one week later, marks a minor turning point in the Atlantic campaign.

== Ships involved ==
=== Merchant ships ===
Merchant ships in convoy
Name	Flag	Tonnage (GRT)	Notes
Athelbeach (1931)	United Kingdom	6,568	Sunk by U-99; 7 dead. 37 survivors.
Basil (1928)	United Kingdom	4,913	
Bayano (1917)	United Kingdom	6,815	Vice-Admiral Sir FM Austin KBE CB (Commodore)
Capsa (1931)	United Kingdom	8,229	
Cardium (1931)	United Kingdom	8,236	
City of Baroda (1918)	United Kingdom	7,129	
Delilian (1923)	United Kingdom	6,423	Damaged by U-70 & towed to Clyde
Dunaff Head (1918)	United Kingdom	5,258	Damaged by UA; 5 dead & 39 survivors.
Eastgate (1940)	United Kingdom	5,032	
Embassage (1935)	United Kingdom	4,954	
Empire Attendant (1921)	United Kingdom	7,524	
Empire Wildebeeste (1918)	United Kingdom	5,631	
Jade (1938)	United Kingdom	930	
Kelbergen (1914)	Netherlands	4,823	
Korsholm (1925)	Sweden	2,647	
Leerdam (1921)	Netherlands	8,815	
Leiesten (1930)	Norway	6,118	
Loreto (1913)	United Kingdom	6,682	
Mercier (1915)	Belgium	7,886	
Michael J Goulandris (1921)	Greece	6,669	
Mijdrecht (1931)	Netherlands	7,493	Damaged by U-70
Miralda (1936)	United Kingdom	8,013	
New Brunswick (1919)	United Kingdom	6,529	
New Westminster City (1929)	United Kingdom	4,747	
Peru (1916)	United Kingdom	6,569	
Port Caroline (1919)	United Kingdom	8,263	
Puck (1935)	Poland	1,065	
Sacramento Valley (1924)	United Kingdom	4,573	
Terje Viken (1936)	United Kingdom	20,638	Sunk by U-99; 2 dead and 105 survivors.
Tiradentes (1922)	Norway	4,960	
Tregarthen (1936)	United Kingdom	5,201	
Ulysses (1918)	Netherlands	2,666	
Vernon City (1929)	United Kingdom	4,748	
Viking Star (1920)	United Kingdom	6,445	
Waroonga (1914)	United Kingdom	9,365	
White Crest (1928)	United Kingdom	4,365	
Woensdrecht (1926)	Netherlands	4,668	
Yselhaven (1921)	Netherlands	4,802	

=== Escorts ===
Escort ships
Name	Class	Type	Date joined	Date departed	Notes
HMS Arbutus	Flower	Corvette	2 March	7 March	attacked and sank U-70, 7 March
HMS Beverley	Town	Destroyer	4 March	8 March	
HMS Camellia	Flower	Corvette	2 March	7 March	attacked and sank U-70, 7 March
HMS Chelsea	Town	Destroyer	2 March	7 March	
HMS Verity	V and W	Destroyer	2 March	7 March	attacked and damaged UA, 7 March
HMS Wolverine	V and W	Destroyer	2 March	7 March	attacked and damaged UA, 7 March

=== U-boats ===
U-boats
Name	Type	Navy/Commander	Success	Fate
U-37	IX	KL Nicolai Clausen	N/A	Did not make contact
U-47	VIIB	KK Günther Prien	hit Terje Viken	lost, cause unknown; originally credited to d/c attacks by Wolverine, Verity
U-70	VIIC	KL Joachim Matz	hit Athelbeach hit Delilan, hit Mijdrecht	rammed by Mijdrecht, attacked and sunk by Arbutus, Camellia
U-99	VIIB	KK Otto Kretschmer	hit Terje Viken (sank later), sank Athelbeach	
UA	UA	FK Hans Eckermann	damaged Dunaff Head	attacked by Wolverine, Verity; damaged and force to return to base
