= List of shipwrecks in March 1941 =

The list of shipwrecks in March 1941 includes all ships sunk, foundered, grounded, or otherwise lost during March 1941.

== 1 March ==
List of shipwrecks: 1 March 1941
Ship	State	Description
Cadillac	United Kingdom	World War II: Convoy HX 109: The 12,062 GRT tanker on a voyage from Aruba for Avonmouth with a cargo of aviation spirit, was torpedoed and sunk in the Atlantic Ocean 100 nautical miles (190 km) south west of the Bishop Rock (59°44′N 11°16′W) by German submarine U-552 (Kriegsmarine) with the loss of 37 of the 42 people on board. Survivors were rescued by HMS Malcolm (Royal Navy).
Empire Simba	United Kingdom	World War II: The cargo ship was bombed and damaged in the Atlantic Ocean (52°21′N 5°23′W) by a Heinkel He 111 aircraft of Kampfgeschwader 27, Luftwaffe and was abandoned by her crew. She was towed to Liverpool, Lancashire, arriving on 4 March. She was subsequently repaired and returned to service.
Huldra	Germany	World War II: The cargo ship struck a mine and sank at Hustadvika, Norway.
HMT Plough Boy	Royal Navy	World War II: The minesweeping drifter (102 GRT) struck three mines off Malta and was severely damaged with the loss of one crew member. She was beached to prevent her sinking and was later repaired.
Rotula	Netherlands	World War II: Convoy SC 22: The 7,981 GRT tanker on a trip from Curaçao for Swansea with a cargo of aviation spirit, was bombed and damaged in the Atlantic Ocean (52°15′N 5°33′W) by Heinkel He 111 aircraft of Kampfgeschwader 27, Luftwaffe with the loss of sixteen of her 48 crew. She was later scuttled by Armana (Royal Navy).
HMT St. Donats	Royal Navy	The naval trawler (349 GRT) collided with HMS Cotswold (Royal Navy) and sank in the North Sea off the mouth of the Humber (53°29′N 1°01′E) just after midnight on the 2nd. There were no casualties.

== 2 March ==
List of shipwrecks: 2 March 1941
Ship	State	Description
Augvald	Norway	World War II: Convoy HX 109: The cargo ship (4,811 GRT) on a trip from Baltimore for Hull with a cargo of steel, scrap iron and tractors, straggled behind the convoy. She was torpedoed and sunk in the Atlantic Ocean 150 nautical miles (280 km) north west of Loch Ewe (59°30′N 7°30′W) by U-147 (Kriegsmarine) with the loss of 29 of her 30 crew. The sole survivor was rescued by HMS Pimpernel (Royal Navy) after spending 11 days on a raft.
Castlehill	United Kingdom	World War II: The cargo ship (690 GRT) was bombed and sunk in the Bristol Channel off Minehead, Somerset by Heinkel He 111 aircraft of Kampfgeschwader 27, Luftwaffe with the loss of 9 crew and one gunner. There was only one survivor.
Madge Wildfire	United Kingdom	The cargo ship (372 GRT) ran aground at Congress Point, Derbyhaven, Isle of Man and was wrecked. Her 11 crew all survived. She was on a voyage from Liverpool, Lancashire to Glasgow, Renfrewshire.
Pacific	United Kingdom	World War II: Convoy HX 109: The cargo ship (6,034 GRT) on a trip from New York for Grangemouth with a cargo of steel scrap, was torpedoed and sunk in the Atlantic Ocean 180 nautical miles (330 km) west south west of the Faroe Islands by U-95 (Kriegsmarine) with the loss of 34 of her 35 crew. The sole survivor was rescued by the fishing trawler Dora ( Iceland).
Simaloer	Netherlands	World War II: The cargo ship (6,533 GRT) was bombed and set on fire in the Atlantic Ocean (56°40′N 10°46′W) by Focke-Wulf Fw 200 aircraft of Kampfgeschwader 40, Luftwaffe. Two crew were killed. The 39 survivors abandoned ship and were rescued three days later by the trawler Baldur ( Iceland). The wreck was seen floating on March 4 but later sank.

== 3 March ==
List of shipwrecks: 3 March 1941
Ship	State	Description
HMT Cobbers	Royal Navy	World War II: The Castle-class naval trawler (275 GRT) was bombed and sunk off Lowestoft, Suffolk, by Luftwaffe aircraft with the loss of her captain and ten of her fifteen crew.
Knight of Malta	United Kingdom	The cargo ship ran aground in the Mediterranean Sea 2 nautical miles (3.7 km) west of Ras Azzaz, Egypt. There were no casualties. Salvage was abandoned on 10 March following air attacks on the ships dispatched.
HMS MGB 12	Royal Navy	World War II: The MGB 6-class motor gun boat struck a mine in the Bristol Channel off Milford Haven, Pembrokeshire. She was taken in tow but sank on 6 March.
Port Townsville	United Kingdom	World War II: The ship was bombed and damaged in the Atlantic Ocean (52°05′N 5°24′W) by Heinkel He 111 aircraft of Kampfgeschwader 27, Luftwaffe. Two of the 76 people on board were killed. She sank the next day.
HMS Tiny	Royal Navy	World War II: The armed yacht was bombed and sunk at Sunderland, County Durham by Luftwaffe aircraft.

== 4 March ==
List of shipwrecks: 4 March 1941
Ship	State	Description
Andø	Norway	World War II: The coaster was sunk at Lofoten, either by Fleet Air Arm aircraft or by demolition charges laid by British troops.
Anonity	United Kingdom	World War II: The coaster struck a mine and sank in the North Sea 1.5 nautical miles (2.8 km) south east of Skegness Pier, Lincolnshire with the loss of four of her six crew.
Bernhard Schulte	Germany	World War II: Operation Claymore: The cargo ship was shelled and sunk in the Norwegian Sea off the Lofoten Islands, Norway by HMS Tartar (Royal Navy). She was later raised and repaired.
Coburg	Germany	World War II: The cargo ship was intercepted off Italian Somaliland (8°40′N 61°25′E) by a Supermarine Walrus aircraft from HMAS Canberra (Royal Australian Navy) and was scuttled. Her crew were rescued by HMAS Canberra and HMNZS Leander (Royal New Zealand Navy).
Eilenau	Germany	World War II: Operation Claymore: The cargo ship was sunk in the Norwegian Sea off the Lofoten Islands, Norway.
Elbing	Kriegsmarine	World War II: Operation Claymore: The collier was shelled and set on fire in the Norwegian Sea off the Lofoten Islands by HMS Tartar (Royal Navy) and was beached. She was later repaired and returned to service.
Felix Heumann	Germany	World War II: Operation Claymore: The cargo ship was sunk in the Norwegian Sea off the Lofoten Islands. She was refloated in 1947, repaired and entered Norwegian service in 1949 as Bydgøy.
Gumbinnen	Germany	World War II: Operation Claymore: The cargo ship was shelled and sunk in the Norwegian Sea off the Lofoten Islands by HMS Tartar (Royal Navy). She was later raised and repaired
Hamburg	Germany	World War II: Operation Claymore: The cargo ship was shelled and sunk in the Norwegian Sea off the Lofoten Islands by HMS Tartar (Royal Navy).
Ketty Brøvig	Germany	World War II: The captured Norwegian tanker was intercepted off Italian Somaliland (8°40′N 61°25′E) by HMAS Canberra (Royal Australian Navy) and HMNZS Leander (Royal New Zealand Navy). She was scuttled by her crew, who were rescued by the Allied warships.
Krebs	Kriegsmarine	World War II: Operation Claymore: The patrol boat was sunk by gunfire from HMS Somali (Royal Navy) in the Norwegian Sea off the Lofoten Islands.
Mira	Norway	World War II: Operation Claymore: The cargo ship was shelled and sunk in the Norwegian Sea off the Lofoten Islands by HMS Bedouin (Royal Navy). Two people were killed.
Pasajes	Germany	World War II: Operation Claymore: The cargo ship was shelled and sunk in the Norwegian Sea off the Lofoten Islands by HMS Tartar (Royal Navy).

== 5 March ==
List of shipwrecks: 5 March 1941
Ship	State	Description
Colomba Lofaro	Italy	World War II: The 897 GRT coaster on a trip from Trapani for Crotone with a cargo of sulphur, was torpedoed and sunk while anchored at Melito di Porto Salvo (37°45′N 15°46′E) by HMS Triumph (Royal Navy). There were four dead and four wounded.
Marzamemi	Italy	World War II: The 958 GRT coaster on a trip from Trapani for Crotone with a cargo of sulphur, was torpedoed and sunk while anchored at Melito di Porto Salvo (37°45′N 15°46′E) by HMS Triumph (Royal Navy). There were no casualties.
Murjek	Sweden	World War II: The cargo ship was torpedoed and sunk in the Atlantic Ocean west north west of Rockall, Inverness-shire by U-95 (Kriegsmarine) with the loss of all 31 crew.
S70	Kriegsmarine	World War II: The Type 1939/40 Schnellboot was sunk by a mine.
Silverstone	United Kingdom	World War II: The tug struck a mine and sank in the River Medway 3 nautical miles (5.6 km) upstream of Rochester Bridge, Kent with the loss of all hands. Silverstone was towing the barges Cestone, Rockstone, Sandstone and Stonecurb (all United Kingdom), two of which sank.

== 6 March ==
List of shipwrecks: 6 March 1941
Ship	State	Description
Anfitrite	Regia Marina	World War II: The submarine was sunk in the Aegean Sea (34°55′N 23°45′E) by HMS Greyhound (Royal Navy). There were seven dead and 43 survivors.
Empire Sambar	United Kingdom	The Design 1015 ship was damaged by an explosion in her engine room at sea. She was towed in to a port. Subsequently repaired and returned to service as Empire Beaver.
HMT Keryado	Royal Navy	World War II: The naval trawler struck a mine in the English Channel and sank 10 nautical miles (19 km) south of Brighton, Sussex with the loss of nine of her crew.
Mexico	Norway	World War II: Convoy FS 247: The tanker struck a mine and sank in the North Sea (51°53′N 1°37′E) with the loss of ten of her 33 crew. Survivors were rescued by HMS Codrington (Royal Navy). The partially sunk wreck was dispersed in 1946.
Mouse	United Kingdom	World War II: The echo sounding boat was sunk by the explosion of a mine at Falmouth, Cornwall.
Queen Wasp	United Kingdom	World War II: The barge was sunk by the explosion of a mine at Falmouth.
Sun VII	Royal Navy	World War II: The tug struck a mine and sank in the Thames Estuary with the loss of five of her crew.

== 7 March ==
List of shipwrecks: 7 March 1941
Ship	State	Description
Adolphe Urban	Belgium	The cargo ship was last reported in the Mumbles Roads, Glamorgan, United Kingdom, en route to Drogheda, County Louth, Ireland. No further trace, except for a lifeboat that washed up at Kilrush, County Clare, Ireland on 26 March. Lost with all hands.
Athelbeach	United Kingdom	World War II: Convoy OB 293: The tanker was torpedoed and damaged in the Atlantic Ocean (60°30′N 13°30′W) by U-70. She was then torpedoed, shelled and sunk by U-99 (both Kriegsmarine) with the loss of seven of her 44 crew. Survivors were rescued by HMS Camellia (Royal Navy).
Boulderpool	United Kingdom	World War II: Convoy FS 429: The cargo ship (4,805 GRT) was torpedoed in the North Sea (52°58′13″N 1°28′40″E) by S-61 (Kriegsmarine). She broke in two and the bow section sank. The stern section was beached on Scroby Sands, Norfolk (52°37′58″N 1°47′52″E). Her crew were rescued. The stern section was subsequently dispersed by explosives.
Corduff	United Kingdom	World War II: Convoy FN 426: The cargo ship (2,345 GRT) was torpedoed and sunk in the North Sea off Cromer, Norfolk (52°52′20″N 1°40′07″E) by S-28 (Kriegsmarine). At the time of the attack, fourteen of the 23 crew abandoned ship via the ships lifeboat, leaving aboard seven dead and two badly injured who were later rescued and taken prisoner by the Germans. The fourteen crew members in the lifeboat were later picked up by the Cromer lifeboat H F Bailey.
Delilian	United Kingdom	World War II: Convoy OB 293: The cargo ship was torpedoed and damaged in the Atlantic Ocean (60°28′N 13°38′W) by U-70 (Kriegsmarine) and was abandoned by her 68 crew. She was later reboarded. Delilian was subsequently repaired, and returned to service in May 1941.
Dotterel	United Kingdom	World War II: Convoy FN 426: The cargo ship (1,385 GRT) was torpedoed and damaged in the North Sea off Southwold, Suffolk by S-29 (Kriegsmarine). Eight of her 27 crew were lost. Survivors were rescued by HMS Sheldrake (Royal Navy). Three crew of the latter drowned trying to board the steamer. She was taken in tow but drifted ashore and ran aground at 52°41′N 1°59′E, and was later declared a total loss.
Flashlight	United Kingdom	World War II: The coaster was bombed and sunk in the North Sea (53°39′N 0°49′E) by Luftwaffe aircraft. Her crew were rescued.
Kenton	United Kingdom	World War II: Convoy FS 429: The cargo ship (1,047 GRT) was torpedoed in the North Sea off Cromer by S-31 (Kriegsmarine). Four of her crew were killed and the survivors abandoned her in lifeboats. She ran aground at (52°57′N 1°30′E), was later found to have broke her back and was declared a total loss.
Manuel Arnús	Spain	The cargo ship was driven ashore at Veracruz, Mexico. She was refloated in November and sold for use as a target ship.
Mentor	Greece	World War II: The cargo ship was torpedoed and sunk in the Atlantic Ocean (59°30′N 25°00′W) by U-37 (Kriegsmarine) with the loss of seven of her 29 crew.
HM MTB 28	Royal Navy	The Thornycroft 73-foot-class motor torpedo boat was destroyed by fire at Portsmouth, Hampshire.
Rye	United Kingdom	World War II: Convoy FN 426: The cargo ship (1,048 GRT) was torpedoed and sunk in the North Sea off Cromer by S-27 (Kriegsmarine) with the loss of all 24 hands, including 2 gunners.
Terje Viken	United Kingdom	World War II: Convoy OB 293: The whaler was torpedoed and damaged in the Atlantic Ocean (60°00′N 12°50′W) by U-99 (Kriegsmarine) with the loss of two of her 107 crew. Survivors were rescued by HMS Hurricane (Royal Navy). Terje Viken was scuttled on 14 March by three Royal Navy ships.
U-70	Kriegsmarine	World War II: The Type VIIC submarine was depth charged and sunk in the Atlantic Ocean by HMS Arbutus and HMS Camellia (both Royal Navy) with the loss of 20 of her 45 crew. Survivors were taken on board the corvettes as prisoners of war.

== 8 March ==
List of shipwrecks: 8 March 1941
Ship	State	Description
HMS Dart	Royal Navy	World War II: The auxiliary minesweeper struck a mine and sank in the Suez Canal with the loss of two of her four crew.
Dunaff Head	United Kingdom	World War II: Convoy OB 293: The cargo ship was torpedoed and sunk in the Atlantic Ocean (60°33′N 18°50′W) by UA (Kriegsmarine) with the loss of six of her crew.
Francis Dawson	United Kingdom	The cargo ship caught fire at Halifax, Nova Scotia, Canada and was declared a constructive total loss. She was repaired, and returned to service as Empire Tyne.
George E. Klinck	United States	The schooner foundered in the Atlantic Ocean off Cape Hatteras, North Carolina, in a gale. Her eight crew were rescued by the aircraft carrier USS Wasp (United States Navy).
Harmodius	United Kingdom	World War II: Convoy SL 67: The cargo ship was torpedoed and sunk in the Atlantic Ocean (20°35′N 20°40′W) by U-105 (Kriegsmarine) with the loss of fourteen of her 75 crew. Survivors were rescued by HMS Faulknor and HMS Forester (both Royal Navy).
Hindpool	United Kingdom	World War II: Convoy SL 67: The cargo ship (4,897 GRT) was torpedoed and sunk in the Atlantic Ocean (20°51′N 20°32′W) by U-124 (Kriegsmarine) with the loss of 28 of her 40 crew. Survivors were rescued by HMS Faulknor (Royal Navy) and Guido (United Kingdom).
Lahore	United Kingdom	World War II: Convoy SL 67: The cargo ship was torpedoed and sunk in the Atlantic Ocean (21°03′N 20°38′W) by U-124 (Kriegsmarine). Her 82 crew were rescued by HMS Forester (Royal Navy).
Nardana	United Kingdom	World War II: Convoy SL 67: The cargo ship was torpedoed and sunk in the Atlantic Ocean (20°51′N 20°32′W) by U-124 (Kriegsmarine) with the loss of nineteen of her 107 crew. Survivors were rescued by HMS Faulknor and HMS Forester (both Royal Navy).
Norman Queen	United Kingdom	World War II: Convoy FN 426: The coaster (957 GRT) was torpedoed and sunk in the North Sea off Happisburgh, Norfolk by S-102 (Kriegsmarine) with the loss of fourteen lives, 12 crew and 2 gunners. A survivor was taken as a prisoner of war.
Nurgis	Norway	World War II: The coaster was bombed and sunk in the English Channel 7 nautical miles (13 km) west by north of The Lizard, Cornwall, United Kingdom by Heinkel He 111 aircraft of Kampfgeschwader 2, Luftwaffe. Her fourteen crew were rescued by Arthur Wright (United Kingdom).
Prins Frederik Hendrik	Netherlands	World War II: The cargo ship was bombed and sunk in St George's Channel (52°20′N 5°37′W) by Heinkel He 111 aircraft of Kampfgeschwader 27, Luftwaffe with the loss of eight of her crew.
Tielbank	United Kingdom	World War II: Convoy SL 67: The cargo ship was torpedoed and sunk in the Atlantic Ocean (20°51′N 20°32′W) by U-124 (Kriegsmarine) with the loss of four of her 66 crew. Survivors were rescued by HMS Forester (Royal Navy).
Togstоn	United Kingdom	World War II: Convoy FN 426: The cargo ship (957 GRT) was torpedoed and sunk in the North Sea off Cromer, Norfolk by S-102 (Kriegsmarine) with the loss of eight of her crew.

== 9 March ==
List of shipwrecks: 9 March 1941
Ship	State	Description
Capo Vita	Italy	World War II: The 5,683 GRT cargo ship travelling in a convoy from Naples for Tripoli witha cargo of ammunition, was torpedoed, exploded and sank in the Gulf of Hammamet 25 nautical miles (46 km) north of Kuriat (36°09′N 11°07′E) by HMS Utmost (Royal Navy). There were no survivors.
HMT Gulfoss	Royal Navy	World War II: The naval trawler struck a mine and sank in the English Channel off Hastings, Sussex with the loss of ten of her crew.
HMT Hatsuse	Royal Navy	World War II: The naval trawler struck a mine and was damaged in the English Channel 1.2 nautical miles (2.2 km) south of Penlee Point, Cornwall. She was beached in Cawsand Bay. HMT Hatsuse was refloated on 11 March. She was repaired and returned to service.
Marathon	Greece	World War II: The cargo ship was shelled and sunk in the South Atlantic (approximately 21°N 25°W) by Scharnhorst (Kriegsmarine). Her 38 crew were taken as prisoners of war.

== 10 March ==
List of shipwrecks: 10 March 1941
Ship	State	Description
Bur	Norway	World War II: The cargo ship was bombed and damaged in the Bristol Channel (52°12′N 5°52′W) by Heinkel He 111 aircraft of Kampfgeschwader 27, Luftwaffe. She was beached on Goodwick Sands. Bur was later refloated, repaired and returned to service.
Corinia	United Kingdom	World War II: The coaster struck a mine and sank in the North Sea (50°55′N 0°35′E) with the loss of fourteen of her crew.
Fenicia	Italy	World War II: The cargo ship was torpedoed and sunk in the Mediterranean Sea 60 nautical miles (110 km) east of the Kerkennah Islands, Tunisia by HMS Unique (Royal Navy) with the loss of 29 of her 38 crew.
Reykjaborg	Iceland	World War II: The fishing trawler was torpedoed, shelled and sunk in the Atlantic Ocean 459 nautical miles (850 km) south east of Iceland by U-552 (Kriegsmarine) with the loss of thirteen of her fifteen crew. Survivors were rescued by HMS Pimpernel (Royal Navy).
Sparta	United Kingdom	World War II: The coaster struck a mine and sank in the North Sea (50°55′N 0°35′E) with the loss of nine of her crew.
Waterland	United Kingdom	World War II: The cargo ship struck a mine and sank in the North Sea (50°55′N 0°35′E) with the loss of seven of her crew.

== 11 March ==
List of shipwrecks: 11 March 1941
Ship	State	Description
Aberdeen	United Kingdom	World War II: The fishing trawler was bombed and sunk in Cardigan Bay by Heinkel He 111 aircraft of Kampfgeschwader 27, Luftwaffe with the loss of eight of her ten crew.
Memnon	United Kingdom	World War II: The cargo ship was torpedoed and sunk in the Atlantic Ocean (20°41′N 21°00′W) by U-106 (Kriegsmarine) with the loss of five of the 70 people on board. Survivors either landed in French West Africa and were interned by Vichy French authorities, or were rescued by Gneisenau (Kriegsmarine)
HMT Revello	Royal Navy	World War II: The naval trawler was bombed and sunk at Portsmouth, Hampshire by Luftwaffe aircraft. She was raised on 20 March and was later repaired and returned to service.
Trevethoe	United Kingdom	World War II: The cargo ship was torpedoed and sunk in the North Sea off Great Yarmouth, Norfolk (52°46′N 1°57′E) by Kriegsmarine E-boats with the loss of one of her 40 crew. She was on a voyage from Saint John, New Brunswick, Canada to London.
HMS Witherington	Royal Navy	World War II: The W-class destroyer was bombed and damaged at Portsmouth by Luftwaffe aircraft and was beached. She was later repaired and returned to service.

== 12 March ==
List of shipwrecks: 12 March 1941
Ship	State	Description
Buenos Aires	Sweden	World War II: The cargo ship was bombed and sunk at Liverpool, Lancashire by Luftwaffe aircraft. She was subsequently refloated, and used as a hulk at Scapa Flow, Orkney Islands.
Empire Frost	United Kingdom	World War II: Convoy SC 23: The cargo ship was bombed and damaged in St George's Channel (51°36′N 5°40′W) by Heinkel He 111 aircraft of Kampfgeschwader 27, Luftwaffe. She was taken in tow by Seine (Netherlands) but was bombed again the next day and sank (51°33′N 5°54′W) with the loss of six of her 43 crew.
Essex Lance	United Kingdom	World War II: The cargo ship was bombed and damaged in the North Sea (51°03′N 1°38′E) by Luftwaffe aircraft and was beached the next day off Cromer, Norfolk. She was subsequently refloated, repaired and returned to service.
Mammoth	United Kingdom	World War II: The floating crane was bombed and sunk at Liverpool by Luftwaffe aircraft.
Novelist	United Kingdom	The cargo ship was bombed and damaged at Manchester, Lancashire by Luftwaffe aircraft. She was subsequently repaired and returned to service.
Pétursey	Iceland	World War II: The fishing trawler (91 GRT) was shelled and sunk in the Atlantic Ocean south of Iceland (59°39′N 12°36′W) by U-37 (Kriegsmarine). Her 10 crew abandoned ship before she was hit but were never seen again.
Stella	Sweden	World War II: The cargo ship was bombed and sunk at Manchester by Luftwaffe aircraft. She was refloated in October. Subsequently repaired, and entered British service as River Swift.
Trevethoe	United Kingdom	World War II: Convoy FS 32: The cargo ship was torpedoed and sunk in the North Sea off Orfordness, Suffolk (52°46′N 1°57′E) by S-28 (Kriegsmarine) with the loss of a crew member.

== 13 March ==
List of shipwrecks: 13 March 1941
Ship	State	Description
Bullger	United Kingdom	World War II: The tug struck a mine and sank in Druridge Bay whilst towing Empire Breeze (United Kingdom). Her twelve crew were rescued.
Excelsior	United Kingdom	World War II: The Mersey flat was bombed and sunk at Liverpool, Lancashire by Luftwaffe aircraft.
V-22 Maremola	Regia Marina	World War II: The requisitioned 428 GRT motor schooner ran into a heavy storm and was forced ashore 11 nautical miles (20 km) west of Misurata. She remained aground until 28 March when she was destroyed by a heavy storm.
Myrmidon	United Kingdom	World War II: The cargo ship was bombed and sunk at Liverpool by Luftwaffe aircraft. She was refloated on 27 March and drydocked for repairs.
Ngatira	United Kingdom	World War II: The cargo ship was damaged in the Bristol Channel (51°21′N 3°17′W) by Heinkel He 111 aircraft of Kampfgeschwader 27, Luftwaffe and was beached. She was later refloated.
Perseus	Netherlands	World War II: The cargo ship was bombed and sunk in the Irish Sea 12 nautical miles (22 km) off Bardsey Island, Caernarfonshire, United Kingdom by Heinkel He 111 aircraft of Kampfgeschwader 27, Luftwaffe. Her crew were rescued.
Samlanes	Norway	World War II: The coaster (842 GRT) on a trip from Swansea for Shoreham with a cargo of coal, struck a mine and sank in the English Channel 2 nautical miles (3.7 km) due south of The Lizard, Cornwall, United Kingdom with the loss of 15 hands.
Santa Maria	Italy	World War II: The 3,539 GRT cargo ship was torpedoed and sunk at Valona by 5 Fairey Swordfish bombers of 815 Naval Air Squadron, Fleet Air Arm. There were one dead and two wounded. She was raised in September 1941 and towed to Venice for repairs.
Star XIX	Germany	World War II: The captured Norwegian whaler was intercepted in the Atlantic Ocean (approximately 45°N 23°W) by HMS Scarborough (Royal Navy) and was scuttled by her crew, who were rescued by the sloop.
Star XXIV	Germany	World War II: The captured Norwegian whaler was intercepted in the Atlantic Ocean (approximately 45°N 23°W) by HMS Scarborough (Royal Navy) and was scuttled by her crew, who were rescued by the sloop.
Tacoma City	United Kingdom	World War II: Convoy HX 110: The cargo ship struck a mine and sank in Liverpool Bay with the loss of four of her crew.
Two Brothers	United Kingdom	World War II: The fishing smack was bombed and sunk at King's Lynn, Norfolk by Luftwaffe aircraft.
Ullapool	United Kingdom	World War II: Convoy SC 23: The cargo ship (4,891 GRT) was hit by a parachute mine during a Luftwaffe raid on Merseyside, broke in two and sank in the River Mersey with the loss of fifteen of her 38 crew. The wreck was subsequently demolished.

== 14 March ==
List of shipwrecks: 14 March 1941
Ship	State	Description
Artemisia	United Kingdom	World War II: The cargo ship was bombed and sunk in the North Sea (52°53′N 1°39′E) by Luftwaffe aircraft with the loss of two of her crew. The wreck was dispersed by explosives in 1945.
Belhaven	United Kingdom	World War II: The collier was bombed and sunk in the Clyde by Luftwaffe aircraft.
Clermiston	United Kingdom	World War II: The cargo ship was bombed and sunk at Glasgow, Renfrewshire by Luftwaffe aircraft. She was raised in October 1941 and beached. In 1942, she was towed to Ardrossan, Ayrshire.
Empire Simba	United Kingdom	World War II: The cargo ship was damaged by a parachute mine at Liverpool, Lancashire following a Luftwaffe air raid two days earlier. She was repaired and returned to service.
Herport	United Kingdom	World War II: The cargo ship struck a mine and sank in the North Sea (53°15′N 1°05′E) with the loss of four of her 37 crew. The wreck was subsequently dispersed by explosives.
HMT Jeannie Leask	Royal Navy	World War II: The naval trawler struck a mine and was damaged in the North Sea (51°44′N 1°07′E). She was beached at Brightlingsea, Essex. Jeannie Leask was bombed on 25 March by Luftwaffe aircraft. She was refloated on 13 April and arrived at Wivenhoe, Essex.
Peaceful Star	United Kingdom	World War II: The drifter was bombed and sunk in the Irish Sea 17 nautical miles (31 km) east south east of Rockabill, County Dublin, Ireland. Her crew were rescued.
Po	Italy	World War II: The 7,289 GRT hospital ship was torpedoed and sunk at Valona roadstead (40°22′N 19°28′E) by Fairey Swordfish aircraft of 815 Squadron, Fleet Air Arm. There were 24 dead and 216 survivors.
Rainer	Finland	World War II: The cargo ship was bombed and sunk in the North Sea north of Juist, Germany by Royal Air Force aircraft.
Santa Clara	Brazil	World War II: The cargo ship was reported to be in distress after an explosion on a voyage from New York, United States to Rio de Janeiro. She was abandoned by her crew but apart from some wreckage, nothing was found of her, or her crew.
Stanleigh	United Kingdom	World War II: The cargo ship was bombed and sunk in Liverpool Bay 12 nautical miles (22 km) west of the Bar Lightship ( Trinity House ) by Heinkel He 111 aircraft of Kampfgeschwader 27, Luftwaffe with the loss of seventeen of her 23 crew.
Trevarrack	United Kingdom	World War II: The cargo ship was bombed and sunk at Dalmuir, Renfrewshire by Luftwaffe aircraft. She was refloated later that month, repaired and returned to service.
Western Chief	United Kingdom	Convoy SC 24: The cargo ship straggled behind the convoy. She was torpedoed and sunk in the Atlantic Ocean (58°25′N 21°13′W) by Emo (Regia Marina) with the loss of 22 of her 43 crew.

== 15 March ==
List of shipwrecks: 15 March 1941
Ship	State	Description
Athelfoam	United Kingdom	World War II: The tanker was shelled and sunk in the Atlantic Ocean (42°00′N 43°25′W) by Scharnhorst (Kriegsmarine) with the loss of two of her 47 crew. Survivors were taken as prisoners of war.
Bianca	Norway	World War II: The tanker was captured in the Atlantic Ocean by Gneisenau (Kriegsmarine). She was scuttled five days later when intercepted by HMS Renown (Royal Navy).
British Strength	United Kingdom	World War II: The tanker was shelled and sunk in the Atlantic Ocean (approximately (42°N 43°W) by Gneisenau and Scharnhorst (both Kriegsmarine) with the loss of two of her crew. Survivors were taken as prisoners of war.
HMS Chabool	Royal Navy	The tug sailed from Aden for Berbera, British Somaliland. No further trace, lost with all eight crew.
Eminent	Belgium	World War II: The cargo ship struck a mine and sank in St George's Channel, United Kingdom (52°32′N 5°37′W). Her crew were rescued.
Myson	United Kingdom	World War II: The cargo ship was shelled and sunk in the Atlantic Ocean (approximately 42°N 43°W) by Gneisenau (Kriegsmarine). Her 43 crew were rescued and taken as prisoners of war.
Rio Dorado	United Kingdom	World War II: The cargo ship was shelled and sunk in the Atlantic Ocean (approximately 42°N 43°W) by Gneisenau (Kriegsmarine) with the loss of all 39 crew.
Royal Crown	United Kingdom	World War II: The cargo ship was shelled and sunk in the Atlantic Ocean (approximately 42°N 43°W) by Gneisenau (Kriegsmarine). Her 39 crew were rescued; they were taken as prisoners of war.
San Casimiro	United Kingdom	World War II: The tanker was captured in the Atlantic Ocean (39°59′N 43°19′W) by Gneisenau (Kriegsmarine). Her 41 crew survived; three of them were taken as prisoners of war. She was scuttled five days later at 45°12′N 19°42′W when intercepted by HMS Renown (Royal Navy).
Simnia	United Kingdom	World War II: World War II: The tanker was shelled and sunk in the Atlantic Ocean (40°28′N 43°30′W) by Gneisenau (Kriegsmarine) with the loss of three of her 57 crew. Survivors were taken as prisoners of war.
Warrior	United Kingdom	World War II: The tug struck a mine and was damaged in the Clyde at its confluence with the River Cart. She was beached at Renfrew. Later refloated, repaired and returned to service.

== 16 March ==
List of shipwrecks: 16 March 1941
Ship	State	Description
Almkerk	Netherlands	World War II: The cargo ship was torpedoed and sunk in the Atlantic Ocean (13°40′N 20°30′W) by U-106 (Kriegsmarine). Her 66 crew were rescued by Martand (United Kingdom).
Beduin	Norway	World War II: Convoy HX 112: The tanker was torpedoed and damaged in the Atlantic Ocean (60°42′N 13°10′W) by U-99 (Kriegsmarine) with the loss of four of her 34 crew. She later broke in two, the bow section was shelled and sunk by a naval trawler at 61°02′N 11°53′W on 19 March, and the stern section was shelled and sunk at 61°07′N 10°50′W on 20 March. Survivors were rescued by the fishing trawlers Hilmir ( Iceland) and River Ayr (United Kingdom).
Bullger	United Kingdom	The tug struck a mine and sank in the North Sea off the coast of Northumberland.
Chilean Reefer	United Kingdom	World War II: Operation Berlin: The 1,739 GRT cargo ship on a passage from Liverpool for St. John, was intercepted, shelled and sunk in the Atlantic Ocean 200 nautical miles (370 km) east of Cape Race (45°58′N 44°00′W) by Gneisenau (Kriegsmarine) with the loss of nine of her 39 crew. Three of the survivors were taken as prisoners of war.
Demeterton	United Kingdom	World War II: Operation Berlin: The cargo ship was shelled and sunk in the Atlantic Ocean (45°58′N 44°00′W) by Scharnhorst (Kriegsmarine). Her crew were taken as prisoners of war.
Elna E.	Norway	World War II: The cargo ship struck a mine and sank in the Bristol Channel 18 nautical miles (33 km) south west of Lundy Island, Devon, United Kingdom with the loss of one of her nineteen crew.
Empire Industry	United Kingdom	World War II: Operation Berlin: The cargo ship was shelled and sunk in the Atlantic Ocean (43°27′N 45°25′W) by Scharnhorst (Kriegsmarine). Her 38 crew were taken as prisoners of war.
Erodona	United Kingdom	World War II: Convoy HX 112: The tanker was torpedoed and damaged in the Atlantic Ocean (61°20′N 17°00′W) by U-110 (Kriegsmarine) with the loss of 36 of her 51 crew. The ship was abandoned, she broke in two, with the stern section sinking. The bow section was towed to Edisvik, Iceland. It was later towed to Reykjavík and then to Blyth, Northumberland. Erodona was repaired, and returned to service in February 1944.
Ferm	Norway	World War II: Convoy HX 112: The tanker was torpedoed and damaged in the Atlantic Ocean (60°42′N 13°10′W) by U-99 (Kriegsmarine). The ship broke in two. Her crew were rescued by HMS Bluebell (Royal Navy) The bow section was scuttled by a naval trawler on 19 March at 61°02′N 11°53′W. The stern section was scuttled on 20 March at 61°07′N 10°50′W.
Giovanni Boccaccio	Italy	World War II: The 3,140 GRT cargo ship on a passage from Catania for Bari, was torpedoed and damaged in the Mediterranean Sea off Melito di Porto Salvo (35°57′N 15°40′E) by HMS Parthian (Royal Navy). She was beached at Condofuri to avoid sinking, and later refloated and towed to Reggio for repairs.
Granli	Norway	World War II: Operation Berlin: The cargo ship was shelled and sunk in the Atlantic Ocean 300 nautical miles (560 km) east of Newfoundland by Gneisenau (Kriegsmarine). Her eighteen crew were rescued and taken as prisoners of war.
J. B. White	Canada	World War II: Convoy HX 112: The cargo ship was torpedoed and sunk in the Atlantic Ocean (60°57′N 12°27′W) by U-99 (Kriegsmarine) with the loss of two of her 40 crew. Survivors were rescued by HMS Walker (Royal Navy).
Korshamn	Sweden	World War II: Convoy HX 112: The cargo ship was torpedoed and sunk in the Atlantic Ocean (61°09′N 12°20′W) by U-99 (Kriegsmarine) with the loss of 24 of her 36 crew.
HMT Lady Lilian	Royal Navy	World War II: The naval trawler was bombed and sunk in the Atlantic Ocean 75 nautical miles (139 km) west of Erris Head, Ireland by Heinkel He 111 aircraft of Kampfgeschwader 27, Luftwaffe.
Mangkai	Netherlands	World War II: Operation Berlin: The cargo ship was shelled and sunk in the Atlantic Ocean (approximately 44°N 43°W) by Scharnhorst (Kriegsmarine) with the loss of 36 of her 45 crew. Survivors were taken as prisoners of war.
Sardinian Prince	United Kingdom	World War II: Operation Berlin: The cargo ship was shelled and sunk in the Atlantic Ocean (approximately 44°N 43°W) by Scharnhorst (Kriegsmarine). Her 44 crew were taken as prisoners of war.
Silverfir	United Kingdom	World War II: Operation Berlin: The cargo ship was shelled and sunk in the Atlantic Ocean (approximately 44°N 43°W) by Scharnhorst (Kriegsmarine) with the loss of one of her 41 crew. Survivors were taken as prisoners of war.
Varangnes	Norway	World War II: The cargo ship was rammed and sunk in the North Sea by V 1106 Ernst von Briesen (Kriegsmarine).
Venetia	United Kingdom	World War II: Convoy HX 112: The tanker was torpedoed and sunk in the Atlantic Ocean (61°00′N 12°36′W) by U-99 (Kriegsmarine). Her 40 crew were rescued by HMS Bluebell (Royal Navy).

== 17 March ==
List of shipwrecks: 17 March 1941
Ship	State	Description
Andalusian	United Kingdom	World War II: Convoy SL 68: The cargo ship was sunk by torpedo in the Atlantic Ocean (14°33′N 21°06′W) by U-106 (Kriegsmarine). All 42 crew survived. 18 men in one lifeboat reached Boa Vista, Cape Verde. 24 men in another lifeboat were rescued by Nyassa (Portugal).
Andromeda	Regia Marina	World War II: The Spica-class torpedo boat was torpedoed and sunk in the Adriatic Sea off Vlorë, Albania by aircraft of 815 Squadron, Fleet Air Arm. There were 50 dead and 87 survivors.
Cormead	United Kingdom	The collier was torpedoed and damaged by Luftwaffe aircraft in the North Sea off Southwold, Suffolk. She was subsequently repaired and returned to service.
Einar Jarl	Norway	World War II: The cargo ship struck a mine and sank in the North Sea (56°17′N 2°18′W) with the loss of one of her 22 crew. Survivors were rescued by Medway Coast (United Kingdom).
HMY Mollusc	Royal Navy	World War II: The anti-submarine yacht was bombed and sunk and in the North Sea off Blyth, Northumberland by Luftwaffe aircraft. Her crew were rescued.
Tapanoeli	Netherlands	World War II: Convoy SL 68: The cargo ship was torpedoed and sunk in the Atlantic Ocean (15°56′N 20°49′W) by U-106 (Kriegsmarine). Her crew were rescued.
U-99	Kriegsmarine	World War II: The Type VIIB submarine was depth charged and damaged in the Atlantic Ocean (61°16′N 12°56′W) by HMS Vanoc and HMS Walker (both Royal Navy). She surfaced and was scuttled with the loss of three of her 43 crew. Survivors were rescued by HMS Walker and taken as prisoners of war.
U-100	Kriegsmarine	World War II: The Type VIIB submarine was depth charged and sunk in the Atlantic Ocean (approximately 61°N 12°W) by HMS Vanoc (Royal Navy) with the loss of 38 of her 44 crew.

== 18 March ==
List of shipwrecks: 18 March 1941
Ship	State	Description
Bremen	Germany	The ocean liner was set on fire in an arson attack at Bremen and was burnt out. She was scrapped in 1946.
Daphne II	United Kingdom	World War II: The cargo ship was torpedoed and damaged in the North Sea off the mouth of the Humber by S 102 (Kriegsmarine). She was beached off the Bull Lightship ( Trinity House) but broke in two and sank. Her 28 crew were rescued.
Medjerda	United Kingdom	World War II: Convoy SL 68: The cargo ship straggled behind the convoy. She was torpedoed and sunk in the Atlantic Ocean (approximately 17°N 21°W) by U-105 (Kriegsmarine) with the loss of all 54 crew. Medjerda was on a voyage from Freetown, Sierra Leone to Middlesbrough, Yorkshire.
HMS Rosaura	Royal Navy	World War II: The armed boarding vessel struck a mine and sank in the Mediterranean Sea off Tobruk, Libya with the loss of 78 lives.
Widar	Germany	World War II: The 5,972 GRT cargo ship was torpedoed and sunk in the Wadden Sea off Borkum by Bristol Beaufort bombers of Coastal Command, Royal Air Force.

== 19 March ==
List of shipwrecks: 19 March 1941
Ship	State	Description
Benvorlich	United Kingdom	World War II: Convoy OB 298: The cargo ship was bombed and sunk in the Atlantic Ocean (54°48′N 13°10′W) by Focke-Wulf Fw 200 aircraft of I Staffeln, Kampfgeschwader 40, Luftwaffe with the loss of five of her crew. Survivors were rescued by the convoy rescue ship Zamalek (United Kingdom).
Clan MacNab	United Kingdom	World War II: Convoy SL 68: The cargo ship collidedwith the tanker Strix (Norway) and sank in the Atlantic Ocean (17°13′N 21°22′W).
Juno	United Kingdom	World War II: The coaster was bombed and damaged at Surrey Commercial Docks, Rotherhithe, London by Luftwaffe aircraft. She was declared a constructive total loss.
Leo	Norway	World War II: The cargo ship was bombed and sunk in the Atlantic Ocean 75 nautical miles (139 km) north west of the Butt of Lewis, Hebrides, United Kingdom. Her 21 crew were rescued by HMS Echo (Royal Navy).
Mandalika	Netherlands	World War II: Convoy SL 68: The cargo ship was torpedoed and sunk in the Atlantic Ocean (18°16′N 21°26′W) by U-105 (Kriegsmarine) with the loss of three of her 65 crew. Survivors were rescued by HMS Marguerite (Royal Navy).
Nyegg	Norway	The coaster ran aground north of Egersund. Salvage efforts were abandoned and she was declared a total loss.
Tottenham	United Kingdom	The cargo ship struck a mine at Southend, Essex and was damaged. She was on a voyage from London to Halifax, Nova Scotia, Canada. She was subsequently repaired and returned to service.

== 20 March ==
List of shipwrecks: 20 March 1941
Ship	State	Description
Bianca	United Kingdom	World War II: The fishing vessel was sunk in the Irish Sea, probably by a mine, with the loss of five of her crew. According to other sources she was torpedoed by a Luftwaffe aircraft.
Cieszyn	Poland	World War II: The 1,386 GRT cargo ship while en route from Falmouth for the Clyde in ballast, was bombed and sunk in the English Channel 3 nautical miles (5.6 km) south south east of Manacle Point, Cornwall, United Kingdom by two Dornier Do 17 bombers. Her crew were rescued.
HMT Dox	Royal Navy	World War II: The 35 GRT requisitioned fishing trawler was bombed and sunk at Plymouth, Devon by Luftwaffe aircraft.
Elan II	United Kingdom	World War II: The tug was bombed and sunk at Plymouth by Luftwaffe aircraft. She was refloated in October 1941.
HMT Gloaming	Royal Navy	World War II: The 21 GRT requisitioned fishing trawler struck a mine and sank in the North Sea off the mouth of the Humber.
HMT Helvellyn	Royal Navy	World War II: The 642 GRT requisitioned paddle steamer, undergoing conversion to auxiliary anti-aircraft ship at London Docks, was bombed and sunk during Luftwaffe raid on London.
Joan Margaret	United Kingdom	World War II: The fishing vessel struck a mine and sank off the mouth of the Humber with the loss of five of her crew.
Lindenhall	United Kingdom	World War II: The cargo ship was bombed and sunk in Royal Victoria Dock, Plaistow, London by Luftwaffe aircraft. She was later raised and entered a drydock at Millwall, London on 23 April.
Mackay-Bennett	United Kingdom	World War II: The hulk was bombed and sunk at Plymouth by Luftwaffe aircraft. She was refloated on 28 July. Subsequently returned to service.
Mari II	United Kingdom	World War II: The cargo ship was bombed and sunk at Plymouth by Luftwaffe aircraft. She was refloated on 27 June, repaired and returned to service.
HMS Sir Bevois	Royal Navy	World War II: The tug was bombed and sunk at Plymouth by Luftwaffe aircraft with the loss of nine of her fourteen crew.
HMT Soizic	Royal Navy	World War II: The naval trawler was sunk by enemy action.
Sperrbrecher 12 Stolzenfels	Kriegsmarine	World War II: The sperrbrecher (7,512 GRT) was torpedoed by Royal Air Force aircraft in the North Sea off Schiermonnikoog, Friesland, Netherlands, and sank the next day off Ameland (53°26′N 5°10′E). The whole crew was saved.
Telesfora de Larrinaga	United Kingdom	World War II: The cargo ship was bombed and damaged at London Docks in a Luftwaffe air raid. She was subsequently repaired and returned to service.

== 21 March ==
List of shipwrecks: 21 March 1941
Ship	State	Description
HMT Asama	Royal Navy	World War II: The naval trawler was bombed and sunk at Plymouth, Devon by Luftwaffe aircraft.
Benwyvis	United Kingdom	World War II: Convoy SL 68: The 5,920 GRT cargo ship on a trip from Rangoon for Liverpool with a cargo of rice, timber amd metals, was torpedoed and sunk in the Atlantic Ocean (approximately 20°N 26°W) by U-105 (Kriegsmarine) with the loss of 34 of her 35 crew. The survivor was rescued by Ville de Rouen (France).
Clan Ogilvy	United Kingdom	World War II: Convoy SL 68: The 5,802 GRT cargo ship on a trip from Chittagong for Glasgow with general cargo, was torpedoed and sunk in the Atlantic Ocean (20°04′N 25°45′W) by U-105 (Kriegsmarine) with the loss of 61 of her 85 crew. Survivors were rescued by Batna (United Kingdom), Cabo Villano (Spain) and King Edgar (United Kingdom).
Embiricos Nicolaos	Greece	World War II: Convoy AS 21: The 3,798 GRT cargo ship was bombed and sunk in the Mediterranean Sea (34°30′N 24°45′E) by Junkers Ju 88 aircraft of III Staffeln, Kampfgeschwader 30, Luftwaffe with the loss of two of her 32 crew. Survivors were rescued by a Royal Hellenic Navy destroyer.
Halo	United Kingdom	World War II: The cargo ship struck a mine and sank in the River Thames at Beckton, London with the loss of four of her crew. She was later refloated and beached at the Royal Arsenal, Woolwich, London.
Jhelum	United Kingdom	World War II: Convoy SL 68: The 4,038 GRT cargo ship on a voyage from Izmir for Oban via Capetown with general cargo, was torpedoed and sunk in the Atlantic Ocean (approximately 21°N 25°W) by U-105 (Kriegsmarine) with the loss of eight of her 57 crew. Survivors landed in French West Africa and were taken as prisoners of war by Vichy French authorities.
London II	United Kingdom	World War II: The cargo ship was bombed and damaged in the Bristol Channel (51°23′N 4°30′W) by Luftwaffe aircraft with the loss of four of her eighteen crew. She sank 6 nautical miles (11 km) south of Mumbles Head, Glamorgan. London II was on a voyage from Manchester, Lancashire to Cardiff, Glamorgan.
Marie Mærsk	Denmark	World War II: Convoy AN 21: The 8,271 GRT tanker travelling in convoy was bombed and set on fire by Junkers Ju 88 bombers of II./LG 1 north of Crete. After the fire was extinguished, the ship was able to reach Souda Bay the next day.
Millisle	United Kingdom	World War II: The 617 GRT coaster on a trip from Cardiff for Cork with a cargo of coal, was bombed and sunk in the Bristol Channel 2 nautical miles (3.7 km) off the Helwick Lightship ( Trinity House) by Luftwaffe aircraft with the loss of ten of her crew.

== 22 March ==
List of shipwrecks: 22 March 1941
Ship	State	Description
Agnita	United Kingdom	World War II: The tanker was torpedoed and sunk in the Atlantic Ocean (2°30′N 25°00′W) by Kormoran (Kriegsmarine). Her crew were taken as prisoners of war.
Solheim	Norway	World War II: Convoy AS 21: The cargo ship was bombed and damaged in the Mediterranean Sea (34°30′N 24°10′E) by Junkers Ju 88 aircraft of III Staffeln, Kampfgeschwader 30, Luftwaffe. She was abandoned with the intention of salvage, but sank the next day. Her 32 crew were rescued by a Royal Hellenic Navy destroyer and a Greek tug.
Saint Fintan	United Kingdom	World War II: The 495 GRT coaster on a passage from Drogheda for Cardiff in ballast, was bombed and sunk in the Irish Sea 7 nautical miles (13 km) north north west of the Smalls Lighthouse by Luftwaffe aircraft with the loss of all nine crew.
Vestkyst I	Norway	World War II: The 370 GRT coaster on a trip from Oslo for Bergen was bombed and damaged off Skadberg, Jæren and subsequently beached. She was attacked again on 24 July by Royal Air Force aircraft and partly sank. The ship was refloated, repaired and returned to service in the Fall 1942.

== 23 March ==
List of shipwrecks: 23 March 1941
Ship	State	Description
British Prudence	United Kingdom	World War II: The tanker was torpedoed and sunk in the Atlantic Ocean (45°28′N 56°13′W) by U-754 (Kriegsmarine) with the loss of three of her 50 crew.
Carnia	Italy	World War II: The 5,451 GRT cargo ship travelling in a convoy from Bari for Durazzo via Brindisi, was torpedoed and damaged in the Mediterranean Sea by Triton (Royal Hellenic Navy). The ship was taken into tow by Carlo Mirabello (Regia Marina), but due to bad weather, the cables parted and she sank 30 nautical miles (56 km) north east of Capo Gallo (40°58′N 18°27′E) with a loss of a crew member. Carnia was subsequently salvaged.
Chama	United Kingdom	World War II: Convoy OG 56: The tanker straggled behind the convoy. She was torpedoed and sunk in the Atlantic Ocean west south west of the Fastnet Rock (49°35′N 19°13′W) by U-97 (Kriegsmarine) with the loss of all 59 crew.
Elmira	United Kingdom	The fishing trawler was bombed and sunk in the Bristol Channel (59°55′N 3°40′W) with the loss of ten of her eleven crew.
Nugget	United States	The motorboat was destroyed by fire at "Sukoi Island" – apparently a reference to either Sukoi Inlet (57.2353°N 135.6264°W) or the Sukoi Islets, Territory of Alaska. The only person aboard survived.
Tabarka	United Kingdom	World War II: The Admiralty-requisitioned cargo ship was scuttled in Kirk Sound, Scapa Flow as a blockship. She was later refloated, and was moved to Burra Sound and resunk on 27 July 1944.
U-551	Kriegsmarine	World War II: The Type VIIC submarine was depth charged and sunk in the Atlantic Ocean south of Iceland (62°37′N 16°47′W) by HMT Visona (Royal Navy) with the loss of all 45 crew.

== 24 March ==
List of shipwrecks: 24 March 1941
Ship	State	Description
Agnete Maersk	United Kingdom	World War II: The cargo ship (2,104 GRT) was shelled and sunk in the Atlantic Ocean (49°00′N 22°55′W) by submarine Veniero (Regia Marina). The crew was seen abandonning the ship with lifeboats but all (27 crew and 1 gunner) were never seen again. She was on a ballast voyage from Ardrossan to Saint John, New Brunswick, Canada.
Eastlea	United Kingdom	World War II: The cargo ship was torpedoed and sunk in the Atlantic Ocean by U-106 (Kriegsmarine) with the loss of all 37 crew.
Hørda	Norway	World War II: Convoy OG 56: The cargo ship (2,104 GRT) was torpedoed and sunk in the Atlantic Ocean (approximately 49°N 23°W) by U-97 (Kriegsmarine) with the loss of all 30 crew.
Nuraghe	Italy	The 633 GRT coastal tanker ran aground and became stranded off Capo Pali, Vlorë, Albania.
Oder	Germany	World War II: The cargo ship was intercepted in the Red Sea off Perim, Yemen by HMS Shoreham (Royal Navy) and was scuttled by her crew.
HMY Wilna	Royal Navy	World War II: The anti-submarine yacht (461 GRT) was bombed and sunk in The Solent (50°41′N 0°56′W) by Luftwaffe aircraft. There were no casualty.

== 25 March ==
List of shipwrecks: 25 March 1941
Ship	State	Description
Alaskan	United Kingdom	World War II: The fishing trawler struck a mine and sank in the Bristol Channel (54°49′N 1°07′W). Her five crew were rescued.
Beaverbrae	United Kingdom	World War II: The cargo ship was bombed and sunk in the Atlantic Ocean (60°12′N 9°00′W) by Focke-Wulf Fw 200 aircraft of I Staffeln, Kampfgeschwader 40, Luftwaffe. All 86 crew were rescued by HMS Gurkha and HMS Tartar (both Royal Navy).
Britannia	United Kingdom	World War II: The ocean liner was shelled and sunk in the Atlantic Ocean off the coast of Brazil (7°24′N 24°03′W) by Thor (Kriegsmarine) with the loss of 249 of the 484 people on board. Survivors were rescued by Bachi, Cabo de Hornos (both Spain) and Raranga (United Kingdom).
Cities Service Denver	United States	The tanker caught fire and exploded in the Atlantic Ocean off the coast of North Carolina. The ship sank while under tow by USCGC Shoshone (United States Navy). Nineteen crew members were reported missing after the explosion, which originated below the crew's quarters.
Escaut	Netherlands	World War II: The coaster was bombed and damaged in the Bristol Channel 24 nautical miles (44 km) south west of Hartland Point, Devon, United Kingdom. She was beached at Bude, Cornwall where her cargo of coal burned for a month. Escaut was refloated on 7 September and taken to Appledore, Devon. Repaired and returned to service as Empire Leech.
Nereus	Kingdom of Italy	World War II: The 348 GRT motor schooner departed Catania on 24 March for a mission on Rhodes. In the morning of 25 March, the ship sank under suspicious circumstances in the position 37°16′N 15°39′E. The crew of nine was able to reach Syracuse in a lifeboat, where they were detained under suspicion they had deliberately scuttled their boat, and were sent to Augusta.
Rossmore	United Kingdom	World War II: The 627 GRT coaster on a passage from Hayle for Barry in ballast, was bombed and sunk in the Bristol Channel 12 nautical miles (22 km) north east of Godrevy Island, Cornwall by Luftwaffe aircraft with the loss of six of her crew.
Trolleholm	Sweden	World War II: The cargo ship was attacked in the Atlantic Ocean by Thor (Kriegsmarine) and was scuttled. Her crew were taken as prisoners of war.
Waimarama	United Kingdom	The troopship ran aground in the Mediterranean Sea and was severely damaged. She was on a voyage from Port Said to Alexandria, Egypt. She was later repaired and returned to service.

== 26 March ==
List of shipwrecks: 26 March 1941
Ship	State	Description
Adige	United Kingdom	World War II: The cargo ship was bombed and damaged at Malta by Luftwaffe aircraft. She was beached at Malzara Creek; later repaired and returned to service.
Beinisvor	Faroe Islands	World War II: The fishing trawler was bombed and sunk in the Atlantic Ocean (61°40′N 4°37′W) by Luftwaffe aircraft.
Brier Rose	United Kingdom	The coaster sank in the Irish Sea.
Caroline Thordén	Finland	World War II: The ship was bombed and damaged at Thorshavn, Faroe Islands by Heinkel He 115 aircraft of Küstenfliegergruppe 706, Luftwaffe. She ran aground at 62°11′20″N 7°00′10″W and was abandoned. One passenger was killed and eight were rescued by Venezuela (Sweden). Caroline Thordén was refloated on 8 October and towed to Kirkwall, Orkney Islands, United Kingdom, where she was declared a constructive total loss. she was sunk as a blockship at Scapa Flow, Orkney Islands (58°50′30″N 2°54′04″W) on 10 October 1942. She was refloated in 1949.
Empire Mermaid	United Kingdom	World War II: The Design 1105 ship was bombed and damaged in the Atlantic Ocean (100 nautical miles (190 km) west of the Hebrides by Focke-Wulf Fw 200 aircraft of I Staffeln, Kampfgeschwader 40, Luftwaffe. Twenty crew and two displaced seamen were killed. HMS Achates (Royal Navy) rescued nineteen survivors. Empire Mermaid sank on 28 March at 57°33′N 12°43′W.
Faraday	United Kingdom	World War II: The cable layer was bombed and damaged in the Bristol Channel 3 nautical miles (5.6 km) off St Ann's Head, Pembrokeshire by Luftwaffe aircraft with the loss of sixteen of her crew. She sank the next day off Dale.
Helena	Italy	World War II: The coaster struck a mine and sank in the Mediterranean Sea off Palermo, Sicily.
Millimumul	Australia	World War II: The fishing trawler struck a mine and sank off Newcastle, New South Wales (33°34′N 151°56′E) with the loss of seven of her crew.
Knoll	Norway	World War II: The cargo ship was bombed and damaged in the Bristol Channel 8 nautical miles (15 km) west of Lundy Island, Devon, United Kingdom. She was beached on Lundy Island. Knoll was refloated on 29 March and escorted to Swansea, Glamorgan, United Kingdom.
HMCS Otter	Royal Canadian Navy	The naval yacht caught fire and sank off Halifax, Nova Scotia with the loss of 19 of her 41 crew. Survivors were rescued by HMS Talisman (Royal Navy) and Wisla (Poland).
RFA Pericles	Royal Fleet Auxiliary	World War II: Raid on Souda Bay: The tanker was torpedoed and severely damaged in Suda Bay by an Italian MT explosive motorboat. The damage caused her loss the next month.
Somali	United Kingdom	World War II: Convoy FN 442 (Thames for Firth of Forth): The cargo ship was bombed, damaged set on fire in the North Sea off Blyth, Northumberland (55°23′30″N 1°2′00″W) by Heinkel He 111 aircraft of the Luftwaffe. Taken in tow, she exploded and sank the next day south-east of North Sunderland, with the loss of one of her 79 crew.
Ticino	Italy	World War II: The water tanker (1,470 GRT) on a passage from Palermo for Trapani was sunk in the Mediterranean Sea north of Trapani, Sicily (38°06′N 12°31′E) by a mine laid by HMS Rorqual (Royal Navy). Seven of her 39 crew were killed.
Verde	Italy	World War II: The water tanker (1,432 GRT) on a passage from Palermo for Trapani was sunk in the Mediterranean Sea three miles west of Trapani by a mine laid by HMS Rorqual (Royal Navy). 23 of her 43 crew were killed.
HMS York	Royal Navy	HMS York World War II: Raid on Souda Bay: The York-class cruiser was disabled by being rammed by Italian explosive motor boats launched from destroyers Francesco Crispi and Quintino Sella (both Regia Marina). She was subsequently beached to prevent her sinking. On 22 May she was scuttled by Allied forces to prevent capture by Axis forces. She was salvaged in February 1952 and scrapped at Bari, Italy.

== 27 March ==
For the constructive total loss of the South African tanker Tafelburg on this day see the entry for 28 January 1941

List of shipwrecks: 27 March 1941
Ship	State	Description
Kinclaven	United Kingdom	World War II: The fishing trawler disappeared off the Faroe Islands for an unknown cause, thought to be enemy action, with the loss of all ten crew.
Koranton	United Kingdom	World War II: Convoy SC 25: The cargo ship straggled behind the convoy. She was torpedoed and sunk in the Atlantic Ocean (58°51′N 22°36′W) by U-98 (Kriegsmarine) with the loss of all 41 crew.
Meg Merillies	United Kingdom	World War II: The coaster was bombed and damaged in the Bristol Channel 1 nautical mile (1.9 km) south of the St Govan's Lightship ( Trinity House) by Luftwaffe aircraft. There were no casualties. She was taken in tow but sank after the towline parted.
Palmston	United Kingdom	World War II: The salvage vessel was bombed and damaged in the Bristol Channel 2 nautical miles (3.7 km) south east of the St Govan's Lightship ( Trinity House) by Luftwaffe aircraft. She was beached at Milford Haven, Pembrokeshire. Palmston was later refloated and taken to Pembroke.

== 28 March ==
List of shipwrecks: 28 March 1941
Ship	State	Description
Antwerpen	Netherlands	World War II: The coaster was bombed and sunk in the Bristol Channel (51°16′N 4°21′W) by Luftwaffe aircraft with the loss of three of her crew.
Borgund	Norway	World War II: The cargo ship disappeared after departing Reykjavík, Iceland, on 25 March with a cargo of fish for Scrabster, Caithness, United Kingdom. She was probably sunk by aircraft on this date. All thirteen people on board were lost.
Burgos	Norway	World War II: The cargo ship struck a mine and sank in the North Sea (53°18′N 1°09′E). Her 33 crew survived.
Fiume	Regia Marina	World War II: Battle of Cape Matapan: The Zara-class cruiser was shelled and sunk in the Mediterranean Sea (35°21′N 20°57′E) by HMS Barham, Valiant and Warspite (all Royal Navy). A total of 814 crew were killed; 164 survivors were rescued by the British and 105 by the Italians.
Generale Antonio Chinotto	Regia Marina	World War II: The torpedo boat struck a mine laid by HMS Rorqual (Royal Navy), and sank north-east of Palermo, Sicily with the loss of 48 of her 119 crew.
Giosue Carducci	Regia Marina	World War II: Battle of Cape Matapan: The Oriani-class destroyer was shelled and damaged in the Mediterranean Sea by HMS Barham, Valiant and Warspite (all Royal Navy), and was then scuttled by her crew. One hundred and seventy-one of her crew were killed or died in the next days before being rescued. Only 35 survived.
Heraklea	Germany	World War II: The cargo ship was torpedoed and sunk in the Mediterranean Sea off the Kerkennah Islands, Tunisia (35°40′N 11°19′E) by HMS Utmost (Royal Navy). Heraklea was carrying 206 or 212 German soldiers and 100 vehicles, 69 or 78 soldiers were lost.
Kestrel	United Kingdom	World War II: The fishing vessel was bombed and damaged in the Bristol Channel north of Lundy Island, Devon by Luftwaffe aircraft with the loss of one of her seven crew. She was beached on Lundy Island the next day but was subsequently wrecked in a storm.
Olivine	United Kingdom	The coaster was lost without trace in the Irish Sea with all fourteen hands.
Staffordshire	United Kingdom	World War II: The passenger ship was bombed and damaged in the Atlantic Ocean (59°30′N 10°18′W) by Luftwaffe aircraft with the loss of 28 lives. She was beached in Loch Ewe on 29 March and was refloated on 23 April.
Vittorio Alfieri	Regia Marina	World War II: Battle of Cape Matapan: The Oriani-class destroyer was shelled and sunk in the Mediterranean Sea by HMS Barham, Warspite and Valiant (all Royal Navy). Only 35 of her 245 crewmen were rescued.

== 29 March ==
List of shipwrecks: 29 March 1941
Ship	State	Description
Emma	United Kingdom	World War II: The Thames barge struck a mine and sank in the River Thames at Rotherhithe, London.
Exeter	United Kingdom	World War II: The fishing trawler was bombed and sunk in the Atlantic Ocean 5 nautical miles (9.3 km) south west of Ballycotton, County Donegal, Ireland by Heinkel He 111 aircraft of Kampfgeschwader 27, Luftwaffe with the loss of all hands.
Germanic	United Kingdom	World War II: Convoy HX 115: The cargo ship was torpedoed and sunk in the Atlantic Ocean (61°18′N 22°05′W) by U-48 (Kriegsmarine) with the loss of five of her 40 crew. Survivors were rescued by HMS Dianella (Royal Navy).
Hylton	United Kingdom	World War II: Convoy HX 115: The cargo ship was torpedoed and sunk in the Atlantic Ocean (61°20′N 18°10′W) by U-48 (Kriegsmarine). Her 44 crew were rescued by HMS Dianella (Royal Navy).
Kimberley	United Kingdom	World War II: The fishing trawler was bombed and sunk in the North Sea 22 nautical miles (41 km) south east of Flamborough Head, Yorkshire by Luftwaffe aircraft. Her crew were rescued.
Liguria	Sweden	World War II: Convoy OG 56 / Convoy OB 322: The cargo ship was torpedoed and sunk in the Atlantic Ocean (approximately 60°N 29°W) by U-46 (Kriegsmarine) with the loss of nineteen of her 29 crew.
Limbourg	Belgium	World War II: Convoy HX 115: The cargo ship was torpedoed and sunk in the Atlantic Ocean (61°18′N 22°05′W) by U-48 (Kriegsmarine) with the loss of 22 of her 24 crew.
Oiltrader	United Kingdom	World War II: The tanker was bombed and sunk in the North Sea (52°34′30″N 2°01′30″E) by Luftwaffe aircraft. Her 45 crew were rescued.
Pola	Regia Marina	World War II: Battle of Cape Matapan: Damaged by an aerial torpedo in the Mediterranean Sea (35°15′N 21°00′E) the previous day, the Zara-class cruiser was torpedoed by HMS Jervis (Royal Navy) with the loss of 328 of her 1,614 crew. British destroyers rescued 1,015 survivors (including 258 by Jervis), 110 more were rescued by Greek destroyers, and another 161 more by the hospital ship Gradisca (Italy).
Zara	Regia Marina	World War II: Battle of Cape Matapan: Shelled by HMS Barham, Valiant, and Warspite (all Royal Navy), and torpedoed and shelled by HMAS Stuart (Royal Australian Navy), HMS Havock, and HMS Jervis (both Royal Navy) late the previous evening, the Zara-class cruiser was torpedoed and sunk in the Mediterranean Sea (35°20′N 20°57′E) by HMS Jervis with the loss of 799 of her 986 crew died. Eight survivors were rescued by the Italians and 279 by the British.

== 30 March ==
List of shipwrecks: 30 March 1941
Ship	State	Description
Bertram Rickmers	Germany	World War II: The cargo ship was intercepted in the Strait of Perim by HMS Kandahar (Royal Navy) and was scuttled by her crew.
Celebes	Netherlands	The coaster departed from Liverpool, Lancashire for Falmouth, Cornwall, United Kingdom. No further trace, lost with all seven crew.
Coultarn	United Kingdom	World War II: Convoy OB 302: The cargo ship was torpedoed and sunk in the Atlantic Ocean (60°18′N 28°29′W) by U-69 (Kriegsmarine) with the loss of three of her 42 crew. Survivors were rescued by HMS California (Royal Navy)
Laura Corrado	Italy	World War II: The tanker) was torpedoed, shelled and sunk in the Mediterranean Sea west of Cape Gallo, Sicily (38°45′N 12°20′E) by HMS Rorqual (Royal Navy). There were 4 crew reported missing and 19 survivors.
Umona	United Kingdom	World War II: The passenger ship was torpedoed and sunk in the Atlantic Ocean 90 nautical miles (170 km) south west of Freetown, Sierra Leone by U-124 with the loss of 101 of 106 people aboard. Three of the survivors were rescued by HMS Foxhound (Royal Navy) and two by Lorca (United Kingdom).

== 31 March ==
List of shipwrecks: 31 March 1941
Ship	State	Description
HMS Bonaventure	Royal Navy	World War II: The Dido-class cruiser was torpedoed and sunk south of Crete, Greece (33°20′N 26°35′E) by Ambra (Regia Marina) with the loss of 139 of her 480 crew. Survivors were rescued by HMS Hereward (Royal Navy) and HMAS Stuart (Royal Australian Navy).
Castor	Sweden	World War II: The tanker was torpedoed and damaged in the Atlantic Ocean (57°59′N 32°08′W) by U-46 (Kriegsmarine) with the loss of fifteen of her 42 crew. Castor sank on 3 April.
Eisenach	Germany	World War II: The cargo ship had sought refuge in the neutral port of Puntarenas, Costa Rica, on 1 September 1939. She was scuttled by explosive devices just before being seized by Costa Rican authorities. Her 48 crew survived and were interned. She was later salvaged by the salvage tug Retriever and, after a second fire presumed to be due to sabotage, repaired and put into Costa Rican service as Oceanica.
Fella	Italy	World War II: The cargo ship had sought refuge in the neutral port of Puntarenas on 5 June 1940. She was scuttled by explosive devices just before being seized by Costa Rican authorities. Her 53 crew survived and were interned. She was refloated post-war and scrapped.
Galilea	Germany	World War II: The cargo was torpedoed in the Mediterranean Sea north-west of Tripoli, Libya (33°38′N 12°40′E) by HMS Upright (Royal Navy). Two crew were killed and three wounded. She was towed to Tripoli by Pegaso (Regia Marina). Galilea was not repaired and was finally scuttled in January 1943 before the loss of the port.
Helpmate	United Kingdom	The drifter sank off Newlyn, Cornwall for an unknown reason with the loss of ten lives.
Jole Fassio	Italy	World War II: The tanker was scuttled at Puerto Cabello, Venezuela after receiving news that the United States had seized all Axis ships interned in their ports. Her crew survived the sinking and the subsequent riot by angry Venezuelans, and were interned. She was later salvaged and entered American service as Alcibiades.
HMT Lord Selborne	Royal Navy	World War II: The naval trawler struck a mine and sank at the mouth of the Humber with the loss of seventeen of her crew.
Ontario	United Kingdom	World War II: The fishing trawler was bombed and sunk in the Atlantic Ocean (60°15′N 11°00′W) by Luftwaffe aircraft. Her crew were rescued.
Pier Capponi	Regia Marina	World War II: The Mameli-class submarine was torpedoed and sunk in the Tyrrhenian Sea south of Stromboli (38°42′N 15°12′E) by HMS Rorqual (Royal Navy). Pier Capponi was bound for La Spezia to be decommissioned, so had a reduced crew aboard, but all 38 were killed.
Trottiera	Italy	World War II: The tanker was scuttled at Puerto Cabello after receiving news that the United States had seized all Axis ships interned in their ports. Her crew survived the sinking and the subsequent riot by angry Venezuelans, and were interned. One crew member died during his internment in Venezuela. She was salvaged in 1943 and entered Panamanian service as Orissa.

== Unknown date ==
List of shipwrecks: Unknown date 1941
Ship	State	Description
HMS MGB 98	Royal Navy	World War II: The VTB-class motor gun boat was bombed and sunk at Gosport, Hampshire by Luftwaffe aircraft.
Nisus	United Kingdom	World War II: The fishing trawler went missing in mid-March with all ten hands. She was presumed sunk by enemy action off the Faroe Islands.
U-47	Kriegsmarine	The Type VIIB submarine was lost on or after 7 March with the loss of all 47 crew. Possibly sunk by HMT Northern Reward (Royal Navy) that reported a depth charge attack on a submarine on this date about where she was operating.
