= German submarine U-70 (1940) =

World War II submarine

History

Nazi Germany
- Name: U-70
- Ordered: 30 May 1938
- Builder: Germaniawerft, Kiel
- Cost: 4,439,000 Reichsmark
- Yard number: 604
- Laid down: 19 December 1939
- Launched: 12 October 1940
- Commissioned: 23 November 1940
- Fate: Sunk, 7 March 1941

General characteristics
- Class & type: Type VIIC submarine
- Displacement: 769 tonnes (757 long tons) surfaced; 871 t (857 long tons) submerged
- Length: 67.10 m (220 ft 2 in) o/a; 50.50 m (165 ft 8 in) pressure hull
- Beam: 6.20 m (20 ft 4 in) o/a; 4.70 m (15 ft 5 in) pressure hull
- Height: 9.60 m (31 ft 6 in)
- Draught: 4.74 m (15 ft 7 in)
- Installed power: 2,800–3,200 PS (2,100–2,400 kW; 2,800–3,200 bhp) (diesels); 750 PS (550 kW; 740 shp) (electric)
- Propulsion: 2 shafts; 2 × diesel engines; 2 × electric motors
- Speed: 17.7 knots (32.8 km/h; 20.4 mph) surfaced; 7.6 knots (14.1 km/h; 8.7 mph) submerged
- Range: 8,500 nmi (15,700 km; 9,800 mi) at 10 knots (19 km/h; 12 mph) surfaced; 80 nmi (150 km; 92 mi) at 4 knots (7.4 km/h; 4.6 mph) submerged
- Test depth: 230 m (750 ft); Crush depth: 250–295 m (820–968 ft)
- Complement: 4 officers, 40–56 enlisted
- Armament: 5 × 53.3 cm (21 in) torpedo tubes (four bow, one stern); 14 × torpedoes or 26 TMA mines; 1 × 8.8 cm (3.46 in) deck gun (220 rounds); 1 × 2 cm (0.79 in) C/30 anti-aircraft gun

Service record
- Part of: 7th U-boat Flotilla; 23 November 1940 – 7 March 1941
- Identification codes: M 17 952
- Commanders: Kptlt. Joachim Matz; 23 November 1940 – 7 March 1941
- Operations: 1 patrol: 20 February – 7 March 1941
- Victories: 1 merchant ship sunk (820 GRT); 3 merchant ships damaged (20,484 GRT)

German submarine U-70 was a Type VIIC submarine of Nazi Germany's Kriegsmarine during World War II.

The U-boat was laid down on 19 December 1939 at the Friedrich Krupp Germaniawerft shipyard at Kiel as yard number 604, launched on 12 October 1940, and commissioned on 23 November under the command of Kapitänleutnant Joachim Matz to serve with the 7th U-boat Flotilla from 23 November 1940 until she was sunk by British warships south of Iceland on 7 March 1941.

== Design ==
German Type VIIC submarines were preceded by the shorter Type VIIB submarines. U-70 had a displacement of 769 tonnes (757 long tons) when at the surface and 871 tonnes (857 long tons) while submerged. She had a total length of 67.10 m (220 ft 2 in), a pressure hull length of 50.50 m (165 ft 8 in), a beam of 6.20 m (20 ft 4 in), a height of 9.60 m (31 ft 6 in), and a draught of 4.74 m (15 ft 7 in). The submarine was powered by two Germaniawerft F46 four-stroke, six-cylinder supercharged diesel engines producing a total of 2,800 to 3,200 metric horsepower (2,060 to 2,350 kW; 2,760 to 3,160 shp) for use while surfaced, two Garbe, Lahmeyer & Co. RP 137/c double-acting electric motors producing a total of 750 metric horsepower (550 kW; 740 shp) for use while submerged. She had two shafts and two 1.23 m (4 ft) propellers. The boat was capable of operating at depths of up to 230 metres (750 ft).

The submarine had a maximum surface speed of 17.7 knots (32.8 km/h; 20.4 mph) and a maximum submerged speed of 7.6 knots (14.1 km/h; 8.7 mph). When submerged, the boat could operate for 80 nautical miles (150 km; 92 mi) at 4 knots (7.4 km/h; 4.6 mph); when surfaced, she could travel 8,500 nautical miles (15,700 km; 9,800 mi) at 10 knots (19 km/h; 12 mph). U-70 was fitted with five 53.3 cm (21 in) torpedo tubes (four fitted at the bow and one at the stern), fourteen torpedoes, one 8.8 cm (3.46 in) SK C/35 naval gun, 220 rounds, and one 2 cm (0.79 in) C/30 anti-aircraft gun. The boat had a complement of between forty-four and sixty.

== Service history ==
U-70's first and only patrol began on 20 February 1941. On 26 February she sank the 820 GRT Swedish merchant ship Göteborg, south of Iceland.

U-70 joined U-47, U-99, and UA in a wolfpack that attacked Convoy OB 293 south-east of Iceland on 7 March 1941. In her first attack at 04:45, U-70 damaged the 6,568 GRT British tanker Athelbeach (later sunk by U-99), and the 6,423 GRT British merchant vessel Delilian.

At 07:25 U-70 struck again and hit the 7,493 GRT Dutch tanker Mijdrecht. However the master spotted the periscope of U-70, rammed the submerged U-boat at 7 knots (13 km/h; 8.1 mph), damaging the conning tower, and reported its position to the convoy escorts.

=== Fate ===
At 08:15, the British corvette HMS Camellia sighted U-70, which promptly dived. Until 10:30 Camellia and her sister ship HMS Arbutus attacked five times with depth charges, then Arbutus made another four attacks. In total the two corvettes dropped 48 depth charges. Finally, at 12:44, U-70 was forced to the surface and was abandoned by her crew at 60°15′N 14°00′W. Twenty-five survivors of her crew of forty-five were picked up and taken prisoner.

== Summary of raiding history ==
Date	Ship	Nationality	Tonnage	Fate
26 February 1941	Göteborg	Sweden	820	Sunk
7 March 1941	Athelbeach	United Kingdom	6,568	Damaged
7 March 1941	Delilian	United Kingdom	6,423	Damaged
7 March 1941	Mijdrecht	Netherlands	7,493	Damaged

== Bibliography ==
- Busch, Rainer; Röll, Hans-Joachim (1999). German U-boat commanders of World War II : a biographical dictionary. Translated by Brooks, Geoffrey. London, Annapolis, Md: Greenhill Books, Naval Institute Press. ISBN 1-55750-186-6.
- Busch, Rainer; Röll, Hans-Joachim (1999). Der U-Boot-Krieg, 1939-1945: Deutsche U-Boot-Verluste von September 1939 bis Mai 1945 [German U-boat losses from September 1939 to May 1945] (in German). Vol. IV. Hamburg, Berlin, Bonn: Mittler. ISBN 3-8132-0514-2.
- Gröner, Eric; Jung, Dieter; Maass, Martin (1991). German Warships 1815-1945: U-boats and Mine Warfare Vessels. Vol. 2. Translated by Thomas, Keith; Magowan, Rachel. London: Conway Maritime. ISBN 0-85177-593-4.
- Bishop, Chris (2006). Kriegsmarine U-Boats, 1939–45. Amber Books.
- Kemp, Paul (1997). U-Boats Destroyed, German Submarine Losses in the World Wars. Arms and Armour. ISBN 1-85409-515-3.
