= Foreign U-boats =

Foreign U-boats was the title for a special section created by Nazi Germany's Kriegsmarine that adopted 15 captured enemy submarines and a single Turkish vessel into the U-boat corps. Beginning in 1939 and lasting until the end of World War II in 1945, the Kriegsmarine modified a total of 13 captured enemy submarines, then deployed them into combat with German crews. The special corps was not especially successful, as only ten enemy ships were destroyed by Foreign U-boats through the entire war. Eight of these were destroyed by UA, which was a modified Type IX U-boat originally built for the Turkish Navy. However, some were effective as minelayers.

== The captured submarines ==
- UA: ex Turkish submarine Batiray
- UB: ex British submarine HMS Seal (N37)
- UC-1: ex Norwegian submarine HNoMS B-5
- UC-2: ex Norwegian submarine HNoMS B-6
- UD-1: ex Dutch submarine HNLMS O 8
- UD-2: ex Dutch submarine HNLMS O 12
- UD-3: ex Dutch submarine HNLMS O 25
- UD-4: ex Dutch submarine HNLMS O 26
- UD-5: ex Dutch submarine HNLMS O 27
- UF-1: ex Africaine (Q196)
- UF-2: ex Favorite (Q195)
- UF-3: ex Astrée (Q200)
- UIT-22: ex Italian submarine Alpino Bagnolini
- UIT-23: ex Italian submarine Reginaldo Giuliani
- UIT-24: ex Comandante Cappellini
- UIT-25: ex Luigi Torelli

== See also ==
- Yanagi missions of the Imperial Japanese Navy in World War II to European waters
- List of IJN World War II submarines, including non-Japanese submarines in IJN service
