= HMS Arbutus (K86) =

Flower-class corvette

History

United Kingdom
- Name: HMS Arbutus
- Namesake: Arbutus
- Builder: Blyth Shipbuilding & Drydock Co. Ltd
- Laid down: 30 November 1939
- Launched: 5 June 1940
- Commissioned: 12 October 1940
- Identification: Pennant number: K86
- Fate: Torpedoed and sunk, 5 February 1942

General characteristics
- Class & type: Flower-class corvette
- Displacement: 925 long tons (940 t)
- Length: 205 ft (62 m)
- Beam: 33 ft (10 m)
- Draught: 13.5 ft (4.1 m)
- Installed power: 2,750 ihp (2,050 kW)
- Propulsion: Two fire tube boilers; One 4-cylinder triple-expansion steam engine,
- Speed: 16.5 knots (30.6 km/h; 19.0 mph)
- Range: 3,500 nmi (6,500 km; 4,000 mi) at 12 knots (22 km/h; 14 mph)
- Complement: 85
- Armament: 1 × BL 4 in (102 mm) Mk IX gun, 1 x quad 0.5 in (13 mm) machine guns; 2 x Lewis 0.303 in (7.7 mm) machine guns; two stern depth charge racks, two throwers with 40 depth charges

HMS Arbutus was a Flower-class corvette of the Royal Navy, which was active during the Second World War. She was a successful escort vessel, and took part in the destruction of two U-boats during the Battle of the Atlantic. Arbutus was torpedoed by a U-boat and sunk in the North Atlantic in February 1942 while aiding a convoy that was under attack.

== Construction ==
Arbutus was placed on order in July 1939, one of the first 26 "Flowers" of the pre-war building programme. She was laid down at the Blyth Shipbuilding Company, at Blyth, Northumberland, on 30 November 1939. She was launched on 5 June 1940 and completed 12 October 1940. She commissioned on the same day.

== World War II service ==
After trials and working up, Arbutus joined Western Approaches Command and was assigned to the 6th Escort Group, led by J. M. Rowland in HMS Wolverine for trade protection. In this role she was engaged in all the duties performed by escort ships; protecting convoys, searching for and attacking U-boats, and rescuing survivors. Over the next 14 months Arbutus escorted 26 convoys on the Atlantic routes, helping to bring over 750 ships to safety, though a number were lost in various incidents. She was involved in two convoy battles, and helped destroy two U-boats.

In March 1941, Arbutus, with the 6th EG, escorted Convoy OB 293 when it came under attack by a force of U-boats. The escort group mounted a vigorous and aggressive defence, resulting in the destruction of two U-boats and damage to a third, for the loss of two ships sunk and three damaged. During the two-night action, on 7 March 1941, Arbutus and Camellia found and attacked U-70; she was depth-charged and brought to the surface, where she was abandoned and sank.

In April 1941 the 6th EG went to the aid of Convoy SC 26 which was under attack. On 5 April Arbutus, with Wolverine and Scarborough, found and attacked U-76, which was brought to the surface and abandoned. As she surfaced Arbutus was closing to ram her; when he saw she was being abandoned Arbutus' commander, Lt. A. L. W. Warren, changed plans and attempted to capture the submarine before it sank. U-76 was boarded by several members of the crew, and efforts were made to secure and search the boat while Arbutus made fast to the U-boat with hawsers. U-76 was sinking too fast, and the attempt failed. This was the first such instance of a U-boat boarding in World War II; the exploit was repeated the following month when U-110 was captured by ships of the 3rd Escort Group.

== Fate ==
On 5 February 1942 Arbutus was escorting Convoy ON 63 when it was detected by U-136. The U-boat sent a sighting report and commenced shadowing, but the transmission was DFed and escorts Chelsea and Arbutus ran down the bearing to attack. The U-boat commander, K/L H. Zimmerman torpedoed Arbutus as she approached. The corvette broke in half and sank, with the loss of half her crew, 43 men, including her commander. U-136 was depth-charged by Chelsea, damaged and forced to abandon her pursuit, saving ON 63 from further harm.

== Successes ==
During her service Arbutus was credited with sharing in the destruction of two U-boats:

Date	U-boat	Type	Location	Notes
7 March 1941	U-70	VIIC	N Atlantic, N of Rockall; 60°15′N 14°00′W	Rammed by Mijdrecht, D/C by Arbutus, Camellia; forced to surface, abandoned, sunk
5 April 1941	U-76	VIIB	N Atlantic, S of Iceland; 58°35′N 20°20′W	D/C by Wolverine, Scarborough, boarded by Arbutus; sank due to damage received
