= HMS Verity =

Destroyer built for the UK's Royal Navy

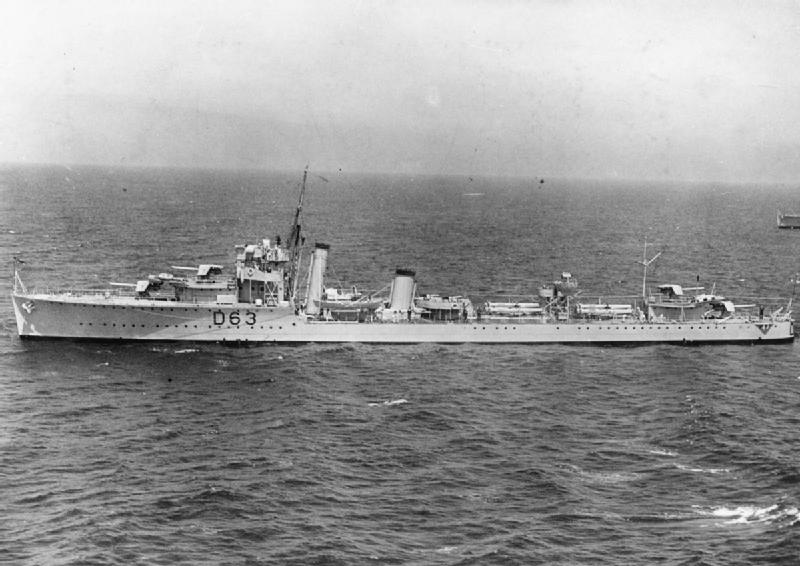
- HMS Verity circa 1930

History

United Kingdom
- Name: HMS Verity
- Ordered: January 1918
- Builder: John Brown & Company, Clydebank
- Laid down: 17 May 1918
- Launched: 19 March 1919
- Commissioned: 17 September 1919
- Refit: Reconstructed to Long Range Escort finished in October 1943
- Motto: Prevalebit; Truth shall prevail
- Honours and awards: Atlantic (1939-45); Dunkirk (1940); North Sea (1940); North Africa (1942–43)
- Fate: Sold to be broken up for scrap on 4 March 1947
- Badge: On a Field Black, a Roman Lamp Gold

General characteristics
- Class & type: Admiralty modified W-class destroyer
- Displacement: 1,140 tons standard, 1,550 tons full
- Length: 300 ft (91 m) o/a, 312 ft (95 m) p/p
- Beam: 29.5 ft (9.0 m)
- Draught: 9 ft (2.7 m), 11.25 ft (3.43 m) under full load
- Propulsion: As built 1920: 3 × Yarrow type Water-tube boilers, Brown-Curtis geared steam turbines, 2 shafts, 30,000 shp; LRE conversion 1943; 2 × Yarrow type Water-tube boilers, Brown-Curtis geared steam turbines, 2 shafts, 24,000 shp
- Speed: As built 1920: 32 kn; 1943 LRE conversion; 24.5 kn
- Range: 320-370 tons oil; 3,500 nmi at 15 kn; 900 nmi at 32 kn
- Complement: 127
- Sensors & processing systems: After 1943 LRE conversion: Type 271 target indication radar; Type 291 air warning radar
- Armament: As built 1920: 4 × BL 4.7 in (120-mm) Mk.I guns, mount P Mk.I; 2 × QF 2 pdr Mk.II "pom-pom" (40 mm L/39); 6 × 21-inch Torpedo Tubes; 1943 LRE conversion: 3 × BL 4.7 in (120mm) Mk.I L/45 guns; 1 × 3 in (76 mm) AA gun; 2 × QF 2 pdr Mk.II "pom-pom" (40 mm L/39); 2 × 20mm Oerlikon cannons; 3 × 21 in (530 mm) torpedo tubes (triple mount); 2 × depth charge racks; Hedgehog anti-submarine mortar

HMS Verity was an Admiralty modified W-class destroyer built for the Royal Navy. She was the first ship to carry the name Verity. She was ordered in January 1918 from John Brown & Company of Clydebank with the 13th Order for Destroyers of the Emergency War Program of 1918–19.

== Construction ==
HMS Verity's keel was laid on 17 May 1918 at the John Brown & Company Shipyard in Clydebank, Scotland. She was launched on 19 March 1919. She was 312 ft (95 m) overall in length with a beam of 29.5 ft (9.0 m). Her mean draught was 9 ft (2.7 m), and reached 11.25 ft (3.43 m) under full load. She had a displacement of 1,140 tons standard and up to 1,550 full load.

She was propelled by three Yarrow type water tube boilers powering Brown-Curtis geared steam turbines developing 27,000 shp driving two screws for a maximum designed speed of 34 knots. She was oil-fired and had a fuel capacity of 320 to 350 tons. This gave a range of between 3500 nautical miles at 15 knots to 900 nautical miles at 32 knots.

She shipped four BL 4.7 in (120-mm) Mk.I guns, mount P Mk.I naval guns in four single centre-line turrets. The turrets were disposed as two forward and two aft in super imposed firing positions. She also carried two QF 2 pdr Mk.II "pom-pom" (40 mm L/39) mounted abeam between funnels. Abaft of the second funnel, she carried six 21-inch Torpedo Tubes mounted in pairs on the centre-line.

== Inter-War period ==
Commissioned into the Royal Navy on 17 September 1919, she was assigned to the 1st Destroyer Flotilla of the Atlantic Fleet with pennant number D63. She spent the later part of the 20s and the early 30s in the Mediterranean. In 1938 the ship was assigned to the Local Flotilla based at Portsmouth.

== Second World War ==
Upon the outbreak of war in September 1939 she deployed for convoy defence in the South-West Approaches, escorting convoy GC1 from Milford Haven with HMS Witherington, HMS Wolverine and HMS Volunteer on 5 September. October saw her transferred to the 19th Destroyer Flotilla at Harwich for East Coast convoy defence until December.

HMS Verity was assigned to assist in the Evacuation of Dunkirk in 1940. She came under fire from shore batteries near Calais and suffered casualties.

She remained in the area after the evacuation as a convoy escort, and was attacked on 14 August by six Kriegsmarine trawlers and three E-boats. Two of the German ships were sunk in the resulting engagement.

=== North Africa ===
Operation Torch, the invasion of Axis controlled Africa, started in 1942. HMS Verity was assigned to escort military convoys in preparation of this attack. She supported the landings at Oran, during which she helped rescue troops from the stricken troopship Strathallan, which U-562 had torpedoed. Only 11 were killed in the attack, which was carrying more than 5,000 officers, men and crew. Strathallan sank nearly 22 hours after the torpedo hit.

== Bibliography ==
- Campbell, John (1985). Naval Weapons of World War II. Annapolis, Maryland: Naval Institute Press. ISBN 0-87021-459-4.
- Chesneau, Roger, ed. (1980). Conway's All the World's Fighting Ships 1922–1946. Greenwich, UK: Conway Maritime Press. ISBN 0-85177-146-7.
- Colledge, J. J.; Warlow, Ben (2006) [1969]. Ships of the Royal Navy: The Complete Record of All Fighting Ships of the Royal Navy from the 15th Century to the Present (3rd Rev ed.). London: Chatham Publishing. ISBN 978-1-86176-281-8. OCLC 67375475.
- Cocker, Maurice. Destroyers of the Royal Navy, 1893–1981. Ian Allan. ISBN 0-7110-1075-7.
- Friedman, Norman (2009). British Destroyers From Earliest Days to the Second World War. Annapolis, Maryland: Naval Institute Press. ISBN 978-1-59114-081-8.
- Gardiner, Robert & Gray, Randal, eds. (1985). Conway's All the World's Fighting Ships 1906–1921. Annapolis, Maryland: Naval Institute Press. ISBN 0-85177-245-5.
- Lenton, H. T. (1998). British & Empire Warships of the Second World War. Annapolis, Maryland: Naval Institute Press. ISBN 1-55750-048-7.
- March, Edgar J. (1966). British Destroyers: A History of Development, 1892–1953; Drawn by Admiralty Permission From Official Records & Returns, Ships' Covers & Building Plans. London: Seeley Service. OCLC 164893555.
- Preston, Antony (1971). 'V & W' Class Destroyers 1917–1945. London: Macdonald. OCLC 464542895.
- Raven, Alan & Roberts, John (1979). 'V' and 'W' Class Destroyers. Man o'War. Vol. 2. London: Arms & Armour. ISBN 0-85368-233-X.
- Rohwer, Jürgen (2005). Chronology of the War at Sea 1939–1945: The Naval History of World War Two (Third Revised ed.). Annapolis, Maryland: Naval Institute Press. ISBN 1-59114-119-2.
- Whinney, Bob (2000). The U-boat Peril: A Fight for Survival. Cassell. ISBN 0-304-35132-6.
- Whitley, M. J. (1988). Destroyers of World War 2. Annapolis, Maryland: Naval Institute Press. ISBN 0-87021-326-1.
- Winser, John de D. (1999). B.E.F. Ships Before, At and After Dunkirk. Gravesend, Kent: World Ship Society. ISBN 0-905617-91-6.
