= HMS Camellia (K31) =

Flower-class corvette

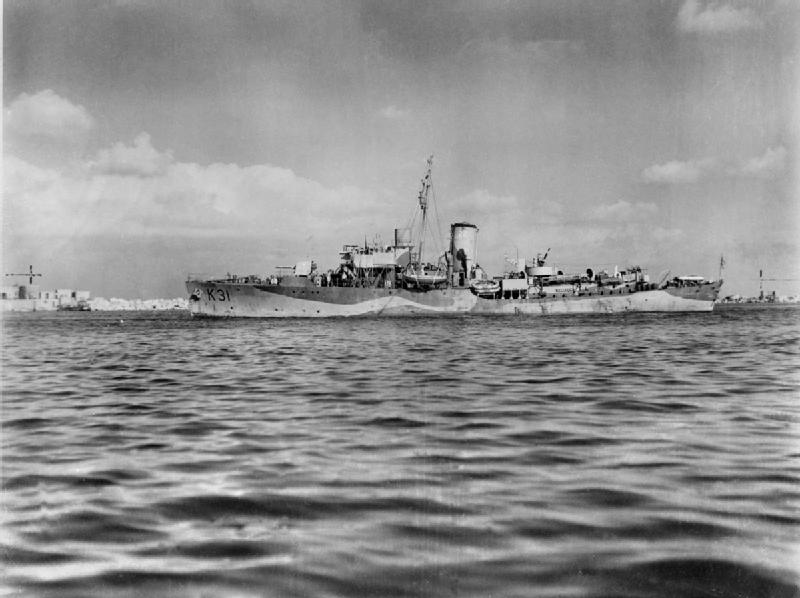
- HMS Camellia with a convoy, 23 September 1943

History

United Kingdom
- Name: HMS Camellia
- Builder: Harland and Wolff
- Yard number: 1064
- Laid down: 14 November 1939
- Launched: 4 May 1940
- Completed: 18 June 1940
- Commissioned: 18 June 1940
- Identification: Pennant number: K31
- Fate: Sold 1948

Netherlands
- Name: Hetty W Vinke
- Owner: NV Nederlandse Mij voor de Walvischvaart
- Acquired: 1948
- Fate: Scrapped 19 September 1965

General characteristics
- Class & type: Flower-class corvette

HMS Camellia was a Flower-class corvette that served in the Royal Navy.

She was laid down on 14 November 1939, launched on 4 May 1940, and commissioned on 18 June 1940.

== Operational service ==
In January 1941 Camelia served as a rescue transport for five crewman of the merchant ship Ringhorn which had gone down in stormy weather. On 4 February 1941 Camellia and the destroyer Harvester picked up 121 survivors from HMS Crispin, sunk by U-107. On 7 March 1941, serving as escorts for convoy OB 293 escort south-east of Iceland, Camellia and her sister ship Arbutus sank the German submarine U-70.

== Fate ==
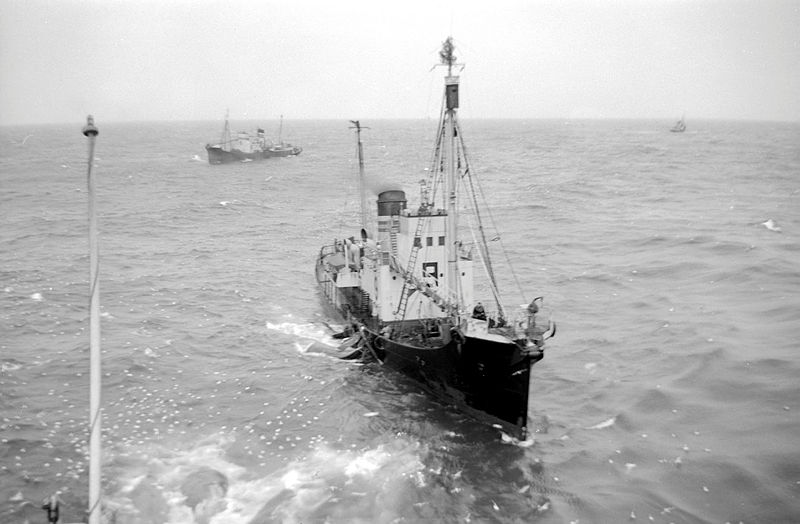
Hetty W Vinke

In 1948 she was sold for commercial service and renamed Hetty W Vinke.

== Publications ==
Colledge, J. J.; Warlow, Ben (2006) [1969]. Ships of the Royal Navy: The Complete Record of All Fighting Ships of the Royal Navy from the 15th Century to the Present (3rd Rev ed.). London: Chatham Publishing. ISBN 978-1-86176-281-8. OCLC 67375475.
