= German submarine UA (1939) =

German World War II submarine

- UA gun and conning tower detail

History

Nazi Germany
- Name: UA (ex-Batiray)
- Ordered: 1936
- Builder: Germaniawerft, Kiel
- Laid down: 10 February 1937
- Launched: 28 August 1938
- Commissioned: 20 September 1939
- Fate: Scuttled on 3 May 1945

General characteristics
- Displacement: 1,128 t (1,110 long tons; 1,243 short tons) surfaced; 1,284 t (1,264 long tons) submerged
- Length: 86.65 m (284 ft 3 in)
- Beam: 6.80 m (22 ft 4 in)
- Draught: 4.12 m (13 ft 6 in)
- Propulsion: Burmeister & Wain diesel engines, 4,600 PS (4,537 shp; 3,383 kW); BBC electric motors 1,300 PS (1,282 shp; 956 kW); 2 shafts
- Speed: 18 kn (33 km/h; 21 mph) surfaced; 8.4 kn (15.6 km/h; 9.7 mph) submerged
- Range: 13,000 nmi (24,000 km; 15,000 mi) at 10 kn (19 km/h; 12 mph) surfaced; 75 nmi (139 km; 86 mi) at 4 kn (7.4 km/h; 4.6 mph) submerged
- Test depth: 100 m (330 ft)
- Complement: 4 officers, 41 men
- Armament: 6 × 53.3 cm (21 in) torpedo tubes (4 bow, 2 stern); 1 × 10.5 cm (4 in) L/45 deck gun; 1 × 2 cm (0.79 in) C/30 anti-aircraft gun; 40 mines

Service record
- Part of: 7th U-boat Flotilla; September 1939 – March 1941; 2nd U-boat Flotilla; April – December 1941; 7th U-boat Flotilla; December 1941 – August 1942; U-boat Defense School; August 1942 – March 1943; 4th U-boat Flotilla; March 1943 – November 1944; 24th U-boat Flotilla; November 1944 – January 1945; 18th U-boat Flotilla; January – March 1945; 24th U-boat Flotilla; March 1945
- Identification codes: M 00 073
- Commanders: Kptlt. Hans Cohausz; 20 September 1939 – 31 October 1940; K.Kapt. Hans Eckermann; 1 November 1940 – 14 February 1942; K.Kapt. Hans Cohausz; 15 February – 14 May 1942; Ebe Schnoor; 15 May – 9 August 1942; Kptlt. / K.Kapt. Friedrich Schäfer; 10 August 1942 – 22 March 1943; Kptlt. / K.Kapt. Georg Peters; 23 March 1943 – 14 April 1944; Oblt.z.S. Ulrich-Philipp Graf von und zu Arco-Zinneberg; 18 April 1944 – 15 Mar 1945
- Operations: 9 patrols
- Victories: 7 merchant ships sunk (32,014 GRT); 1 auxiliary warship sunk (13,950 GRT)

German submarine UA was one of fourteen foreign U-boats in the German Kriegsmarine during the Second World War.

== Class ==
Built at Kiel as one of four submarines of the Ay class for Turkey, Batiray as she was to have been named, was not handed over to the Turkish Navy, being seized by Germany and commissioned into the Kriegsmarine in 1939. Two sister ships, Saldiray and Atılay, had been delivered in June 1939. One boat, Yıldıray, was built slowly in a Turkish shipyard. The design was a modification of the Type IX to fit Turkish requirements. Two of the Turkish U-boats served in the Turkish Navy until 1957, but Atilay was lost in a training exercise off Çanakkale.

== Service ==
UA was commissioned on 20 September 1939 under the command of Kapitänleutnant Hans Cohausz. She had been built as a minelayer by the Turks but the Germans used her like a Type IX U-boat. UA was attacked on 8 March 1941 by the destroyer HMS Wolverine but survived. During her service, she sank eight Allied ships, including the British 13,950 GRT armed merchant cruiser HMS Andania. Only ten ships in total were destroyed by the Foreign U-boats, UA destroying eight of those. She was used on training duties from July 1942 and carried out no more operational patrols. As the war was drawing to a close she was scuttled on 3 May 1945 at Kiel.

== Summary of raiding history ==
Ships sunk by UA
Date	Ship Name	Nationality	GRT	Fate
16 June 1940	HMS Andania	Royal Navy	13,950	Sunk
26 June 1940	Crux	Norway	3,828	Sunk
14 July 1940	Sarita	Norway	5,824	Sunk
3 August 1940	Rad	Kingdom of Yugoslavia	4,201	Sunk
15 August 1940	Aspasia	Greece	4,211	Sunk
19 August 1940	Kelet	Kingdom of Hungary	4,295	Sunk
20 August 1940	Tuira	Panama	4,397	Sunk
8 March 1941	Dunaff Head	United Kingdom	5,258	Sunk

== See also ==
- Oruç Reis-class submarine

== Bibliography ==
- Busch, Rainer; Röll, Hans-Joachim (1999). German U-boat commanders of World War II: A Biographical Dictionary. Translated by Brooks, Geoffrey. London, Annapolis, Md: Greenhill Books, Naval Institute Press. ISBN 1-55750-186-6.
- Gröner, Erich; Jung, Dieter; Maass, Martin (1991). German Warships 1815–1945, U-boats and Mine Warfare Vessels. Vol. 2. Translated by Thomas, Keith; Magowan, Rachel. London: Conway Maritime Press. ISBN 0-85177-593-4.
- Wynn, Kenneth (1998). U-boat Operations of the Second World War: Career histories, U511 – UIT25. Vol. II. London: Chatham. ISBN 978-1-86-176069-2.
