= List of shipwrecks in the mid-Atlantic Ocean =

This is a list of shipwrecks located in the main body of the North Atlantic Ocean, rather than in one of its marginal seas.

For shipwrecks elsewhere in the Atlantic Ocean and its marginal seas, see List of shipwrecks in the Atlantic Ocean.

| Ship | Flag | Sunk date | Notes | Coordinates |
|---|---|---|---|---|
| RFA Abadol | United Kingdom | 25 July 1917 | A tanker that was torpedoed by SM UC-41 64 nmi (119 km; 74 mi) northwest of the Butt of Lewis, Scotland. | 58°57′40″N 7°49′39″W |
| Abosso | United Kingdom | 29 October 1942 | A troopship that was torpedoed by the German submarine U-575 north of the Azores. | 48°18′N 28°30′W |
| Abgara | Latvia | 6 May 1942 | A merchant ship that sank after being torpedoed by U-108 southeast of Great Inagua Island. It was one of 8 merchant ships that continued to fly the Latvian flag after it was annexed in 1940. | 20°45′N 72°55′W |
| Aenos | United Kingdom | 17 October 1940 | A merchant ship sunk by U-38. | 59°0′N 13°0′W |
| NRP Afonso Cerqueira | Portuguese Navy | 4 September 2018 | A decommissioned corvette scuttled off Madeira Island south of Cabo Girão as a dive site and artificial reef. | |
| Agra | Sweden | 20 April 1942 | A merchant ship sunk by U-654. | 34°40′N 69°35′W |
| Aguila | United Kingdom | 19 August 1941 | A passenger liner that was torpedoed by U-201. | 49°14′N 17°34′W |
| USS Alcedo | United States Navy | 5 November 1917 | A patrol yacht that was torpedoed by UC-71 southwest of Guilvinec, France. | 47°23′N 4°44′W |
| Alexander Macomb | United States | 3 July 1942 | A Liberty ship torpedoed by U-215. | 41°48′N 66°35′W |
| Alexandra Høegh | Norway | 21 January 1942 | A tanker that was torpedoed by U-130 and later exploded, splitting in half. | 40°54′N 66°03′W |
| Allanshaw | United Kingdom | 23 March 1893 | A sailing ship that was wrecked at Tristan da Cunha. | |
| USS Alligator | United States Navy | 2 April 1863 | A submarine that sank under tow off Cape Hatteras, North Carolina. | |
| Almeda Star | United Kingdom | 17 January 1941 | An ocean liner and refrigerated cargo ship that was torpedoed by U-96 about 30 nmi (56 km; 35 mi) north of Rockall. | 58°10′N 13°24′W |
| Altamar | Argentina | 30 March 1960 | A merchant ship wrecked on Manoel Luis Reef north of São Luís, Brazil. | 0°46′S 44°20′W |
| RMS Amazon (1851) | United Kingdom | 3 January 1852 | A mail steamer that caught fire and sank 96 nmi (180 km; 110 mi) west of Scilly. | |
| RMS Amazon (1906) | United Kingdom | 15 March 1918 | An ocean liner that was sunk by U-110 northwest of Malin Head, Ireland. | 55°49′N 8°06′W |
| Amazone | Netherlands | 6 May 1942 | A merchant vessel that was torpedoed by U-333 14 nmi (26 km; 16 mi) southeast of Fort Pierce, Florida. | 27°21′N 80°04′W |
| USS America | United States Navy | 14 May 2005 | A decommissioned Kitty Hawk-class aircraft carrier scuttled 250 nautical miles (460 km; 290 mi) southeast of Cape Hatteras, North Carolina, after weeks of weapons testing against her. | 33°09′09″N 071°39′07″W |
| Amphitrite | French Navy | 8 November 1942 | A Diane-class submarine sunk at her moorings at Casablanca, French Morocco, by United States Navy dive bomber aircraft during the Naval Battle of Casablanca. | |
| RMS Andania | United Kingdom | 16 June 1940 | An armed merchant cruiser that was torpedoed by UA 61 nmi (110 km; 70 mi) off Reykjavík, Iceland. | |
| Andrea Doria | Italy | 26 July 1956 | An ocean liner that sank in a collision in Nantucket Sound, Massachusetts. | 40°29.408′N 69°51.046′W |
| Anselm | United Kingdom | 5 July 1941 | A troopship that was torpedoed by U-96 north of the Azores. | 44°30′N 28°30′W |
| Arandora Star | United Kingdom | 2 July 1940 | A cruise ship that was torpedoed by U-47, resulting in over 800 deaths. | 56°30′N 10°38′W |
| Argo | United States | 19 April 1854 | A packet ship that was abandoned in the North Atlantic following a hurricane. | 46°00′N 31°00′W |
| USS Arthur W. Radford | United States Navy | 10 August 2011 | A Spruance-class destroyer scuttled off Delaware about 30 nautical miles (56 km; 35 mi) southeast of Cape May, New Jersey, to form part of an artificial reef. | 38°31′N 074°31′W |
| Arundo | Netherlands | 18 April 1942 | A Dutch merchant ship that was torpedoed by U-136. | 40°10′N 73°44′W |
| Assyrian | United Kingdom | 19 October 1940 | A merchant ship that was torpedoed by U-101. | 57°12′N 10°43′W |
| Astrea | Netherlands | 7 March 1942 | A cargo ship that was sunk by the Italian Calvi-class submarine Enrico Tazzoli. | 28°55′N 63°30′W |
| Athenia | United Kingdom | 3 September 1939 | An ocean liner that was torpedoed by U-30 about 52 nmi (97 km) south of Rockall. | 56°44′N 14°5′W |
| Atlas | Netherlands | 10 January 1918 | A steamer that was sunk by U-156 25 miles (40 km) from Fuerreventura Island in the Canary Islands. | 28°32′N 12°52′W |
| Athinai | Greece | 18 September 1915 | A steamship that caught fire a few days out from New York City, allegedly due to sabotage. | 40°54′N 58°47′W |
| USS Atik | United States Navy | 26 March 1942 | A Q-ship that was sunk by U-123. | 35°38′N 70°14′W |
| Atlantis | Kriegsmarine | 21 November 1941 | A German auxiliary cruiser that was sunk by HMS Devonshire. | 4°12′0″S 18°42′0″W |
| HMS Audacious | Royal Navy | 27 October 1914 | A King George V-class battleship sunk by a mine north of Ireland off Tory Island. | 55°32′16″N 007°24′33″W |
| HMS Audacity | Royal Navy | 21 September 1941 | An escort carrier that was torpedoed by U-751. | 43°45′N 19°54′W |
| Austria | Hamburg | 13 September 1858 | A steamship that caught fire and sank en route to New York City, with 473 deaths. | 45°01′N 41°30′W |
| HMS Avenger | Royal Navy | 15 November 1942 | An Avenger-class escort carrier that was sunk by U-155 near Gibraltar. | 36°15′N 07°45′W |
| Avila Star | United Kingdom | 6 July 1942 | A cargo liner that was torpedoed by U-201. | 38°04′N 22°48′W |
| Avoceta | United Kingdom | 25 September 1941 | A passenger liner that was torpedoed by U-203 | 47°34′N 24°03′W |
| Barbacena | Brazil | 28 July 1942 | Merchant vessel that was torpedoed by U-155. | 13°10′N 56°00′W |
| Barima | Guyana | 18 July 2026 | A motor ferry that capsized and sank off the coast of Guyana 7 miles (6.1 nmi; 11 km) northeast of the mouth of the Pomeroon River after a large wave — apparently a rogue wave — struck her. | 07°28.213′N 058°23.443′W |
| USS Bass | United States Navy | 12 March 1945 | A Barracuda-class submarine scuttled for use as a sonar target off Block Island off the coast of Rhode Island. | 41.398116°N 72.086960°W |
| Beatus | United Kingdom | 18 October 1940 | A merchant ship that was torpedoed by U-46 | 57°31′N 13°10′W |
| Belgian Airman | Belgium | 14 April 1945 | A cargo ship that was torpedoed by U-857 east of Chesapeake Bay, Maryland. | 36°09′N 75°05′W |
| Benjamin Harrison | United States | 16 March 1943 | A Liberty ship that was attacked by U-172 and scuttled northeast of São Miguel Island. | 39°1′N 24°14′W |
| Bismarck | Kriegsmarine | 27 May 1941 | The largest battleship ever built by Germany. After sinking HMS Hood, Bismarck was pursued for two days by British ships and aircraft, and was eventually sunk by HMS Rodney, HMS King George V, HMS Norfolk, and HMS Dorsetshire. | 48°10′N 16°12′W |
| Blas de Lezo | Spanish Navy | 11 July 1932 | A Blas de Lezo-class light cruiser that sank after running aground on a shoal off Cape Finisterre. | |
| USS Block Island | United States Navy | 29 May 1944 | A Bogue-class escort carrier that was torpedoed by U-549 off the Canary Islands. | 31°13′N 23°03′W |
| Blommersdijk | Netherlands | 8 October 1917 | A steamer that was sunk by U-53 during World War I. | 40°40′N 69°36′W |
| USS Borie | United States Navy | 2 November 1943 | A Clemson-class destroyer that was scuttled after a battle with U-405. | 50°12′N 30°48′W |
| USS Branch | United States Navy | 8 October 1940 | A Clemson-class destroyer that was torpedoed by U-188. | 52°19′N 40°28′W |
| HMT Bredon | Royal Navy | 8 February 1943 | An escort trawler that was sunk by U-521 off the Canary Islands. | 29°49′N 14°5′W |
| USS Briscoe | United States Navy | 25 August 2005 | A Spruance-class destroyer sunk as a target east of North Carolina. | 34°49′N 072°31′W |
| Bristol City | United Kingdom | 5 May 1943 | A cargo ship that was torpedoed by U-358 east of Newfoundland. | 54°00′N 43°55′W |
| HMS Britannia | Royal Navy | 9 November 1918 | A King Edward VII-class battleship torpedoed by the Imperial German Navy submarine UB-50 just west of the Strait of Gibraltar. | 35°53′N 005°53′W |
| British Corporal | United Kingdom | 18 August 1942 | A tanker that was torpedoed by U-598 off Cuba. | 21°45′N 76°10′W |
| British Fame | United Kingdom | 13 March 1942 | A tanker that was sunk by the Italian Marconi-class submarine Alessandro Malaspina. | 38°07′N 22°58′W |
| British Premier | United Kingdom | 24 December 1940 | A tanker that was torpedoed by U-65 off the coast of Sierra Leone. | 6°20′N 13°20′W |
| British Prudence | United Kingdom | 23 March 1942 | A tanker that was torpedoed by U-754. | 45°28′0″N 56°13′0″W |
| USS Buena Ventura | United States Navy | 16 September 1918 | A cargo ship that was torpedoed by the Imperial German Navy submarine U-46 200 nautical miles (370 km; 230 mi) northwest of Spain. | |
| Burgondier | United Kingdom | 29 June 1941 | A steamship that was torpedoed by U-651 southeast of Greenland. | 58°18′N 38°12′W |
| Calabria | United Kingdom | 8 December 1940 | A cargo ship that was torpedoed by U-103 west of Ireland. | 52°26′N 18°04′W |
| California | United Kingdom | 7 February 1917 | A screw steamer that was torpedoed by U-85 southwest of Fastnet Rock, Ireland. | |
| Canonesa | United Kingdom | 21 September 1940 | A cargo ship that was torpedoed by U-100 300 nmi (550 km; 340 mi) west of Gweedore, Ireland. | 54°33′N 18°15′W |
| HMS Captain | Royal Navy | 7 September 1870 | A masted turret ship that capsized and sank in a gale off Cape Finisterre, Spain. | |
| Cardenal Cisneros | Spanish Navy | 28 October 1905 | A Princesa de Asturias-class armored cruiser that sank off Ferrol, Spain, after striking rocks on the Meixidos shoal. | |
| RMS Carpathia | United Kingdom | 17 July 1918 | A passenger ship torpedoed by the Imperial German Navy submarine U-55 in the Southwestern Approaches. | 49°31′15.9672″N 010°39′04.1616″W |
| Carsbreck | United Kingdom | 24 October 1941 | A steamship that was torpedoed by U-564. | 36°20′N 10°50′W |
| USCGC Casco | United States Coast Guard | 15 May 1969 | A decommissioned high endurance cutter sunk as a target near Vila do Porto in the Azores. | 36°40′N 24°16′W |
| Castillo de Bellver | Spain | 6 August 1983 | An oil tanker that caught fire and sank off Saldanha Bay, South Africa, spilling a total of 78.5 million US gal (1.87 Mbbl) of oil. | 33°16.55′S 17°30.28′E |
| Ceramic | United Kingdom | 6 December 1942 | An ocean liner that was torpedoed by U-151. | 40°30′N 40°20′W |
| Chancellor | United Kingdom | 23 September 1915 | A cargo ship that was sunk by U-41 86 nmi (159 km; 99 mi) southeast of the Fastnet Rock, Ireland. | |
| Chasseloup-Laubat | France | 1926 | The floating warehouse and cistern, a former French Navy Friant-class protected cruiser, sank at Dakhlet Nouadhibou on the coast of Mauritania. | |
| Cheeki Rafiki | United Kingdom | 16 May 2014 | A Bénéteau First 40.7 sailing yacht that capsized 720 nautical miles (1,330 km; 830 mi) southeast of Nova Scotia, Canada, after her keel detached. Her overturned hull was last sighted on 20 May and presumably sank sometime after that. | 38°37.0′N 048°06.7′W |
| USS Chopper | United States Navy | 21 July 1976 | A decommissioned Balao-class submarine that accidentally sank off Cape Hatteras, North Carolina, while tethered for use as an underwater torpedo target. | |
| City of Atlanta | United States | 19 January 1942 | A merchant ship that sank after being torpedoed by U-123. | 35°42′N 75°21′W |
| City of Benares | United Kingdom | 18 September 1940 | A passenger ship that was torpedoed by U-48. 260 people were killed, including 77 children who were being evacuated to Canada. | 56°43′N 21°15′W |
| City of Birmingham | United States | 1 July 1942 | A passenger ship sank by U-123. | 35°10′N 70°53′W |
| City of Cairo | United Kingdom | 6 November 1942 | A passenger steamer that was torpedoed by U-68. | 23°30′S 5°30′W |
| City of Flint | United States | 23 January 1943 | A cargo ship that was torpedoed by U-575. | 34°47′N 31°10′W |
| City of Nagpur | United Kingdom | 29 April 1941 | A passenger steamer that was torpedoed by U-75. | 52°30′N 26°0′W |
| City of Oxford | United Kingdom | 15 June 1942 | A cargo ship that was torpedoed by U-552 about 300 nmi (560 km; 350 mi) west of Cape Finisterre, Spain. | 43°41′N 18°2′W |
| City of Pretoria | United Kingdom | 4 March 1943 | A steamship that was torpedoed by U-172 northwest of the Azores. | 41°45′N 42°30′W |
| Clan Alpine | United Kingdom | 13 March 1943 | A cargo ship that was torpedoed by U-107 west of Cape Finisterre, Spain. | 42°45′N 13°31′W |
| Clan Chisholm | United Kingdom | 17 October 1939 | A cargo ship that was torpedoed by U-48 about 130 nmi (240 km; 150 mi) northwest of Cape Finisterre, Spain. | 45°15′N 15°5′W |
| Clan Macwhirter | United Kingdom | 27 August 1942 | A cargo ship that was torpedoed by U-156 about 170 nmi (320 km; 200 mi) northwest of Madeira, Portugal. | 35°45′N 18°45′W |
| Clan Matheson | United Kingdom | 27 July 1955 | A cargo ship that was scuttled as part of Operation Sandcastle. | 56°30′N 12°00′W |
| Clearton | United Kingdom | 1 July 1940 | A steamship that was torpedoed by U-102. | 47°53′N 9°30′W |
| NRP Comandante Hermenegildo Capelo | Portuguese Navy | 15 June 2013 | A decommissioned frigate scuttled as an artificial reef near Portimão, Portugal. | |
| USS Comte de Grasse | United States Navy | 7 June 2006 | A Spruance-class destroyer sunk as a target 275 nautical miles (509 km; 316 mi) off North Carolina. | |
| USS Conolly | United States Navy | 29 April 2009 | A Spruance-class destroyer sunk as a target off Florida. | |
| USCGC Coos Bay | United States Coast Guard | 9 January 1968 | A Casco-class cutter that was sunk as a target 120 nmi (220 km; 140 mi) off Virginia. | |
| Corinthic | United Kingdom | 13 April 1941 | A merchant ship that was torpedoed by U-124 southwest of Freetown, Sierra Leone. | 8°10′N 14°40′W |
| HMS Cossack | Royal Navy | 27 October 1941 | A Tribal-class destroyer that sank under tow west of Gibraltar. | 35°56′N 10°4′W |
| Cotati | United States | 29 September 1942 | A refrigerated cargo ship that was torpedoed by U-125 about 350 miles southwest of Freetown, Sierra Leone. | 04°05′N 13°23′W |
| HMS Courageous | Royal Navy | 17 September 1939 | A Courageous-class aircraft carrier that was torpedoed by U-29. | 50°10′N 14°45′W |
| Creekirk | United Kingdom | 18 October 1940 | A cargo ship that was torpedoed by U-101 northwest of Rockall. | 57°18′N 11°06′W |
| Crown Arun | United Kingdom | 17 September 1940 | A cargo ship that was torpedoed by U-99 north of Rockall. | 58°02′N 14°18′W |
| HMS Curacoa | Royal Navy | 2 October 1942 | A C-class light cruiser that collided with RMS Queen Mary 32 nmi (60 km; 37 mi) north of Ireland. | 55°50′N 8°38′W |
| Cyclops | United Kingdom | 11 January 1942 | A cargo ship that was torpedoed by U-123 southeast of Cape Sable Island, Canada. | 41°51′N 63°48′W |
| USS D-2 | United States Navy | 14 September 1917 | A D-class submarine that accidentally sank pierside at Naval Submarine Base New London, in Groton, Connecticut. | |
| Davara | United Kingdom | 13 September 1939 | A naval trawler that was sunk by U-27 while fishing off the coast of Ireland. | 55°31′15″N 8°37′57″W |
| Daytonian | United Kingdom | 13 March 1942 | A cargo ship that was sunk by the Italian Calvi-class submarine Enrico Tazzoli. | 26°30′N 74°30′W |
| HMS Decoy | Royal Navy | 13 August 1904 | A B-class destroyer that sank after colliding with the British destroyer HMS Arun off the Isles of Scilly. | |
| USS Deyo | United States Navy | 25 August 2005 | A Spruance-class destroyer sunk as a target. | |
| HMS Diana | Royal Navy | 22 October 1940 | A D-class destroyer that collided with Port Fairy 260 nmi (480 km; 300 mi) west of Ireland. | 53°24′N 22°50′W |
| USS Dixon | United States Navy | 21 July 2003 | An L. Y. Spear-class submarine tender sunk as a target southeast of Charleston, South Carolina. | 31°16′17.9″N 073°57′46.2″W |
| Doggerbank | Germany | 3 March 1943 | A German blockade runner that was accidentally sunk by U-43. | 29°10′00″N 34°10′00″W |
| RMS Duchess of Atholl | United Kingdom | 10 October 1942 | An ocean liner that was torpedoed by U-178. | |
| Duchess of York | United Kingdom | 12 July 1943 | An ocean liner that was scuttled after taking damage from German bombers. | 41°15′N 15°24′W |
| HMS Dundee | Royal Navy | 15 September 1940 | A sloop that was torpedoed by U-48. | 56°45′N 14°14′W |
| HMS Dunedin | Royal Navy | 24 November 1941 | A Danae-class light cruiser that was sunk by U-124. | 03°00′S 26°00′W |
| Dwinsk | United Kingdom | 18 June 1918 | An ocean liner that was torpedoed by U-151. | 39°10′N 63°10′W |
| Empire Ability | United Kingdom | 27 June 1941 | A steam merchant ship that was torpedoed by U-69 off the west coast of Africa. | 23°50′N 21°10′W |
| Empire Adventure | United Kingdom | 23 September 1940 | A steamship that was torpedoed by U-138 and later sank under tow. | 55°48′N 7°22′W |
| Empire Antelope | United Kingdom | 2 November 1942 | A cargo ship that was torpedoed by U-402. | 52°26′N 45°22′W |
| Empire Arnold | United Kingdom | 4 August 1942 | A cargo ship that was torpedoed by U-155 off the coast of South America. | 10°45′N 52°30′W |
| Empire Bell | United Kingdom | 25 September 1942 | A collier that was torpedoed by U-442 south of Iceland. | 62°19′N 15°27′W |
| Empire Bowman | United Kingdom | 30 March 1943 | A cargo ship that was torpedoed by U-404 northwest of Cape Finisterre. | 47°26′N 15°53′W |
| Empire Breeze | United Kingdom | 27 August 1942 | A cargo ship that was torpedoed by U-176. | 49°22′N 35°52′W |
| Empire Brigade | United Kingdom | 19 October 1940 | A cargo ship that was torpedoed by U-99 about 87 nmi (160 km; 100 mi) southeast of Rockall. | 57°12′N 10°43′W |
| Empire Bruce | United Kingdom | 18 April 1943 | A cargo ship that was torpedoed by U-123 about 100 nmi (190 km; 120 mi) off Freetown, Sierra Leone. | 06°40′N 13°17′W |
| Empire Burton | United Kingdom | 20 September 1941 | A CAM ship that was torpedoed by U-74 east of Cape Farewell, Greenland. | 61°34′N 35°05′W |
| Empire Caribou | United Kingdom | 10 May 1941 | A cargo ship that was torpedoed by U-556. | 59°28′N 35°44′W |
| Empire Clough | United Kingdom | 10 June 1942 | A cargo ship that was torpedoed by U-94. | 51°50′N 35°00′W |
| Empire Comet | United Kingdom | 17 February 1940 | A cargo ship that was torpedoed by U-136. | 58°15′N 17°10′W |
| Empire Cormorant | United Kingdom | 1 October 1945 | A cargo ship that was scuttled northwest of Ireland with a cargo of obsolete chemical ammunition. | 55°30′N 11°00′W |
| Empire Crossbill | United Kingdom | 11 September 1942 | A cargo ship that was torpedoed by U-81 off the coast of Greenland. | 63°14′N 37°12′W |
| Empire Dabchick | United Kingdom | 3 December 1942 | A cargo ship that was torpedoed by U-183 about 200 nmi (370 km; 230 mi) east of Sable Island, Canada. | 43°00′N 58°17′W |
| Empire Dawn | United Kingdom | 11 September 1942 | A cargo ship that was sunk by German auxiliary cruiser Michel west of Cape Town, South Africa. | 34°00′S 2°00′E |
| Empire Dell | United Kingdom | 12 May 1942 | A CAM ship that was torpedoed by U-124. | 53°00′N 29°57′W |
| Empire Dew | United Kingdom | 12 June 1941 | A cargo ship that was torpedoed by U-48 north of the Azores. | 51°09′N 30°16′W |
| Empire Drum | United Kingdom | 24 April 1942 | A cargo ship that was torpedoed by U-136 about 280 nmi (520 km; 320 mi) southeast of New York. | 37°00′N 69°15′W |
| Empire Dryden | United Kingdom | 20 April 1942 | A cargo ship that was torpedoed by U-572 about 240 nmi (440 km; 280 mi) northwest of Bermuda. | 34°12′N 69°00′W |
| Empire Endurance | United Kingdom | 20 April 1941 | A cargo liner that was torpedoed by U-73 southwest of Rockall. | 53°05′N 23°14′W |
| Empire Engineer | United Kingdom | 4 February 1941 | A refrigerated cargo ship that was torpedoed by U-123. | 54°21′N 23°15′W |
| Empire Hartebeeste | United Kingdom | 20 September 1942 | A cargo ship that was torpedoed by the German submarine U-596. | 56°20′N 38°10′W |
| Empire Miniver | United Kingdom | 18 October 1940 | A cargo ship that was torpedoed by U-99 about 100 nmi (190 km; 120 mi) southwest of Barra Head, Outer Hebrides. | 56°40′N 10°45′W |
| Empire Simba | United Kingdom | 11 September 1945 | A cargo ship that was scuttled off Ireland with a cargo of chemical weapons. | 55°12′N 11°0′W |
| Empire Star | United Kingdom | 23 October 1942 | A cargo liner that was torpedoed by U-615. | 48°14′N 26°22′W |
| Empire Steel | United Kingdom | 24 March 1942 | A tanker that was torpedoed by U-123 that was unescorted. | 37°45′N 63°17′W |
| Empire Tower | United Kingdom | 5 March 1943 | A cargo ship that was sunk by U-130. | 43°30′N 14°28′W |
| Empire Wildebeeste | United Kingdom | 24 February 1942 | A cargo ship that was torpedoed by U-106. | 39°30′N 59°54′W |
| RMS Empress of Britain | United Kingdom | 28 October 1940 | An ocean liner that was torpedoed by U-32 northwest of Gweedore, Ireland. | 55°16′N 9°50′W |
| Fairport | United States | 16 July 1942 | A cargo ship that was torpedoed by U-161 about 500 nmi (930 km; 580 mi) northwest of the Virgin Islands. | 27°10′N 64°33′W |
| Fanad Head | United Kingdom | 14 September 1939 | A cargo ship that was torpedoed by U-30. | 56°43′N 15°21′W |
| Federal | United States | 30 April 1942 | A tanker that sank after being torpedoed by U-507 north of Gibara, Cuba. | 21°13′N 76°05′W |
| HMS Fidelity | Royal Navy | 30 December 1942 | A Q-ship that was torpedoed by U-435. | 43°23′N 27°07′W |
| HMS Firedrake | Royal Navy | 17 December 1942 | An F-class destroyer that was torpedoed by U-211. | 50°50′N 25°15′W |
| Fiscus | United Kingdom | 18 October 1940 | A merchant ship that was torpedoed by U-99 east of Rockall. | 57°29′N 11°10′W |
| USS Fiske | United States Navy | 2 August 1944 | An Edsall-class destroyer escort that was torpedoed by U-804. | 47°11′N 33°29′W |
| Ganges | British East India Company | 29 May 1807 | An East Indiaman that sprung a leak and sank south of Cape Agulhas, South Africa. | 38°22′S 19°50′E |
| NRP Geba | Portuguese Navy | 21 June 2008 | A decommissioned patrol vessel sunk as a target in the Atlantic Ocean by a RIM-7 Sea Sparrow antiship missile fired by the frigate NRP Vasco da Gama (Portuguese Navy). | |
| NRP General Pereira D’Eça | Portuguese Navy | 13 July 2016 | A decommissioned corvette scuttled as an artificial reef off Porto Santo Island in the Madeira Islands. | |
| Germaine | Greece | 15 December 1939 | A cargo ship that was torpedoed by U-48 southwest of Ireland. | 51°00′N 12°18′W |
| Golar Patricia | Liberia | 5 November 1973 | An oil tanker that suffered three large explosions and sank about 130 miles northeast of the Canary Islands. | |
| Gulftrade | United States | 17 June 1942 | A merchant ship that sank after being torpedoed by U-588. | 39°50′N 73°52′W |
| HMS Guysborough | Royal Navy | 17 March 1945 | A Bangor-class minesweeper that was torpedoed by U-868 near the Bay of Biscay. | 46°43′N 9°30′W |
| USS Gyatt | United States Navy | 11 June 1970 | A Gearing-class destroyer and world's first guided missile destroyer sunk as a target off the Virginia Capes. | |
| Hagan | United States | 11 June 1942 | A tanker that sank off the north coast of Cuba after being torpedoed by the German submarine U-157. | 22°00′N 77°30′W |
| HMS Hampshire | Royal Navy | 5 June 1916 | A Devonshire-class armoured cruiser sunk by a mine 1.5 nautical miles (2.8 km; 1.7 mi) off Mainland in the Orkney Islands between Brough of Birsay and Marwick Head. | 59°7.065′N 003°23.843′W |
| Hans Hedtoft | Denmark | 30 January 1959 | An ocean liner which hit an iceberg on her maiden voyage to Greenland and sank with all hands. | 59°30′N 43°00′W |
| USS Hayler | United States Navy | 13 November 2004 | A Spruance-class destroyer sunk as a target. | |
| Hertford | United Kingdom | 29 March 1942 | A merchant ship torpedoed by U-571. Originally a German ship but was later transferred to the UK as part of World War 1 reparations. | 40°50′N 63°31′W |
| HMS Hilary | Royal Navy | 25 May 1917 | A passenger-cargo vessel torpedoed by U-88 35 nmi (64 km; 40 mi) west of Lerwick, Shetland Islands. | |
| Hobbema | Netherlands | 4 November 1942 | A cargo ship torpedoed by U-132. | 55°18′N 40°0′W |
| HMS Hood | Royal Navy | 24 May 1941 | The last battlecruiser built for the Royal Navy. | 63°20′N 31°50′W |
| USS Hopewell | United States Navy | 19 August 1941 | A Wickes-class destroyer that was torpedoed by U-204. | 49°0′N 17°0′W |
| HMS Hurricane | Royal Navy | 25 December 1943 | A H-class destroyer that was torpedoed by U-415 and later scuttled. | 45°10′N 22°05′W |
| HMS Hurst Castle | Royal Navy | 1 September 1944 | A Castle-class corvette that was torpedoed by U-482. | 55°27′N 8°12′W |
| I-52 | Imperial Japanese Navy | 24 June 1944 | A Japanese submarine sunk by Allied forces along with its cargo of opium, caffeine, and gold. | 15°16′N 39°55′W |
| Ile de Batz | United Kingdom | 17 March 1942 | A cargo ship that was torpedoed by U-68 about 24 nmi (45 km; 28 mi) southwest of Cape Palmas, Liberia. | 4°4′N 8°4′W |
| Infanta Maria Teresa | United States Navy | 1 November 1898 | A captured Infanta Maria Teresa-class armored cruiser abandoned during a tropical storm while under tow in Crooked Island Passage in the Bahamas. Subsequently drifted 55 nautical miles (102 km; 63 mi) before going hard aground between two coral reefs off Cat Island in the Bahamas less than 1 nautical mile (1.9 km; 1.2 mi) south of Bird Point. | |
| Ioanna | Greece | 1 June 1940 | A cargo ship that was sunk with gunfire by U-37 about 120 nmi (220 km; 140 mi) west of Cape Finisterre, Spain. | |
| Irish Pine | Ireland | 16 November 1942 | A cargo ship that was torpedoed by U-608. | 42°45′N 58°00′W |
| Jack Carnes | United States Navy | 31 August 1942 | An American steam tanker that sank after being torpedoed by U-705. | 41°35′N 29°01′W |
| USS Jacob Jones | United States Navy | 6 December 1917 | A Tucker-class destroyer torpedoed near the Isles of Scilly just west of the English Channel by the Imperial German Navy submarine U-53. | 49°23′N 006°13′W |
| USS Jacob Jones | United States Navy | 28 February 1942 | A Wickes-class destroyer torpedoed off Cape May, New Jersey, by the German submarine U-578. | 38°37′N 074°32′W |
| Jean Bart | French Navy | 11 February 1907 | A Jean Bart-class protected cruiser wrecked on an uncharted reef off the coast of Spanish Sahara near Cape Blanc. | |
| HMS Jervis Bay | Royal Navy | 5 November 1940 | An auxiliary cruiser that was sunk by Admiral Scheer 755 nmi (1,398 km; 869 mi) southwest of Reykjavík, Iceland. | 53°41′N 32°17′W |
| Justicia | United Kingdom | 20 July 1918 | A troopship that was torpedoed by U-boats northwest of Malin Head, Ireland. | |
| K-219 | Soviet Navy | 6 October 1986 | Sank (after an alleged collision with USS Augusta) due to an explosion in a missile tube and a fire, which disabled the submarine and led to evacuation. The boat sank with her two nuclear reactor plants, 16 SS-N-6 liquid-fueled missiles, and 34 nuclear warheads. | 31°25′N 54°42′W |
| SMS Karlsruhe | Imperial German Navy | 4 November 1914 | A Karlsruhe-class light cruiser that suffered an internal explosion southeast of Barbados. | 11°07′00″N 55°25′00″W |
| Keltier | Belgium | 2 October 1918 | A cargo ship that was torpedoed by U-55 near the Bay of Biscay. | 46°16′N 9°52′W |
| HMS King Edward VII | Royal Navy | 6 January 1916 | A King Edward VII-class battleship that struck a mine off Cape Wrath, Scotland. | |
| Kingston Hill | United Kingdom | 8 June 1941 | A cargo ship that was torpedoed by U-38 southwest of the Cape Verde Islands. | 9°21′N 21°24′W |
| La Psyché | French Navy | 8 November 1942 | A Diane-class submarine sunk at her moorings at Casablanca, French Morocco, by United States Navy dive bomber aircraft during the Naval Battle of Casablanca. | 33°06′30″N 007°36′58″W |
| RMS Laconia (1911) | United Kingdom | 25 February 1917 | An ocean liner that was torpedoed by U-50 160 nautical miles west of Ireland. | 52°0′N 13°40′W |
| RMS Laconia (1921) | United Kingdom | 12 September 1942 | An ocean liner that was torpedoed by U-156 about 110 nmi (210 km; 130 mi) northeast of Ascension Island. Upon realising there were civilians and prisoners of war aboard, the U-boat attempted to rescue the survivors, but was bombed by US aircraft in the Laconia incident. Around 1,649 people died. | 5°5′S 11°38′W |
| Lady Elizabeth | Norway | 17 February 1936 | A barque that was damaged off Cape Horn in 1913, and condemned. It went on to serve as a coal hulk in the Falkland Islands, until it broke its moorings and drifted into Stanley Harbour during a storm. | |
| RMS Lady Hawkins | United Kingdom | 19 January 1942 | An ocean liner that was torpedoed by U-66 off Cape Hatteras. | 35°00′N 72°18′W |
| Lady of the Lake | United Kingdom | 11 May 1833 | A brig that was struck by ice and sank about 220 nmi (400 km; 250 mi) east of Cape St. Francis, Canada. | 46°50′N 47°10′W |
| Laertes | Netherlands | 3 May 1942 | A merchant ship that was torpedoed by U-109 southeast of Cape Canaveral. It was carrying a cargo which included 3 aircraft, 17 medium tanks along with 20 trucks. | 28°21′N 80°23′W |
| Lambridge | United Kingdom | 30 December 1945 | An armed merchantman that was scuttled northwest of County Donegal, Ireland, with a cargo of chemical ammunition. | 55°18′N 11°00′W |
| USS Lancetfish | United States Navy | 15 March 1945 | A Balao-class submarine that accidentally sank pierside at the Boston Navy Yard in Boston, Massachusetts. | |
| Languedoc | United Kingdom | 17 October 1940 | A tanker that was torpedoed by U-48 about 140 nmi (260 km; 160 mi) northwest of Rockall. | 59°14′N 17°51′W |
| Laurentic (1909) | United Kingdom | 25 January 1917 | An ocean liner that was converted into an armed merchant cruiser service in 1915, and struck two mines off Lough Swilly. | 55°15′43″N 6°49′05″W |
| Laurentic (1927) | United Kingdom | 3 November 1940 | An ocean liner that was torpedoed by U-99 off Gweedore, Ireland. | 54°9′N 13°44′W |
| Le Conquérant | French Navy | 13 November 1942 | A Redoutable-class submarine sunk by United States Navy PBY Catalina flying boats off Cisneros in Río de Oro, about 700 nautical miles (1,300 km; 810 mi) southwest of Casablanca, French Morocco, during the Naval Battle of Casablanca. | |
| Le Tonnant | French Navy | 15 November 1942 | A Redoutable-class submarine scuttled off Cádiz, Spain, during the Naval Battle of Casablanca. | |
| SMS Leipzig | Imperial German Navy | 8 December 1914 | A Bremen-class light cruiser that was sunk by HMS Cornwall and HMS Glasgow in the Battle of the Falkland Islands. | 53°55′S 55°12′W |
| Leonardo da Vinci | Regia Marina | 24 May 1943 | An Italian Marconi-class submarine that was sunk by British ships 260 nmi (480 km; 300 mi) west of Vigo, Spain. | 42°16′0″N 15°40′0″W |
| USS Leopold | United States Navy | 10 March 1944 | An Edsall-class destroyer escort that was torpedoed by U-255. | 57°37′0″N 26°30′0″W |
| Leukos | Ireland | 9 March 1940 | A fishing trawler that was torpedoed by U-38 off the coast of Ireland. | 55°57′N 9°15′W |
| USS Leyden | United States Navy | 21 January 1903 | A armed tug that foundered off Block Island off the coast of Rhode Island. | |
| NRP Limpopo | Portuguese Navy | 4 May 2006 | A decommissioned patrol vessel sunk as a target in the Atlantic Ocean by three hits by RIM-7M Sea Sparrow missiles fired by the frigate NRP Vasco da Gama (Portuguese Navy) and the frigate German frigate Mecklenburg-Vorpommern (German Navy) and two hits by Standard SM-1 missiles fired by the frigate Canarias (Spanish Navy). | |
| Louise Lykes | United States | 9 January 1943 | A Type C2-F ship that was torpedoed by U-384 about 430 nmi (800 km; 500 mi) southeast of Iceland. | 56°15′N 22°0′W |
| Lulworth Hill | United Kingdom | 19 March 1943 | A cargo ship that was torpedoed by Italian submarine Leonardo da Vinci off the west coast of Africa. | 10°10′S 01°00′E |
| LV-117 | United States Lighthouse Service | 15 May 1934 | A lightship sunk in a collision with the British ocean liner RMS Olympic south of Nantucket Island, Massachusetts. | 40°37′02″N 069°37′06″W |
| Maasdam | Netherlands | 27 June 1941 | A cargo liner that was torpedoed by U-564. | 60°00′N 30°35′W |
| Mae | United States | 17 September 1942 | A cargo ship that was torpedoed by U-515 off Georgetown, British Guiana. | 8°3′N 58°13′W |
| Manistee | United Kingdom | 24 February 1941 | A merchant ship that was torpedoed by U-107 south of Iceland. | 58°55′N 20°50′W |
| Mantola | United Kingdom | 9 February 1917 | A steamship that was torpedoed by U-81 124 nmi (230 km; 143 mi) of Fastnet Rock, Ireland. | |
| Manx King | Norway | 8 July 1918 | An iron-hulled barque stopped and scuttled by the German submarine U-156 during a voyage between New York and Rio de Janeiro. Crew were rescued. | 40°05′N 52°00′W |
| HMS Mashona | Royal Navy | 28 May 1941 | A Tribal-class destroyer that was sunk by German aircraft off the coast of Galway, Ireland. | 52°58′N 11°36′W |
| USS Mason | United States Navy | 18 October 1941 | A Clemson-class destroyer that was torpedoed by U-101 about 350 nmi (640 km; 400 mi) south of Iceland. | 57°1′N 19°8′W |
| USS McCalla | United States Navy | 19 December 1941 | A Clemson-class destroyer that was torpedoed by U-574. | 38°12′N 17°23′W |
| Méduse | French Navy | 10 November 1942 | A Diane-class submarine beached and scuttled at Mazagan, French Morocco, north of Cape Blanco, during the Naval Battle of Casablanca. | 33°25′N 008°40′W |
| Melbourne Star | United Kingdom | 2 April 1943 | A cargo liner that was torpedoed by U-129. | 28°05′N 57°30′W |
| USCGC Mendota | United States Coast Guard | 31 January 1942 | A Lake-class cutter that was torpedoed by U-105 southwest of Ireland. | 48°43′N 20°14′W |
| Meriwether Lewis | United States | 3 March 1943 | A Liberty ship that was torpedoed by U-634. | 62°10′N 28°25′W |
| Michael E | United Kingdom | 28 May 1941 | A CAM ship that was torpedoed on her maiden voyage by U-108. | 48°30′N 29°00′W |
| USS Monitor | United States Navy | 31 December 1862 | A monitor that sank in a storm while under tow about 16 nmi (30 km; 18 mi) southeast of Cape Hatteras, North Carolina. | 35°00′06″N 075°24′23″W |
| HMS Montagu | Royal Navy | 30 May 1906 | A Duncan-class battleship wrecked on Lundy Island. | |
| Montanan | United States | 18 August 1918 | A cargo ship that was torpedoed by U-90 520 nmi (970 km; 600 mi) west of Le Verdon-sur-Mer, France. | 46°47′N 13°42′W |
| Mount Temple | United Kingdom | 6 December 1916 | Scuttled by German commerce raider SMS Möwe. | |
| USCGC Muskeget | United States Coast Guard | 9 September 1942 | A weather ship torpedoed about 400 nautical miles (740 km; 460 mi) east of Newfoundland by the German submarine U-755, the only U.S. weather ship lost during World War II. | |
| Navemar | Spain | 24 January 1942 | A cargo ship that was sunk by the Italian Marcello-class submarine Barbarigo. The ship would notably take a 1941 voyage going from Seville to Havana and then to the United States taking 1,120 passengers most of whom were Jewish refugees fleeing from countries occupied by Germany. During this voyage the ship would have poor conditions while high prices were charged for the trip. | 26°46′N 15°28′W |
| USS Nicholson | United States Navy | 30 July 2004 | A Spruance-class destroyer sunk as a target. | |
| Norge | Denmark | 28 June 1904 | Ran aground on Hasselwood Rock, Helen's Reef, close to Rockall, in foggy weather. Sank in 12 minutes with a loss of 635 persons. | |
| Nottingham | United Kingdom | 7 November 1941 | A cargo ship that was torpedoed by U-74. | 53°24′N 31°51′W |
| Numancia | Spanish Navy | 17 December 1916 | A decommissioned coastal defense ship, formerly an armoured frigate, that was wrecked on rocks off the Setúbal District near Sesimbra, Portugal, during a gale while under tow to a scrapyard. | |
| O-9 | United States Navy | 20 June 1941 | An O-class submarine that sank in a diving accident east of the Isle of Shoals, 15 nautical miles (28 km; 17 mi) off Portsmouth, New Hampshire. | 43°00′18″N 070°20′36″W |
| USS O'Bannon | United States Navy | 6 October 2008 | A Spruance-class destroyer sunk as a target off Virginia. | |
| Oliva | Malta | 16 March 2011 | A bulk carrier that ran aground off Nightingale Island, causing an oil spill. | 37°25′19″S 12°28′37″W |
| NRP Oliveira e Carmo | Portuguese Navy | 30 October 2012 | A decommissioned corvette scuttled as an artificial reef off Portimão, Portugal. | |
| Ondine | French Navy | 3 October 1928 | An Ariane-class submarine sunk in a collision off Vigo, Spain. | 42°00′N 009°06′W |
| Oropesa | United Kingdom | 16 January 1941 | A troopship that was torpedoed by U-96 northwest of Ireland. | 56°17′N 12°00′W |
| Otway | United Kingdom | 23 July 1917 | An ocean liner that was torpedoed by UC-49 off the Hebrides. | 58°54′N 6°28′W |
| Pamir | West Germany | 21 September 1957 | A four-masted barque that capsized and sank in Hurricane Carrie 600 nautical miles (1,100 km; 690 mi) west-southwest of the Azores. | 35°57′N 40°20′W |
| Pan-Pennsylvania | United States | 16 April 1944 | A tanker that was torpedoed by U-550. | 40°23′N 69°36′W |
| Pan Royal | United States | 7 February 1943 | A cargo ship that was accidentally rammed by Evita and George Davis near Virginia. | 36°40′N 67°20′W |
| Papoose | United Kingdom | 18 March 1942 | An oil tanker that was torpedoed by U-124 near Oregon Inlet, North Carolina. | 34°17′N 76°39′W |
| HMS Paxton | Royal Navy | 20 May 1917 | A Q-ship that was torpedoed by U-46 southwest of Ireland. | 51°42′N 13°13′W |
| Peleus | Greece | 13 March 1944 | A steamship that was torpedoed by U-852 about 430 nmi (800 km; 500 mi) north of Ascension Island. | |
| Pengreep | United Kingdom | 2 July 1945 | A cargo ship that was scuttled north west of Scotland with a cargo of gas bombs. | 58°00′09″N 11°00′00″W |
| Perle | Free French Naval Forces | 8 July 1944 | A Saphir-class submarine sunk by a Fairey Swordfish aircraft from the British merchant aircraft carrier Empire MacCallum after the Swordfish crew mistook her for a German U-boat. | 55°27′N 30°50′W |
| USS Peterson | United States Navy | 16 February 2004 | A Spruance-class destroyer sunk as a target in the western North Atlantic Ocean. | |
| HMS Picotee | Royal Navy | 12 August 1941 | A Flower-class corvette that was torpedoed by U-568. | 62°N 18°W |
| Pink Star | Panama | 3 September 1941 | A cargo ship that was sunk by U-552. | 61°36′N 35°7′W |
| USS Plymouth | United States Navy | 5 August 1943 | A gunboat that was torpedoed by U-566 about 78 nmi (140 km; 90 mi) east of Elizabeth City, North Carolina. | 36°17′N 74°29′W |
| Point Pleasant Park | Canada | 23 February 1945 | A Park ship that was sunk by U-510 and U-532 about 430 nmi (800 km; 500 mi) northwest of Cape Town, South Africa. | 29°42′S 009°58′E |
| HMS Polyanthus | Royal Navy | 20 September 1943 | A Flower-class corvette that was torpedoed by U-982. | 57°0′0″N 31°6′0″W |
| Polybius | United States | 27 June 1942 | Torpedoed by the German submarine U-128 about 220 nmi (400 km; 250 mi) east of Trinidad. The ship sank within ten minutes. | 10°55′N 57°40′W |
| Port Nicholson | United Kingdom | 16 June 1942 | A refrigerator ship sunk by U-87 off Portland. | 42°11′N 69°25′W |
| Portland | United States | 27 November 1898 | A sidewheel paddle steamer that sank off Cape Ann, Massachusetts, during the Portland Gale. | |
| USNS Potomac | United States Navy | 26 September 1961 | A Maumee-class oiler destroyed by fire and explosions at Morehead City, North Carolina. | |
| Potrero del Llano | Mexico | 14 May 1942 | A steam tanker that was torpedoed by U-564. | 25°35′N 80°06′W |
| USS President Lincoln | United States Navy | 31 May 1918 | A troopship that was torpedoed by U-90. | 47°57′N 15°11′W |
| Primrose Hill | United Kingdom | 29 October 1942 | A CAM ship that was torpedoed by UD-5 northwest of the Cape Verde Islands. | 18°58′N 28°40′W |
| Princesa | Spain | 17 November 1992 | A decommissioned Atrevida-class corvette was sunk as a target in the Atlantic Ocean off Galicia, Spain. | |
| Principessa Mafalda | Italy | 25 October 1927 | An ocean liner that foundered and sank off the coast of Brazil; despite the presence of rescue vessels, confusion and panic resulted in the deaths of 314 of the 1,252 passengers and crew. | 16°56′S 37°46′W |
| Prins Harald | Norway | 20 November 1942 | A cargo ship that was torpedoed by U-263 west of Gibraltar. | 35°55′N 10°14′W |
| Putney Hill | United Kingdom | 26 June 1942 | A cargo ship that was torpedoed by U-203 about 390 nmi (720 km; 450 mi) east of Puerto Rico. | 24°12′N 63°10′W |
| USS R-8 | United States Navy | 19 August 1936 | An R-class submarine sunk as an aerial bombing target 71 nautical miles (131 km; 82 mi) off Cape Henry, Virginia. | |
| HMS Rajputana | Royal Navy | 13 April 1941 | An armed merchant cruiser torpedoed by the German submarine U-108 in the Denmark Strait. | 65°50′N 27°25′W |
| HMS Raleigh | Royal Navy | 8 August 1922 | A Hawkins-class heavy cruiser wrecked in the Strait of Belle Isle at L'Anse Amour, Labrador. | |
| HMS Rawalpindi | Royal Navy | 23 November 1939 | An armed merchantman that was sunk by Scharnhorst and Gneisenau northwest of the Faroe Islands. | 63°23′59″N 12°18′36″W |
| USS Rehoboth | United States Navy | 4 October 1917 | A patrol vessel that sprang an uncontrollable leak and was scuttled by gunfire by the British light cruiser HMS Castor. | |
| Reina Regente | Spanish Navy | 10 March 1895 | A Reina Regente-class protected cruiser that sank in a storm in the Gulf of Cádiz. | |
| RMS Republic | United Kingdom | 24 January 1909 | An ocean liner that sank after a collision with Florida. | 40°26′0″N 69°46′0″W |
| USS Reuben James | United States Navy | 31 October 1941 | A Clemson-class destroyer torpedoed by the German submarine U-552. | 51°59′N 27°05′W |
| Ro-501 | Imperial Japanese Navy | 13 May 1944 | A Type IXC/40 submarine sunk by the United States Navy destroyer escort USS Francis M. Robinson west-northwest of the Cape Verde Islands. | 18°07′59″N 33°12′59″W |
| USCS Robert J. Walker | United States Coast Survey | 21 June 1860 | A survey ship that sank off New Jersey 12 nautical miles (22 km; 14 mi) southeast of Absecon Inlet Light after colliding with the schooner Fanny . | 39.27904°N 074.25659°W |
| Robin Moor | United States | 21 May 1941 | A steamship that was torpedoed by U-69. | 6°10′N 25°40′W |
| HMS Roebuck | Royal Navy | 23 February 1701 | A fifth rate that was wrecked at Ascension Island. | |
| Rosario | United States | 21 February 1943 | An American steam tanker that sank after being torpedoed by U-664. | 50°30′N 24°38′W |
| Rudyard Kipling | United Kingdom | 16 September 1939 | A fishing trawler that was sunk by U-27 about 35 nmi (64 km; 40 mi) west of Clare Island, Ireland. | 53°50′N 11°10′W |
| USS S-4 | United States Navy | 17 December 1927 | An S-class submarine sunk in a collision with the United States Coast Guard destroyer USCGC Paulding off Provincetown, Massachusetts. | |
| USS S-5 | United States Navy | 1 September 1920 | An S-class submarine that sank in a diving accident 55 nautical miles (102 km; 63 mi) off the Delaware Capes. Later refloated, but sank again under tow 15 nautical miles (28 km; 17 mi) off Cape May, New Jersey, on 3 September 1920. | |
| USS S-19 | United States Navy | 13 January 1925 | An S-class submarine that ran aground on the southern coast of Cape Cod at Chatham, Massachusetts. | |
| USS S-51 | United States Navy | 25 September 1925 | An S-class submarine sunk in a collision off Block Island off the coast of Rhode Island. | 41°14′30″N 071°16′16″W |
| USS Samuel Gompers | United States Navy | 22 July 2003 | A Samuel Gompers-class destroyer tender that sank off North Carolina after use the previous day as a target. | 31°17′N 073°51′W |
| San Demetrio | United Kingdom | 17 March 1942 | A tanker that was torpedoed by U-404 northwest of Cape Charles, Virginia. | 37°3′N 73°50′W |
| USS San Diego | United States Navy | 19 July 1918 | A Pennsylvania-class armored cruiser sunk by a mine off Long Island, New York. | 40°33′0.36″N 073°00′28.39″W |
| ARA Santa Fe | Argentine Navy | 10 February 1985 | A Balao-class submarine that was sunk by British aircraft in the Falklands War. It was later raised, towed out to sea and scuttled. | 54°10′59″S 36°22′32″W |
| Santa María | Castile | 24 December 1492 | A carrack — the flagship of Christopher Columbus — that was wrecked on a sandbar off Hispaniola near what is now Cap-Haïtien, Haiti. She sank the following day. | |
| Santa Rita | United States | 9 July 1942 | A refrigerated cargo ship that was torpedoed by U-172 about 700 nmi (1,300 km; 810 mi) northeast of Puerto Rico. | 26°11′N 55°40′W |
| Santore | United States | 17 June 1942 | A merchant ship that sank after hitting a mine laid by U-701. Its wreck would be sold to be scrapped in August 1954. | 36°52′N 75°51′W |
| USS Satterlee | United States Navy | 31 January 1942 | A Clemson-class destroyer that was torpedoed by U-82 south of Newfoundland. | 42°02′N 57°18′W |
| USS SC-209 | United States Navy | 27 August 1918 | An SC-1-class submarine chaser mistakenly sunk by gunfire by the American armed cargo ship Felix Taussig south of Long Island, New York. | 40°08′N 073°12′W |
| Scoresby | United Kingdom | 17 October 1940 | A merchant ship that was torpedoed by U-48 about 140 nmi (260 km; 160 mi) northwest of Rockall. | 59°14′N 17°51′W |
| USS Scorpion | United States Navy | 22 May 1968 | A US nuclear submarine equipped with two nuclear warheads and one nuclear reactor. The cause of its sinking was never determined; one theory is that an overheated torpedo exploded in the tube. | |
| USS Seneca | United States Navy | 21 July 2003 | A Navajo-class fleet tug sunk as a target off North Carolina. | |
| Sizergh Castle | United Kingdom | 7 October 1939 | A cargo ship that sprang a leak and foundered. | 45°15′N 44°6′W |
| Snefjeld | Norway | 19 October 1940 | A merchant ship that was torpedoed by U-99. | 57°28′N 11°10′W |
| Soesterberg | Netherlands | 19 October 1940 | A merchant vessel that was torpedoed by U-101 about 89 nmi (164 km; 102 mi) northwest of Barra Head, Outer Hebrides. | 57°12′N 10°43′W |
| Somersby | United Kingdom | 13 May 1941 | A merchant vessel that was torpedoed by U-111 southwest of Reykjavík, Iceland. | 60°39′N 26°13′W |
| HMT Southland | Royal Navy | 4 June 1917 | An ocean liner that was torpedoed by U-70 northwest of Ireland. | 56°10′N 12°14′W |
| HMCS Spikenard | Royal Canadian Navy | 10 February 1942 | A Flower-class corvette that was torpedoed by U-136. | 50°10′N 21°07′W |
| Spreewald | Germany | 31 January 1942 | A cargo ship mistakenly torpedoed by U-333. | 45°12′N 24°50′W |
| USS Spruance | United States Navy | 8 December 2006 | A Spruance-class destroyer sunk as a target off the Virginia Capes. | |
| Stag Hound | United States | 3 March 1943 | A refrigerated cargo ship that was torpedoed by the Italian submarine Barbarigo. | 16°44′S 36°33′W |
| Steel Navigator | United States | 17 June 1942 | An American merchant ship that sank after being torpedoed by U-610. | 49°45′N 31°20′W |
| Stellar Daisy | Marshall Islands | 31 March 2017 | A very large ore carrier that sank off the coast of Uruguay | |
| Stier | Kriegsmarine | 27 September 1942 | An auxiliary cruiser that was sunk by Stephen Hopkins. | 28°8′0″S 11°59′0″W |
| Stockport | United Kingdom | 23 February 1943 | A convoy rescue ship that was torpedoed by U-604. | 47°22′N 34°10′W |
| USS Stump | United States Navy | 7 June 2006 | A Spruance-class destroyer sunk as a target 275 nautical miles (509 km; 316 mi) off North Carolina. | |
| Suffren | French Navy | 26 November 1916 | A battleship torpedoed by the Imperial German Navy submarine U-52 off the coast of Portugal near Lisbon. | 39.3°N 11.0°W |
| USCGC Tampa | United States Coast Guard | 26 September 1918 | A Miami-class cutter torpedoed by the Imperial German Navy submarine UB-91 while entering the Bristol Channel. | 50°40′N 006°19′W |
| USS Thorn | United States Navy | 22 August 1974 | A Gleaves-class destroyer that was sunk as a target 65 nmi (121 km; 75 mi) east of Florida. | |
| USS Thorn | United States Navy | 22 July 2006 | A Spruance-class destroyer sunk as a target east of North Carolina. | 32°59′04″N 75°06′54″W |
| USS Thresher | United States Navy | 10 April 1963 | A nuclear-powered attack submarine that sank during deep-diving trials with the loss of all hands on board. Flooding had led to a reactor shutdown, and the sailors were unable to surface due to a malfunction in the emergency blow system. The wreck lies on the seafloor with one nuclear reactor in place. | 41°46′N 65°03′W |
| Thurso | United Kingdom | 15 June 1942 | A steamship that was torpedoed by U-552 about 300 nmi (560 km; 350 mi) west of Cape Finisterre, Spain. | 43°41′N 18°2′W |
| Titan | United States | 18 June 2023 | A deep-sea submersible which imploded during a dive to the wreck of RMS Titanic. On 22 June, the United States Coast Guard announced the discovery of Titan′s wreckage about 1,600 feet (490 m) from Titanic′s bow. | 41°43′57″N 49°56′49″W |
| Titanic | United Kingdom | 15 April 1912 | The largest passenger ship in the world when she sank with over 1,500 lives lost. She sank and broke in half over the course of two hours, following a collision with an iceberg. | 41°43′57″N 49°56′49″W |
| Tokuyama Maru | Japan | 2 August 1918 | A steamer sunk by U-140 during World War I. | 39°12′N 70°23′W |
| Tower Grange | United Kingdom | 18 November 1942 | A cargo ship that was torpedoed by U-154 about 460 km (290 mi) northwest of Cayenne, French Guiana. | 6°12′N 49°06′W |
| Tregenna | United Kingdom | 9 September 1940 | A steamship that was sunk by U-65 about 68 nmi (126 km; 78 mi) northwest of Rockall. | 58°22′N 15°42′W |
| Trepca | Kingdom of Yugoslavia | 13 March 1942 | A Yugoslavian merchant ship that was torpedoed by U-332. | 37°00′N 73°25′W |
| SM U-27 | Imperial German Navy | 18 October 1914 | A Type U-27 submarine that was sunk by HMS Baralong in the Western Approaches. | 50°43′N 07°22′W |
| U-27 | Kriegsmarine | 20 September 1939 | A Type VIIA U-boat that was sunk by HMS Fortune and HMS Faulknor west of Lewis, Scotland. | 58°35′N 09°02′W |
| U-32 | Kriegsmarine | 30 October 1940 | A Type VIIA U-boat that was sunk by HMS Harvester and HMS Highlander northwest of Ireland. | 55°37′N 12°19′W |
| U-39 | Kriegsmarine | 14 September 1939 | A Type IXA U-boat that was sunk by HMS Faulknor, HMS Firedrake, and HMS Foxhound, becoming the first U-boat to be sunk in World War II. | 58°32′N 11°49′W |
| SM U-41 | Imperial German Navy | 24 September 1915 | A Type U 31 submarine that was sunk in the Second Baralong Incident. | 49°10′N 7°20′W |
| U-41 | Kriegsmarine | 5 February 1940 | A Type IXA U-boat that was sunk by HMS Antelope southwest of Ireland. | 49°20′N 10°04′W |
| U-42 | Kriegsmarine | 13 October 1939 | A Type IXA U-boat that was sunk by HMS Imogen and HMS Ilex southwest of Ireland. | 49°12′N 16°00′W |
| U-43 | Kriegsmarine | 30 July 1943 | A Type IXA U-boat that was sunk by a US bomber southwest of the Azores. | 34°57′N 35°11′W |
| U-45 | Kriegsmarine | 14 October 1939 | A Type VIIB U-boat that was sunk by HMS Inglefield, HMS Ivanhoe, and HMS Intrepid southwest of Ireland. | 50°58′N 12°57′W |
| U-53 | Kriegsmarine | 23 February 1940 | A Type VIIB U-boat that was sunk by HMS Gurkha near the Orkney Islands. | 60°32′00″N 6°14′00″W |
| U-55 | Kriegsmarine | 30 January 1940 | A Type VIIB U-boat that was sunk by HMS Fowey and HMS Whitshed. | 48°37′N 7°48′W |
| U-65 | Kriegsmarine | 28 April 1941 | A Type IXB U-boat that was sunk by HMS Douglas near Narvik, Norway. | 60°4′N 15°45′W |
| U-66 | Kriegsmarine | 16 May 1944 | A Type IXC U-boat that was sunk by USS Buckley and US aircraft, west of the Cape Verde Islands. | 17°17′N 32°29′W |
| U-68 | Kriegsmarine | 10 April 1944 | A Type IXC U-boat that was sunk by US aircraft northwest of Madeira, Portugal. | 33°24′N 18°59′W |
| U-70 | Kriegsmarine | 7 March 1941 | A Type VIIC U-boat that was sunk by HMS Camellia and HMS Arbutus. | 60°15′N 14°00′W |
| SM U-81 | Imperial German Navy | 1 May 1917 | A Type U 81 submarine that was torpedoed by HMS E54 west of Ireland. | 51°33′N 13°38′W |
| SM U-83 | Imperial German Navy | 17 February 1917 | A Type U 81 submarine that was sunk by HMS Farnborough west of Ireland. | 51°34′N 11°23′W |
| U-89 | Kriegsmarine | 12 May 1943 | A Type VIIC U-boat that was sunk by HMS Broadway and British aircraft. | 46°30′N 25°40′W |
| U-90 | Kriegsmarine | 24 July 1942 | A Type VIIC U-boat that was sunk by USS McCook east of Newfoundland. | 48°12′N 40°56′W |
| U-98 | Kriegsmarine | 15 November 1942 | A Type VIIC U-boat that was sunk by HMS Wrestler west of Gibraltar. | 36°09′N 7°42′W |
| U-100 | Kriegsmarine | 17 March 1941 | A Type VIIB U-boat that was sunk by HMS Vanoc. | 61°04′N 11°30′W |
| U-102 | Kriegsmarine | 1 July 1940 | A Type VIIB U-boat that was sunk by HMS Vansittart southwest of Ireland. | 48°33′N 10°26′W |
| U-110 | Kriegsmarine | 9 May 1941 | A Type IXB U-boat that was captured by British forces, who retrieved from it a number of secret cipher documents. It sank under tow the following day. | 60°22′N 33°12′W |
| U-111 | Kriegsmarine | 4 October 1941 | A Type IXB U-boat that was sunk by HMS Lady Shirley southwest of Tenerife. | 27°10′N 20°24′W |
| U-118 | Kriegsmarine | 12 June 1943 | A Type IXB U-boat that was sunk by US aircraft west of the Canary Islands. | 30°49′N 33°49′W |
| U-119 | Kriegsmarine | 24 June 1943 | A Type IXB U-boat that was sunk by HMS Starling west of the Bay of Biscay. | 44°59′N 12°24′W |
| U-124 | Kriegsmarine | 2 April 1943 | A Type IXB U-boat that was sunk by HMS Black Swan and HMS Stonecrop. | 41°02′N 15°39′W |
| U-125 | Kriegsmarine | 6 May 1943 | A Type IXC U-boat that was rammed by HMS Oribi and scuttled. | 52°30′N 45°20′W |
| U-127 | Kriegsmarine | 15 December 1941 | A Type IXC U-boat that was sunk by HMAS Nestor west of Gibraltar. | 36°28′N 09°12′W |
| U-128 | Kriegsmarine | 17 May 1943 | A Type IXC U-boat that was sunk by USS Jouett and USS Moffett. | 10°00′00″N 35°34′59″W |
| U-130 | Kriegsmarine | 12 March 1943 | A Type IXC U-boat that was sunk by USS Champlin west of the Azores. | 37°10′N 40°21′W |
| U-131 | Kriegsmarine | 17 December 1941 | A Type IXC U-boat that was scuttled while under attack by British forces. | 34°12′N 13°35′W |
| U-134 | Kriegsmarine | 24 August 1943 | A Type VIIC U-boat that was sunk by British aircraft near Vigo, Spain. | 42°07′N 09°30′W |
| U-135 | Kriegsmarine | 15 July 1943 | A Type VIIC U-boat that was sunk by Allied forces east of the Canary Islands. | 28°20′N 13°17′W |
| U-136 | Kriegsmarine | 11 July 1942 | A Type VIIC U-boat that was sunk by Allied forces west of Madeira. | 33°30′N 22°52′W |
| U-143 | Kriegsmarine | 22 December 1945 | A Type IID U-boat that was scuttled northwest of Ireland as part of Operation Deadlight. | 55°58′N 09°35′W |
| U-145 | Kriegsmarine | 22 December 1945 | A Type IID U-boat that was scuttled northwest of Ireland as part of Operation Deadlight. | 55°47′N 09°56′W |
| U-149 | Kriegsmarine | 21 December 1945 | A Type IID U-boat that was scuttled northwest of Ireland as part of Operation Deadlight. | 55°40′N 08°00′W |
| U-150 | Kriegsmarine | 21 December 1945 | A Type IID U-boat that was scuttled northwest of Ireland as part of Operation Deadlight. | 56°04′N 09°35′W |
| U-154 | Kriegsmarine | 3 July 1944 | A Type IXC U-boat that was sunk by USS Inch and USS Frost northwest of Madeira, Portugal. | 34°00′N 19°30′W |
| U-156 | Kriegsmarine | 8 March 1943 | A Type IXC U-boat that was sunk by US aircraft east of Barbados. | 12°38′N 54°39′W |
| U-158 | Kriegsmarine | 30 June 1942 | A Type IXC U-boat that was sunk by US aircraft west of the Bermudas. | 32°50′N 67°28′W |
| U-160 | Kriegsmarine | 14 July 1943 | A Type IXC U-boat that was sunk by US aircraft south of the Azores. | 33°54′N 27°13′W |
| U-161 | Kriegsmarine | 27 September 1943 | A Type IXC U-boat that was sunk by an American aircraft near Bahia, Brazil. | 12°30′S 35°35′W |
| U-162 | Kriegsmarine | 3 September 1942 | A Type IXC U-boat that was sunk by British destroyers northeast of Trinidad. | 12°21′N 59°29′W |
| U-163 | Kriegsmarine | 13 March 1943 | A Type IXC U-boat that was sunk by HMCS Prescott northeast of Cape Finisterre, Spain. | 45°05′N 15°00′W |
| U-164 | Kriegsmarine | 6 January 1943 | A Type IXC U-boat that was sunk by an American aircraft northwest of Pernambuco, Brazil. | 01°58′S 39°22′W |
| U-165 | Kriegsmarine | 27 September 1942 | A Type IXC U-boat that was sunk by a British aircraft in the Bay of Biscay. | 47°00′N 05°30′W |
| U-169 | Kriegsmarine | 27 March 1943 | A Type IXC/40 U-boat that was sunk by a British aircraft south of Iceland. | 60°54′N 15°25′W |
| U-170 | Kriegsmarine | 30 November 1945 | A Type IXC/40 U-boat that was scuttled north of Ireland as part of Operation Deadlight. | 55°44′N 07°53′W |
| U-172 | Kriegsmarine | 13 December 1943 | A Type IXC U-boat that was sunk by US forces west of the Canary Islands. | 26°28′59″N 29°58′01″W |
| U-174 | Kriegsmarine | 16 November 1942 | A Type IXC U-boat that was sunk by an American aircraft southwest of Newfoundland, Canada. | 43°35′N 56°18′W |
| U-175 | Kriegsmarine | 17 April 1943 | A Type IXC U-boat that was sunk by USCGC Spencer. | 47°53′N 22°04′W |
| U-185 | Kriegsmarine | 24 August 1943 | A Type IXC/40 U-boat that was sunk by US aircraft. | 27°00′N 37°06′W |
| U-186 | Kriegsmarine | 12 May 1943 | A Type IXC/40 U-boat that was sunk by HMS Hesperus northwest of the Azores. | 41°54′N 31°49′W |
| U-187 | Kriegsmarine | 4 February 1943 | A Type IXC/40 U-boat that was sunk by HMS Vimy and HMS Beverley. | 50°12′N 36°35′W |
| U-189 | Kriegsmarine | 23 April 1943 | A Type IXC/40 U-boat that was sunk by a British aircraft east of Cape Farewell, Greenland. | 59°50′N 34°43′W |
| U-194 | Kriegsmarine | 24 June 1943 | A Type IXC/40 U-boat that was sunk by US aircraft. | 59°00′N 26°18′W |
| U-208 | Kriegsmarine | 7 December 1941 | A Type VIIC U-boat that was sunk by HMS Hesperus and HMS Harvester west of Gibraltar. | 35°51′N 07°45′W |
| U-215 | Kriegsmarine | 3 July 1942 | A Type VIID U-boat that was sunk off the Canadian coast. | 41°28′47.9″N 66°22′47.9″W |
| U-216 | Kriegsmarine | 20 October 1942 | A Type VIID U-boat that was sunk by British aircraft southwest of Ireland. | 48°21′N 19°25′W |
| U-217 | Kriegsmarine | 5 June 1943 | A Type VIID U-boat that was sunk by USS Bogue. | 30°18′N 042°50′W |
| U-220 | Kriegsmarine | 28 October 1943 | A Type XB U-boat that was sunk by American aircraft. | 48°53′N 33°30′W |
| U-226 | Kriegsmarine | November 1943 | A Type VIIC U-boat that was sunk by HMS Starling, HMS Woodcock and HMS Kite. | 44°49′N 41°13′W |
| U-231 | Kriegsmarine | 13 January 1944 | A Type VIIC U-boat that was sunk by a British aircraft northeast of the Azores. | 44°15′N 20°38′W |
| U-232 | Kriegsmarine | 8 July 1943 | A Type VIIC U-boat that was sunk by an American aircraft west of Portugal. | 40°37′N 13°41′W |
| U-238 | Kriegsmarine | 9 February 1944 | A Type VIIC U-boat that was sunk by HMS Kite, HMS Magpie and HMS Starling, 230 nmi (430 km; 270 mi) off Cape Clear Island. | 49°27′N 16°04′W |
| U-242 | Kriegsmarine | 5 April 1945 | A Type VIIC U-boat that was sunk by a mine in St. George's Channel. | 52°02′N 05°46′W |
| U-243 | Kriegsmarine | 8 July 1944 | A Type VIIC U-boat that was sunk by an Australian aircraft in the Bay of Biscay. | 47°06′N 06°40′W |
| U-244 | Kriegsmarine | 14 May 1945 | A Type VIIC U-boat that was scuttled north of Ireland as part of Operation Deadlight. | 55°46′N 08°32′W |
| U-245 | Kriegsmarine | 7 December 1945 | A Type VIIC U-boat that was scuttled northeast of Ireland as part of Operation Deadlight. | 55°25′N 06°19′W |
| U-248 | Kriegsmarine | 16 January 1945 | A Type VIIC U-boat that was sunk by American destroyer escorts. | 47°43′N 26°37′W |
| U-249 | Kriegsmarine | 13 December 1945 | A Type VIIC U-boat that was scuttled northwest of Ireland as part of Operation Deadlight. | 56°10′N 10°05′W |
| U-254 | Kriegsmarine | 8 December 1942 | A Type VIIC U-boat that collided with U-221. | 55°0′N 40°0′W |
| U-257 | Kriegsmarine | 24 February 1944 | A Type VIIC U-boat that was sunk by HMCS Waskesiu and HMS Nene. | 47°19′N 26°00′W |
| U-261 | Kriegsmarine | 15 September 1942 | A Type VIIC U-boat that was sunk by a British aircraft west of the Shetland Islands. | 59°50′N 09°28′W |
| U-264 | Kriegsmarine | 19 February 1944 | A Type VIIC U-boat that was sunk by HMS Woodpecker and HMS Starling. | 48°31′N 22°05′W |
| U-265 | Kriegsmarine | 3 February 1943 | A Type VIIC U-boat that was sunk by a British aircraft south of Iceland. | 56°35′N 22°49′W |
| U-266 | Kriegsmarine | 15 May 1943 | A Type VIIC U-boat that was sunk by a British aircraft west of the Bay of Biscay. | 45°28′N 10°20′W |
| U-270 | Kriegsmarine | 13 August 1944 | A Type VIIC U-boat that was sunk by an Australian aircraft in the Bay of Biscay. | 46°19′N 02°56′W |
| U-271 | Kriegsmarine | 28 January 1944 | A Type VIIC U-boat that was sunk by an American aircraft west of Ireland. | 53°15′N 15°52′W |
| U-273 | Kriegsmarine | 19 May 1943 | A Type VIIC U-boat that was sunk by British aircraft southwest of Iceland. | 59°25′N 24°33′W |
| U-274 | Kriegsmarine | 23 October 1943 | A Type VIIC U-boat that was sunk by HMS Duncan and HMS Vidette southwest of Iceland. | 57°14′N 27°50′W |
| U-278 | Kriegsmarine | 31 December 1945 | A Type VIIC U-boat that was scuttled northwest of Ireland as part of Operation Deadlight. | 55°44′N 08°21′W |
| U-279 | Kriegsmarine | 4 October 1943 | A Type VIIC U-boat that was sunk by an American aircraft southwest of Iceland. | 60°40′N 26°30′W |
| U-280 | Kriegsmarine | 16 November 1943 | A Type VIIC U-boat that was sunk by British aircraft southwest of Iceland. | 49°11′N 27°32′W |
| U-281 | Kriegsmarine | 30 November 1945 | A Type VIIC U-boat that was scuttled northwest of Ireland as part of Operation Deadlight. | 55°50′N 10°05′W |
| U-283 | Kriegsmarine | 11 February 1944 | A Type VIIC U-boat that was sunk by a Canadian aircraft southwest of the Faroe Islands. | 60°45′N 12°50′W |
| U-284 | Kriegsmarine | 21 November 1943 | A Type VIIC U-boat that foundered and was scuttled southeast of Greenland. | 55°04′N 30°23′W |
| U-285 | Kriegsmarine | 15 April 1945 | A Type VIIC U-boat that was sunk by HMS Grindall and HMS Keats southwest of Ireland. | 50°13′N 12°48′W |
| U-291 | Kriegsmarine | 20 December 1945 | A Type VIIC U-boat that was scuttled northwest of Ireland as part of Operation Deadlight. | 55°50′N 09°08′W |
| U-293 | Kriegsmarine | 13 December 1945 | A Type VIIC/41 U-boat that was scuttled northwest of Ireland as part of Operation Deadlight. | 55°50′N 10°05′W |
| U-294 | Kriegsmarine | 31 December 1945 | A Type VIIC/41 U-boat that was scuttled northwest of Ireland as part of Operation Deadlight. | 55°44′N 08°40′W |
| U-295 | Kriegsmarine | 17 December 1945 | A Type VIIC/41 U-boat that was scuttled northwest of Ireland as part of Operation Deadlight. | 56°14′N 10°37′W |
| U-299 | Kriegsmarine | 4 December 1945 | A Type VIIC/41 U-boat that was scuttled north of Ireland as part of Operation Deadlight. | 55°38′N 07°54′W |
| U-300 | Kriegsmarine | 22 February 1945 | A Type VIIC/41 U-boat that was sunk by British forces west of Cádiz, Spain. | 36°29′N 08°20′W |
| U-302 | Kriegsmarine | 6 April 1944 | A Type VIIC U-boat that was sunk by HMS Swale northwest of the Azores. | 45°05′N 35°11′W |
| U-305 | Kriegsmarine | 16 January 1944 | A Type VIIC U-boat that was sunk, probably by her own torpedo, west of the Bay of Biscay. | 49°N 18°W |
| U-306 | Kriegsmarine | 31 October 1943 | A Type VIIC U-boat that was sunk by HMS Whitehall and HMS Geranium northwest of the Azores. | 46°19′N 20°44′W |
| U-311 | Kriegsmarine | 24 April 1944 | A Type VIIC U-boat that was sunk by HMCS Matane and HMCS Swansea west of Ireland. | 52°09′N 19°07′W |
| U-312 | Kriegsmarine | 29 November 1945 | A Type VIIC U-boat that was scuttled north of Ireland as part of Operation Deadlight. | 55°35′N 07°54′W |
| U-313 | Kriegsmarine | 27 December 1945 | A Type VIIC U-boat that was scuttled north of Ireland as part of Operation Deadlight. | 55°40′N 08°24′W |
| U-318 | Kriegsmarine | 21 December 1945 | A Type VIIC/41 U-boat that was scuttled north of Ireland as part of Operation Deadlight. | 55°47′N 08°30′W |
| U-321 | Kriegsmarine | 2 April 1945 | A Type VIIC/41 U-boat that was sunk by a Polish aircraft southwest of Ireland. | 50°00′N 12°57′W |
| U-326 | Kriegsmarine | 25 April 1942 | A Type VIIC/41 U-boat that was sunk by an American aircraft in the Bay of Biscay. | 48°12′N 05°42′W |
| U-328 | Kriegsmarine | 30 November 1945 | A Type VIIC/41 U-boat that was scuttled northwest of Ireland as part of Operation Deadlight. | 55°50′N 10°05′W |
| U-333 | Kriegsmarine | 31 July 1944 | A Type VIIC U-boat that was sunk by HMS Starling and HMS Loch Killin west of the Isles of Scilly. | 49°39′N 07°28′W |
| U-334 | Kriegsmarine | 14 June 1943 | A Type VIIC U-boat that was sunk by HMS Jed and HMS Pelican southwest of Iceland. | 58°16′N 28°20′W |
| U-336 | Kriegsmarine | 5 October 1942 | A Type VIIC U-boat that was sunk by a British aircraft southwest of Iceland. | 62°43′N 27°17′W |
| U-340 | Kriegsmarine | 2 November 1943 | A Type VIIC U-boat that was sunk by British forces west of the Strait of Gibraltar. | 35°33′N 6°37′W |
| U-341 | Kriegsmarine | 19 September 1943 | A Type VIIC U-boat that was sunk by a Canadian aircraft southwest of Iceland. | 58°34′N 25°30′W |
| U-342 | Kriegsmarine | 17 April 1944 | A Type VIIC U-boat that was sunk by a Canadian aircraft southwest of Iceland. | 60°32′N 29°20′W |
| U-353 | Kriegsmarine | 16 October 1942 | A Type VIIC U-boat that was sunk by HMS Fame. | 53°54′N 29°30′W |
| U-357 | Kriegsmarine | 26 December 1942 | A Type VIIC U-boat that was sunk by HMS Hesperus and HMS Vanessa northwest of Ireland. | 57°10′N 15°40′W |
| U-358 | Kriegsmarine | 1 March 1944 | A Type VIIC U-boat that was sunk by British frigates north of the Azores. | 45°46′N 23°16′W |
| U-363 | Kriegsmarine | 31 December 1945 | A Type VIIC U-boat that was scuttled north of Ireland as part of Operation Deadlight. | 55°45′N 08°18′W |
| U-364 | Kriegsmarine | 30 January 1944 | A Type VIIC U-boat that was sunk by a British aircraft in the Bay of Biscay. | 45°33′N 05°55′W |
| U-368 | Kriegsmarine | 17 December 1945 | A Type VIIC U-boat that was scuttled northwest of Ireland as part of Operation Deadlight. | 56°14′N 10°37′W |
| U-369 | Kriegsmarine | 30 November 1945 | A Type VIIC U-boat that was scuttled north of Ireland as part of Operation Deadlight. | 55°31′N 07°27′W |
| U-373 | Kriegsmarine | 8 June 1944 | A Type VIIC U-boat that was sunk by a British aircraft west of Brest, France. | 48°10′N 05°31′W |
| U-378 | Kriegsmarine | 20 October 1943 | A Type VIIC U-boat that was sunk by American aircraft. | 47°40′N 28°27′W |
| U-383 | Kriegsmarine | 1 August 1943 | A Type VIIC U-boat that was sunk by British aircraft. | 47°24′N 12°10′W |
| U-384 | Kriegsmarine | 19 March 1943 | A Type VIIC U-boat that was sunk by a British aircraft. | 54°18′N 26°15′W |
| U-386 | Kriegsmarine | 19 February 1944 | A Type VIIC U-boat that was sunk by HMS Spey. | 48°51′N 22°44′W |
| U-388 | Kriegsmarine | 20 June 1943 | A Type VIIC U-boat that was sunk by British aircraft southeast of Cape Farewell, Greenland. | 57°36′N 31°20′W |
| U-389 | Kriegsmarine | 4 October 1943 | A Type VIIC U-boat that was sunk by a British aircraft southwest of Iceland. | 60°51′N 28°26′W |
| U-391 | Kriegsmarine | 13 December 1941 | A Type VIIC U-boat that was sunk by a British aircraft northwest of Cape Ortegal, Spain. | 45°45′N 09°38′W |
| U-401 | Kriegsmarine | 3 August 1941 | A Type VIIC U-boat that was sunk by HMS Wanderer, HMS St. Albans and HMS Hydrangea southwest of Ireland. | 50°27′N 19°50′W |
| U-403 | Kriegsmarine | 18 August 1943 | A Type VIIC U-boat that was sunk by a British aircraft west of Dakar, Senegal. | 13°25′N 17°22′W |
| U-417 | Kriegsmarine | 11 June 1943 | A Type VIIC U-boat that was sunk by a British aircraft southeast of Iceland. | 63°20′N 10°30′W |
| U-418 | Kriegsmarine | 1 June 1943 | A Type VIIC U-boat that was sunk by a British aircraft northwest of Cape Ortegal, Spain. | 47°05′N 08°55′W |
| U-419 | Kriegsmarine | 8 October 1943 | A Type VIIC U-boat that was sunk by a British aircraft. | 56°31′N 27°05′W |
| U-422 | Kriegsmarine | 4 October 1943 | A Type VIIC U-boat that was sunk by American aircraft north of the Azores. | 45°13′N 28°58′W |
| U-424 | Kriegsmarine | 11 February 1944 | A Type VIIC U-boat that was sunk by HMS Wild Goose and HMS Woodpecker southwest of Ireland. | 50°00′N 18°14′W |
| U-426 | Kriegsmarine | 8 January 1944 | A Type VIIC U-boat that was sunk by an Australian aircraft west of Nantes, France. | 46°47′N 10°42′W |
| U-432 | Kriegsmarine | 11 March 1943 | A Type VIIC U-boat that was sunk by the French Navy corvette Aconit. | 51°35′N 28°20′W |
| U-434 | Kriegsmarine | 18 December 1941 | A Type VIIC U-boat that was sunk by HMS Blankney and USS McCalla north of Madeira, Portugal. | 36°15′N 15°48′W |
| U-436 | Kriegsmarine | 26 May 1943 | A Type VIIC U-boat that was sunk by HMS Test and HMS Hyderabad west of Cape Ortegal, Spain. | 43°49′N 15°56′W |
| U-438 | Kriegsmarine | 6 May 1943 | A Type VIIC U-boat that was sunk by HMS Pelican northwest of Newfoundland, Canada. | 52°00′N 45°10′W |
| U-439 | Kriegsmarine | 4 May 1943 | A Type VIIC U-boat that collided with U-659 west of Cape Ortegal, Spain. | 43°32′N 13°20′W |
| U-444 | Kriegsmarine | 11 March 1943 | A Type VIIC U-boat that was sunk by the French Navy corvette Aconit and the Royal Navy destroyer HMS Harvester. | 51°14′N 29°18′W |
| U-445 | Kriegsmarine | 24 August 1944 | A Type VIIC U-boat that was sunk by HMS Louis in the Bay of Biscay. | 47°21′N 05°50′W |
| U-448 | Kriegsmarine | 14 April 1943 | A Type VIIC U-boat that was sunk by HMCS Swansea and HMS Pelican northwest of the Azores. | 46°22′N 19°35′W |
| U-449 | Kriegsmarine | 24 June 1943 | A Type VIIC U-boat that was sunk by British ships northwest of Cape Ortegal, Spain. | 45°00′N 11°59′W |
| U-452 | Kriegsmarine | 25 August 1941 | A Type VIIC U-boat that was sunk by HMS Vascama and a British aircraft southeast of Iceland. | 61°30′N 15°30′W |
| U-454 | Kriegsmarine | 1 August 1943 | A Type VIIC U-boat that was sunk by an Australian aircraft northwest of Cape Ortegal, Spain. | 45°36′N 10°23′W |
| U-460 | Kriegsmarine | 4 October 1943 | A Type XIV U-boat that was sunk by US aircraft north of the Azores. | 43°18′N 28°58′W |
| U-461 | Kriegsmarine | 30 July 1943 | A Type XIV U-boat that was sunk by Australian aircraft northwest of Cape Ortegal, Spain. | 45°33′N 10°48′W |
| U-462 | Kriegsmarine | 30 July 1943 | A Type XIV U-boat that was sunk by British forces northwest of Cape Ortegal, Spain. | 45°33′N 10°58′W |
| U-463 | Kriegsmarine | 16 May 1943 | A Type XIV U-boat that was sunk by British aircraft northwest of Cape Ortegal, Spain. | 45°57′N 11°40′W |
| U-465 | Kriegsmarine | 2 May 1943 | A Type VIIC U-boat that was sunk by an Australian aircraft north of Cape Finisterre, Spain. | 44°48′N 08°58′W |
| U-467 | Kriegsmarine | 25 May 1943 | A Type VIIC U-boat that was sunk by an American aircraft southeast of Iceland. | 62°25′N 14°52′W |
| U-468 | Kriegsmarine | 11 August 1943 | A Type VIIC U-boat that was sunk by US aircraft southwest of Dakar, Senegal. | 12°20′N 20°07′W |
| U-469 | Kriegsmarine | 25 March 1943 | A Type VIIC U-boat that was sunk by a British aircraft south of Iceland. | 62°12′N 16°40′W |
| U-473 | Kriegsmarine | 6 May 1944 | A Type VIIC U-boat that was sunk by HMS Starling, HMS Wren and HMS Wild Goose. | 49°29′N 21°22′W |
| U-483 | Kriegsmarine | 16 December 1945 | A Type VIIC U-boat that was sunk northwest of Ireland as part of Operation Deadlight. | 56°10′N 10°05′W |
| U-484 | Kriegsmarine | 9 September 1944 | A Type VIIC U-boat that was sunk by HMS Portchester Castle and HMS Helmsdale northwest of Ireland. | 55°45′N 11°41′W |
| U-485 | Kriegsmarine | 8 December 1945 | A Type VIIC U-boat that was sunk north of Ireland as part of Operation Deadlight. | 56°10′N 10°05′W |
| U-487 | Kriegsmarine | 13 July 1943 | A Type XIV U-boat that was sunk by US aircraft. | 27°15′N 34°18′W |
| U-488 | Kriegsmarine | 26 April 1944 | A Type XIV U-boat that was sunk by US destroyers west of Cape Verde. | 17°54′N 38°05′W |
| U-489 | Kriegsmarine | 4 August 1943 | A Type XIV U-boat that was sunk by Allied forces southeast of Iceland. | 61°11′N 14°38′W |
| U-490 | Kriegsmarine | 12 June 1944 | A Type XIV U-boat that was sunk by US forces northwest of the Azores. | 42°47′N 40°08′W |
| U-501 | Kriegsmarine | 10 September 1941 | A Type IXC U-boat that was sunk by HMCS Chambly south of Tasiilaq, Greenland. | 62°50′N 37°50′W |
| U-502 | Kriegsmarine | 6 July 1942 | A Type IXC U-boat that was sunk by British aircraft west of La Rochelle, France. | 46°10′N 06°40′W |
| U-503 | Kriegsmarine | 15 March 1942 | A Type IXC U-boat that was sunk by US aircraft. | 45°50′N 48°50′W |
| U-504 | Kriegsmarine | 30 July 1943 | A Type IXC U-boat that was sunk by British sloops northwest of Cape Ortegal, Spain. | 45°33′N 10°56′W |
| U-507 | Kriegsmarine | 13 January 1943 | A Type IXC U-boat that was sunk by US aircraft. | 1°37′59″N 39°52′01″W |
| U-508 | Kriegsmarine | 12 November 1943 | A Type IXC U-boat that was sunk by an American aircraft north of Cape Ortegal, Spain. | 46°00′N 07°30′W |
| U-509 | Kriegsmarine | 15 July 1943 | A Type IXC U-boat that was sunk by US aircraft northwest of Madeira, Portugal. | 34°02′N 26°01′W |
| U-512 | Kriegsmarine | 2 October 1942 | A Type IXC U-boat that was sunk by US aircraft off the South American coast. | 6°50′N 52°25′W |
| U-513 | Kriegsmarine | 19 July 1943 | A Type IXC U-boat that was sunk by US aircraft off the South American coast. | 27°17′S 47°32′W |
| U-515 | Kriegsmarine | 9 April 1944 | A Type IXC U-boat that was sunk by US forces north of Madeira, Portugal. | 34°34′59″N 19°18′00″W |
| U-516 | Kriegsmarine | 2 January 1946 | A Type IXC U-boat that was sunk north of Ireland as part of Operation Deadlight. | 56°06′N 09°00′W |
| U-517 | Kriegsmarine | 21 November 1942 | A Type IXC U-boat that was sunk by British aircraft west of the Bay of Biscay. | 46°16′N 17°09′W |
| U-518 | Kriegsmarine | 22 April 1945 | A Type IXC U-boat that was sunk by USS Carter and USS Neal A. Scott northwest of the Azores. | 43°26′N 38°23′W |
| U-522 | Kriegsmarine | 23 February 1943 | A Type IXC U-boat that was sunk by HMS Totland. | 31°27′N 26°22′W |
| U-523 | Kriegsmarine | 25 August 1943 | A Type IXC U-boat that was sunk by British ships west of Vigo, Spain. | 42°03′N 18°02′W |
| U-524 | Kriegsmarine | 22 March 1943 | A Type IXC U-boat that was sunk by an American aircraft north of Tenerife. | 30°15′N 18°13′W |
| U-525 | Kriegsmarine | 11 August 1943 | A Type IXC/40 U-boat that was sunk by American aircraft northwest of the Azores. | 41°29′N 38°55′W |
| U-527 | Kriegsmarine | 23 July 1943 | A Type IXC/40 U-boat that was sunk by American aircraft south of the Azores. | 35°25′N 27°56′W |
| U-528 | Kriegsmarine | 11 May 1943 | A Type IXC/40 U-boat that was sunk by HMS Fleetwood and a British aircraft. | 46°55′N 14°44′W |
| U-531 | Kriegsmarine | 6 May 1943 | A Type IXC/40 U-boat that was sunk by HMS Vidette. | 52°48′00″N 45°18′00″W |
| U-532 | Kriegsmarine | 9 December 1945 | A Type IXC/40 U-boat that was scuttled northwest of Ireland as part of Operation Deadlight. | 56°08′N 10°07′W |
| U-535 | Kriegsmarine | 5 July 1943 | A Type IXC/40 U-boat that was sunk by British aircraft northeast of Cape Finisterre, Spain. | 43°38′N 09°13′W |
| U-536 | Kriegsmarine | 20 November 1943 | A Type IXC/40 U-boat that was sunk by HMS Nene, HMCS Snowberry and HMCS Calgary. | 43°50′N 19°39′W |
| U-538 | Kriegsmarine | 21 November 1943 | A Type IXC/40 U-boat that was sunk by HMS Foley and HMS Crane. | 45°40′N 19°35′W |
| U-540 | Kriegsmarine | 17 October 1943 | A Type IXC/40 U-boat that was sunk by British aircraft. | 58°38′N 31°56′W |
| U-541 | Kriegsmarine | 5 January 1946 | A Type IXC/40 U-boat that was sunk north of Ireland as part of Operation Deadlight. | 55°38′N 07°35′W |
| U-542 | Kriegsmarine | 28 November 1943 | A Type IXC/40 U-boat that was sunk by a British aircraft west of Portugal. | 39°03′N 16°25′W |
| U-543 | Kriegsmarine | 2 July 1944 | A Type IXC/40 U-boat that was sunk by American aircraft southwest of Tenerife. | 25°34′N 21°36′W |
| U-544 | Kriegsmarine | 16 January 1944 | A Type IXC/40 U-boat that was sunk by American aircraft northwest of the Azores. | 40°30′N 37°20′W |
| U-545 | Kriegsmarine | 10 February 1944 | A Type IXC/40 U-boat that was attacked by a British aircraft and subsequently scuttled west of the Hebrides. | 58°17′N 13°22′W |
| U-546 | Kriegsmarine | 24 April 1945 | A Type IXC/40 U-boat that was sunk by US destroyer escorts southeast of Cape Farewell, Greenland. | 43°53′N 40°07′W |
| U-548 | Kriegsmarine | 19 April 1945 | A Type IXC/40 U-boat that was sunk by USS Reuben James and USS Buckley southeast of Nova Scotia, Canada. | 42°19′N 61°45′W |
| U-549 | Kriegsmarine | 29 May 1944 | A Type IXC/40 U-boat that was sunk by USS Ahrens and USS Eugene E. Elmore northwest of the Canary Islands. | 31°13′N 23°03′W |
| U-551 | Kriegsmarine | 23 March 1941 | A Type VIIC U-boat that was sunk by depth charges south of Iceland. | 62°37′N 16°47′W |
| U-556 | Kriegsmarine | 27 June 1941 | A Type VIIC U-boat that was sunk by British corvette southwest of Iceland. | 60°24′N 20°00′W |
| U-563 | Kriegsmarine | 31 May 1943 | A Type VIIC U-boat that was sunk by Allied aircraft west of the Bay of Biscay. | 46°35′N 10°40′W |
| U-566 | Kriegsmarine | 24 October 1943 | A Type VIIC U-boat that was attacked by British aircraft and scuttled. | 41°12′N 9°31′W |
| U-569 | Kriegsmarine | 22 May 1943 | A Type VIIC U-boat that was attacked by American aircraft and scuttled. | 50°40′N 35°21′W |
| U-574 | Kriegsmarine | 19 December 1941 | A Type VIIC U-boat that was attacked by HMS Stork and scuttled west of Portugal. | 38°12′N 17°23′W |
| U-575 | Kriegsmarine | 13 March 1944 | A Type VIIC U-boat that was sunk by HMCS Prince Rupert, USS Hobson, USS Haverfield and Allied aircraft. | 46°18′N 27°34′W |
| U-576 | Kriegsmarine | 15 July 1942 | A Type VIIC U-boat that was sunk by American aircraft and the motor vessel Unicoi near Cape Hatteras, North Carolina. | 34°51′N 75°22′W |
| U-581 | Kriegsmarine | 2 February 1942 | A Type VIIC U-boat that was sunk by HMS Westcott near the Azores. | 39°00′N 30°00′W |
| U-582 | Kriegsmarine | 5 October 1942 | A Type VIIC U-boat that was sunk by an American aircraft. | 58°52′N 21°42′W |
| U-588 | Kriegsmarine | 31 July 1942 | A Type VIIC U-boat that was sunk by HMCS Wetaskiwin and HMCS Skeena. | 49°59′N 36°36′W |
| U-590 | Kriegsmarine | 9 July 1943 | A Type VIIC U-boat that was sunk by an American aircraft east of Amapá, Brazil. | 03°22′N 48°38′W |
| U-592 | Kriegsmarine | 31 January 1944 | A Type VIIC U-boat that was sunk by HMS Starling, HMS Wild Goose and HMS Magpie. | 50°20′N 17°29′W |
| U-597 | Kriegsmarine | 12 October 1942 | A Type VIIC U-boat that was sunk by a British aircraft. | 56°50′N 28°05′W |
| U-598 | Kriegsmarine | 23 July 1943 | A Type VIIC U-boat that was sunk by American aircraft northeast of Natal, Brazil. | 04°05′S 33°23′W |
| U-599 | Kriegsmarine | 24 October 1942 | A Type VIIC U-boat that was sunk by a British aircraft. | 46°07′N 17°40′W |
| U-607 | Kriegsmarine | 13 July 1943 | A Type VIIC U-boat that was sunk by British aircraft northwest of Galicia, Spain. | 45°02′N 9°14′W |
| U-610 | Kriegsmarine | 8 October 1943 | A Type VIIC U-boat that was sunk by a Canadian aircraft. | 55°45′N 24°33′W |
| U-611 | Kriegsmarine | 8 December 1942 | A Type VIIC U-boat that was sunk by a British aircraft. | 57°25′N 35°19′W |
| U-613 | Kriegsmarine | 23 July 1943 | A Type VIIC U-boat that was sunk by USS George E. Badger. | 35°32′N 28°36′W |
| U-619 | Kriegsmarine | 5 October 1942 | A Type VIIC U-boat that was sunk by British aircraft. | 58°41′N 22°58′W |
| U-620 | Kriegsmarine | 13 February 1943 | A Type VIIC U-boat that was sunk by a British aircraft west of Lisbon, Portugal. | 39°18′N 11°17′W |
| U-624 | Kriegsmarine | February 7, 1943 | A Type VIIC U-boat that was sunk by a British aircraft. | 55°42′N 26°17′W |
| U-625 | Kriegsmarine | 10 March 1944 | A Type VIIC U-boat that was sunk by Canadian aircraft west of Ireland. | 52°35′N 20°19′W |
| U-627 | Kriegsmarine | 27 October 1942 | A Type VIIC U-boat that was sunk by British aircraft south of Iceland. | 59°14′N 22°49′W |
| U-629 | Kriegsmarine | 7 June 1944 | A Type VIIC U-boat that was sunk by a British aircraft northwest of Ushant, France. | 48°34′N 05°23′W |
| U-631 | Kriegsmarine | 17 October 1943 | A Type VIIC U-boat that was sunk by HMS Sunflower. | 58°13′N 32°29′W |
| U-633 | Kriegsmarine | 10 March 1943 | A Type VIIC U-boat that was rammed by SS Scorton. | 58°51′N 19°55′W |
| U-634 | Kriegsmarine | 30 August 1943 | A Type VIIC U-boat that was sunk by HMS Stork and HMS Stonecrop. | 40°13′N 19°24′W |
| U-635 | Kriegsmarine | 5 April 1943 | A Type VIIC U-boat that was sunk by a British aircraft. | 58°20′N 31°52′W |
| U-636 | Kriegsmarine | 21 April 1945 | A Type VIIC U-boat that was sunk by British ships. | 55°50′N 10°31′W |
| U-638 | Kriegsmarine | 5 May 1943 | A Type VIIC U-boat that was sunk by HMS Sunflower. | 54°12′N 44°05′W |
| U-640 | Kriegsmarine | 14 May 1943 | A Type VIIC U-boat that was sunk by a US aircraft. | 60°32′N 31°05′W |
| U-641 | Kriegsmarine | 19 January 1944 | A Type VIIC U-boat that was sunk by HMS Violet. | 50°25′N 18°49′W |
| U-643 | Kriegsmarine | 8 October 1943 | A Type VIIC U-boat that came under attack from British aircraft and was scuttled. | 56°14′N 26°55′W |
| U-645 | Kriegsmarine | 24 December 1943 | A Type VIIC U-boat that was sunk by USS Schenck. | 45°20′N 21°40′W |
| U-646 | Kriegsmarine | 17 May 1943 | A Type VIIC U-boat that was sunk by a British aircraft southeast of Iceland. | 62°10′N 14°30′W |
| U-651 | Kriegsmarine | 29 June 1941 | A Type VIIC U-boat that was sunk by British ships south of Iceland. | 59°52′N 18°36′W |
| U-657 | Kriegsmarine | 17 May 1943 | A Type VIIC U-boat that was sunk by HMS Swale southeast of Cape Farewell, Greenland. | 58°54′N 42°33′W |
| U-658 | Kriegsmarine | 30 October 1942 | A Type VIIC U-boat that was sunk by a Canadian aircraft. | 50°32′N 46°32′W |
| U-663 | Kriegsmarine | 8 May 1943 | A Type VIIC U-boat that was sunk by a British aircraft. | 46°50′N 10°00′W |
| U-664 | Kriegsmarine | 9 August 1943 | A Type VIIC U-boat that was sunk by a US aircraft. | 40°12′N 37°29′W |
| U-665 | Kriegsmarine | 22 March 1943 | A Type VIIC U-boat that was sunk by a British aircraft. | 48°04′N 10°26′W |
| U-668 | Kriegsmarine | 31 December 1945 | A Type VIIC U-boat that was scuttled northwest of Ireland as part of Operation Deadlight. | 56°3′N 9°24′W |
| U-681 | Kriegsmarine | 11 March 1945 | A Type VIIC U-boat that was sunk by a British aircraft southwest of Land's End, England. | 49°53′N 6°31′W |
| U-706 | Kriegsmarine | 3 August 1943 | A Type VIIC U-boat that was sunk by Allied aircraft near the Bay of Biscay. | 46°15′N 10°25′W |
| U-707 | Kriegsmarine | 9 November 1943 | A Type VIIC U-boat that was sunk by a British aircraft northeast of the Azores. | 40°31′N 20°17′W |
| U-709 | Kriegsmarine | 1 March 1944 | A Type VIIC U-boat that was sunk by USS Thomas, USS Bostwick and USS Bronstein. | 49°10′N 26°00′W |
| U-710 | Kriegsmarine | 23 April 1943 | A Type VIIC U-boat that was sunk by a British aircraft south of Iceland. | 61°25′N 19°48′W |
| U-719 | Kriegsmarine | 26 June 1944 | A Type VIIC U-boat that was sunk by HMS Bulldog northwest of Ireland. | 55°33′N 11°2′W |
| U-720 | Kriegsmarine | 21 December 1945 | A Type VIIC U-boat that was scuttled northwest of Ireland as part of Operation Deadlight. | 56°4′N 9°35′W |
| U-734 | Kriegsmarine | 9 February 1944 | A Type VIIC U-boat that was sunk by HMS Wild Goose and HMS Starling. | 49°43′N 16°23′W |
| U-739 | Kriegsmarine | 16 December 1945 | A Type VIIC U-boat that was scuttled northwest of Ireland as part of Operation Deadlight. | 56°10′N 10°05′W |
| U-756 | Kriegsmarine | 1 September 1942 | A Type VIIC U-boat that was sunk by HMCS Morden. | 58°08′N 27°33′W |
| U-764 | Kriegsmarine | 2 February 1946 | A Type VIIC U-boat that was scuttled north of Ireland as part of Operation Deadlight. | 56°06′N 09°00′W |
| U-765 | Kriegsmarine | 6 May 1944 | A Type VIIC U-boat that was sunk by British aircraft. | 52°30′N 28°28′W |
| U-772 | Kriegsmarine | 17 December 1944 | A Type VIIC U-boat that was sunk by HMS Nyasaland south of Cork, Ireland. | 51°16′N 08°05′W |
| U-775 | Kriegsmarine | 8 December 1945 | A Type VIIC U-boat that was scuttled north of Ireland as part of Operation Deadlight. | 55°40′N 08°25′W |
| U-801 | Kriegsmarine | 17 March 1944 | A Type IXC/40 U-boat that was attacked by US forces and scuttled. | 16°42′N 30°28′W |
| U-805 | Kriegsmarine | 4 February 1946 | A Type IXC/40 U-boat that was surrendered to the US and scuttled off Cape Cod. | 42°32′N 69°37′W |
| U-841 | Kriegsmarine | 17 October 1943 | A Type IXC/40 U-boat that was scuttled after taking damage from Allied forces. | 59°57′N 31°6′W |
| U-842 | Kriegsmarine | 6 November 1943 | A Type IXC/40 U-boat that was sunk by British ships. | 43°42′N 42°8′W |
| U-844 | Kriegsmarine | 16 October 1943 | A Type IXC/40 U-boat that was sunk by Allied aircraft south of Iceland. | 58°30′N 27°16′W |
| U-845 | Kriegsmarine | 10 March 1944 | A Type IXC/40 U-boat that was scuttled after taking damage from British ships. | 48°20′N 20°33′W |
| U-846 | Kriegsmarine | 4 May 1944 | A Type IXC/40 U-boat that was sunk by Allied aircraft. | 46°4′N 9°20′W |
| U-847 | Kriegsmarine | 27 August 1943 | A Type IXD2 U-boat that was sunk by US aircraft. | 28°19′N 37°58′W |
| U-848 | Kriegsmarine | 5 November 1943 | A Type IXD2 U-boat that was sunk by US aircraft. | 10°09′S 18°00′W |
| U-849 | Kriegsmarine | 25 November 1943 | A Type IXD2 U-boat that was sunk by a US aircraft. | 06°30′S 05°40′W |
| U-850 | Kriegsmarine | 20 December 1943 | A Type IXD2 U-boat that was sunk by Allied aircraft. | 32°54′N 37°1′W |
| U-856 | Kriegsmarine | 7 April 1944 | A Type IXC/40 U-boat that was scuttled after taking damage from US ships. | 40°18′N 62°22′W |
| U-858 | Kriegsmarine | 1947 | A Type IXC/40 U-boat that was used as a target ship and then scuttled near New England. | 38°27′N 70°20′W |
| U-866 | Kriegsmarine | 18 March 1945 | A Type IXC/40 U-boat that was sunk by American destroyer escorts southeast of Nova Scotia, Canada. | 43°18′N 61°08′W |
| U-868 | Kriegsmarine | 30 November 1945 | A Type IXC/40 U-boat that was sunk north of Ireland as part of Operation Deadlight. | 55°48′N 08°33′W |
| U-877 | Kriegsmarine | 27 December 1944 | A Type IXC/40 U-boat that was sunk by HMCS St. Thomas northwest of the Azores. | 46°25′N 36°38′W |
| U-878 | Kriegsmarine | 10 April 1945 | A Type IXC/40 U-boat that was sunk by HMS Vanquisher and HMS Tintagel Castle. | 47°35′N 10°33′W |
| U-879 | Kriegsmarine | 30 April 1945 | A Type IXC/40 U-boat that was sunk by US ships. | 36°34′N 74°00′W |
| U-880 | Kriegsmarine | 16 April 1945 | A Type IXC/40 U-boat that was sunk by USS Frost and USS Stanton. | 47°53′N 30°26′W |
| U-881 | Kriegsmarine | 6 May 1945 | A Type IXC/40 U-boat that was sunk by USS Farquhar southeast of Newfoundland. | 43°18′N 47°44′W |
| U-954 | Kriegsmarine | 19 May 1943 | A Type VIIC U-boat that was sunk by HMS Sennen and HMS Jed southeast of Cape Farewell, Greenland. | 54°54′N 34°19′W |
| U-956 | Kriegsmarine | 17 December 1945 | A Type VIIC U-boat that was scuttled northwest of Ireland as part of Operation Deadlight. | 55°50′N 10°05′W |
| U-962 | Kriegsmarine | 8 April 1944 | A Type VIIC U-boat that was sunk by British sloops. | 45°43′N 19°57′W |
| U-984 | Kriegsmarine | 20 August 1944 | A Type VIIC U-boat that was sunk by HMCS Ottawa, HMCS Kootenay and HMCS Chaudiere. | 48°16′N 05°33′W |
| U-992 | Kriegsmarine | 16 December 1945 | A Type VIIC U-boat that was scuttled northwest of Ireland as part of Operation Deadlight. | 56°10′N 10°05′W |
| U-997 | Kriegsmarine | 13 December 1945 | A Type VIIC/41 U-boat that was scuttled northwest of Ireland as part of Operation Deadlight. | 55°50′N 10°05′W |
| U-1004 | Kriegsmarine | 1 December 1945 | A Type VIIC/41 U-boat that was scuttled northwest of Ireland as part of Operation Deadlight. | 56°10′N 10°05′W |
| U-1017 | Kriegsmarine | 29 April 1945 | A Type VIIC/41 U-boat that was sunk by a British aircraft northwest of Ireland. | 56°04′N 11°06′W |
| U-1059 | Kriegsmarine | 19 March 1944 | A Type VIIF U-boat that was sunk by US aircraft southwest of the Cape Verde Islands. | 13°06′N 33°26′W |
| U-1062 | Kriegsmarine | 30 September 1944 | A Type VIIF U-boat that was sunk by USS Fessenden southwest of the Cape Verde Islands. | 11°36′N 34°44′W |
| U-1107 | Kriegsmarine | 30 April 1945 | A Type VIIC/41 U-boat that was sunk by a US aircraft. | 48°00′N 06°30′W |
| U-1165 | Kriegsmarine | 30 December 1945 | A Type VIIC/41 U-boat that was scuttled northwest of Ireland as part of Operation Deadlight. | 55°44′N 08°40′W |
| U-1203 | Kriegsmarine | 8 December 1945 | A Type VIIC/ U-boat that was scuttled northwest of Ireland as part of Operation Deadlight. | 55°50′N 10°05′W |
| U-1208 | Kriegsmarine | 24 February 1945 | A Type VIIC U-boat that was sunk by HMS Duckworth and HMS Rowley. | 49°51′N 06°06′W |
| U-1229 | Kriegsmarine | 20 August 1944 | A Type IXC/40 U-boat that was sunk by Allied aircraft southeast of Newfoundland, Canada. | 42°20′N 51°39′W |
| U-1233 | Kriegsmarine | 29 December 1945 | A Type IXC/40 U-boat that was scuttled north of Ireland as part of Operation Deadlight. | 55°51′N 8°54′W |
| U-1276 | Kriegsmarine | 20 February 1945 | A Type VIIC/41 U-boat that was sunk by HMS Amethyst off Waterford, Ireland. | 51°48′N 07°07′W |
| U-2502 | Kriegsmarine | 9 May 1945 | A Type XXI U-boat that was scuttled northwest of Ireland as part of Operation Deadlight. | 56°06′N 09°00′W |
| U-2506 | Kriegsmarine | 5 January 1946 | A Type XXI U-boat that was scuttled northwest of Ireland as part of Operation Deadlight. | 55°37′N 07°30′W |
| UB-124 | Imperial German Navy | 20 July 1918 | A Type UB III U-boat that was sunk by British ships north of Ireland. | 55°43′N 7°51′W |
| Ultonia | United Kingdom | 27 June 1917 | A cargo ship that was torpedoed by UC-53 southwest of Ireland. | 48°25′00″N 11°23′00″W |
| Umona | United Kingdom | 30 March 1941 | A cargo liner that was torpedoed by U-124 southwest of Freetown. | 07°25′N 13°55′W |
| Ussukuma | Germany | 6 December 1939 | A passenger ship that was scuttled while under attack from HMS Ajax, 87 nmi (160 km; 100 mi) off Necochea, Argentina. | |
| HMCS Valleyfield | Royal Canadian Navy | 7 May 1944 | A River-class frigate that was torpedoed by U-548 southeast of St. John's, Newfoundland. | 46°03′N 52°24′W |
| HMS Vervain | Royal Navy | 20 February 1945 | A Flower-class corvette that was torpedoed by U-1276 about 22 nmi (40 km; 25 mi) southeast of Dungarvan, Ireland. | 51°47′N 7°6′W |
| HMS Veteran | Royal Navy | 26 September 1942 | A V-class destroyer that was torpedoed by U-404. | 54°34′N 25°44′W |
| NRP Vouga | Portuguese Navy | 1 May 1931 | A Guadiana-class destroyer that sank halfway between Madeira Island and Porto Santo Island in the Madeira Islands after colliding with the ocean liner Pedro Gomes (Portugal). | |
| Wahehe | United Kingdom | 3 February 1941 | A cargo ship that was torpedoed by U-107. | 58°12′N 23°22′W |
| HMS Warwick | Royal Navy | 20 January 1944 | A W-class destroyer that was torpedoed by U-413. | 49°11′N 13°38′W |
| USS Washington | United States Navy | 26 November 1924 | An incomplete Colorado-class battleship sunk as a gunnery target by the U.S. Navy battleships USS New York and USS Texas off the Virginia Capes. | |
| Washingtonian | United States | 26 January 1915 | A cargo ship that collided with Elizabeth Palmer off the Delaware coast. | 38°27′28″N 74°40′34″W |
| Wentworth | United Kingdom | 5 May 1943 | A cargo ship that was sunk by U-358 east of Newfoundland. | 53°59′N 43°55′W |
| USS West Gate | United States Navy | 7 October 1918 | A cargo ship that collided with the U.S. Navy cargo ship USS American 250 nmi (460 km; 290 mi) south of Halifax, Canada. | 40°35′N 63°48′W |
| West Lashaway | United States | 30 August 1942 | A cargo ship that was torpedoed by U-66. | 10°30′N 55°10′W |
| West Madaket | United States | 5 May 1943 | A cargo ship that was torpedoed by U-707, in an attack on Convoy ONS 5 which claimed 12 other Allied ships. | 55°8′N 42°43′W |
| West Maximus | United States Navy | 5 May 1943 | A cargo ship that was torpedoed by U-264 in an attack on Convoy ONS 5 that claimed 12 other Allied ships. | 55°10′N 43°0′W |
| Western Chief | United Kingdom | 14 March 1941 | A merchant ship that was sunk by the Italian Marcello-class submarine Emo south of Iceland. | 58°52′N 21°13′W |
| USS Westover | United States Navy | 11 July 1918 | A cargo ship that was torpedoed by SM U-92. | 46°36′N 12°21′W |
| HMS Whirlwind | Royal Navy | 5 July 1940 | A W-class destroyer that was sunk by U-34 southwest of Ireland. | 50°17′N 8°48′W |
| HMS Wild Swan | Royal Navy | 17 June 1942 | An Admiralty modified W-class destroyer that was attacked by German aircraft and collided with a Spanish trawler. | 49°52′N 10°44′W |
| Wilhelmina | United Kingdom | 2 December 1940 | A cargo ship that was requisitioned as a troopship by the US Navy during World War I. Torpedoed by U-94 when a British civilian cargo ship. | 55°43′N 15°6′W |
| Winnipeg II | Canada | 22 October 1942 | A steamship that was torpedoed by U-443. | 49°51′N 27°58′W |
| USS YP-389 | United States Navy | 19 June 1942 | A patrol boat that was sunk by U-701 about 17 nmi (32 km; 20 mi) off Cape Hatteras, North Carolina. | 34°50′0″N 75°19′59″W |
| NRP Zambeze | Portuguese Navy | 30 October 2012 | A decommissioned patrol vessel scuttled as an artificial reef off Portimão, Portugal. | |
| HMS Zinnia | Royal Navy | 23 August 1941 | A Flower-class corvette that was torpedoed by U-564 west of Portugal. | 40°25′N 10°40′W |
