= Prins Harald =

Prins Harald may refer to

- Crown Prince Harald of Norway
- MV Prins Harald, a World War II Norwegian cargo ship

See also

- Prins, Harald, Dutch anthropologist and film maker
