= SS Corinthic =

SS Corinthic may refer to:

- SS Corinthic (1902), an Athenic-class ocean liner built for White Star Line, sold in 1929 to Shaw, Savill & Albion Line and scrapped in 1931.
- SS Corinthic (1914), a cargo steamship that successively bore the names Thurland Castle, Hemisphere, Kohki Maru and finally Nanshin Maru.
- SS Corinthic (1924), a cargo steamship of W.H. Cockerline & Co that was sunk by German submarine U-124 in 1941.
