= HMCS Waskesiu =

River-class frigate of the Royal Canadian Navy

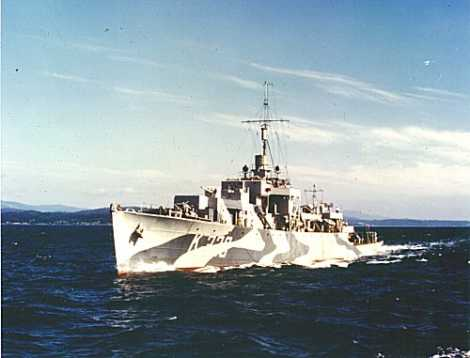
- HMCS Waskesiu

History

Canada
- Name: Waskesiu
- Namesake: Prince Albert, Saskatchewan
- Ordered: October 1941
- Builder: Yarrows Ltd., Esquimalt
- Laid down: 2 May 1942
- Launched: 3 April 1943
- Commissioned: 16 June 1943
- Decommissioned: 29 January 1946
- Identification: Pennant number: K 330
- Honours and awards: Atlantic 1943-45, Arctic 1944, Normandy 1944
- Fate: Sold to India, 1947

General characteristics
- Class & type: River-class frigate
- Displacement: 1,445 long tons (1,468 t; 1,618 short tons); 2,110 long tons (2,140 t; 2,360 short tons) (deep load)
- Length: 283 ft (86.26 m) p/p; 301.25 ft (91.82 m)o/a
- Beam: 36.5 ft (11.13 m)
- Draught: 9 ft (2.74 m); 13 ft (3.96 m) (deep load)
- Propulsion: 2 × Admiralty 3-drum boilers, 2 shafts, reciprocating vertical triple expansion, 5,500 ihp (4,100 kW)
- Speed: 20 knots (37.0 km/h); 20.5 knots (38.0 km/h) (turbine ships)
- Range: 646 long tons (656 t; 724 short tons) oil fuel; 7,500 nautical miles (13,890 km) at 15 knots (27.8 km/h)
- Complement: 157
- Armament: 2 × QF 4 in (102 mm) /45 Mk. XVI on twin mount HA/LA Mk.XIX; 1 × QF 12 pdr (3 in (76 mm)) 12 cwt /40 Mk. V on mounting HA/LA Mk.IX (not all ships); 8 × 20 mm QF Oerlikon A/A on twin mounts Mk.V; 1 × Hedgehog 24 spigot A/S projector; up to 150 depth charges

HMCS Waskesiu was a River-class frigate of the Royal Canadian Navy. The frigate served as a convoy escort in the Battle of the Atlantic during the Second World War. It was the first frigate constructed and commissioned into the Royal Canadian Navy. Following the war, the vessel was sold to India where it was renamed Hooghly. Named after the town of Prince Albert, Saskatchewan, there was already a warship named "Prince Albert". The Royal Canadian Navy then named the ship after the town closest to Prince Albert National Park.

Waskesiu was ordered in October 1941 as part of the initial 1942-1943 River-class building programme. The ship was laid down on 2 May 1942 by Yarrows Ltd. at Esquimalt, British Columbia and launched 3 April 1943. The frigate was commissioned into the Royal Canadian Navy on 16 June 1943 at Victoria, British Columbia with the pennant number K 330.

== Background ==
The River-class frigate was designed by William Reed of Smith's Dock Company of South Bank-on-Tees. Originally called a "twin-screw corvette", its purpose was to improve on the convoy escort classes in service with the Royal Navy at the time, including the Flower-class corvette. The first orders were placed by the Royal Navy in 1940 and the vessels were named for rivers in the United Kingdom, giving name to the class. In Canada they were named for towns and cities though they kept the same designation. The name "frigate" was suggested by Vice-Admiral Percy Nelles of the Royal Canadian Navy and was adopted later that year.

Improvements over the corvette design included improved accommodation which was markedly better. The twin engines gave 3 knots (5.6 km/h; 3.5 mph) more of speed but extended the range of the ship to nearly double that of a corvette at 7,200 nautical miles (13,300 km) at 12 knots (22 km/h; 14 mph). Among other lessons applied to the design was an armament package better designed to combat U-boats including a twin 4-inch (102 mm) mount forward and one 2-pounder gun aft. 15 Canadian frigates were initially fitted with a single 4-inch gun forward but with the exception of HMCS Valleyfield, they were all eventually upgraded to the double mount. For underwater targets, the River-class frigate was equipped with a Hedgehog anti-submarine mortar and depth charge rails aft and four side-mounted throwers.

River-class frigates were the first Royal Canadian Navy warships to carry the 147B Sword horizontal fan echo sonar transmitter in addition to the irregular ASDIC. This allowed the ship to maintain contact with targets even while firing unless a target was struck. Improved radar and direction-finding equipment improved the RCN's ability to find and track enemy submarines over the previous classes.

Canada originally ordered the construction of 33 frigates in October 1941. The design was too big for the shipyards on the Great Lakes so all the frigates built in Canada were built in dockyards along the west coast or along the St. Lawrence River. In all Canada ordered the construction of 60 frigates including ten for the Royal Navy that transferred two to the United States Navy.

== Service history ==
After commissioning, Waskesiu transferred to the east coast of Canada. From there, the frigate worked up in Bermuda, returning to Halifax, Nova Scotia on 11 September 1943. The vessel was assigned to convoy escort group EG 5 based out of Londonderry Port and sailed in October to join the group. The group was later renumbered EG 6 in November 1943.

This convoy escort group operated in the Atlantic Ocean, guarding the convoy routes between Gibraltar, Sierra Leone and Great Britain. On 7 January 1944, HMS Tweed was sunk by torpedo. Waskesiu screened HMS Nene while the frigate picked up survivors. On 24 February while escorting convoy SC 153, the group encountered the German submarine U-257. Waskesiu picked up a sonar contact and moved to engage. In concert with Nene, the contact was gained and lost four times. Ordered to give up the chase, Waskesiu was permitted one more attack, an attack which drove the damaged U-boat to the surface. Waskesiu opened fire with its main armament, scoring four hits on the submarine's conning tower. Eventually the sustained gunfire crippled the vessel, and the crew abandoned the sinking submarine. Waskesiu was the first Royal Canadian Navy frigate to score a U-boat kill. Supported by Nene, the two ships rescued survivors of U-257.

In April 1943, Waskesiu traveled to North Russia, escorting convoy RA 59 to Great Britain. In May the warship reported for invasion duty as EG 6 was assigned to cover the Invasion of Normandy. The task set for EG 6 was to perform an anti-submarine patrol guarding the western edge of the English Channel from Land's End to Brest, France.

On 14 September, Waskesiu departed for Canada as part of escort group C-3. Upon arrival, the frigate was ordered to Shelburne, Nova Scotia to begin an extensive refit. The refit was completed in March 1945 and workups were performed in Bermuda. Following the refit, Waskesiu returned to English waters, remaining until May 1945 when the frigate returned once again to Canada. Switching coasts, Waskesiu began a tropicalization refit for future service in the Pacific Ocean in June 1945 at Esquimalt. However, due to the end of the war in the Pacific, work was halted in August.

Waskesiu was paid off into reserve on 29 January 1946 at Esquimalt. Declared surplus, the frigate was sold to the Indian government in 1947 for conversion to a pilot vessel. In 1950, the ship was renamed Hooghly.
