= German submarine U-257 =

German World War II submarine

Coordinates: 47°19′N 26°00′W

History

Nazi Germany
- Name: U-257
- Ordered: 23 December 1939
- Builder: Bremer Vulkan, Bremen-Vegesack
- Yard number: 22
- Laid down: 22 February 1941
- Launched: 19 November 1941
- Commissioned: 14 January 1942
- Fate: Sunk on 24 February 1944

General characteristics
- Class & type: Type VIIC submarine
- Displacement: 769 tonnes (757 long tons) surfaced; 871 t (857 long tons) submerged
- Length: 67.10 m (220 ft 2 in) o/a; 50.50 m (165 ft 8 in) pressure hull
- Beam: 6.20 m (20 ft 4 in) o/a; 4.70 m (15 ft 5 in) pressure hull
- Height: 9.60 m (31 ft 6 in)
- Draught: 4.74 m (15 ft 7 in)
- Installed power: 2,800–3,200 PS (2,100–2,400 kW; 2,800–3,200 bhp) (diesels); 750 PS (550 kW; 740 shp) (electric)
- Propulsion: 2 shafts; 2 × diesel engines; 2 × electric motors
- Speed: 17.7 knots (32.8 km/h; 20.4 mph) surfaced; 7.6 knots (14.1 km/h; 8.7 mph) submerged
- Range: 8,500 nmi (15,700 km; 9,800 mi) at 10 knots (19 km/h; 12 mph) surfaced; 80 nmi (150 km; 92 mi) at 4 knots (7.4 km/h; 4.6 mph) submerged
- Test depth: 230 m (750 ft); Crush depth: 250–295 m (820–968 ft)
- Complement: 4 officers, 40–56 enlisted
- Armament: 5 × 53.3 cm (21 in) torpedo tubes (four bow, one stern); 14 × torpedoes or 26 TMA mines; 1 × 8.8 cm (3.46 in) deck gun (220 rounds); 1 × 2 cm (0.79 in) C/30 anti-aircraft gun

Service record
- Part of: 5th U-boat Flotilla; 14 January – 30 September 1942; 3rd U-boat Flotilla; 1 October 1942 – 24 February 1944
- Identification codes: M 23 394
- Commanders: Oblt.z.S. / Kptlt. Heinz Rahe; 14 January 1942 – 24 February 1944
- Operations: 6 patrols: 1st patrol: 21 September – 18 October 1942; 2nd patrol: 7 – 14 December 1942; 3rd patrol: 22 December 1942 – 12 February 1943; 4th patrol: 14 March – 7 May 1943; 5th patrol: a. 12 June – 14 September 1943; b. 16 – 18 November 1943; 6th patrol: 2 January – 24 February 1944
- Victories: None

German submarine U-257 was a Type VIIC U-boat of Nazi Germany's Kriegsmarine during World War II. She was laid down at the Bremer Vulkan yard at Bremen-Vegesack on 22 February 1941 as yard number 22. She was launched on 19 November and commissioned on 14 January 1942 under the command of Kapitänleutnant Heinz Rahe.

U-257 was assigned to the 5th U-Boat Flotilla for training, then transferred to the 3rd U-boat Flotilla for operational service.

She was sunk by Allied warships in mid-Atlantic on 24 February 1944.

== Design ==
German Type VIIC submarines were preceded by the shorter Type VIIB submarines. U-257 had a displacement of 769 tonnes (757 long tons) when at the surface and 871 tonnes (857 long tons) while submerged. She had a total length of 67.10 m (220 ft 2 in), a pressure hull length of 50.50 m (165 ft 8 in), a beam of 6.20 m (20 ft 4 in), a height of 9.60 m (31 ft 6 in), and a draught of 4.74 m (15 ft 7 in). The submarine was powered by two Germaniawerft F46 four-stroke, six-cylinder supercharged diesel engines producing a total of 2,800 to 3,200 metric horsepower (2,060 to 2,350 kW; 2,760 to 3,160 shp) for use while surfaced, two AEG GU 460/8–27 double-acting electric motors producing a total of 750 metric horsepower (550 kW; 740 shp) for use while submerged. She had two shafts and two 1.23 m (4 ft) propellers. The boat was capable of operating at depths of up to 230 metres (750 ft).

The submarine had a maximum surface speed of 17.7 knots (32.8 km/h; 20.4 mph) and a maximum submerged speed of 7.6 knots (14.1 km/h; 8.7 mph). When submerged, the boat could operate for 80 nautical miles (150 km; 92 mi) at 4 knots (7.4 km/h; 4.6 mph); when surfaced, she could travel 8,500 nautical miles (15,700 km; 9,800 mi) at 10 knots (19 km/h; 12 mph). U-257 was fitted with five 53.3 cm (21 in) torpedo tubes (four fitted at the bow and one at the stern), fourteen torpedoes, one 8.8 cm (3.46 in) SK C/35 naval gun, 220 rounds, and one 2 cm (0.79 in) C/30 anti-aircraft gun. The boat had a complement of between forty-four and sixty.

== Service history ==
The boat carried out six patrols, but did not sink or damage any ships. She was a member of seven wolfpacks.

=== First patrol ===
U-257's first patrol began on 21 September 1942 from Bergen in Norway. Her route took her across the North Sea, through the gap between the Faroe and Shetland Islands and into the Atlantic Ocean. She docked at La Pallice in occupied France, on 18 October.

=== Second, third and fourth patrols ===
These sorties passed without major incident.

=== Fifth patrol ===
The boat was attacked from the air twice in one day. U-257, in the company of U-600 and U-615 was transitting the Bay of Biscay, outbound on 14 June 1943, when a Sunderland flying boat of 228 Squadron RAF unsuccessfully depth charged the three boats. In the afternoon, it was much the same story, but this time a Whitley from No. 10 OTU was involved. One man from the U-boat's crew was wounded. A second Whitley from the same unit arrived, but could only exchange fire with the submarine as it had expended all its depth charges in a previous engagement, the boat escaped.

=== Sixth patrol and loss ===
The submarine had moved to St. Nazaire; she departed from this French Atlantic port on 2 January 1944. On 24 February, she was attacked and sunk in mid-Atlantic by the Canadian frigate HMCS Waskesiu, assisted by HMS Nene. (A former crew member from Waskesiu has stated that Nene merely picked survivors up). Thirty men died in the sinking, there were nineteen survivors.

=== Wolfpacks ===
U-257 took part in seven wolfpacks, namely:

- Luchs (27 September – 6 October 1942)
- Falke (28 December 1942 – 19 January 1943)
- Landsknecht (19 – 28 January 1943)
- Seewolf (25 – 30 March 1943)
- Adler (7 – 13 April 1943)
- Meise (13 – 20 April 1943)
- Specht (21 – 25 April 1943)

== Bibliography ==
- Bishop, Chris (2006). Kriegsmarine U-Boats, 1939-45. London: Amber Books. ISBN 978-1-904687-96-2.
- Busch, Rainer; Röll, Hans-Joachim (1999). German U-boat commanders of World War II : a biographical dictionary. Translated by Brooks, Geoffrey. London, Annapolis, Md: Greenhill Books, Naval Institute Press. ISBN 1-55750-186-6.
- Busch, Rainer; Röll, Hans-Joachim (1999). Der U-Boot-Krieg, 1939-1945: Deutsche U-Boot-Verluste von September 1939 bis Mai 1945 [German U-boat losses from September 1939 to May 1945] (in German). Vol. IV. Hamburg, Berlin, Bonn: Mittler. ISBN 3-8132-0514-2.
- Gröner, Erich; Jung, Dieter; Maass, Martin (1991). U-boats and Mine Warfare Vessels. German Warships 1815–1945. Vol. 2. Translated by Thomas, Keith; Magowan, Rachel. London: Conway Maritime Press. ISBN 0-85177-593-4.
- Kemp, Paul (1999). U-Boats Destroyed - German Submarine Losses in the World Wars. London: Arms & Armour. ISBN 1-85409-515-3.
- Williamson, Gordon (2005). Wolf Pack: The Story of the U-boat in World War II. Osprey. ISBN 1841768723.
