= German submarine U-157 =

U-157 may refer to one of the following German submarines:

- SM U-157, a German Type U 151 submarine launched in 1917
- German submarine U-157 (1941), a German Type IXC submarine that served in World War II
