= MV Prins Harald =

Cargo ship sunk during World War II

History
- Name: Empire Field (1941–42); Prins Harald (1942)
- Namesake: Prince Harald of Norway
- Owner: Ministry of War Transport (1941–42); Norwegian Government (1942)
- Operator: Haldin & Phillips Ltd (Jan–Oct 1942); Nortraship (Oct–Nov 1942)
- Port of registry: Aberdeen, United Kingdom (1941–42); Oslo, Norway (1942)
- Builder: William Doxford & Sons Ltd
- Launched: 23 September 1941
- Completed: January 1942
- Out of service: 20 November 1942
- Identification: United Kingdom Official Number 169008 (1941-42); Code Letters BCVL (1941–42); Code Letters LLPC (1942)
- Fate: Torpedoed and sunk

General characteristics
- Type: Cargo ship
- Tonnage: 7,244 GRT; 5,099 NRT
- Length: 128 feet 8 inches (39.22 m)
- Beam: 56 ft 8 in (17.27 m)
- Draught: 27 ft 4.75 in (8.35 m)
- Depth: 34 ft 9 in (10.59 m)
- Installed power: 516 nhp
- Propulsion: Diesel engine, single screw propeller

Location where Prins Harald was torpedoed and sunk

Prins Harald was a 7,244 GRT cargo ship that was built as Empire Field in 1941 by William Doxford & Sons Ltd, Sunderland for the Ministry of War Transport (MoWT). She was transferred to the Norwegian Government in October 1942 and renamed Prins Harald. She was torpedoed and sunk on 20 November 1942 by U-263 with the loss of three of her crew.

== Description ==
The ship was a cargo ship built in 1941 by William Doxford & Sons Ltd Sunderland, County Durham, United Kingdom.

The ship was 428 feet 8 inches (130.66 m) long, with a beam of 56 feet 3 inches (17.15 m). She had a depth of 35 feet 2 inches (10.72 m) and a draught of 27 feet 4.75 inches (8.35 m). She was assessed at 7,244 GRT, 5.099 NRT,

The ship was propelled by a two-stroke Single Cycle, Single Action diesel engine, which had three cylinders of 23 5/8 inches (60 cm) diameter by 91 5/16 inches (232 cm) stroke driving a screw propeller. The engine was built by William Doxford & Sons Ltd. It was rated at 516 nhp.

== History ==
The ship was built by William Doxford & Sons Ltd Sunderland, County Durham United Kingdom. She was launched on 23 September 1941 and completed in January 1942. Built for the MoWT, she was placed under the management of Haldin & Phillips Ltd. The United Kingdom Official Number 169008 and Code Letters BCVL were allocated. Her port of registry was Sunderland.

Empire Field departed from Sunderland on 28 January 1942, arriving at the Tyne later that day. She departed on 31 January to join Convoy FN 618, which had departed from Southend, Essex the previous day and arrived at Methil, Fife on 1 February. In ballast, she then joined Convoy EN 41, which departed from Methil on 3 February and arrived at Oban, Argyllshire two days later. She left the convoy at Loch Ewe. She then joined Convoy ON 65, which departed from Liverpool, Lancashire on 8 February. Her destination was New York, United States, where she arrived on 25 February. Empire Field departed from New York on 12 March for Cape Town, South Africa, arriving on 10 April. She departed two days later for Karachi, India, arriving on 2 May.

Empire Field departed from Karachi on 6 June for Colombo, Ceylon, arriving on 12 June. She sailed on 24 July for Cape Town, where she arrived on 15 August, departing the same day for Freetown, Sierra Leone. She arrived on 31 August. Carrying tea and general cargo, and 47 bags of mails, Empire Field departed from Freetown on 3 September with Convoy SL 121, which arrived at Liverpool, Lancashire on 21 September. She left the convoy at the Belfast Lough and sailed to Holyhead, Anglesey. She then joined Convoy HM 25, which sailed on 22 September and arrived at Milford Haven, Pembrokeshire the next day. Empire Field then joined Convoy WP 223, which sailed from Milford Haven on 24 September and arrived at Portsmouth, Hampshire on 26 September. She then sailed to Southampton, Hampshire, arriving the next day. She was a member of Convoy PW 230, which departed from Portsmouth on 9 October and arrived at Milford Haven on 12 October. She left the convoy at Portland, Dorset on 9 October, sailing two days later to join Convoy PW 231, which had departed from Portsmouth on 11 October and arrived at Milford Haven on 14 October. She arrived at Cardiff, Glamorgan that day.

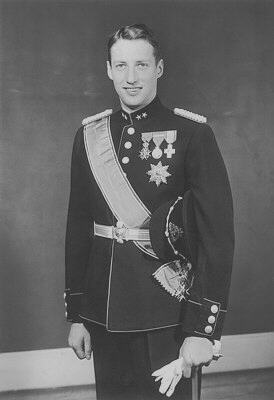
Prins Harald was named after Prince Harald of Norway

On 15 October, Empire Field was transferred to the Norwegian Government and renamed Prins Harald, after Prince Harald of Norway. Her port of registry was Oslo and the Code Letters LLPC were allocated. She was operated under the management of Nortraship. She departed from Cardiff on 17 October for Swansea, Glamorgan, arriving later that day. Carrying war materials for use in Operation Torch, she departed on 3 November for the Clyde, arriving on 5 November. Prins Harald was a member of Convoy KMS 3G, which departed from the Clyde on 8 November and arrived at Bône, Algeria on 25 November. On 20 November, she was torpedoed and in the Atlantic Ocean 240 nautical miles (440 km) west of Gibraltar (35°55′N 10°14′W) by U-263. The ship exploded and sank about half an hour later with the loss of two of her 38 crew and one of her ten DEMS gunners. There were 55 survivors; the ship's dog also survived. Those who died are commemorated on the Plymouth Naval Memorial, United Kingdom and the Minnehallen, Stavern, Norway.
