= HMS Violent =

Destroyer of the Royal Navy

History

United Kingdom
- Name: HMS Violent
- Namesake: violent
- Ordered: July 1916
- Builder: Swan Hunter, Wallsend, Tyne and Wear
- Laid down: 6 December 1916
- Launched: 1 September 1917
- Completed: 20 November 1917
- Identification: Pennant number:D57
- Fate: Transferred for scrapping 8 March 1937
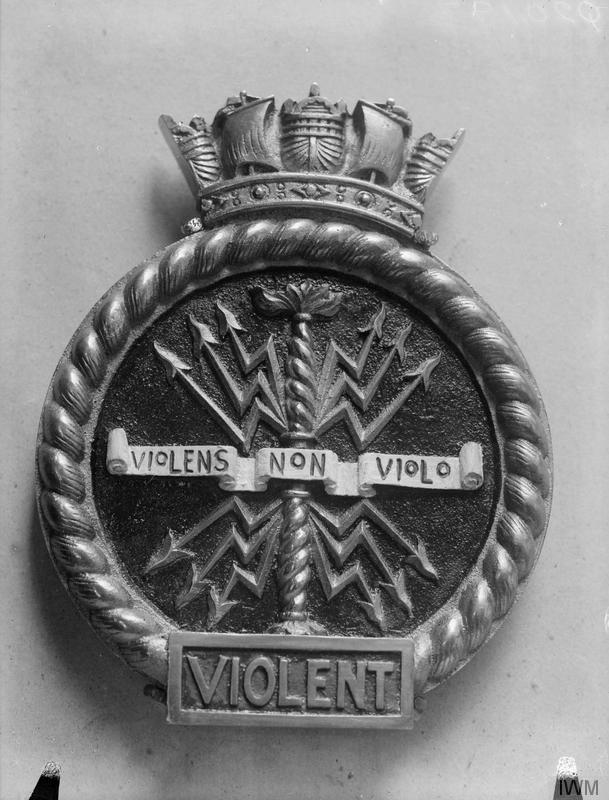
- Badge

General characteristics
- Class & type: Admiralty V-class destroyer
- Displacement: 1,272-1,339 tons
- Length: 300 ft (91.4 m) o/a, 312 ft (95.1 m) p/p
- Beam: 26 ft 9 in (8.2 m)
- Draught: 9 ft (2.7 m) standard, 11 ft 3 in (3.4 m) deep
- Propulsion: 3 Yarrow type Water-tube boilers; Brown-Curtis steam turbines; 2 shafts, 27,000 shp (20,000 kW)
- Speed: 34 knots (63 km/h)
- Range: 320-370 tons oil, 3,500 nmi (6,500 km) at 15 kn (28 km/h), 900 nmi (1,700 km) at 32 kn (59 km/h)
- Complement: 110
- Armament: 4 × QF 4 in Mk.V (102mm L/45), mount P Mk.I; 2 × QF 2 pdr Mk.II "pom-pom" (40 mm L/39) or; 1 z QF 12 pdr 20 cwt Mk.I (76 mm), mount HA Mk.II; 4 (2x2) tubes for 21 in torpedoes

HMS Violent was a V-class destroyer of the British Royal Navy that saw service in World War I and was in commission from 1917 to 1937.

== Construction and commissioning ==
Violent, the first Royal Navy ship of the name, was ordered in July 1916. She was laid down by Swan Hunter at Wallsend, Tyne and Wear, on 6 December 1916 and launched on 1 September 1917. She was completed on 20 November 1917.

== Service history ==
In November 1917, Violent was assigned to the 13th Destroyer Flotilla in the Grand Fleet.

On 19 July 1918, Violent participated in history′s first attack by aircraft launched from the flight deck of an aircraft carrier, when she operated in the North Sea in support of a strike by Royal Air Force Sopwith 2F.1 Camel fighters from the aircraft carrier HMS Furious against the Imperial German Navy Zeppelin dirigible sheds at Tondern, Germany (today Tønder, Denmark) in what became known as the Tondern raid. Returning from the strike, Camel pilot Captain William F. Dickson, who had decided he would not be able to return to Furious, sighted Violent – the first British warship he encountered during his return flight – and circled her before ditching his aircraft in the sea. Violent recovered him, and he went on to become a Marshal of the Royal Air Force, Chief of the Air Staff, and Chief of the Defence Staff.

Violent recommissioned at Chatham Dockyard on 15 October 1920. In 1921, she joined the light cruisers HMS Caledon, Castor, Cordelia, and Curacoa and the destroyers HMS Vanquisher, Vectis, Venetia, Viceroy, Viscount, Winchelsea, and Wolfhound in a Baltic cruise, departing the United Kingdom on 31 August 1921, crossing the North Sea and transiting the Kaiser Wilhelm Canal to enter the Baltic. The ships called at Danzig in the Free City of Danzig; Memel in the Klaipėda Region; Liepāja, Latvia; and Riga, Latvia. The ships sighted a naval mine at the entrance to the harbor as they approached Tallinn, Estonia, on 17 September 1921, and Violent, ordered to sink it, detonated it with gunfire while the other ships waited to proceed. The ships then pulled into Tallinn for a port call and went on to visit Helsinki, Finland; Stockholm, Sweden; Copenhagen, Denmark; Gothenburg, Sweden; and Kristiania, Norway, before crossing the North Sea and ending the voyage at Port Edgar, Scotland, on 15 October 1921.

Violent recommissioned at Rosyth on 11 March 1924. By March 1925 she was operating as part of the 9th Destroyer Flotilla in the Atlantic Fleet. She recommissioned with a reserve crew on 23 November 1925. She recommissioned at the Nore on 10 March 1927. and again on 15 November 1927 for the Maintenance Reserve at Rosyth.

== Final disposition ==
After World War I, the United Kingdom received the passenger liner SS Bismarck from Germany in 1920 as a war reparation, and she was sold to the White Star Line, later the Cunard White Star Line, in which she served as RMS Majestic. In 1936, Cunard White Star retired Majestic and sold her to Thos. W. Ward for scrapping, but because of legal obligations imposed under the agreement transferring Majestic to the United Kingdom as a war prize, the British government instead took control of Majestic and assigned her to the Royal Navy. To pay Thos. W. Ward for Majestic, the Royal Navy agreed to transfer 24 old destroyers with a combined scrap value equivalent to that of Majestic to Thos W Ward for scrapping. Violent was among these, and her transfer to Thos W Ward took place on 8 March 1937. She was scrapped at Inverkeithing, Scotland.

In December 1938, the Royal Navy offered interested parties a chance to apply to purchase Violent′s ship's bell, along with the bells of a number of other ships, encouraging applicants to state any special attachment or claim they had to the bell.

== Bibliography ==
- Colledge, J. J.; Warlow, Ben (2006) [1969]. Ships of the Royal Navy: The Complete Record of All Fighting Ships of the Royal Navy from the 15th Century to the Present (3rd Rev ed.). London: Chatham Publishing. ISBN 978-1-86176-281-8. OCLC 67375475.
- Cocker, Maurice (1981). Destroyers of the Royal Navy, 1893–1981. Ian Allan. ISBN 0-7110-1075-7.
- Friedman, Norman (2009). British Destroyers From Earliest Days to the Second World War. Annapolis, Maryland: Naval Institute Press. ISBN 978-1-59114-081-8.
- Gardiner, Robert & Gray, Randal, eds. (1985). Conway's All the World's Fighting Ships 1906–1921. Annapolis, Maryland: Naval Institute Press. ISBN 0-85177-245-5.
- March, Edgar J. (1966). British Destroyers: A History of Development, 1892–1953; Drawn by Admiralty Permission From Official Records & Returns, Ships' Covers & Building Plans. London: Seeley Service. OCLC 164893555.
- Preston, Antony (1971). 'V & W' Class Destroyers 1917–1945. London: Macdonald. OCLC 464542895.
- Raven, Alan & Roberts, John (1979). 'V' and 'W' Class Destroyers. Man o'War. Vol. 2. London: Arms & Armour. ISBN 0-85368-233-X.
