= HMS Vanquisher =

Destroyer of the Royal Navy

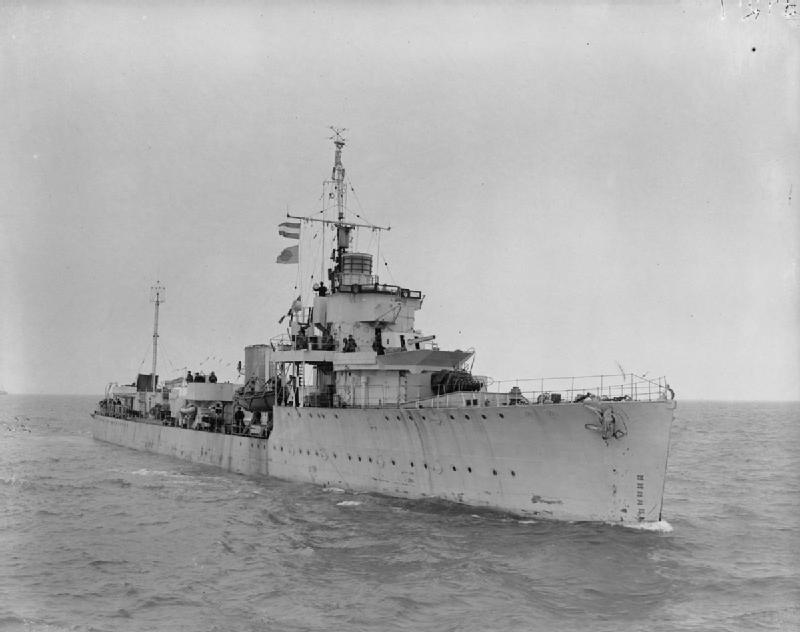
- HMS Vanquisher off Portsmouth, England, during World War II.

History

United Kingdom
- Name: HMS Vanquisher
- Namesake: Vanquisher
- Operator: Royal Navy
- Ordered: 30 June 1916
- Builder: John Brown & Company, Clydebank
- Laid down: 27 September 1916
- Launched: 18 or 28 August 1917
- Commissioned: 2 October 1917
- Decommissioned: June 1945
- Identification: Pennant number: D54
- Motto: Pugna vinco pugno ("I fight, I conquer with my fist")
- Honours and awards: Battle honours for: Atlantic 1939–1945; Dunkirk 1940; English Channel 1943–1944; Normandy 1944
- Fate: For disposal 1947; Sold for scrapping 4 March or 4 May 1947; Scrapping began October 1948
- Badge: A gold dexter arm with clenched fist on a white field

General characteristics
- Class & type: Admiralty V-class destroyer
- Displacement: 1,272–1,339 tons
- Length: 300 ft (91.4 m) o/a, 312 ft (95.1 m) p/p
- Beam: 26 ft 9 in (8.2 m)
- Draught: 9 ft (2.7 m) standard, 11 ft 3 in (3.4 m) deep
- Propulsion: 3 Yarrow type Water-tube boilers; Brown-Curtis steam turbines; 2 shafts, 27,000 shp
- Speed: 34 kt
- Range: 320–370 tons oil, 3,500 nmi at 15 kt, 900 nmi at 32 kt
- Complement: 110
- Armament: 4 × QF 4 in Mk.V (102mm L/45), mount P Mk.I; 2 × QF 2 pdr Mk.II "pom-pom" (40 mm L/39) or; 1 z QF 12 pdr 20 cwt Mk.I (76 mm), mount HA Mk.II; 4 (2x2) tubes for 21 in torpedoes

HMS Vanquisher (D54) was a V-class destroyer of the British Royal Navy that saw service in World War I and World War II.

== Construction and commissioning ==
Vanquisher, the first Royal Navy ship of the name, was ordered on 30 June 1916 as part of the 9th Order of the 1916–17 Naval Programme. She was laid down on 27 September 1916 by John Brown & Company at Clydebank, Scotland, and fitted to carry 60 naval mines by order of the British Admiralty on 12 January 1917. She was launched on 18 or 28 August 1917 (sources vary) and was commissioned on 2 October 1917.

== Service history ==
=== World War I ===
Upon completion, V- and W-class destroyers, including Vanquisher, were assigned to the Grand Fleet or Harwich Force Vanquisher saw service in the last year of World War I.

On 1 August 1918, Vanquisher was operating as part of the 20th Destroyer Flotilla when the flotilla departed the Humber estuary to lay a minefield in the North Sea at the outer end of one of the German-swept channels through the German minefield in the Heligoland Bight. At 23:47 hours the force was within 20 nautical miles (37 km) of the area it was to mine when the destroyer Vehement struck a mine. Its explosion caused Vehement's forward ammunition magazine to detonate, blowing off the entire forward section of the ship forward of the forward funnel, killing one officer and 47 ratings. As the force manoeuvered to clear the minefield, the destroyer Ariel also struck a mine at 00:10 hours on 2 August and, in a repeat of what had happened to Vehement, suffered a magazine detonation that blew off the entire section of the ship forward of the whaleboat's davit. Ariel sank at about 01:00 hours on 2 August, with the loss of four officers and 45 ratings, but Vehement remained afloat, and by about an hour after she struck the mine her crew had put out all of her fires. She was taken in tow by the destroyer Abdiel in the hope of saving her, but at 04:00 hours on 2 August Vehement's stern rose into the air, making further towing impossible. Vehement's surviving crew opened all of her hull valves to speed her sinking and abandoned ship, and Vanquisher and the destroyer Telemachus then sank Vehement with gunfire.

Vanquisher took part in history's first deployment of operational magnetic bottom mines when she joined Abdiel, Telemachus, and the destroyers Tarpon, Vanoc, and Venturous, escorted by eight other destroyers, in laying 234 Sinker Mk1(M) mines in the North Sea off the coast of Flanders, Belgium, about eight nautical miles (15 km) north of Dunkirk, France, on 8 August 1918. German forces did not interfere with the operations. She also participated with Abdiel, Tarpon, Telemachus, and Venturous in the second operation to lay Sinker mines on 22 August 1918, in the North Sea off Flanders about 17 nautical miles (31 km; 20 mi) north of Zeebrugge, Belgium, supported by Royal Air Force aircraft which patrolled to prevent German aerial observation of the operation.

=== Interwar years ===
In 1921, Vanquisher joined the light cruisers Caledon, Castor, Cordelia, and Curacoa and the destroyers Vectis, Venetia, Viceroy, Violent, Viscount, Winchelsea, and Wolfhound in a Baltic cruise, departing the United Kingdom on 31 August 1921. The ships crossed the North Sea, transited the Kaiser Wilhelm Canal to enter the Baltic, and called at Danzig in the Free City of Danzig; Memel in the Klaipėda Region; Liepāja, Latvia; Riga, Latvia; Tallinn, Estonia; Helsinki, Finland; Stockholm, Sweden; Copenhagen, Denmark; Gothenburg, Sweden; and Kristiania, Norway, before crossing the North Sea and ending the voyage at Port Edgar, Scotland, on 15 October 1921.

During the 1920s and 1930s, Vanquisher was assigned to the Atlantic Fleet and Mediterranean Fleet, and in 1938 she was attached to the 1st Antisubmarine Flotilla at Portland, England.

=== World War II ===
==== 1939 ====
After the United Kingdom entered World War II in September 1939, Vanquisher, Winchelsea, the destroyer leader Mackay, and the destroyers Versatile, Vimy, Walker, Warwick, and Whirlwind, were assigned to the 11th Destroyer Flotilla at Plymouth for convoy escort and patrol duties in the Western Approaches. Vanquisher, Walker, and Winchelsea escorted Convoy OB 2 on 9 September 1939, and were returning to Plymouth from this duty when Vanquisher and Walker collided in the North Atlantic Ocean about 200 nautical miles (370 km) southwest of Cape Clear Island, Ireland, on 10 or 11 September 1939 (sources differ). Both ships suffered heavy damage, and Vanquisher had to be towed back to port; Walker, able to proceed under her own power, took casualties from Vanquisher aboard for transportation to the United Kingdom. Walker was under repair until mid-November 1939, but Vanquisher's repairs were not complete until early January 1940.

==== 1940 ====
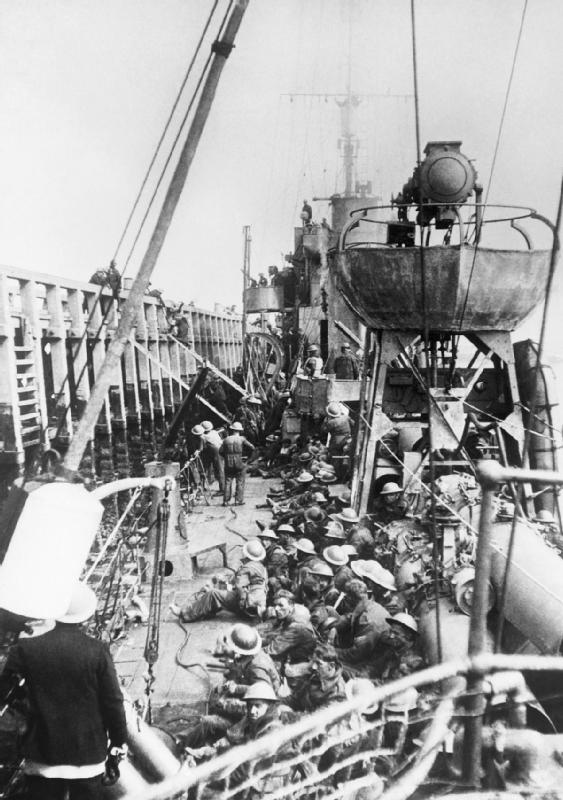
Troops use scaling ladders to board Vanquisher from the mole at Dunkirk

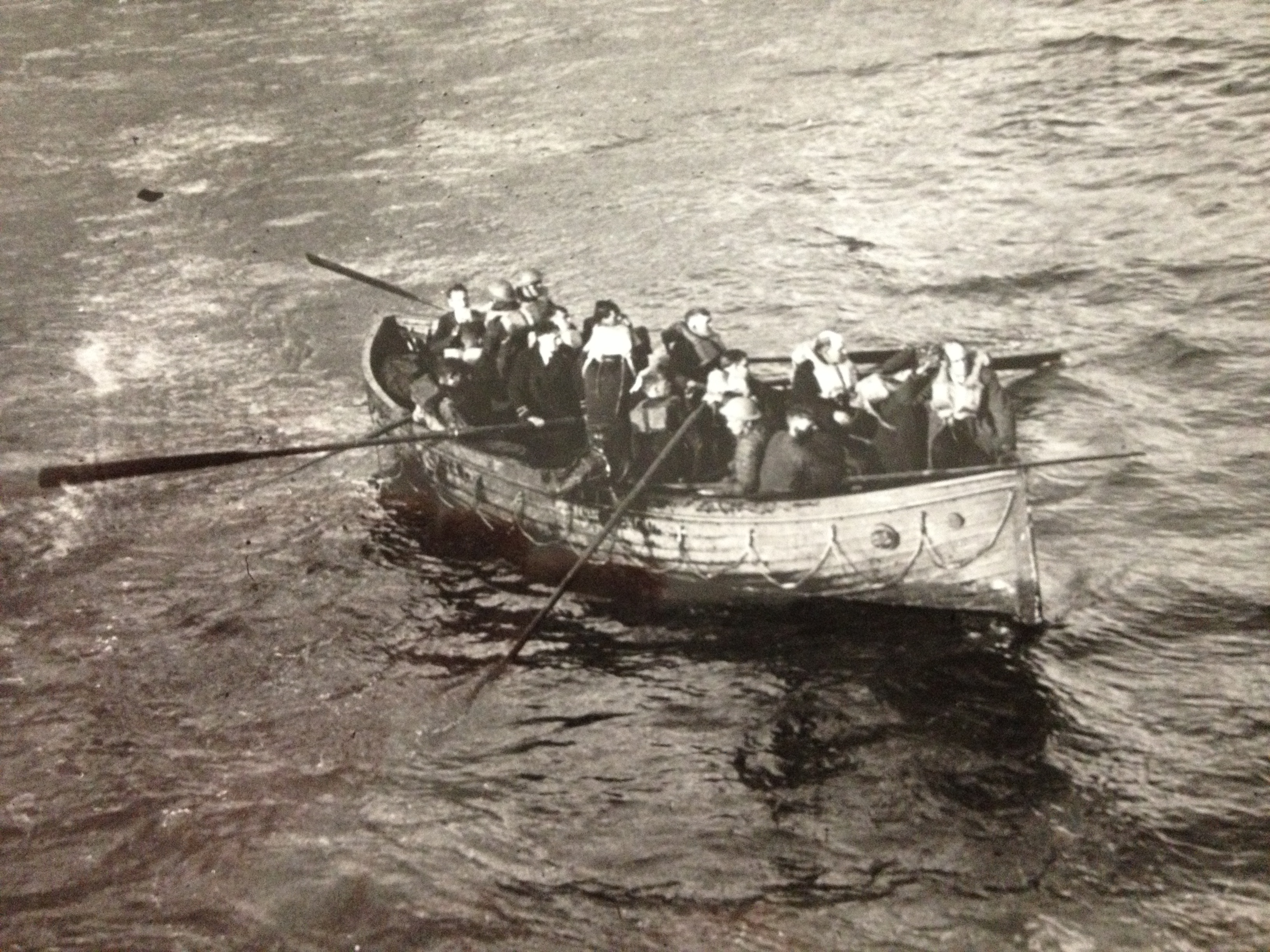
Survivors from Mona's Queen following her sinking at Dunkirk about to be rescued by Vanquisher

In January 1940, Vanquisher underwent post-repair acceptance trials, then returned to convoy defence operations in the Western Approaches with the 11th Destroyer Flotilla, later being reassigned to the English Channel and Southwestern Approaches. In May 1940 she was again reassigned, this time under the Commander-in-Chief, Dover to take part in Operation Dynamo, the evacuation of Allied troops from Dunkirk, France, which she joined on 28 May 1940. She made seven trips between Dunkirk and Dover, England, carrying 241 troops in a voyage on 29 May 582 and 622 troops in two trips on 30 May, 640 and 168 troops in two voyages on 1 June 1940, and 37 and 414 troops in two trips on 3 June 1940. On 12 June 1940 she joined the escort of the French battleship Jean Bart on Jean Bart's voyage from Saint-Nazaire, France, to Casablanca, French Morocco, then on 19 June 1940 steamed to Saint-Nazaire to take part in Operation Aerial, the evacuation of British Expeditionary Force personnel from French ports on the Bay of Biscay. On 20 June 1940, she embarked a demolition party and steamed to La Pallice to destroy port facilities there, but did not land the team. She returned to the United Kingdom at Plymouth on 22 June 1940.

In July 1940, Vanquisher returned to convoy defence duties with the 11th Destroyer Flotilla, and on 8 July 1940 she and the destroyer Scimitar rescued 43 survivors of the British merchant ship Humber Arm, which the German submarine U-99 had torpedoed and sunk in the North Atlantic 60 nautical miles (110 km; 69 mi) south of Fastnet Rock, Ireland, at 50°36′00″N 009°24′00″W. In September 1940, she was reassigned to the 8th Escort Group at Liverpool for convoy escort operations in the North Atlantic, and that month was part of the escort for Convoy OB 216. In November 1940, she and the rest of the 8th Escort Group was assigned to the Gibraltar-United Kingdom convoy route and deployed to the Gibraltar area as an antisubmarine hunting group continuing this duty into 1941.

==== 1941 ====
On 19 May 1941, Vanquisher rescued two survivors of the British merchant ship Empire Ridge, which the German submarine U-96 had torpedoed and sunk in the North Atlantic 90 nautical miles (167 km) west of Bloody Foreland, Ireland, at 55°08′00″N 010°40′00″W. Later in the month, she was transferred to Freetown in Sierra Leone to take part in local convoy escort duties there. From 13 to 19 June 1941 she and the destroyers Velox and Wild Swan escorted Convoy WS 9A during the final segment of its voyage to Freetown, and from 20 to 22 June 1941 the same three destroyers and the destroyer Boreas escorted WS 9A on the first leg of the next stage of its voyage as it steamed from Freetown for the Middle East via the Cape of Good Hope before they detached from the convoy to return to Freetown. From 16 to 18 July 1941, Vanquisher, Boreas, Velox, and the destroyer Brilliant similarly escorted Convoy WS 9B after its departure from Freetown for the Cape of Good Hope before detaching and returning to Freetown.

Vanquisher was transferred to the 10th Escort Group and returned to the United Kingdom in October 1941, and in November 1941 – the month in which she was "adopted" by the civil community of Nuneaton, Warwickshire, in a Warship Week National Savings campaign – she began convoy escort operations in the Northwestern Approaches. From 13 to 16 November 1941, she and the destroyers Badsworth, Exmoor, Volunteer, and Witch joined the escort of Convoy WS 12Z during the first leg of its voyage from the River Clyde in Scotland, then detached and returned to the Clyde. From 14 to 15 December 1941, Vanquisher, Volunteer, and Witch escorted Convoy WS 14 during a portion of its voyage from the Clyde to Freetown, then returned to the Clyde.

==== 1942 ====
On 12 January 1942, Vanquisher, Vanoc, Volunteer, Walker, and the destroyer Witherington departed the Clyde as the local escort for Convoy WS 15, staying with it during its transit of the Western Approaches until relieved by the Royal Australian Navy destroyer HMAS Norman and the Polish Navy destroyer ORP Garland on 17 January 1942, after which she and rest of the local escort detached and returned to the Clyde.

In February 1942, Vanquisher was detached from the 8th Escort Group to operate with the 1st Minelaying Squadron, and on 18 February she escorted the squadron's ships during a minelaying sortie in the Northern Barrage in Operation SN84. She then returned to her escort group to continue convoy defence operations.

In September 1942, Vanquisher entered Portsmouth Dockyard for conversion into a long-range escort. The conversion lasted into 1943.

==== 1943 ====
In April 1943, Vanquisher underwent post-conversion acceptance trials, then conducted workups to prepare for operations in the North Atlantic. In May 1943, she resumed her convoy escort duties as a part of the 6th Escort Group, which also included the destroyer Fame, the frigate Deveron, the corvettes Kingcup, and Vervain, and the Royal Norwegian Navy corvettes Andenes, Rose, Eglantine, and Potentilla. In October 1943, the 6th Escort Group joined the destroyers Duncan and Vidette and the corvettes Pink and Sunflower of the 7th Escort Group in defending Convoy ON 206 during its transatlantic voyage. On 15 October 1943, ON 206 came under sustained attack by German submarines, and on 16 October Vanquisher, Duncan, and Vidette drove off the submarine U-844, which made a determined effort to attack the convoy.

==== 1944 ====
Vanquisher continued her North Atlantic convoy operations into 1944, and escorted Convoy ONS 29 with the rest of the 6th Escort Group during February 1944. In May 1944, she was selected for participation in Operation Neptune, the assault phase of the Allied invasion of Normandy scheduled for early June 1944, and was assigned to Escort Group 106 with the frigate Strule, the corvettes Abelia and Balsam, and motor launches of the Royal Navy Coastal Forces for the operation. In early June, she joined Escort Group 106 at Milford Haven, Wales, and on 4 June the group, supplemented by two more corvettes and the naval trawlers Caldy and Gweal, rendezvoused with an assault convoy, Convoy EMB 3 – consisting of 11 empty motor transport ships – in the Irish Sea. On 5 June, the landings were delayed for 24 hours due to bad weather, but on 6 June, the day of the initial landings, Vanquisher and the other ships of her convoy moved to ports on the south coast of England, where the motor transport ships were loaded. On 7 June, the convoy made its passage to the beachhead, and on 8 June it arrived off the invasion beaches and discharged its cargo. On 10 June, Vanquisher began escorting convoys carrying reinforcements and supplies from Falmouth to the beachhead, continuing in this role until Operation Neptune concluded toward the end of June. She then returned to the 6th Escort Group and escorted North Atlantic convoys for the rest of 1944 and into 1945.

==== 1945 ====
In April 1945, Vanquisher was part of the escort for Convoy ONA 265. On 10 April, she and the corvette Tintagel Castle cooperated in a depth-charge attack that sank the German submarine U-878 with all hands in the Bay of Biscay west of Saint-Nazaire, France, at 47°35′00″N 010°33′00″W.

After the surrender of Germany in early May 1945, the Royal Navy withdrew Vanquisher from service.

== Decommissioning and disposal ==
Vanquisher was decommissioned in June 1945 and placed in reserve. Placed on the disposal list in 1947, she was sold on 4 March or 4 May 1947 (sources differ) to BISCO for scrapping by Metal Industries. She arrived under tow at the shipbreaker's yard at Charlestown, Fife, Scotland, in October 1948.

== Bibliography ==
- Campbell, John (1985). Naval Weapons of World War II. Annapolis, Maryland: Naval Institute Press. ISBN 0-87021-459-4.
- Chesneau, Roger, ed. (1980). Conway's All the World's Fighting Ships 1922–1946. Greenwich, UK: Conway Maritime Press. ISBN 0-85177-146-7.
- Colledge, J. J.; Warlow, Ben (2006) [1969]. Ships of the Royal Navy: The Complete Record of All Fighting Ships of the Royal Navy from the 15th Century to the Present (3rd Rev ed.). London: Chatham Publishing. ISBN 978-1-86176-281-8. OCLC 67375475.
- Cocker, Maurice (17 August 1981). Destroyers of the Royal Navy, 1893–1981. Ian Allan. ISBN 0-7110-1075-7.
- Friedman, Norman (2009). British Destroyers From Earliest Days to the Second World War. Annapolis, Maryland: Naval Institute Press. ISBN 978-1-59114-081-8.
- Gardiner, Robert & Gray, Randal, eds. (1985). Conway's All the World's Fighting Ships 1906–1921. Annapolis, Maryland: Naval Institute Press. ISBN 0-85177-245-5.
- Lenton, H. T. (1998). British & Empire Warships of the Second World War. Annapolis, Maryland: Naval Institute Press. ISBN 1-55750-048-7.
- March, Edgar J. (1966). British Destroyers: A History of Development, 1892–1953; Drawn by Admiralty Permission From Official Records & Returns, Ships' Covers & Building Plans. London: Seeley Service. OCLC 164893555.
- Preston, Antony (1971). 'V & W' Class Destroyers 1917–1945. London: Macdonald. OCLC 464542895.
- Raven, Alan & Roberts, John (1979). 'V' and 'W' Class Destroyers. Man o'War. Vol. 2. London: Arms & Armour. ISBN 0-85368-233-X.
- Rohwer, Jürgen (2005). Chronology of the War at Sea 1939–1945: The Naval History of World War Two (Third Revised ed.). Annapolis, Maryland: Naval Institute Press. ISBN 1-59114-119-2.
- Whinney, Bob (2000). The U-boat Peril: A Fight for Survival. Cassell. ISBN 0-304-35132-6.
- Whitley, M. J. (1988). Destroyers of World War 2. Annapolis, Maryland: Naval Institute Press. ISBN 0-87021-326-1.
- Winser, John de D. (1999). B.E.F. Ships Before, At and After Dunkirk. Gravesend, Kent: World Ship Society. ISBN 0-905617-91-6.
