= HMS Viceroy =

Destroyer of the Royal Navy

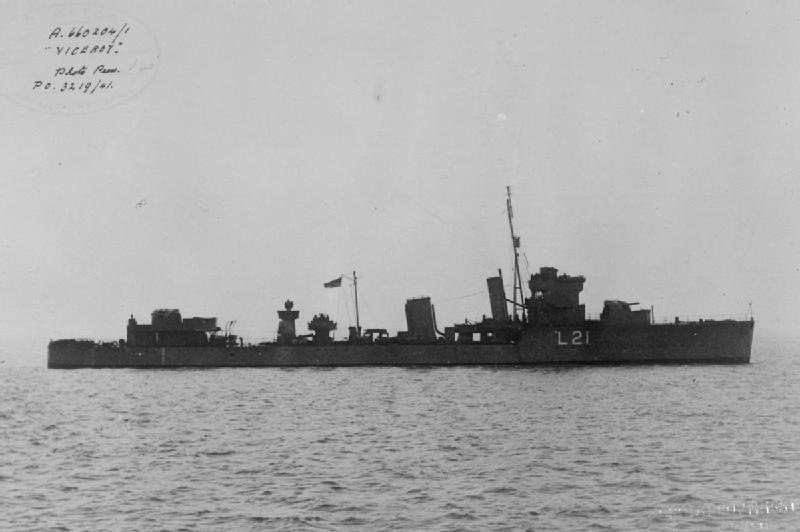
- HMS Viceroy during World War II.

History

United Kingdom
- Name: HMS Viceroy
- Namesake: viceroy
- Ordered: 30 June 1916 or August 1916
- Builder: John I. Thornycroft & Company, Woolston
- Laid down: 12 December 1916
- Launched: 17 November 1917
- Completed: 14 January 1918
- Commissioned: 18 January 1918
- Decommissioned: mid-1930s
- Identification: Pennant number: F99 (January 1918); F38 (April 1918); D91 (interwar); L21 (May 1940)
- Recommissioned: January 1941
- Decommissioned: sometime after 15 August 1945
- Motto: In the King's name
- Honours and awards: Battle honours for: North Sea 1942–1945; Sicily 1943
- Fate: Sold 15 May 1947 or June 1948 for scrapping
- Badge: The Star of India under a crown proper on a white field

General characteristics
- Displacement: 1,120 tons standard
- Length: 300 ft (91 m) o/a, 312 ft (95 m) p/p
- Beam: 30 ft 6 in (9.30 m)
- Draught: 10 ft 6 in (3.20 m)
- Propulsion: 3 Yarrow type Water-tube boilers, Brown-Curtis steam turbines, 2 shafts, 30,000 shp
- Speed: 36-knot (67 km/h)
- Range: 320–370 tons oil, 3,500 nmi (6,500 km) at 15 knots (28 km/h), 900 nmi (1,700 km) at 32 knots (59 km/h)
- Complement: 134
- Armament: 4 × QF 4 in Mk V (102mm L/45), mount P Mk.I; 1 × QF 3-inch 20 cwt Mk.I (76 mm), mount HA Mk.II; 6 (3x2) tubes for 21 in torpedoes

HMS Viceroy (D91) was a W-class destroyer of the British Royal Navy that saw service in the final months of World War I and in World War II.

== Construction and commissioning ==
Viceroy, the first Royal Navy ship of the name, was ordered either on 30 June 1916 or in August 1916 (sources differ) as part of the 9th Order of the 1916–1917 Naval Programme and was laid down by John I. Thornycroft & Company at Woolston, Hampshire, England, on 12 December 1916. Launched on 17 November 1917, she was completed on 14 January 1918 and commissioned on 18 January 1918. She was assigned the pennant number F99 in January 1918; it was changed to F38 in April 1918 and to D91 during the interwar period.

== Service history ==
=== World War I ===
Upon completion, Viceroy was assigned to the Grand Fleet, based at Scapa Flow in the Orkney Islands, in which she served for the rest of World War I.

=== Interwar ===
After the conclusion of World War I, Viceroy served in the 2nd Destroyer Flotilla in the Atlantic Fleet.

In 1921, Viceroy joined the light cruisers Caledon, Castor, Cordelia, and Curacoa and the destroyers Vanquisher, Vectis, Venetia, Violent, Viscount, Winchelsea, and Wolfhound in a Baltic cruise, departing the United Kingdom on 31 August 1921. The ships crossed the North Sea and transited the Kaiser Wilhelm Canal to enter the Baltic, where they called at Danzig in the Free City of Danzig; Memel in the Klaipėda Region; Liepāja, Latvia; Riga, Latvia; Tallinn, Estonia; Helsinki, Finland; Stockholm, Sweden; Copenhagen, Denmark; Gothenburg, Sweden; and Kristiania, Norway, before crossing the North Sea and ending the voyage at Port Edgar, Scotland, on 15 October 1921.

Viceroy later served in the 2nd Destroyer Flotilla in the Mediterranean Fleet before being decommissioned, transferred to the Reserve Fleet, and placed in reserve in the mid-1930s.

In 1939, the Royal Navy selected Viceroy for conversion into an antiaircraft escort.

=== World War II ===
Viceroy's conversion had not yet begun when the United Kingdom entered World War II on 3 September 1939, and she remained out of commission in reserve. Conversion work and a refit finally began in April 1940. While in dockyard hands, her pennant number was changed to L21 in May 1940.

After her conversion and refit were completed on 10 January 1941, Viceroy was recommissioned and began post-conversion acceptance trials in January 1941. Before the end of the month, she had completed them and the Royal Navy assigned her to convoy escort and patrol duty in the North Sea. In March 1942 the civil community of Meriden, then in Warwickshire, "adopted" Viceroy as the result of a Warship Week national savings campaign.

Viceroy continued on her North Sea duties until reassigned in May 1943 to the support of the upcoming Allied invasion of Sicily, Operation Husky, scheduled for July 1943. She departed the United Kingdom for the Mediterranean Sea in June 1943, and in early July 1943 joined Escort Force S at Algiers in Algeria. Escort Force S departed Algiers on 5 July 1943 escorting the military convoy KMS 18 bound for Sicily, but Viceroy had to detach from the convoy on 9 July 1943 for a quick repair at Malta. It was completed in time for her to depart Malta on 10 July and arrive off the Sicily invasion beaches on 11 July 1943, the day after the initial landings, where she joined Escort Group V to defend the anchorage off the beachhead, conduct patrols, and escort convoys. She continued to support Operation Husky until September 1943, when she returned to the United Kingdom to resume patrol and convoy escort operations in the North Sea. From December 1943 she was commanded by Lieutenant Commander John Manners and carried out her escort duties into 1945, taking no part in operations related to the Allied invasion of Normandy in the summer of 1944.

On 16 April 1945, Viceroy was escorting Convoy FS 1874 off Sunderland when the German submarine U-1274 attacked, torpedoing and sinking the tanker Athelduke. Viceroy counterattacked, leaving U-1274 lying stationary on the bottom of the North Sea north of Newcastle upon Tyne at 55°36′00″N 001°24′00″W. It was not clear that U-1274 had been sunk, so Viceroy returned to the scene on 24 April, found U-1274 in the same location on the seabed, and dropped depth charges on the submarine, bringing wreckage to the surface and confirming that she had sunk U-1274 with no survivors on 16 April. Viceroy's crew recovered brandy which had been aboard U-1274 from the water and built a presentation case for it; the First Sea Lord, Admiral of the Fleet Andrew Cunningham, sent it to Prime Minister Winston Churchill, who, in a note of 12 May 1945, expressed thanks to Cunningham and Viceroy's crew for the "interesting souvenir" and congratulations on the sinking.

Viceroy continued her patrol and escort operations in the North Sea until the surrender of Germany in early May 1945. She then supported Allied forces reoccupying Norway, entering port at Trondheim on 16 May 1945 after minesweepers of the 9th Minesweeping Flotilla had cleared the harbour and its approaches of naval mines. She spent the summer of 1945 on operations in the North Sea.

== Decommissioning and disposal ==
After the surrender of Japan on 15 August 1945, Viceroy was decommissioned and placed in reserve, being no longer carried on the Royal Navy's active list by October 1945. She was placed on the disposal list in 1947 and sold on 17 May 1947 or in June 1948 (sources differ) to G. W. Brunton of Grangemouth, Scotland, for scrapping. She arrived at the shipbreaker's yard at Brechin, Grangemouth, on 10 September 1948.

== Bibliography ==
- Campbell, John (1985). Naval Weapons of World War II. Annapolis, Maryland: Naval Institute Press. ISBN 0-87021-459-4.
- Chesneau, Roger, ed. (1980). Conway's All the World's Fighting Ships 1922–1946. Greenwich, UK: Conway Maritime Press. ISBN 0-85177-146-7.
- Colledge, J. J.; Warlow, Ben (2006) [1969]. Ships of the Royal Navy: The Complete Record of All Fighting Ships of the Royal Navy from the 15th Century to the Present (3rd Rev ed.). London: Chatham Publishing. ISBN 978-1-86176-281-8. OCLC 67375475.
- Cocker, Maurice. Destroyers of the Royal Navy, 1893–1981. Ian Allan. ISBN 0-7110-1075-7.
- Friedman, Norman (2009). British Destroyers From Earliest Days to the Second World War. Annapolis, Maryland: Naval Institute Press. ISBN 978-1-59114-081-8.
- Gardiner, Robert & Gray, Randal, eds. (1985). Conway's All the World's Fighting Ships 1906–1921. Annapolis, Maryland: Naval Institute Press. ISBN 0-85177-245-5.
- Lenton, H. T. (1998). British & Empire Warships of the Second World War. Annapolis, Maryland: Naval Institute Press. ISBN 1-55750-048-7.
- March, Edgar J. (1966). British Destroyers: A History of Development, 1892–1953; Drawn by Admiralty Permission From Official Records & Returns, Ships' Covers & Building Plans. London: Seeley Service. OCLC 164893555.
- Preston, Antony (1971). 'V & W' Class Destroyers 1917–1945. London: Macdonald. OCLC 464542895.
- Raven, Alan & Roberts, John (1979). 'V' and 'W' Class Destroyers. Man o'War. Vol. 2. London: Arms & Armour. ISBN 0-85368-233-X.
- Rohwer, Jürgen (2005). Chronology of the War at Sea 1939–1945: The Naval History of World War Two (Third Revised ed.). Annapolis, Maryland: Naval Institute Press. ISBN 1-59114-119-2.
- Whinney, Bob (2000). The U-boat Peril: A Fight for Survival. Cassell. ISBN 0-304-35132-6.
- Whitley, M. J. (1988). Destroyers of World War 2. Annapolis, Maryland: Naval Institute Press. ISBN 0-87021-326-1.
- Winser, John de D. (1999). B.E.F. Ships Before, At and After Dunkirk. Gravesend, Kent: World Ship Society. ISBN 0-905617-91-6.
