= HMS Viscount =

Destroyer of the Royal Navy

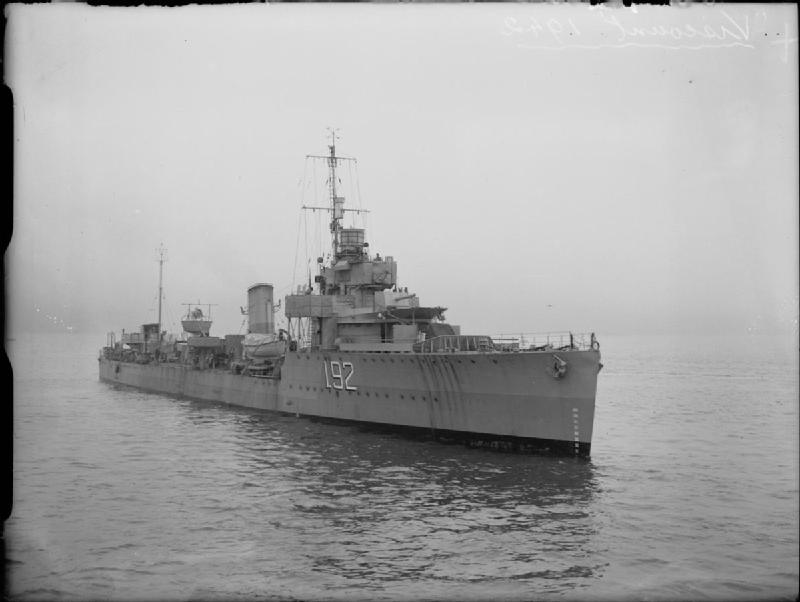
- HMS Viscount sometime after the May 1940 change of her pennant number to I92.

History

United Kingdom
- Name: HMS Viscount
- Namesake: viscount
- Ordered: 30 June 1916 or July 1916
- Builder: John I. Thornycroft & Company, Woolston, Hampshire
- Laid down: 20 December 1916
- Launched: 29 December 1917
- Completed: 4 March 1918
- Commissioned: 4 March 1918
- Decommissioned: March 1945
- Identification: Pennant number: F99; G06; G24 (April 1918); D92 (interwar); I92 (May 1940)
- Motto: Nobile qui nobilis ("Handsome is as handsome does")
- Honours and awards: Battle honours for: Atlantic 1939–1944; Biscay 1943
- Fate: Sold 20 March 1945 for scrapping
- Badge: A viscount's coronet proper on a white field

General characteristics
- Class & type: V-class destroyer
- Displacement: 1,120 tons standard
- Length: 300 ft (91 m) o/a, 312 ft (95 m) p/p
- Beam: 30 ft 6 in (9.30 m)
- Draught: 10 ft 6 in (3.20 m)
- Propulsion: 3 Yarrow type Water-tube boilers, Brown-Curtis steam turbines, 2 shafts, 30,000 shp
- Speed: 36-knot (67 km/h)
- Range: 320–370 tons oil, 3,500 nmi (6,500 km) at 15 knots (28 km/h), 900 nmi (1,700 km) at 32 knots (59 km/h)
- Complement: 134
- Armament: 4 × QF 4 in Mk V (102mm L/45), mount P Mk.I; 1 × QF 3-inch 20 cwt Mk.I (76 mm), mount HA Mk.II; 6 (3x2) tubes for 21 in torpedoes

HMS Viscount was a V-class destroyer (Thornycroft V and W class) of the British Royal Navy that saw service in the final months of World War I and in World War II.

== Construction and commissioning ==
Viscount, the first Royal Navy ship of the name, was ordered either on 30 June 1916 or in July 1916 (sources differ) as part of the 9th Order of the 1916–1917 Naval Programme and was laid down by John I. Thornycroft & Company at Woolston, Hampshire, England, on 20 December 1916. Although broadly similar, Viscount was one of only two V-Class destroyers built by Thornycrofts. HMS Viscount differed in a number of ways to other V-Class destroyers and was notably faster. Launched on 29 December 1917, she was completed on 4 March 1918 and commissioned the same day. Her original pennant number, F99, was changed first to G06 and then in April 1918 to G24; it was changed to D92 during the interwar period.

== Service history ==
=== First World War ===
Upon completion, Viscount was assigned to the Grand Fleet, based at Scapa Flow in the Orkney Islands, in which she served for the rest of World War I. Viscount rapidly gained a reputation as an exceptionally fast ship and successfully attacked and sank at least one German U-boat which was caught on the surface. HMS Viscount was signalled to attack at full speed. The U-boat spoilt the aim of Viscount's forward battery by submerging full-speed astern. Viscount steamed over the U-boat and destroyed it by depth charges. HMS Viscount also participated in several cruises/escorts to Murmansk and Archangel during this period. Other actions included the interception and seizing of Bolshevik-controlled Russian warships in support of White Russian forces.

=== Interwar ===
After the conclusion of World War I, Viscount served in the Atlantic Fleet. In 1921 she joined the light cruisers Caledon, Castor, Cordelia, and Curacoa and the destroyers Vanquisher, Vectis, Venetia, Viceroy, Violent, Winchelsea, and Wolfhound in a Baltic Sea cruise, departing the United Kingdom on 31 August 1921. The ships crossed the North Sea and transited the Kaiser Wilhelm Canal to enter the Baltic, where they called at Danzig in the Free City of Danzig; Memel in the Klaipėda Region; Liepāja, Latvia; Riga, Latvia; Tallinn, Estonia; Helsinki, Finland; Stockholm, Sweden; Copenhagen, Denmark; Gothenburg, Sweden; and Kristiania, Norway, before crossing the North Sea and ending the voyage at Port Edgar, Scotland, on 15 October 1921.

Viscount later served in the Mediterranean Fleet before being assigned to duties in home waters. She was attached to the 1st Submarine Flotilla in 1938.

=== Second World War ===
==== 1939–1940 ====
When the United Kingdom entered World War II on 3 September 1939, Viscount was deployed with the 19th Destroyer Flotilla, based at Plymouth, for convoy escort and patrol duty in the English Channel and Southwestern Approaches. In January 1940, she was reassigned to the Western Approaches Command but continued her escort and patrol operations from Plymouth. On 7 January 1940, she and the destroyer Vanoc relieved two French warships as escort for Convoy HG 13 during the final leg of its voyage from Gibraltar to the United Kingdom; the destroyers Venetia and Volunteer and the trawler Arctic Ranger joined the escort on 8 January 1940, and Viscount detached from it on 10 January. On 18 February 1940, Viscount and Vanquisher relieved a French warship as the escort for Convoy HG 18 during the final portion of its voyage from Gibraltar to Liverpool, detaching to return to Plymouth when it arrived at Liverpool on 19 February 1940. On 8 April 1940, Viscount, the destroyers Vimy and Witch, and the Shoreham-class sloop Rochester relieved a French warship as the escort of Convoy HG 25F for the last leg of its voyage from Gibraltar to Liverpool; although Vimy and Witch detached the next day, Viscount and Rochester stayed with the convoy until arrived at Liverpool on 11 April 1940. In April, Western Approaches Command moved its headquarters to Liverpool, and as a result Viscount's base was changed from Plymouth to Liverpool.

In May 1940, Viscount's pennant number was changed to I92. That month, she was assigned to operations related to the Norwegian Campaign in the aftermath of the April 1940 German invasion of Norway and Denmark. On 17 May 1940, she joined the destroyers Diana and Veteran in escorting the aircraft carrier HMS Glorious from the River Clyde in Scotland to the Norwegian coast. On 7 June 1940, Viscount, the destroyers Antelope, Witherington and Wolverine, and the escort destroyer Atherstone departed the United Kingdom to meet a convoy of troopships that had been delayed by fog. Later that day, the destroyers rendezvoused with the troopships – carrying Allied personnel evacuated from Norway as the campaign there ended in the German conquest of the country – and the repair ship Vindictive and took them under escort to the Clyde. The convoy came under attack by German aircraft on 8 June 1940, but the escorts drove the German planes off.

Viscount returned to her North Atlantic convoy escort duty in July 1940. In September 1940 she detached from it to join Witherington and the destroyers Vansittart and Whitehall in escorting the auxiliary minelayers Menestheus, Port Napier, Port Quebec, and Southern Prince while they laid mines in the Northern Barrage in Operation SN42.

Viscount then went back to convoy operations, and she was part of the escort of Convoy HG 47 – bound from Gibraltar to the United Kingdom – along with the Hastings-class sloop Folkestone and Flower-class corvette Gentian in November 1940. Detaching from HG 47, she rendezvoused with Convoy HX 90 – 41 ships bound from Halifax, Nova Scotia, Canada, to Liverpool – as its escort on 1 December 1940. Later that day, HX 90 came under attack by the first of six German submarines, which sank 10 of its ships on 1 and 2 December. The sinkings stopped only after Viscount and the Royal Canadian Navy destroyer St. Laurent conducted 13 depth-charge attacks on asdic contacts over the course of four hours on 2 December, keeping the submarines submerged and unable to attack until HX 90 had left the area. On 2 December, Viscount rescued survivors from some of HX 90's lost ships, picking up some of the 21 survivors from the armed merchant cruiser Forfar, which the German submarine U-99 had torpedoed and sunk 500 nautical miles (930 km) west of Ireland at 54°35′00″N 018°18′00″W with the loss of 172 lives; 16 survivors of the British merchant ship Kavak, which the German submarine U-100 had torpedoed and sunk during the night of 1–2 December about 340 nautical miles (630 km) west of Bloody Foreland at 55°00′00″N 019°30′00″W; 36 survivors of the British merchant ship Goodleigh, which the German submarine U-52 had torpedoed and sunk on 2 December 367 nautical miles (680 km) west of Bloody Foreland at 55°02′00″N 018°45′00″W; and 27 survivors of the Ellerman Lines cargo ship Tasso, which U-52 had torpedoed and sunk on 2 December about 360 nautical miles (670 km) west of Bloody Foreland at 55°03′00″N 018°04′00″W. Viscount then escorted HX 90 the rest of the way to Liverpool, where it arrived on 5 December 1940.

==== 1941–1942 ====
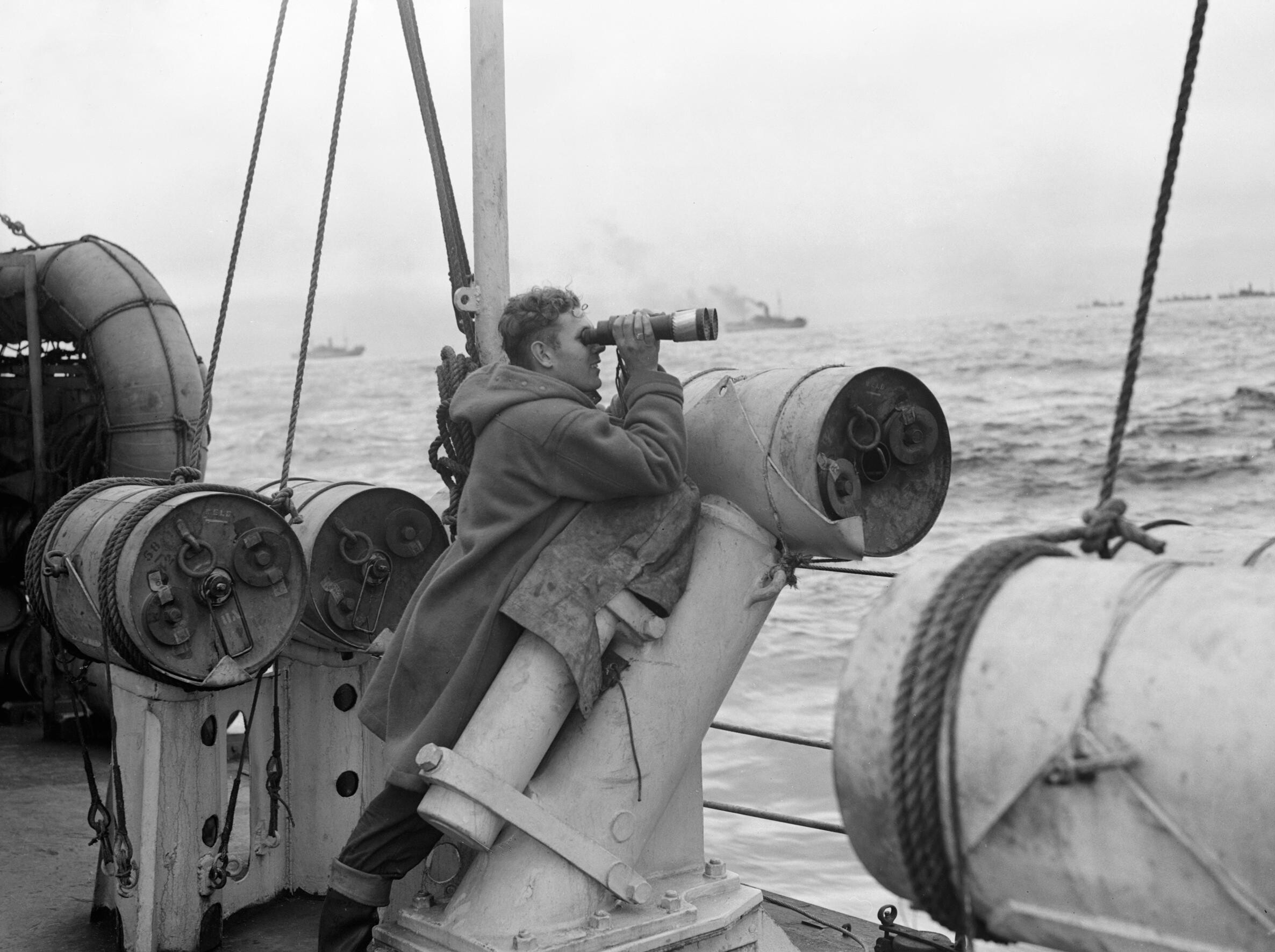
Leaning against a depth charge thrower, the quarterdeck lookout on board HMS Viscount searches the sea for submarines, 1942 (IWM A13362)

Viscount continued on convoy escort duty in the North Atlantic until June 1941, when she began conversion to a Long-Range Escort at Liverpool. With the conversion complete, she underwent post-conversion acceptance trials and, having passed them, performed work-ups in December 1941 to prepare for her return to convoy duty, which she did later that month.

In March 1942, Viscount was "adopted" by the civilian community of Chislehurst and Sidcup in Kent in a Warship Week national savings campaign. In April 1942, she was reassigned to the 6th Escort Group, joining the corvettes Rose and Potentilla and the Royal Norwegian Navy corvettes HNoMS Andenes and HNoMS Eglantine. In May 1942, she escorted Convoy SC 83 with the group. By June–July 1942, she had had Type 271 surface warning radar and a Hedgehog antisubmarine mortar installed.

On 13 August 1942, Viscount was part of the escort of Convoy ONS 122 when it came under a series of sustained attacks by German submarines of the "Lohs" group. On 23 August, she intercepted communications from one of the submarines, got a fix on its location, detected it with asdic after it submerged, and attacked it. By the time attacks on ONS 122 ended, it had lost four ships and its escorts had damaged two German submarines.

In October 1942, Viscount was part of the escort of Convoy SC 1 CW, which came under attack by 10 German submarines of the "Wotan" (Wōden) group. On 15 October, while defending the convoy, Viscount detected the submarine U-607 on radar and attacked her unsuccessfully. Viscount then rammed and thereafter sank the submarine by gun fire and a heavy depth charge. U-661 at 53°42′00″N 035°56′00″W, which went down with the loss of her entire crew of 44. Viscount suffered significant damage in the ramming and had to detach from the convoy and proceed to the United Kingdom for repairs.

==== 1943–1945 ====
Viscount's repairs were completed in February 1943, and she rejoined the 6th Escort Group that month in time to join the escort of Convoy ONS 165, which came under attack from German submarines of the "Taifun" ("Typhoon") group. In defence of the convoy, she depth charged and rammed the submarine U-201 in the North Atlantic at 50°50′00″N 040°50′00″W. U-201 sank with the loss of her entire crew of 49, and Viscount again suffered significant damage, requiring repairs that lasted through April 1943.

In May 1943, Viscount returned to North Atlantic convoy duty. While escorting Convoy ONS 6 with the 6th Escort Group on 8 May 1943, she got a radio direction-finding fix on a German submarine and closed with it, sighting it at a range of 7,000 yards (6,400 m). The submarine submerged, and Viscount attacked it with depth charges, but without success.

Over the course of the summer of 1943, Viscount was detached for Operation Derange, consisting of offensive antisubmarine operations in the Bay of Biscay in which aircraft and ships cooperated in attacks on German submarines transiting the bay between their bases in German-occupied France and the Atlantic shipping routes. In September 1943, she took part in Operation Alacrity, joining the escort aircraft carrier HMS Fencer, the destroyers HMS Inconstant, HMS Whitehall, and HMS Wrestler, and the Polish Navy destroyers ORP Garland and ORP Burza in forming the 8th Support Group to escort military convoys to the Azores as the Allies set up air bases there. She continued operations in support of Alacrity into October 1943.

Viscount returned to Atlantic convoy duty in October 1943, continuing it without further major incident into the early weeks of 1945, when she also began convoy escort operations in British coastal waters. In order to free up her crew members to man newer, more modern escort ships, she was withdrawn from operations in February 1945 and decommissioned in March 1945.

== Decommissioning and disposal ==
Viscount was sold on 20 March 1945 to BISCO for scrapping by Clayton and Davie at Dunston. She arrived at the shipbreaker's yard on 27 May 1947.

== Bibliography ==
- Campbell, John (1985). Naval Weapons of World War II. Annapolis, Maryland: Naval Institute Press. ISBN 0-87021-459-4.
- Chesneau, Roger, ed. (1980). Conway's All the World's Fighting Ships 1922–1946. Greenwich, UK: Conway Maritime Press. ISBN 0-85177-146-7.
- Colledge, J. J.; Warlow, Ben (2006) [1969]. Ships of the Royal Navy: The Complete Record of All Fighting Ships of the Royal Navy from the 15th Century to the Present (3rd Rev ed.). London: Chatham Publishing. ISBN 978-1-86176-281-8. OCLC 67375475.
- Cocker, Maurice. Destroyers of the Royal Navy, 1893–1981. Ian Allan. ISBN 0-7110-1075-7.
- Friedman, Norman (2009). British Destroyers From Earliest Days to the Second World War. Annapolis, Maryland: Naval Institute Press. ISBN 978-1-59114-081-8.
- Gardiner, Robert & Gray, Randal, eds. (1985). Conway's All the World's Fighting Ships 1906–1921. Annapolis, Maryland: Naval Institute Press. ISBN 0-85177-245-5.
- Lenton, H. T. (1998). British & Empire Warships of the Second World War. Annapolis, Maryland: Naval Institute Press. ISBN 1-55750-048-7.
- March, Edgar J. (1966). British Destroyers: A History of Development, 1892–1953; Drawn by Admiralty Permission From Official Records & Returns, Ships' Covers & Building Plans. London: Seeley Service. OCLC 164893555.
- Preston, Antony (1971). 'V & W' Class Destroyers 1917–1945. London: Macdonald. OCLC 464542895.
- Raven, Alan & Roberts, John (1979). 'V' and 'W' Class Destroyers. Man o'War. Vol. 2. London: Arms & Armour. ISBN 0-85368-233-X.
- Rohwer, Jürgen (2005). Chronology of the War at Sea 1939–1945: The Naval History of World War Two (Third Revised ed.). Annapolis, Maryland: Naval Institute Press. ISBN 1-59114-119-2.
- Whinney, Bob (2000). The U-boat Peril: A Fight for Survival. Cassell. ISBN 0-304-35132-6.
- Whitley, M. J. (1988). Destroyers of World War 2. Annapolis, Maryland: Naval Institute Press. ISBN 0-87021-326-1.
- Winser, John de D. (1999). B.E.F. Ships Before, At and After Dunkirk. Gravesend, Kent: World Ship Society. ISBN 0-905617-91-6.
