= HMS Venetia =

Destroyer of the Royal Navy

History

United Kingdom
- Name: HMS Venetia
- Ordered: 30 June 1916
- Builder: Fairfield Shipbuilding and Engineering Company, Govan
- Laid down: 2 February 1917
- Launched: 29 October 1917
- Completed: 19 December 1917
- Commissioned: 19 December 1917
- Decommissioned: 1920s/1930s?
- Identification: Pennant number: F9A (1917); F93 (January 1918); F14 (April 1918); D53 (interwar)
- Recommissioned: September 1939
- Motto: Volo non fugia ("I fly but do not flee")
- Honours and awards: Battle honour for Atlantic 1939-1940
- Fate: Sunk 19 October 1940
- Badge: A gold winged lion's mask on a blue field

General characteristics
- Class & type: Admiralty V-class destroyer
- Displacement: 1,272-1,339 tons
- Length: 300 ft (91.4 m) o/a, 312 ft (95.1 m) p/p
- Beam: 26 ft 9 in (8.2 m)
- Draught: 9 ft (2.7 m) standard, 11 ft 3 in (3.4 m) deep
- Propulsion: 3 Yarrow type Water-tube boilers; Brown-Curtis steam turbines; 2 shafts, 27,000 shp
- Speed: 34 kt
- Range: 320-370 tons oil, 3,500 nmi at 15 kt, 900 nmi at 32 kt
- Complement: 110
- Armament: 4 × QF 4 in Mk.V (102mm L/45), mount P Mk.I; 2 × QF 2 pdr Mk.II "pom-pom" (40 mm L/39) or; 1 × QF 12 pdr 20 cwt Mk.I (76 mm), mount HA Mk.II; 4 (2 x 2) tubes for 21 inch torpedoes

HMS Venetia (D53) was a V-class destroyer of the British Royal Navy that saw service in World War I and World War II.

== Construction and commissioning ==
Venetia was ordered on 30 June 1916 as part of the 9th Order of the 1916-17 Naval Programme. She was laid down on 2 February 1917 by the Fairfield Shipbuilding and Engineering Company at Govan, Scotland, and launched on 29 October 1917. She was completed on 19 December 1917 and commissioned into service the same day. Her original pennant number, F9A, was changed to F93 in January 1918 and to F14 in April 1918. It became D53 during the interwar period.

== Service history ==
=== World War I ===
The V- and W-class destroyers, Venetia among them, were assigned to the Grand Fleet or Harwich Force and saw service in the last year of World War I.

=== Interwar years ===
In 1921, as part of the 2nd Destroyer Flotilla, Venetia joined the light cruisers HMS Caledon, Castor, Cordelia, and Curacoa and the destroyers HMS Vanquisher, Vectis, Viceroy, Violent, Viscount, Winchelsea, and Wolfhound in a Baltic cruise. Departing the United Kingdom on 31 August 1921, the ships crossed the North Sea and transited the Kaiser Wilhelm Canal to enter the Baltic, where they called at Danzig in the Free City of Danzig; Memel in the Klaipėda Region; Liepāja, Latvia; Riga, Latvia; Tallinn, Estonia; Helsinki, Finland; Stockholm, Sweden; Copenhagen, Denmark; Gothenburg, Sweden; and Kristiania, Norway, before crossing the North Sea and ending the voyage at Port Edgar, Scotland, on 15 October 1921.

Venetia later served in the Home Fleet and Mediterranean Fleet before being decommissioned and placed in the Reserve Fleet.

=== World War II ===
When the United Kingdom entered World War II in September 1939, Venetia was recommissioned. In October 1939, she began service escorting convoys in the North Atlantic Ocean. On 6 January 1940, she and Winchelsea joined Convoy OG 13 in the Southwestern Approaches to serve as its escort during the first leg of its voyage to Gibraltar. The two destroyers detached from the convoy on 8 January 1940 and joined Convoy HG 13 to escort it on the final leg of its voyage from Gibraltar to Liverpool, where it arrived on 10 January 1940. On 1 March 1940, she and the sloop HMS Leith joined Convoy OG 20 in the Southwestern Approaches to escort it during the first day of its voyage to Gibraltar. The two warships detached the following day and joined Convoy HG 23 to relieve the sloop HMS Aberdeen as its escort on the final leg of its voyage from Gibraltar to Liverpool, detaching on 6 March 1940. On 7 April 1940, Venetia, the destroyer HMS Wakeful and the sloops Enchantress and Sandwich joined Convoy HG24 as its escort for the final stage of its voyage from Gibraltar to Liverpool.

In May 1940, Venetia was transferred to Nore Command for operations related to the evacuation of Allied personnel from the Netherlands, Belgium, and France because of the successful German offensive there. On 12 May, in Operation J, she and the destroyer HMS Vivacious escorted the destroyer HMS Codrington as Codrington transported the Dutch royal family from the Hook of Holland into exile in the United Kingdom.

On 23 May 1940, Venetia and the destroyers Vimiera, Whitshed, Venomous, and Wild Swan arrived off Boulogne, France, to evacuate troops of the British Army's Irish Guards and Welsh Guards, who had been trapped there by advancing German troops and tanks of the 2nd Panzer Division during the Battle of Boulogne. Sixty German Junkers Ju 87 Stuka dive bombers had recently attacked the harbour and French destroyers bombarding offshore, so they awaited the arrival of Royal Air Force fighter cover before attempting to enter the harbour. After it arrived at 19:20 hours, Whitshed and Vimiera entered the harbour first, taking aboard as many British soldiers as possible – over 550 men each – under fire from German forces before steaming back out of the harbour at 20:25 hours, with Whitshed completely destroying two German tanks at point-blank range with her 4.7-inch (120-mm) guns as she departed.

Venomous and Wild Swan entered the harbour next, at 20:35 hours, followed by Venetia at 20:40 hours. The Germans opened fire on Venetia with heavier guns as she entered the harbour, apparently in an attempt to sink her in the harbour entrance to trap Venomous and Wild Swan and bring the evacuation operation to an end. A German shell, probably from a tank, hit Venetia, starting a fire aft and prompting her crew to jettison her torpedoes and burning Carley floats. Another shell hit her "B" gun turret, blowing overboard and killing some of the men there, and German gunfire also inflicted casualties among the men on her bridge, causing her to go out of control and briefly run aground. Gunners aboard Venomous, seeing that Venetia was in danger of being sunk, realized that the Germans had captured Fort de la Crèche on a hill overlooking the entrance and were using its coastal artillery to fire on Venetia. Venomous opened fire on the fort; her first salvo went over it, but her second salvo blew off one side of the fort and much of the hillside it was on, causing artillery pieces to roll down the hill and silencing the fort. Venomous also detected a German light field gun in the garden of a house and fired on it; her first salvo flattened all of the trees in the garden, set the house on fire, and caused German troops in the vicinity to flee. All heavy German guns fell silent after this and, given a reprieve, Venetia, which had taken seven hits and been unable to embark any troops, quickly refloated herself and backed out of the harbor at full speed at 20:48 hours. Venomous and Wild Swan followed Venetia out of the harbour, also in reverse, carrying about 400 evacuees each, along the way knocking out a German tank and shooting up two German troop columns, then escorted the damaged Venetia to Dover, England.

After spending the summer of 1940 undergoing repairs, Venetia returned to Nore Command in August 1940 and began convoy defence and patrol duties in the North Sea and Thames Estuary in September 1940. On 19 October 1940, she struck a mine off Knob Buoy in the Thames Estuary 12 nautical miles (22 km) northwest of Margate, Kent, England, and sank at either 51°33′00″N 001°01′00″E or 51°33′00″N 001°10′00″E (sources differ).

== Bibliography ==
- Campbell, John (1985). Naval Weapons of World War II. Annapolis, Maryland: Naval Institute Press. ISBN 0-87021-459-4.
- Chesneau, Roger, ed. (1980). Conway's All the World's Fighting Ships 1922–1946. Greenwich, UK: Conway Maritime Press. ISBN 0-85177-146-7.
- Colledge, J. J.; Warlow, Ben (2006) [1969]. Ships of the Royal Navy: The Complete Record of All Fighting Ships of the Royal Navy from the 15th Century to the Present (3rd Rev ed.). London: Chatham Publishing. ISBN 978-1-86176-281-8. OCLC 67375475.
- Cocker, Maurice. Destroyers of the Royal Navy, 1893–1981. Ian Allan. ISBN 0-7110-1075-7.
- Friedman, Norman (2009). British Destroyers From Earliest Days to the Second World War. Annapolis, Maryland: Naval Institute Press. ISBN 978-1-59114-081-8.
- Gardiner, Robert & Gray, Randal, eds. (1985). Conway's All the World's Fighting Ships 1906–1921. Annapolis, Maryland: Naval Institute Press. ISBN 0-85177-245-5.
- Lenton, H. T. (1998). British & Empire Warships of the Second World War. Annapolis, Maryland: Naval Institute Press. ISBN 1-55750-048-7.
- March, Edgar J. (1966). British Destroyers: A History of Development, 1892–1953; Drawn by Admiralty Permission From Official Records & Returns, Ships' Covers & Building Plans. London: Seeley Service. OCLC 164893555.
- Preston, Antony (1971). 'V & W' Class Destroyers 1917–1945. London: Macdonald. OCLC 464542895.
- Raven, Alan & Roberts, John (1979). 'V' and 'W' Class Destroyers. Man o'War. Vol. 2. London: Arms & Armour. ISBN 0-85368-233-X.
- Rohwer, Jürgen (2005). Chronology of the War at Sea 1939–1945: The Naval History of World War Two (Third Revised ed.). Annapolis, Maryland: Naval Institute Press. ISBN 1-59114-119-2.
- Whinney, Bob (2000). The U-boat Peril: A Fight for Survival. Cassell. ISBN 0-304-35132-6.
- Whitley, M. J. (1988). Destroyers of World War 2. Annapolis, Maryland: Naval Institute Press. ISBN 0-87021-326-1.
- Winser, John de D. (1999). B.E.F. Ships Before, At and After Dunkirk. Gravesend, Kent: World Ship Society. ISBN 0-905617-91-6.
