= HMS Vectis (D51) =

Destroyer of the Royal Navy

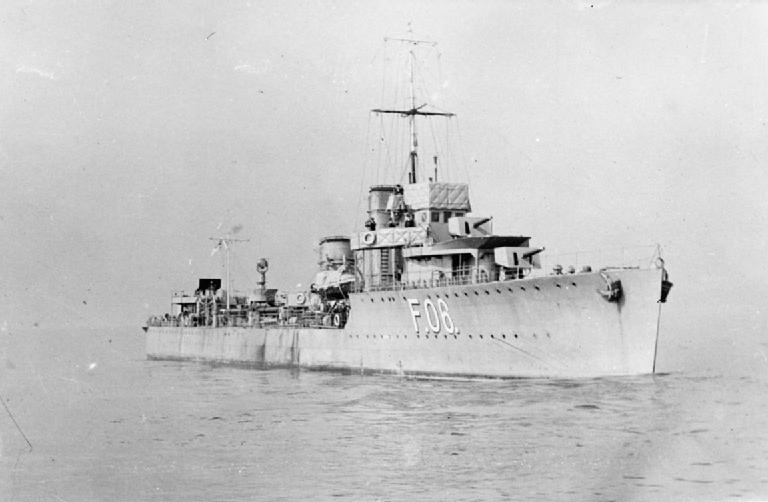
- HMS Vectis in 1918.

History

United Kingdom
- Name: HMS Vectis
- Namesake: Vectis, the ancient Roman name for the Isle of Wight
- Ordered: July 1916
- Builder: J. Samuel White, Cowes, Isle of Wight
- Launched: 4 September 1917
- Completed: 5 December 1917
- Identification: Pennant number: D51
- Fate: Transferred for scrapping 25 August 1936

General characteristics
- Class & type: Admiralty V-class destroyer
- Displacement: 1,272–1,339 tons
- Length: 300 ft (91.4 m) o/a, 312 ft (95.1 m) p/p
- Beam: 26 ft 9 in (8.2 m)
- Draught: 9 ft (2.7 m) standard, 11 ft 3 in (3.4 m) deep
- Propulsion: 3 Yarrow type Water-tube boilers; Brown-Curtis steam turbines; 2 shafts, 27,000 shp
- Speed: 34 kn
- Range: 320–370 tons oil, 3,500 nmi at 15 kn, 900 nmi at 32 kn
- Complement: 110
- Armament: 4 × QF 4 in Mk.V (102mm L/45), mount P Mk.I; 2 × QF 2 pdr Mk.II "pom-pom" (40 mm L/39) or; 1 z QF 12 pdr 20 cwt Mk.I (76 mm), mount HA Mk.II; 4 (2x2) tubes for 21 in torpedoes

HMS Vectis (D51) was a V-class destroyer of the British Royal Navy that saw service in World War I and the Russian Civil War.

== Construction and commissioning ==
Vectis, the first Royal Navy ship of the name, was ordered in July 1916. She was laid down by J. Samuel White at Cowes, Isle of Wight and launched on 4 September 1917. She was completed on 5 December 1917.

== Service history ==
Although reportedly completed on 5 December 1917, she was listed as being commissioned on 15 November 1917, prior to her completion. In December 1917, she was assigned to the 13th Destroyer Flotilla in the Grand Fleet.

In early June 1918, Vectis conducted towing trials with the NS-class airship N.S.3 to see if an airship which ran out of fuel or suffered a mechanical breakdown could be towed at speed by a ship at sea. Trials were successful, with Vectis reaching nearly 20 knots (37 km/h; 23 mph) with N.S.3 in tow. Before the final run, N.S.3 landed on the sea to exchange two officers from Vectis for two of her own crew.

After the armistice with Germany of 11 November 1918 brought World War I to an end, Vectis was incorporated into a new 3rd Destroyer Division, 2nd Destroyer Flotilla, in the spring of 1919. With the new formation, she took part during 1919 in the British campaign in the Baltic Sea against Bolshevik forces during the Russian Civil War.

Vectis was among the ships which accompanied the battlecruisers HMS Hood and HMS Tiger during their visit to Scandinavian ports in June 1920. During the voyage, she and the destroyer HMS Vega tested the Royal Navy's High Speed Mine Sweep, which the British Admiralty hoped to use in the shallow waters of the Baltic in the event of a war with Bolshevik Russia (soon to become the Soviet Union). In a blow to the Admiralty's plans, both destroyers lost their minesweeping apparatus, demonstrating the High Speed Mine Sweep to be impractical in shallow water.

Vectis recommissioned on 27 August 1920. In 1921, she joined the light cruisers HMS Caledon, HMS Castor, HMS Cordelia, and HMS Curacoa and the destroyers HMS Vanquisher, HMS Venetia, HMS Viceroy, HMS Violent, HMS Viscount, HMS Winchelsea, and HMS Wolfhound in a Baltic cruise, departing the United Kingdom on 31 August 1921. The ships crossed the North Sea and transited the Kaiser Wilhelm Canal to enter the Baltic, where they called at Danzig in the Free City of Danzig; Memel in the Klaipėda Region; Liepāja, Latvia; Riga, Latvia; Tallinn, Estonia; Helsinki, Finland; Stockholm, Sweden; Copenhagen, Denmark; Gothenburg, Sweden; and Kristiania, Norway, before crossing the North Sea and ending the voyage at Port Edgar, Scotland, on 15 October 1921.

Vectis recommissioned at Devonport on 4 December 1923. On 21 January 1925, she took part with Royal Air Force bombers, the light cruisers Caledon, HMS Calliope, HMS Carysfort, and Curacoa, the battlecruisers Hood and HMS Repulse, and the battleships HMS Ramillies, HMS Resolution, HMS Revenge, HMS Royal Oak, and HMS Royal Sovereign in sinking the decommissioned battleship HMS Monarch as a target 50 nautical miles (93 km; 58 mi) south of the Scilly Isles, firing her 4-inch (102-mm) guns at Monarch. By March 1925 she was operating as part of the 9th Destroyer Flotilla in the Atlantic Fleet. She recommissioned with a reserve crew on 23 November 1925.

Vectis recommissioned on 31 January 1927 for service with the 7th Destroyer Flotilla in the Atlantic Fleet. She underwent a re-tubing of her boilers at Sheerness Dockyard, and it was completed on 1 March 1927. She again recommissioned on 1 April 1928.

== Final disposition ==
After World War I, the United Kingdom received the passenger liner SS Bismarck from Germany in 1920 as a war reparation, and she was sold to the White Star Line, later the Cunard White Star Line, in which she served as RMS Majestic. In 1936, Cunard White Star retired Majestic and sold her to Thos. W. Ward for scrapping, but because of legal requirements imposed under the agreement transferring Majestic to the United Kingdom as a war prize, the British government instead took control of Majestic and assigned her to the Royal Navy. To pay Thos W Ward for Majestic, the Royal Navy agreed to transfer 24 old destroyers with a combined scrap value equivalent to that of Majestic to Thos. W. Ward for scrapping. Vectis was among these, and her transfer to Thos W Ward for scrapping took place on 25 August 1936. She was scrapped at Inverkeithing, Scotland.

== Bibliography ==
- Chesneau, Roger, ed. (1980). Conway's All the World's Fighting Ships 1922–1946. Greenwich, UK: Conway Maritime Press. ISBN 0-85177-146-7.
- Colledge, J. J.; Warlow, Ben (2006) [1969]. Ships of the Royal Navy: The Complete Record of All Fighting Ships of the Royal Navy from the 15th Century to the Present (3rd Rev ed.). London: Chatham Publishing. ISBN 978-1-86176-281-8. OCLC 67375475.
- Cocker, Maurice. Destroyers of the Royal Navy, 1893–1981. Ian Allan. ISBN 0-7110-1075-7.
- Friedman, Norman (2009). British Destroyers From Earliest Days to the Second World War. Annapolis, Maryland: Naval Institute Press. ISBN 978-1-59114-081-8.
- Gardiner, Robert & Gray, Randal, eds. (1985). Conway's All the World's Fighting Ships 1906–1921. Annapolis, Maryland: Naval Institute Press. ISBN 0-85177-245-5.
- March, Edgar J. (1966). British Destroyers: A History of Development, 1892–1953; Drawn by Admiralty Permission From Official Records & Returns, Ships' Covers & Building Plans. London: Seeley Service. OCLC 164893555.
- Preston, Antony (1971). 'V & W' Class Destroyers 1917–1945. London: Macdonald. OCLC 464542895.
- Raven, Alan & Roberts, John (1979). 'V' and 'W' Class Destroyers. Man o'War. Vol. 2. London: Arms & Armour. ISBN 0-85368-233-X.
