= HMS Castor (1915) =

Royal Navy C-class light cruiser

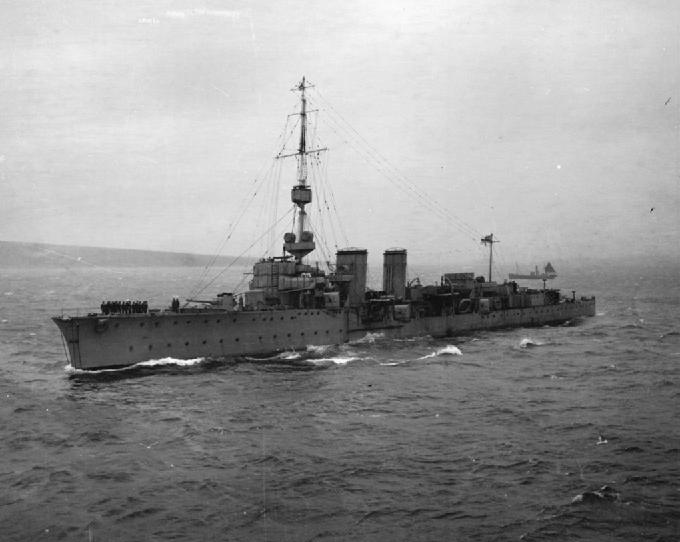

History

United Kingdom
- Name: Castor
- Builder: Cammell Laird
- Laid down: 28 October 1914
- Launched: 28 July 1915
- Completed: November 1915
- Commissioned: November 1915
- Decommissioned: May 1935
- Identification: Pennant number: C4 (1914); 33 (Jan 18); 20 (Apr 18); 85 (Nov 19)
- Fate: Sold 30 July 1936 for scrapping

General characteristics
- Class & type: C-class light cruiser
- Displacement: 3,750 long tons (3,810 t)
- Length: 446 ft (135.9 m)
- Beam: 41.5 ft (12.6 m)
- Draught: 15 ft (4.6 m)
- Installed power: 8 Yarrow boilers; 40,000 shp (30,000 kW)
- Propulsion: 4 propellers; 2 steam turbines
- Speed: 28.5 knots (52.8 km/h; 32.8 mph)
- Complement: 323
- Armament: 4 × single 6 in (152 mm) guns; 1 × single 4 in (102 mm) gun; 2 × single 3 in (76 mm) guns; 2 × single 2 pdr (40 mm (1.6 in)) AA guns; 2 × twin 21 in (533 mm) torpedo tubes
- Armour: 3 inch side (amidships); 2¼-1½ inch side (bows); 2½ - 2 inch side (stern); 1 inch upper decks (amidships); 1 inch deck over rudder

HMS Castor was one of the Cambrian subclass of the C class of light cruisers. She saw service during the First World War and the Russian Civil War.

== Construction ==
Design of the Cambrian subclass was based on the earlier light cruisers HMS Champion and HMS Calliope, which, in turn, were based on the Caroline subclass, using the same hull as the Carolines but with two funnels and a maximum armor thickness of 4 inches (102 mm) as opposed to 3 in (76 mm) in the Carolines.

Castor was built by Cammell Laird at Birkenhead, England. Laid down on 28 October 1914, she was launched on 28 July 1915 and completed in November 1915.

== Service history ==
=== World War I ===
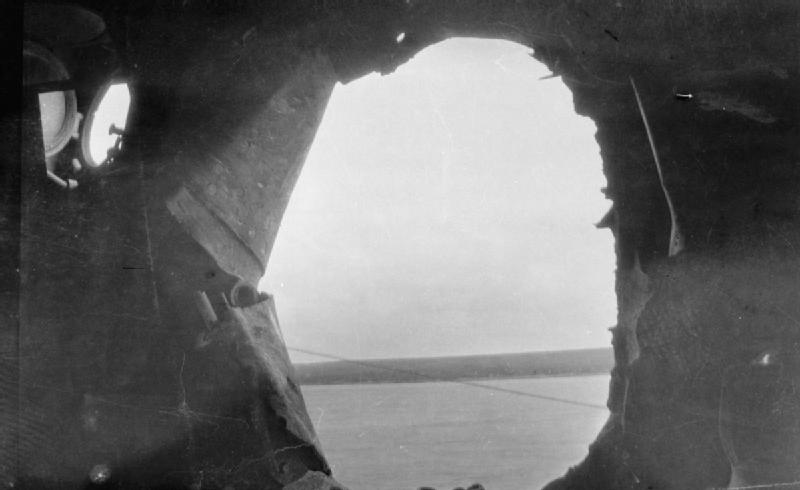
Large shell hole in the side of Castor after the Battle of Jutland

Commissioned in November 1915, Castor was the flagship of Commodore (D), assigned to the 11th Destroyer Flotilla in the Grand Fleet. She fought in the Battle of Jutland, in which she was damaged by German gunfire and suffered 10 casualties.

On 4 October 1917, the United States Navy patrol vessel USS Rehoboth suffered an uncontrollable leak in her hull while on patrol duty off France. Rehoboth's crew had to be taken off, and Castor sank her with gunfire.

=== Post-war ===
After the First World War, Castor served in the Black Sea from 1919 to 1920 during the British intervention in the Russian Civil War. In April 1920, she recommissioned at Chatham Dockyard for service in the 2nd Light Cruiser Squadron in the Atlantic Fleet.

In 1921, Castor joined the light cruisers HMS Caledon, Cordelia, and Curacoa and the destroyers Vanquisher, Vectis, Venetia, Viceroy, Violent, Viscount, Winchelsea, and Wolfhound in a Baltic Sea cruise, departing the United Kingdom on 31 August 1921. The ships crossed the North Sea and transited the Kaiser Wilhelm Canal to enter the Baltic, where they called at Danzig in the Free City of Danzig; Memel in the Klaipėda Region; Liepāja, Latvia; Riga, Latvia; Tallinn, Estonia; Helsinki, Finland; Stockholm, Sweden; Copenhagen, Denmark; Gothenburg, Sweden; and Kristiania, Norway, before crossing the North Sea and ending the voyage at Port Edgar, Scotland, on 15 October 1921.

Castor patrolled off the coast of Ireland in 1922 during the Irish Civil War. She was assigned to the Gunnery School at Portsmouth from 1923 to 1924, then was in the Nore Reserve from 1924 to 1925.

Castor underwent a refit from November 1925 to September 1926, then began transporting troops to China in October 1927. She recommissioned at Devonport in June 1928 to serve on the China Station. She entered the Devonport Reserve in July 1930, then was decommissioned in May 1935.

== Disposal ==
Castor was sold on 30 July 1936 for scrapping and arrived at the shipbreaker's yard at Rosyth in August 1936.
