= HMS Cordelia (1914) =

C-class light cruiser in the Royal Navy

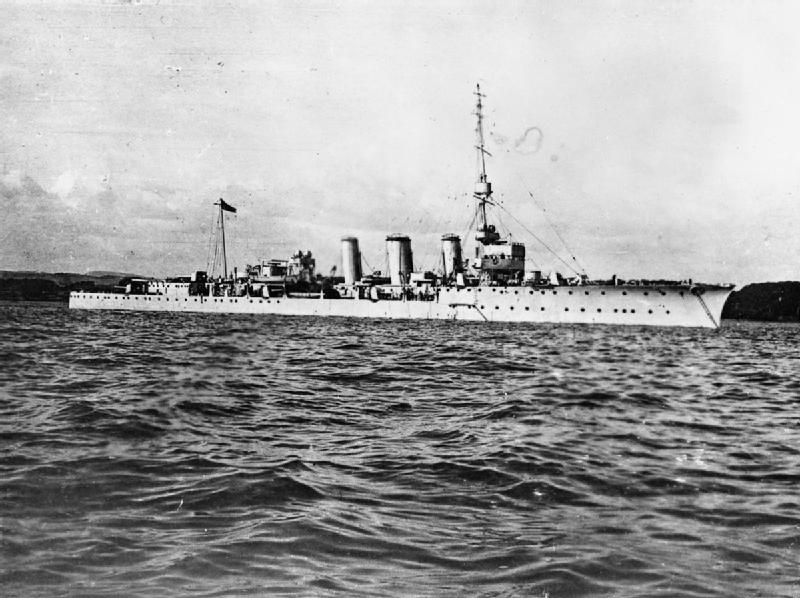
- Cordelia during World War I

History

United Kingdom
- Name: Cordelia
- Namesake: Cordelia of Britain
- Builder: HM Dockyard, Pembroke
- Laid down: 21 July 1913
- Launched: 23 February 1914
- Completed: January 1915
- Commissioned: January 1915
- Decommissioned: 1919
- Recommissioned: January 1920
- Decommissioned: December 1922
- Identification: Pennant number: 78 (1914); 50 (Jan 18); 69 (Apr 18); P.09 (Nov 19); 65 (Jan 22)
- Fate: Sold for scrap, 31 July 1923

General characteristics (as built)
- Class & type: C-class light cruiser
- Displacement: 4,175 long tons (4,242 t) (normal)
- Length: 446 ft (135.9 m) (o/a)
- Beam: 41 ft 6 in (12.6 m)
- Draught: 16 ft (4.9 m) (mean)
- Installed power: 8 × Yarrow boilers; 40,000 shp (30,000 kW)
- Propulsion: 2 × shafts; 2 × steam turbines
- Speed: 28.5 knots (52.8 km/h; 32.8 mph)
- Range: 3,680 nmi (6,820 km; 4,230 mi) at 18 knots (33 km/h; 21 mph)
- Complement: 301
- Armament: 2 × single 6 in (152 mm) guns; 8 × single 4 in (102 mm) guns; 1 × single 6 pdr (2.2 in (57 mm)) AA gun; 2 × twin 21 in (533 mm) torpedo tubes
- Armour: Waterline belt: 1–3 in (25–76 mm); Deck: 1 in (25 mm); Conning tower: 6 in

HMS Cordelia was a C-class light cruiser built for the Royal Navy during World War I. She was one of six ships of the Caroline sub-class and was completed at the beginning of 1915. The ship was assigned to the 1st and 4th Light Cruiser Squadrons (LCS) of the Grand Fleet for the entire war and played a minor role in the Battle of Jutland in mid-1916. Cordelia spent most of her time on uneventful patrols of the North Sea. She served as a training ship for most of 1919 before she was recommissioned for service with the Atlantic Fleet in 1920. The ship was placed in reserve at the end of 1922 and was sold for scrap in mid-1923.

== Design and description ==
The C-class cruisers were intended to escort the fleet and defend it against enemy destroyers attempting to close within torpedo range. Ordered in July–August 1913 as part of the 1913–14 Naval Programme, the Carolines were enlarged and improved versions of the preceding Arethusa-class cruisers. The ships were 446 feet (135.9 m) long overall, with a beam of 41 feet 6 inches (12.6 m) and a mean draught of 16 feet (4.9 m). Cordelia displaced 4,175 long tons (4,242 t) at normal load and 4,676 long tons (4,751 t) at deep load. She had a metacentric height of 1.33 ft (0.41 m) at light load and 2.78 ft (0.85 m) at deep load.

The Carolines were powered by four direct-drive Parsons steam turbines, each driving one propeller shaft using steam generated by eight Yarrow boilers. The turbines produced a total of 40,000 shaft horsepower (30,000 kW) which gave them a speed of 28.5 knots (52.8 km/h; 32.8 mph). The ships carried enough fuel oil to give them a range of 3,680 nautical miles (6,820 km; 4,230 mi) at 18 knots (33 km/h; 21 mph). The ship had a crew of 301 officers and ratings.

The main armament of the Carolines consisted of two BL six-inch (152 mm) Mk XII guns that were mounted on the centreline in the stern, with one gun superfiring over the rearmost gun. Her secondary armament consisted of eight QF four-inch (102 mm) Mk IV guns in single pivot mounts; four on each side, one pair forward of the bridge, another pair abaft it on the forecastle deck and the other two pairs one deck lower amidships. For anti-aircraft defence, the ships were fitted with one QF six-pounder (2.2 in (57 mm)) Hotchkiss gun. They also mounted a pair of twin-tube rotating mounts for 21-inch (533 mm) torpedoes, one on each broadside. The Carolines were protected by a waterline belt amidships that ranged in thickness from 1–3 inches (25–76 mm) and a 1-inch (25 mm) deck. The walls of their conning tower were six inches thick.

=== Wartime modifications ===
In August 1915, her six-pounder anti-aircraft (AA) gun was replaced by an Ordnance QF three-pounder (1.9-inch (47 mm)) Vickers Mk II AA gun. In September–October 1917 the ship's armament was extensively revised. Her forward pair of 4-inch guns were replaced by another six-inch gun, her aftmost four-inch guns were replaced by another pair of 21-inch torpedo mounts and a QF four-inch Mk V gun replaced her three-pounder AA gun. In addition, her pole foremast was replaced by a tripod mast that was fitted with a gunnery director, her conning tower was replaced by a lighter one with thinner armour (0.75 inches (19 mm)) and a flying-off platform installed over the forecastle. This was removed between April and August 1918 when an additional six-inch gun was added abaft the funnels in lieu of her forward main-deck four-inch guns. Cordelia's last four-inch guns, including the Mk V AA gun, were replaced in 1919 by a pair of QF three-inch (76 mm) 20-cwt (Note: "Cwt" is the abbreviation for hundredweight, 20 cwt referring to the weight of the gun.) AA guns abaft the bridge, where the four-inch guns had originally been located. Sometime between 1919 and 1923, the ship received a pair of two-pounder (1.6-inch (40 mm)) Mk II "pom-pom" guns on single mounts. All of these changes adversely affected the ship's stability and the additional 21-inch torpedo tubes and the aft control position were removed by the end of 1921.

== Construction and career ==
Cordelia, the third ship of her name in the Royal Navy, was laid down by Pembroke Dockyard in Pembroke Dock, Wales, on 21 July 1913. She was launched on 23 February 1914, and completed in January 1915. Commissioned into service in the Royal Navy that same month, Cordelia was assigned to the 1st Light Cruiser Squadron (LCS) of the Grand Fleet.

In early August 1914, Cordelia and the rest of her squadron were among the ships dispatched to hunt for the German commerce raider SMS Meteor, which was trying to return to Germany. Although the squadron did not find her, the German ship was forced to scuttle herself by other British cruisers on 9 August to avoid being captured.

During the Battle of Jutland on 31 May-1 June 1916, the 1st LCS was assigned to screen Vice-Admiral David Beatty's battlecruisers and were the first British ships to spot and engage the ships of the German High Seas Fleet on the afternoon of 31 May. Cordelia fired four rounds from her main armament at the light cruiser Elbing, but they fell short of the target. The ship was not heavily engaged during the battle and only fired a total of a dozen rounds from her six-inch guns and three from her four-inch guns. So far as is known, she did not hit anything, nor was she damaged herself. By October 1917, she had been transferred to the 4th Light Cruiser Squadron.

Cordelia remained with the 4th LCS through at least 1 February 1919. Later that month, she was reduced to reserve at Devonport. By 1 May 1919, however, she had been assigned to the Devonport Gunnery School, and by 18 January 1920 she had recommissioned for service in the 2nd Light Cruiser Squadron in the Atlantic Fleet. and remained there through 18 December 1920.

In 1921, Cordelia joined the light cruisers Caledon, Castor, and Curacoa and the destroyers Vanquisher, Vectis, Venetia, Viceroy, Violent, Viscount, Winchelsea, and Wolfhound in a Baltic cruise, departing British waters on 1 September. The ships crossed the North Sea and transited the Kaiser Wilhelm Canal to enter the Baltic Sea, where they called at Danzig in the Free City of Danzig; Memel in the Klaipėda Region; Liepāja and Riga, Latvia; Tallinn, Estonia; Helsinki, Finland; Stockholm, Sweden; Copenhagen, Denmark; Gothenburg, Sweden; and Kristiania, Norway. The ships left Kristiania on 13 September, making for Invergordon.

Cordelia patrolled off the coast of Ireland in 1922 during the Irish Civil War. In December 1922, she was decommissioned and placed in the Nore Reserve. She was sold for scrap in July 1923.
