= USS Rehoboth (SP-384) =

History

United States
- Name: USS Rehoboth
- Namesake: The city of Rehoboth Beach, Delaware (previous name retained)
- Builder: W. G. Abbott, Milford, Delaware
- Completed: 1912
- Acquired: 1917
- Commissioned: 12 May 1917
- Fate: Foundered, 4 October 1917
- Notes: Operated as private fishing vessel Rehoboth 1912-1917

General characteristics
- Type: Patrol vessel
- Length: 150 ft (46 m)
- Beam: 24 ft (7.3 m)
- Draft: 13 ft (4.0 m) mean
- Propulsion: Steam engine(s)
- Speed: 11 kn (13 mph; 20 km/h)
- Complement: 28
- Armament: 2 × 3 in (76 mm) guns

The first USS Rehoboth (SP-384) was a United States Navy patrol vessel in commission in 1917.

Rehoboth was built in 1912 as a fishing vessel by W. G. Abbott, Milford, Delaware. The U.S. Navy acquired her from W. C. Lofland of Lewes, Delaware, for service during World War I, armed her, designated her SP-384, and commissioned her at Philadelphia, Pennsylvania on 12 May 1917.

Acquired originally for section patrol duty, Rehoboth was designated for distant service in June 1917, and on 14 August 1917 headed for Boston, Massachusetts. At the end of August 1917, she continued on across the Atlantic Ocean. Steaming via the Azores, she reached Brest, France on 18 September 1917 and began operations as a unit of Division 12, Patrol Force.

On 4 October 1917, while Rehoboth was on escort duty, her hull began to leak. Her crew — unable to control the flooding — was taken off, and she was sunk by the British light cruiser HMS Castor.
