= HMS Lochinvar (shore establishment) =

Coordinates: 55.993°N 3.418°W

HMS Lochinvar was a minesweeping training "stone frigate" (shore establishment) of the Royal Navy, sited at Port Edgar on the Firth of Forth. It was established in 1939. From 1943 to 1946 it was temporarily transferred to nearby Granton Harbour while Port Edgar became a training centre for the 1944 Normandy Landings. HMS Lochinvar closed in 1975 when its operations moved across the Forth to HMS Caledonia in the rebuilt naval base at Rosyth.

Previously the name HMS Lochinvar had been used for a First World War-era Laforey-class destroyer launched in 1915 and scrapped in 1921.
