= Port Edgar =

Marina in South Queensferry, Scotland

Coordinates: 55.993°N 3.409°W

Port Edgar as viewed from the Forth road bridge in 2010.

Port Edgar is a marina on the southern shore of the Firth of Forth, immediately west of the Forth Road Bridge and the town of South Queensferry, in Edinburgh, Scotland. Originally a naval base, HMS Lochinvar, Port Edgar is now a busy marina with a sailing school and 300 berths. The Edgar commemorated in the name is Edgar Aetheling, the brother of Queen Margaret (for whom Queensferry is named).

Previously operated by Edinburgh Leisure, the private investment company Port Edgar Marina Limited took over management of the marina in April 2014. Part of the group's £1.5m development plans included a capital dredging project to alleviate concerns about harbour depth. Prior to this project, activity at Port Edgar was threatened by the failure of successive management structures to maintain harbour depths through dredging after the departure of the Royal Navy.

== The Royal Navy ==
Bought by the Admiralty in 1916 as the site of a future Naval base, the pier at Port Edgar had been regularly used by Royal Navy ships since the 1850s.

Shortly after its purchase, the wounded of the Battle of Jutland were landed at Port Edgar for the Royal Naval Hospital at Butlaw, Queensferry. The dead of the battle were buried in the local cemetery.

In 1917 the completed base was commissioned as HMS Columbine, a depot for Torpedo Boat Destroyers of the Grand Fleet. HMS Columbine and the naval hospital at Butlaw were closed in 1938.

In 1939, at the outbreak of the Second World War, Port Edgar was commissioned as HMS Lochinvar, a training establishment for the Royal Naval Patrol Service.

In 1943 HMS Lochinvar relocated to Granton Harbour just a few miles along the coast. Port Edgar became the home to HMS Hopetoun, a Combined Operations training centre for British and Allied navies training for the D-Day landings in France.

After the war, HMS Hopetoun closed and in 1946 HMS Lochinvar returned to Port Edgar. It was now home to the Royal Navy minesweepers clearing the Firth of Forth and the eastern coast of Britain of its wartime minefields.

In 1958 the Royal Navy Fishery Protection Squadron was moved to HMS Lochinvar. By 1960 the port also became the Navy's only minesweeping training establishment.

In 1975 HMS Lochinvar closed and all its operations moved across the Forth to HMS Caledonia in the rebuilt naval base at Rosyth.

Today Port Edgar is owned by Port Edgar Holdings Ltd and is a marina for pleasure craft and a base for other watersports. It sits just west of the Forth Road Bridge, within sight of the 1890 Rail Bridge, and in the shadow of the new Queensferry Crossing.

In 1988 the Algerines Association unveiled a memorial at Port Edgar to the minesweepers and fishery protection vessels based at Port Edgar and Granton between 1939 and 1975.

=== HMS Temeraire ===
From 1955 to 1960 Port Edgar was the home to the stone frigate HMS Temeraire, the training location of the Upper Yardman Scheme.

== Gallery ==
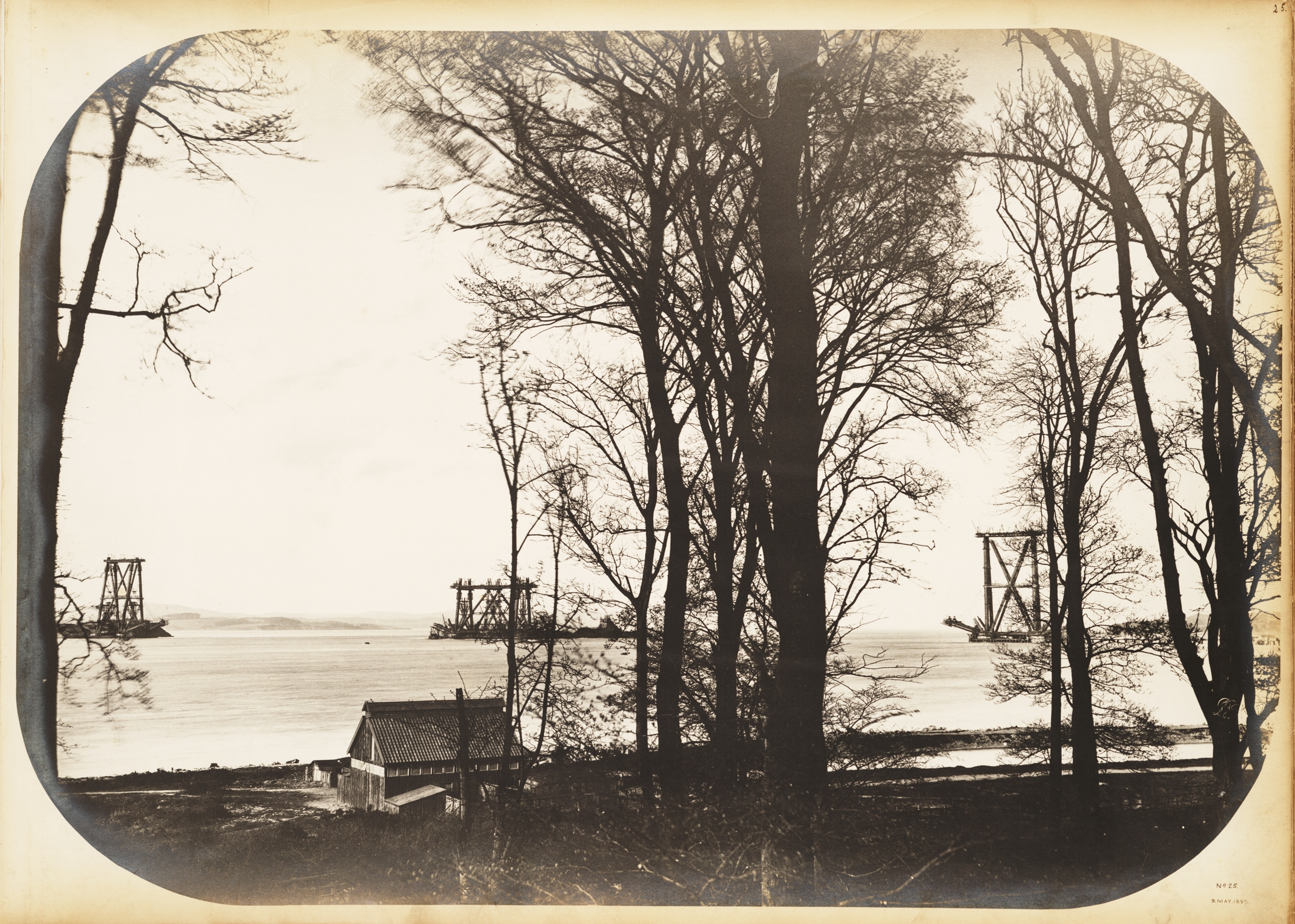
The construction of the Forth Bridge as seen from Port Edgar, 1887

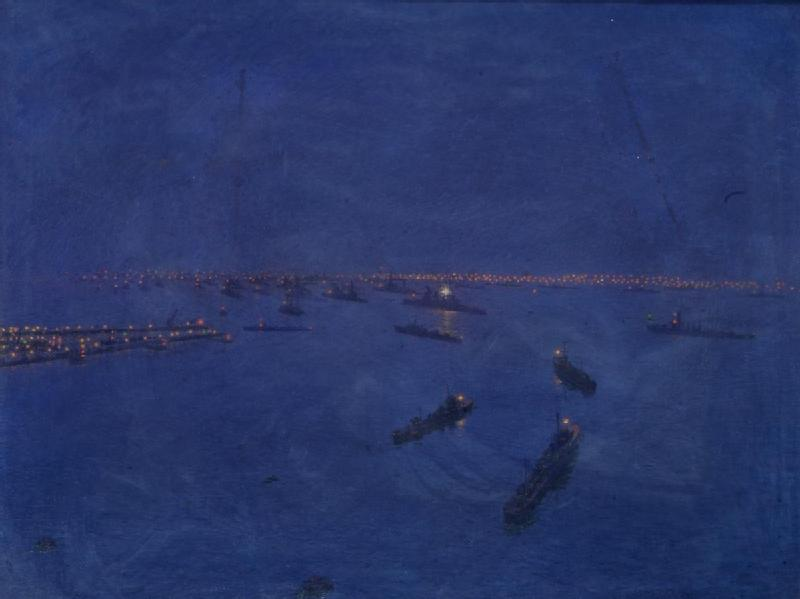
Battleships in the Forth, 1914

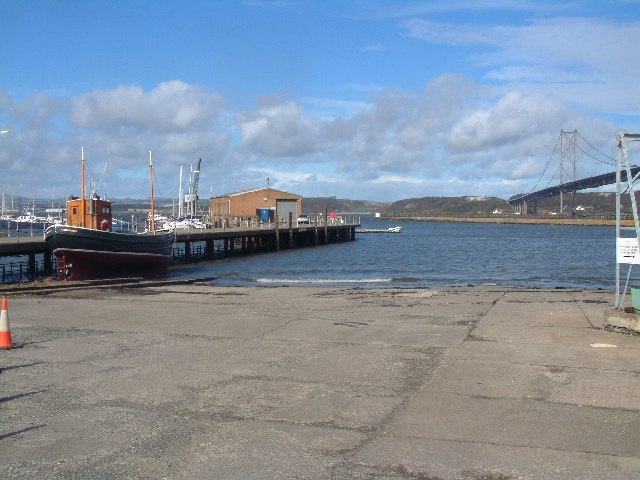
The main slipway

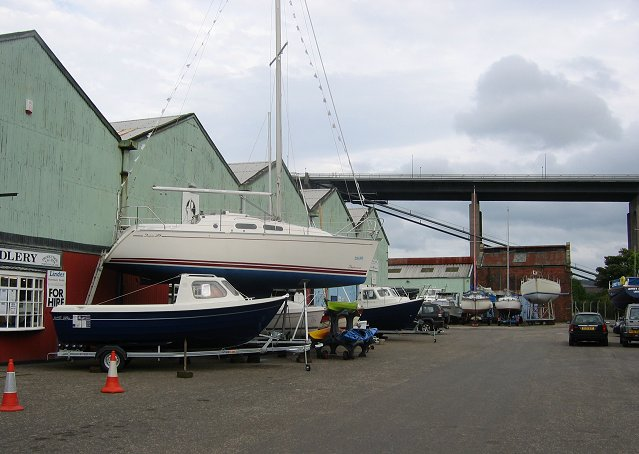
The centre of the marina

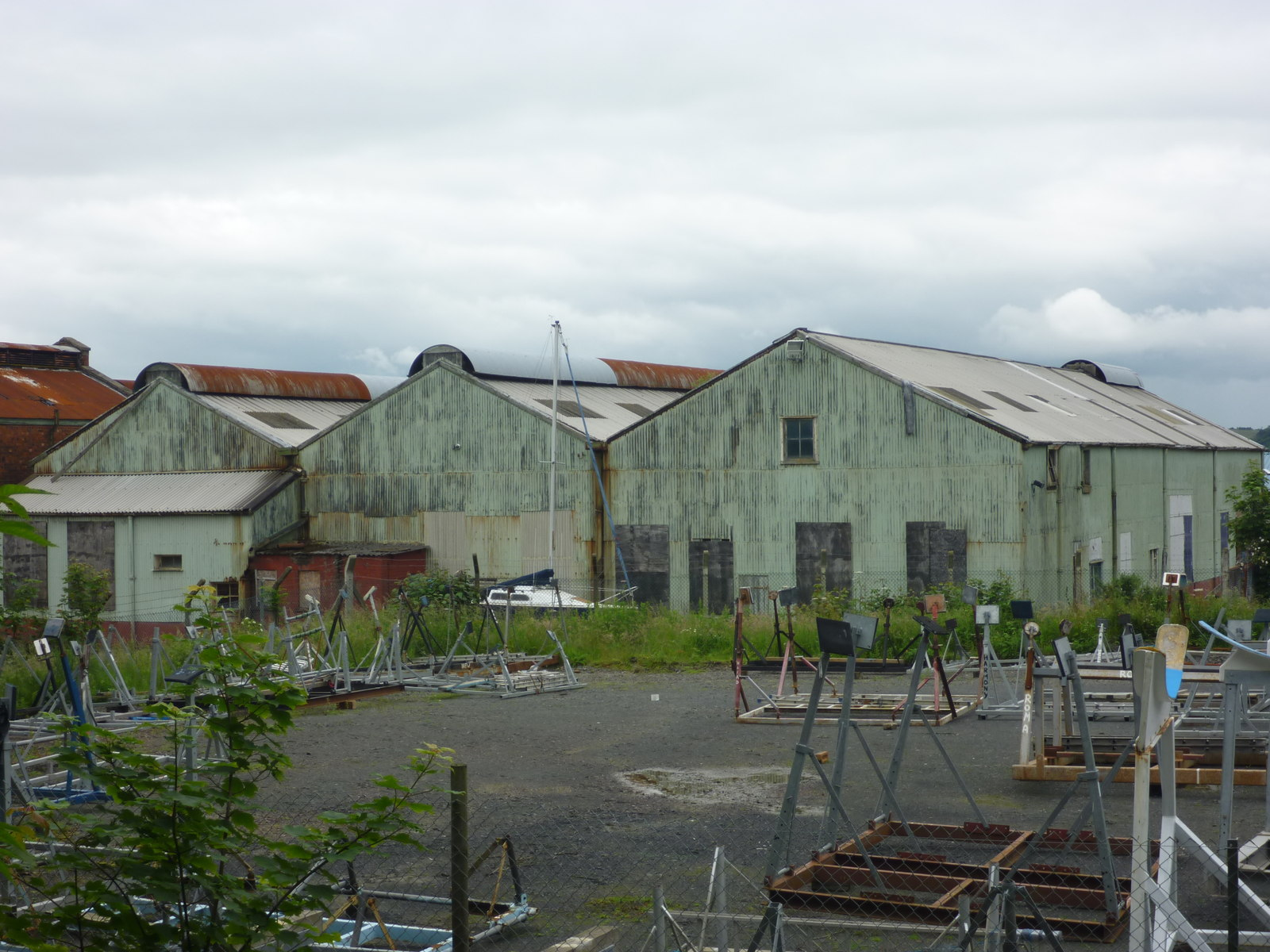
Derelict iron sheds, now demolished

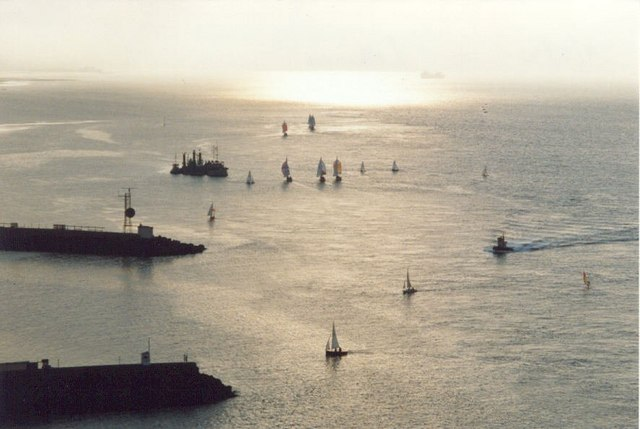
Various craft at the entrance of the marina

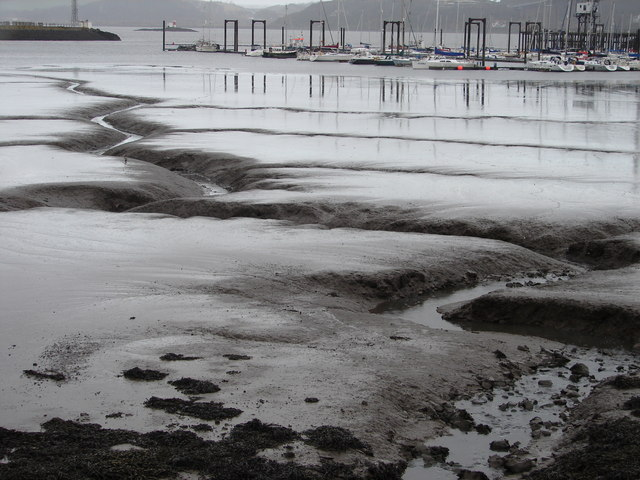
The mudflats

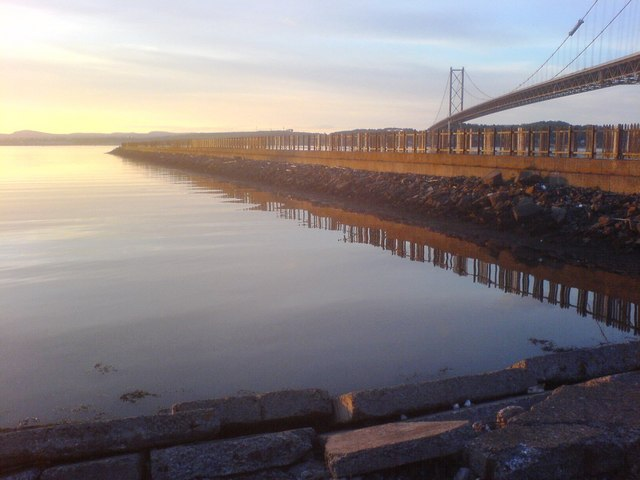
The eastern breakwater at eventide

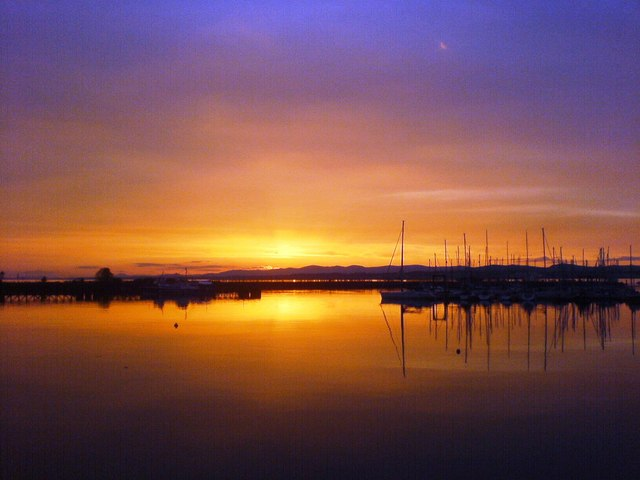
Twilight at Port Edgar

== See also ==
- Forth Road Bridge
- Forth Bridge
- Military of Scotland
- Royal Navy
- South Queensferry
