= HMS Winchelsea (D46) =

Destroyer of the Royal Navy

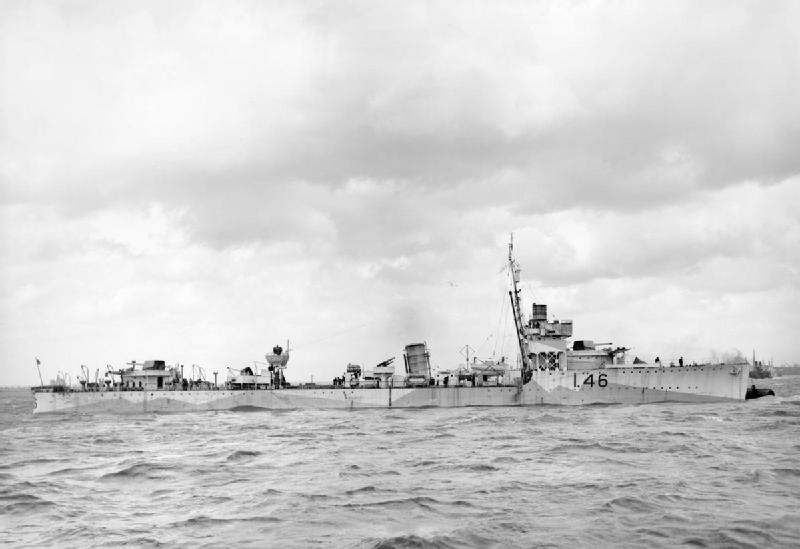
- Winchelsea during World War II

History

United Kingdom
- Name: HMS Winchelsea (D46)
- Ordered: 9 December 1916
- Builder: J. Samuel White
- Laid down: 25 May 1917
- Launched: 15 December 1917
- Decommissioned: March 1945
- Fate: Scrapped August 1945

General characteristics
- Class & type: W class destroyer

HMS Winchelsea (D46) was an Admiralty W-class destroyer of the Royal Navy, ordered 9 December 1916 from J. Samuel White at Cowes during the 1916–17 Build Programme.

Winchelsea was launched on 15 December 1917 and was the 7th Royal Navy ship to carry this name, introduced in 1694 and named after the 6th Earl of Winchilsea (1647–1730)

In March 1945 she was decommissioned and sold for scrap.

== Events in history ==
September 1939 – with the 11th Destroyer Flotilla.

26 May–4 June 1940 – the Dunkirk evacuation, code-named Operation Dynamo.

27 July 1940 – 84 survivors from the British freighters Sambre and Thiara were picked up. They had been torpedoed and sunk by the German submarine U-34 (1936), south-south-west of Rockall.

13-17 September 1940 – Escorts Convoy OB 213. After Winchelsea leaves, two ships in the convoy, including the child evacuation ship SS City of Benares, were attacked by a submarine. 260 people, including 258 passengers and crew from the Benares, are killed.

17 September 1940 – 25 survivors from the British freighter Crown Arun were picked up after the ship had been torpedoed and then sunk with gunfire by the German submarine U-99, north of Rockall.

2 November 1942 – 24 survivors were picked up after the British freighter Hartington had been torpedoed and sunk by U-521, approximately 450 nautical miles (830 km) east of Belle Isle.

== See also ==
- Winchelsea

== Bibliography ==
- Campbell, John (1985). Naval Weapons of World War II. Annapolis, Maryland: Naval Institute Press. ISBN 0-87021-459-4.
- Chesneau, Roger, ed. (1980). Conway's All the World's Fighting Ships 1922–1946. Greenwich, UK: Conway Maritime Press. ISBN 0-85177-146-7.
- Colledge, J. J.; Warlow, Ben (2006) [1969]. Ships of the Royal Navy: The Complete Record of All Fighting Ships of the Royal Navy from the 15th Century to the Present (3rd Rev ed.). London: Chatham Publishing. ISBN 978-1-86176-281-8. OCLC 67375475.
- Cocker, Maurice. Destroyers of the Royal Navy, 1893–1981. Ian Allan. ISBN 0-7110-1075-7.
- Friedman, Norman (2009). British Destroyers From Earliest Days to the Second World War. Annapolis, Maryland: Naval Institute Press. ISBN 978-1-59114-081-8.
- Gardiner, Robert & Gray, Randal, eds. (1985). Conway's All the World's Fighting Ships 1906–1921. Annapolis, Maryland: Naval Institute Press. ISBN 0-85177-245-5.
- Lenton, H. T. (1998). British & Empire Warships of the Second World War. Annapolis, Maryland: Naval Institute Press. ISBN 1-55750-048-7.
- March, Edgar J. (1966). British Destroyers: A History of Development, 1892–1953; Drawn by Admiralty Permission From Official Records & Returns, Ships' Covers & Building Plans. London: Seeley Service. OCLC 164893555.
- Preston, Antony (1971). 'V & W' Class Destroyers 1917–1945. London: Macdonald. OCLC 464542895.
- Raven, Alan & Roberts, John (1979). 'V' and 'W' Class Destroyers. Man o'War. Vol. 2. London: Arms & Armour. ISBN 0-85368-233-X.
- Rohwer, Jürgen (2005). Chronology of the War at Sea 1939–1945: The Naval History of World War Two (Third Revised ed.). Annapolis, Maryland: Naval Institute Press. ISBN 1-59114-119-2.
- Whinney, Bob (2000). The U-boat Peril: A Fight for Survival. Cassell. ISBN 0-304-35132-6.
- Whitley, M. J. (1988). Destroyers of World War 2. Annapolis, Maryland: Naval Institute Press. ISBN 0-87021-326-1.
- Winser, John de D. (1999). B.E.F. Ships Before, At and After Dunkirk. Gravesend, Kent: World Ship Society. ISBN 0-905617-91-6.
