= HMS Caledon (D53) =

Royal Navy C-class light cruiser

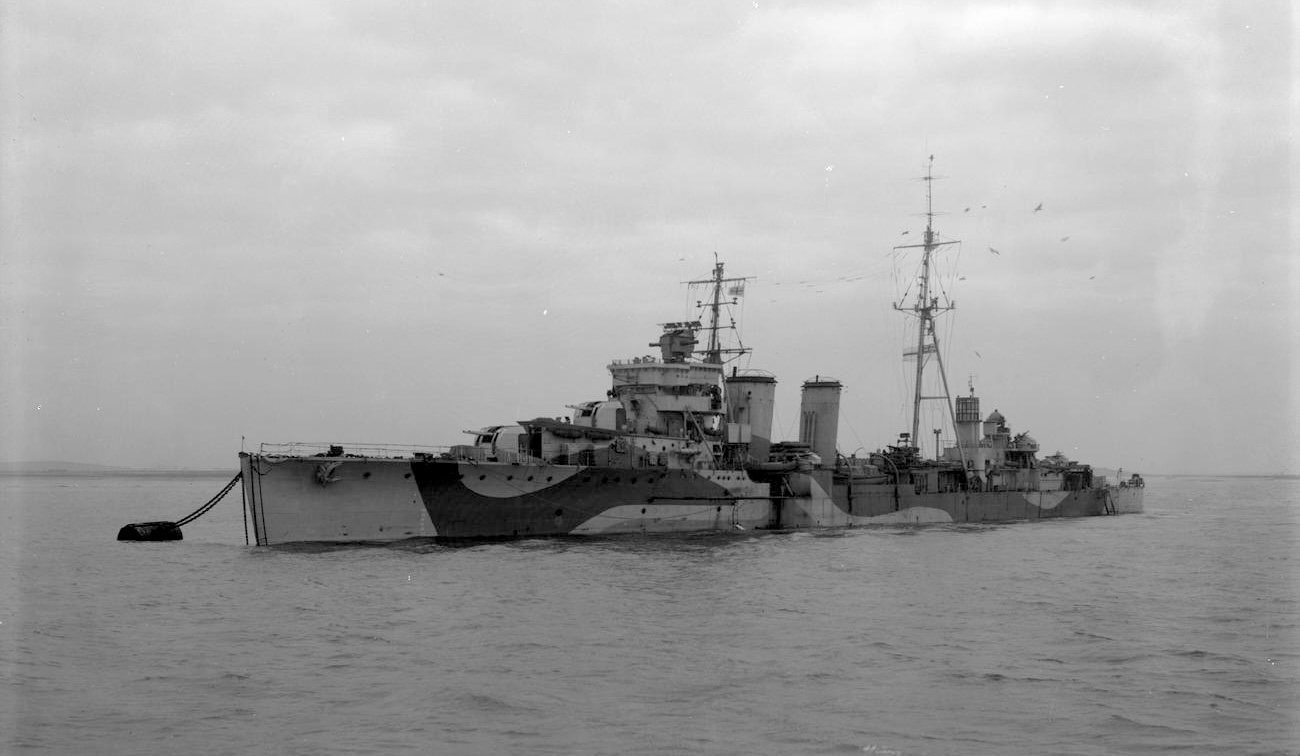

History

United Kingdom
- Name: Caledon
- Builder: Cammell Laird
- Laid down: 17 March 1916
- Launched: 25 November 1916
- Commissioned: 6 March 1917
- Decommissioned: April 1945
- Refit: Converted to anti-aircraft cruiser at Chatham Dockyard 1942–1943
- Identification: Pennant number: 69 (Apr 17); 22 (Jan 18); 65 (Apr 18); 53 (Nov 19); I53 (1936); D53(1940).
- Fate: Sold for scrap, 22 January 1948

General characteristics (as built)
- Class & type: C-class light cruiser
- Displacement: 4,238 long tons (4,306 t)
- Length: 450 ft (137.2 m) (o/a)
- Beam: 42 ft 3 in (12.9 m)
- Draught: 18 ft 9 in (5.72 m) (mean, deep load)
- Installed power: 6 × Yarrow boilers; 40,000 shp (30,000 kW)
- Propulsion: 2 × shafts; 2 × geared steam turbines
- Speed: 29 knots (54 km/h; 33 mph)
- Complement: 438
- Armament: 5 × single 6 in (152 mm) guns; 2 × single 3 in (76 mm) AA guns; 4 × twin 21 in (533 mm) torpedo tubes
- Armour: Waterline belt: 1.25–3 in (32–76 mm); Deck: 1 in (25 mm); Conning tower: 6 in

General characteristics (October 1944)
- Displacement: 5,240 long tons (5,320 t) (full load)
- Armament: 3 × twin 4 in (102 mm) AA guns; 2 × twin and 6 × single 40 mm (1.6 in) AA guns; 1 × single 20 mm (0.8 in) AA gun

HMS Caledon was a C-class light cruiser built for the Royal Navy during World War I. She was the name ship of the Caledon sub-class of the C class. She survived both world wars to be scrapped in 1948.

== Design and description ==
The Caledon sub-class was a slightly larger and improved version of the preceding Centaur sub-class with a more powerful armament. The ships were 450 feet 6 inches (137.3 m) long overall, with a beam of 42 feet 3 inches (12.9 m) and a deep draught of 18 feet 9 inches (5.7 m). Displacement was 4,238 long tons (4,306 t) at normal and 4,911 long tons (4,990 t) at deep load. Caledon was powered by two Parsons steam turbines, each driving one propeller shaft, which produced a total of 40,000 shaft horsepower (30,000 kW). The turbines used steam generated by six Yarrow boilers which gave her a speed of about 29 knots (54 km/h; 33 mph). She carried 935 long tons (950 t) tons of fuel oil. The ship had a crew of about 400 officers and ratings; this increased to 437 when serving as a flagship.

The main armament of the Caledon-class ships consisted of five BL 6-inch (152 mm) Mk XII guns that were mounted on the centreline. One gun was forward of the bridge, two were fore and aft of the two funnels and the last two were in the stern, with one gun superfiring over the rearmost gun. The two QF 3-inch (76 mm) 20-cwt (Note: "Cwt" is the abbreviation for hundredweight, 20 cwt referring to the weight of the gun.) anti-aircraft guns were positioned abreast of the fore funnel. The torpedo armament of the Caledons was four times more powerful than that of the Centaurs, with eight 21 in (533 mm) torpedo tubes in four twin mounts, two on each broadside.

Caledon was converted at the end of 1943 to an anti-aircraft cruiser, replacing the entire former armament with three QF 4-inch (102 mm) Mk XVI twin and two Bofors 40-millimetre (1.6 in) Mk IV "Hazemeyer" twin mounts. By 1944 this was supplemented by six Bofors 40 mm Mk III and one Oerlikon 20-millimetre (0.8 in) Mk III in single mounts. The ship's tonnage increased to 5,240 long tons (5,320 t) at full load, including 200 tons of lead ballast.

== Construction and career ==
She was laid down by Cammell Laird on 17 March 1916, launched on 25 November 1916 and commissioned into the Navy on 6 March 1917. Caledon, commanded by Commodore Walter Cowan, saw action in the Second Battle of Heligoland Bight, where the ship was the leader of the First Light Cruiser Squadron. During the battle, British light cruisers, including Caledon, supported by the First Battlecruiser Squadron, attempted to cut off and destroy a force of German minesweepers escorted by light cruisers. The engagement developed into a chase with the German ships retreating behind smoke screens. The pursuit broke off when the British cruisers came under fire from the German battleships Kaiser and Kaiserin, which were deployed as a distant covering force for the German minesweeping operation. Caledon was hit by a single 305-millimetre (12.0 in) shell from one of the German battleships which failed to explode, and did no damage. Throughout the battle, five men of Caledon's crew were killed, with one man, John Henry Carless being awarded a posthumous Victoria Cross for remaining at his gun after receiving a fatal wound. Caledon survived the First World War.

Caledon took part in the British naval intervention in the Baltic in 1919, serving as Rear Admiral Cowan's flagship for a force of two cruisers (Caledon and Royalist and five destroyers that sailed for the Baltic in January 1919. Caledon shelled Soviet forces at Ventspils during February, helping Latvians to retake the town, before being returning to the United Kingdom later that month, with British naval forces in the Baltic being relieved every six weeks. Caledon returned to the Baltic, again as Cowan's flagship, in April 1919, but was relieved by Curacoa in May. Caledon returned again in July.

The ship spent the early part of the Second World War with the Home Fleet, where she escorted convoys and was involved in the pursuit of the German battleships Scharnhorst and Gneisenau after the sinking of HMS Rawalpindi. She was reassigned to the Eastern Fleet between August 1940 and September 1942. Caledon then rejoined the Home Fleet. Upon her arrival in the UK, she underwent conversion into an anti-aircraft cruiser at Chatham Dockyard between 14 September 1942 and 7 December 1943, replacing the entire armament with modern AA weaponry. Obsolete by the end of the war, she was disarmed in April 1945, and subsequently sold for scrap on 22 January 1948. Caledon arrived at the yards of Dover Industries, Dover, on 14 February 1948 to be broken up.

== Bibliography ==
- Bennett, Geoffrey (2002). Freeing The Baltic. Birlinn. ISBN 1-84341-001-X.
- Campbell, N.J.M. (1980). "Great Britain". In Chesneau, Roger (ed.). Conway's All the World's Fighting Ships 1922–1946. Mayflower Books. pp. 2–85. ISBN 0-8317-0303-2.
- Colledge, J. J.; Warlow, Ben & Bush, Steve (2020). Ships of the Royal Navy: The Complete Record of all Fighting Ships of the Royal Navy from the 15th Century to the Present (5th revised and updated ed.). Seaforth Publishing. ISBN 978-1-5267-9327-0.
- Friedman, Norman (2010). British Cruisers: Two World Wars and After. Seaforth Publishing. ISBN 978-1-59114-078-8.
- Friedman, Norman (2011). Naval Weapons of World War One: Guns, Torpedoes, Mines and ASW Weapons of All Nations; An Illustrated Directory. Seaforth Publishing. ISBN 978-1-84832-100-7.
- Lenton, H. T. (1998). British & Empire Warships of the Second World War. Naval Institute Press. ISBN 1-55750-048-7.
- Newbolt, Henry (1996) [1931]. Naval Operations. History of the Great War Based on Official Documents. Vol. V. Battery Press. ISBN 0-89839-255-1.
- Raven, Alan & Roberts, John (1980). British Cruisers of World War Two. Naval Institute Press. ISBN 0-87021-922-7.
- Preston, Antony (1985). "Great Britain and Empire Forces". In Gray, Randal (ed.). Conway's All the World's Fighting Ships 1906–1921. Naval Institute Press. pp. 1–104. ISBN 0-85177-245-5.
- Rohwer, Jürgen (2005). Chronology of the War at Sea 1939–1945: The Naval History of World War Two (Third Revised ed.). Naval Institute Press. ISBN 1-59114-119-2.
- Whitley, M. J. (1995). Cruisers of World War Two: An International Encyclopedia. Cassell. ISBN 1-86019-874-0.
