= HMS Wolfhound =

Destroyer of the Royal Navy

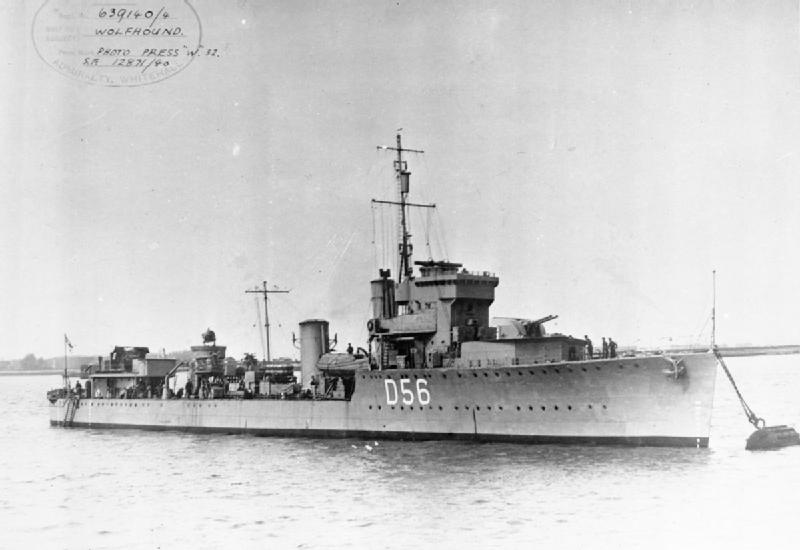
- Wolfhound moored, 1940

History

United Kingdom
- Name: Wolfhound
- Ordered: 9 December 1916
- Builder: Fairfield Shipbuilding and Engineering Company, Govan, Scotland
- Yard number: 535
- Laid down: April 1917
- Launched: 14 March 1918
- Commissioned: 27 April 1918
- Reclassified: As escort destroyer, May 1940
- Motto: 'In at the death'
- Honours and awards: Dunkirk 1940; North Sea 1943–45
- Fate: Sold for scrap, 18 February 1948
- Badge: On a Field Black, a wolfhound's head, Silver, collared Gold.

General characteristics (as built)
- Class & type: W-class destroyer
- Displacement: 1,325 long tons (1,346 t) (normal)
- Length: 312 ft (95.1 m) o/a
- Beam: 29 ft 6 in (9 m)
- Draught: 10 ft 8 in (3.3 m)
- Installed power: 3 × Yarrow boilers; 27,000 shp (20,000 kW)
- Propulsion: 2 Shafts; 1 steam turbine
- Speed: 34 knots (63 km/h; 39 mph)
- Range: 4,150 nmi (7,690 km; 4,780 mi) at 15 knots (28 km/h; 17 mph)
- Complement: 104
- Armament: 4 × single 4 in (102 mm) guns; 1 × single 3 in (76 mm) AA gun; 2 × triple 21 in (533 mm) torpedo tubes

HMS Wolfhound was one of 21 W-class destroyers built for the Royal Navy during the First World War. Completed in 1918 the ship only played a minor role in the war before its end. The ship was converted into an anti-aircraft escort destroyer during the Second World War and was badly damaged during the Dunkirk evacuation. Wolfhound survived the war and was sold for scrap in 1948.

== Description ==
The W class was a repeat of the preceding V-class armed with triple torpedo tube mounts. The ships had an overall length of 312 feet (95.1 m), a beam of 29 feet 8 inches (9 m) and a normaldraught of 10 feet 8 inches (3 m). They displaced 1,325 long tons (1,346 t) at normal load. The ships' complement was 104 officers and ratings.

The ships were powered by a single Brown-Curtis geared steam turbine that drove two propeller shafts using steam provided by three Yarrow boilers. The turbines developed a total of 27,000 shaft horsepower (20,000 kW) and gave a maximum speed of 34 knots (63 km/h; 39 mph). The ships carried enough fuel oil to give them a range of 4,150 nautical miles (7,690 km; 4,780 mi) at 15 knots (28 km/h; 17 mph).

The W-class ships were armed with four single QF 4-inch (102 mm) Mk V guns protected by gun shields. The guns were arranged in two superfiring pairs, one each fore and aft of the superstructure. They were equipped with a single QF 3-inch (76 mm) anti-aircraft gun on a platform abaft of the aft funnel. They were also fitted with two rotating triple mounts for 21-inch (533 mm) torpedoes amidships.

== Construction and career ==
Wolfhound, the first ship of her name to serve in the Royal Navy, was ordered on 9 December 1916 as part of the Tenth War Programme from Fairfield Shipbuilding & Engineering Company. The ship was laid down at the company's Govan shipyard in April 1917, launched on 14 March 1918 and commissioned on 27 April.

=== First World War and inter-war period ===
Wolfhound was commissioned too late to see much active service in the First World War. She was assigned to the 13th Destroyer Flotilla with the Grand Fleet in May, 1918, and later dispatched to the Baltic Sea. It was there Wolfhound saw service in the British campaign in the Baltic (1918–1919) as a part of a taskforce operating against the Bolshevik Red fleet in the Russian Civil War and the Baltic Wars of Independence. Among her operations included providing training, supply, and bombardment support for the Estonian and Latvian provisional governments throughout the fall and winter of 1918. Afterwards HMS Wolfhound was reassigned to the 2nd Destroyer Flotilla in March 1919. Whilst serving with the Sixth Destroyer Flotillas of the Atlantic Fleet in January 1930, Wolfhound was one of seven V- and W-class destroyers damaged in a storm.

=== Second World War ===
After the Second World War began in September 1939 she was one of the old V and W class ships to be selected to be converted to an anti-aircraft ("Wair") escort destroyer, As the Allied forces retreated, Wolfhound was one of the ships detached to support the evacuation of troops from France, and on 25 May she and her sister HMS Wolsey bombarded advancing German units near Calais. The following day Wolfhound ferried a shore party to Dunkirk to coordinate the evacuation; on her return voyage to Dover she loaded 142 troops. On 29 May she was badly damaged at Dunkirk by German bombers, having her back broken. After lengthy repairs she returned to service. After VE Day she was detached to support the re-occupation of Norway. On 14 May she and Wolsey were deployed with Norwegian corvettes to cover minesweeping operations prior to the re-occupation of Bergen.

Wolfhound was transferred to BISCO on 18 February 1948 and was towed to the River Forth later that year to be broken up by Granton Shipbreakers.

== Bibliography ==
- Campbell, John (1985). Naval Weapons of World War II. Annapolis, Maryland: Naval Institute Press. ISBN 0-87021-459-4.
- Chesneau, Roger, ed. (1980). Conway's All the World's Fighting Ships 1922–1946. Greenwich, UK: Conway Maritime Press. ISBN 0-85177-146-7.
- Colledge, J. J.; Warlow, Ben (2006) [1969]. Ships of the Royal Navy: The Complete Record of All Fighting Ships of the Royal Navy from the 15th Century to the Present (3rd Rev ed.). London: Chatham Publishing. ISBN 978-1-86176-281-8. OCLC 67375475.
- Cocker, Maurice. Destroyers of the Royal Navy, 1893–1981. Ian Allan. ISBN 0-7110-1075-7.
- Friedman, Norman (2009). British Destroyers From Earliest Days to the Second World War. Annapolis, Maryland: Naval Institute Press. ISBN 978-1-59114-081-8.
- Gardiner, Robert & Gray, Randal, eds. (1985). Conway's All the World's Fighting Ships 1906–1921. Annapolis, Maryland: Naval Institute Press. ISBN 0-85177-245-5.
- Lenton, H. T. (1998). British & Empire Warships of the Second World War. Annapolis, Maryland: Naval Institute Press. ISBN 1-55750-048-7.
- March, Edgar J. (1966). British Destroyers: A History of Development, 1892–1953; Drawn by Admiralty Permission From Official Records & Returns, Ships' Covers & Building Plans. London: Seeley Service. OCLC 164893555.
- Preston, Antony (1971). 'V & W' Class Destroyers 1917–1945. London: Macdonald. OCLC 464542895.
- Raven, Alan & Roberts, John (1979). 'V' and 'W' Class Destroyers. Man o'War. Vol. 2. London: Arms & Armour. ISBN 0-85368-233-X.
- Rohwer, Jürgen (2005). Chronology of the War at Sea 1939–1945: The Naval History of World War Two (Third Revised ed.). Annapolis, Maryland: Naval Institute Press. ISBN 1-59114-119-2.
- Whinney, Bob (2000). The U-boat Peril: A Fight for Survival. Cassell. ISBN 0-304-35132-6.
- Whitley, M. J. (1988). Destroyers of World War 2. Annapolis, Maryland: Naval Institute Press. ISBN 0-87021-326-1.
- Winser, John de D. (1999). B.E.F. Ships Before, At and After Dunkirk. Gravesend, Kent: World Ship Society. ISBN 0-905617-91-6.
