= List of shipwrecks in July 1940 =

The list of shipwrecks in 1940 includes ships sunk, foundered, grounded, or otherwise lost during July 1940.

== 1 July ==
For the loss of Avelona Star on this day, see the entry for 30 June 1940

List of shipwrecks: 1 July 1940
Ship	State	Description
Adamastos	Greece	World War II: The Design 1018 cargo ship (7,466 GRT) was stopped in the Atlantic Ocean (46°20′N 14°30′W) by U-29 (Kriegsmarine) and sunk by gunfire after her 25 crew abandonned her. All survived.
Beignon	United Kingdom	World War II: Convoy SL 36: The cargo ship was torpedoed and sunk in the Bay of Biscay (47°20′N 10°30′W) by U-30 (Kriegsmarine) with the loss of three of her 33 crew and three survivors from Avelona Star (United Kingdom). Survivors were rescued by HMS Vesper and HMS Windsor (both Royal Navy).
Clearton	United Kingdom	World War II: Convoy SL 36: The cargo ship was torpedoed and sunk in the Bay of Biscay west of Ouessant, Finistère, France (47°53′N 9°30′W) by U-102 (Kriegsmarine) with the loss of eight of her 34 crew. Survivors were rescued by HMS Vansittart (Royal Navy).
Tweedledee	United Kingdom	World War II: The special service vessel was sunk as a blockship.
Tweedledum	United Kingdom	World War II: The special service vessel was sunk as a blockship.
U-102	Kriegsmarine	World War II: The Type VIIB submarine (741/843 t, 1940) was depth charged and sunk in the Atlantic Ocean south west of Ireland (48°33′N 10°26′W) by HMS Vansittart (Royal Navy) with the loss of all 43 crew.

== 2 July ==
List of shipwrecks: 2 July 1940
Ship	State	Description
Aeneas	United Kingdom	World War II: Convoy OA 172G: The ocean liner was bombed and damaged in the English Channel 20 nautical miles (37 km) south east of Start Point, Devon by Luftwaffe aircraft with the loss of 21 of the 143 people on board. Survivors were rescued by HMS Witherington (Royal Navy). The wreck was scuttled two days later at approximately 50°N 3°W. Aeneas was on a voyage from London to Glasgow, Renfrewshire.
Arandora Star	United Kingdom	World War II: The prisoner of war ship was torpedoed and sunk in the Atlantic Ocean north west of Ireland (55°20′N 10°33′W) by U-47 (Kriegsmarine) with the loss of 592 Germans and Italians (prisoners of war or civilian internees, depending on source) 92 troops, and 57 crewmen. The survivors, 586 Germans and Italians, 162 troops and 119 crew, were rescued by HMCS St. Laurent (Royal Canadian Navy).
Athellaird	United Kingdom	World War II: The tanker was torpedoed and damaged in the Atlantic Ocean (47°24′N 16°49′W) by U-29 (Kriegsmarine). Athellaird sank the next day. Her 42 crew took to their two lifeboats. Sandwic (United Kingdom) rescued 22 from the first lifeboat, a day later. After nine days the twenty men in second lifeboat were rescued by Moyalla (Ireland) and were landed at Fenit, County Kerry.
S-23	Kriegsmarine	World War II: The torpedo boat struck a mine and was damaged in the North Sea east of South Foreland, Kent, United Kingdom. She was taken in tow but subsequently sank. (Look 12/07/1940)
Santa Margarita	Panama	World War II: The cargo ship was shelled and sunk in the Atlantic Ocean north west of Cape Finisterre, Spain (47°00′N 15°30′W) by U-29 (Kriegsmarine) with the loss of three of her 39 crew. Twenty-one crew were rescued by King John (United Kingdom), but three of them were lost when King John was sunk. Santa Margarita was on a voyage from Barry, Glamorgan, United Kingdom to the Hampton Roads, Virginia, United States.
U-26	Kriegsmarine	World War II: The Type IA submarine sank after being depth charged and damaged in the Atlantic Ocean off the Bishop Rock (48°03′N 11°30′W) the previous day by a Short Sunderland of 10 Squadron, Royal Australian Air Force and the corvette HMS Gladiolus (Royal Navy). All 48 crew were rescued by the sloop HMS Rochester (Royal Navy).

== 3 July ==
List of shipwrecks: 3 July 1940
Ship	State	Description
Algonquin	United States	The passenger ship caught fire and sank at New York. She was refloated in 1940, repaired, and returned to service in 1942.
Bijou	United Kingdom	World War II: The steam barge was bombed and sunk by Luftwaffe aircraft in the River Stour at Mistley, Essex. Her crew were rescued.
Bretagne	French Navy	Bretagne World War II: Operation Catapult: The Bretagne-class battleship was shelled and sunk at Mers-el-Kébir, Algeria by the Royal Navy with the loss of 977 of her 1,012 crew.
Cygnus	Norway	World War II: The cargo ship (1,334 GRT, 1921) was torpedoed and sunk off Egersund (58°18′N 5°13′E) by HMS Snapper (Royal Navy).
Dunkerque	French Navy	World War II: Operation Catapult: The Dunkerque-class battleship was shelled and damaged at Mers-el-Kébir by the Royal Navy with the loss of 46 of her crew. She was later salvaged and placed under repair.
James 83	United Kingdom	World War II: The special services ship (397 GRT, 1926) was sunk as a blockship.
Mistral	French Navy	World War II: Operation Catapult: The Bourrasque-class destroyer was partially scuttled at Plymouth Dockyard, Devon. Later salvaged by the British and entered service as HMS Mistral.
Mogador	French Navy	Mogador World War II: Operation Catapult: The Mogador-class destroyer was shelled and disabled by the Royal Navy at Mers-el-Kébir with the loss of 18 of her crew. She was later repaired and returned to service.
Notre Dame de Lourdes VP 3	French Navy	The auxiliary harbor patrol ship was lost on this date.
Provence	French Navy	World War II: Operation Catapult: The Bretagne-class battleship was shelled and damaged by the Royal Navy at Mers-el-Kébir with the loss of three of her crew. She was beached to prevent her sinking. Subsequently repaired and returned to service.

== 4 July ==
List of shipwrecks: 4 July 1940
Ship	State	Description
Alice	United States	The 23-gross register ton fishing and cargo vessel was destroyed by fire at St. Ivan Harbor (55°20′N 161°38′W) in Pavlof Bay on the south coast of the Alaska Peninsula in the Territory of Alaska. Her crew of six survived.
Britsum	Netherlands	World War II: Convoy OA 178: The cargo ship was bombed and damaged in the English Channel off Selsey Bill, Sussex, United Kingdom (50°04′N 1°55′W) by Junkers Ju 87 aircraft of Sturzkampfgeschwader 2, Luftwaffe. She was beached (54°40′04″N 0°47′06″W and was subsequently used as a target ship by the Royal Air Force.
Coquet Mouth	United Kingdom	World War II: The dredger struck a mine and sank in the North Sea off Amble, Northumberland with the loss of three of her crew.
Dallas City	United Kingdom	World War II: Convoy OA 178: The cargo ship was bombed and damaged in the English Channel south of Dorset (50°09′N 2°01′W) by Junkers Ju 87 aircraft of Sturzkampfgeschwader 2, Luftwaffe. She collided with Flimston (United Kingdom) and sank. Her crew were rescued by HMS Shikari (Royal Navy).
Deucalion	Netherlands	World War II: Convoy OA 178: The cargo ship was bombed and sunk in the English Channel 20 nautical miles (37 km) south south west of Portland Bill, Dorset (50°11′N 2°35′W) by Junkers Ju 87 aircraft of Sturzkampfgeschwader 2, Luftwaffe. Twenty-seven crew survived.
Elmcrest	United Kingdom	World War II: Convoy OA 178: The cargo ship was torpedoed and sunk in the English Channel 13 nautical miles (24 km) south of Portland Bill by S-19 (Kriegsmarine) with the loss of sixteen crew. Survivors were rescued by HMS Sabre (Royal Navy).
Hartlepool	United Kingdom	World War II: The cargo ship was torpedoed and sunk 16 nautical miles (30 km) off Portland Bill, by S-20 and S-26 (both Kriegsmarine). Survivors were rescued by HMS Scimitar (Royal Navy).
Kolga	Estonia	World War II: Convoy OA 178: The cargo ship was bombed and sunk in the English Channel south of the Isle of Portland, Dorset (50°13′N 2°00′W) by Junkers Ju 87 aircraft of Sturzkampfgeschwader 2, Luftwaffe with the loss of one of her 30 crew.
Remembrance	United Kingdom	World War II: The fishing vessel struck a mine and sank in the English Channel (51°53′N 1°22′E). Both crew were rescued.
Rigault de Genouilly	French Navy	World War II: Operation Catapult: The Bougainville-class aviso was torpedoed and sunk in the Mediterranean Sea north of Matifou, Algeria by HMS Pandora (Royal Navy)
Silverdial	United Kingdom	World War II: The tug was bombed and sunk in Portland Harbour by Junkers Ju 87 aircraft of Sturzkampfgeschwader 2, Luftwaffe.

== 5 July ==
List of shipwrecks: 5 July 1940
Ship	State	Description
HMS Foylebank	Royal Navy	World War II: Convoy OA 178: The anti-aircraft ship sank with the loss of 176 of her 323 crew after being bombed and damaged the previous day at Portland Harbour, Dorset, by Junkers Ju 87 dive bombers of Stukageschwader 2, Luftwaffe. The bow section was raised and scrapped in 1949. The stern section was raised and scrapped in 1952.
Liguria	Regia Marina	World War II: The troopship was torpedoed and damaged in the Mediterranean Sea at Tobruk, Libya by Fairey Swordfish aircraft of 813 Squadron, Fleet Air Arm, based on HMS Eagle (Royal Navy). She was beached to prevent her sinking and was lost there when Tobruk fell in January 1941.
Magog	Canada	World War II: Convoy HX 53: The cargo ship straggled behind the convoy. She was torpedoed, shelled, and split in two in the Atlantic Ocean 58 nautical miles (107 km) west south west of the Fastnet Rock by U-99 (Kriegsmarine). The stern section sank. All 23 crew survived and were rescued by Sidra (Sweden). The bow section sank three days later at 50°32′N 11°20′W.
Manzoni	Italy	World War II: The cargo ship was sunk by torpedo in the Mediterranean Sea at Tobruk by a Fairey Swordfish aircraft of 813 Squadron, Fleet Air Arm, based on HMS Eagle (Royal Navy). She was later salvaged by the British.
Serenitas	Italy	World War II: The cargo ship was torpedoed and damaged in the Mediterranean Sea at Tobruk by Fairey Swordfish aircraft of 813 Squadron, Fleet Air Arm, based on HMS Eagle (Royal Navy), was beached and was lost there when Tobruk fell in January 1941. She was salvaged by the British in 1951 and scrapped.
HMS Whirlwind	Royal Navy	World War II: The W-class destroyer was torpedoed and severely damaged in the Atlantic Ocean south west of Ireland (50°17′N 8°48′W) by U-34 (Kriegsmarine) with the loss of 57 crew. Survivors were rescued by HMS Westcott (Royal Navy), which scuttled the ship with gunfire.
Zeffiro	Regia Marina	World War II: The Turbine-class destroyer was torpedoed and sunk in the Mediterranean Sea at Tobruk by Fairey Swordfish aircraft of 813 Squadron, Fleet Air Arm from HMS Eagle (Royal Navy) with the loss of 21 of her crew.

== 6 July ==
List of shipwrecks: 6 July 1940
Ship	State	Description
Angele Mabro	Egypt	World War II: The cargo ship was torpedoed and sunk in the Bay of Biscay west south west of Brest, Finistère, France by U-30 (Kriegsmarine) with the loss of all hands.
Axum	Italy	World War II: The cargo ship was shelled and sunk at Bardia, Libya by HMS Caledon, HMS Capetown, HMS Ilex, HMS Imperial, HMS Janus and HMS Juno (all (Royal Navy).
P-17 Cap Fagnet	French Navy	World War II: Operation Lever: The auxiliary patrol vessel was sunk at Mers-el-Kébir, Algeria by British aircraft .
Dunkerque	French Navy	World War II: Operation Lever: The Dunkerque-class battleship was torpedoed at Mers-el-Kébir by aircraft based on HMS Ark Royal (Royal Navy) and sunk by the explosion of Terre Neuve (French Navy) with the loss of 154 crew. She was subsequently refloated, towed to Toulon, Var, France and placed under repair.
Esterel V	French Navy	World War II: Operation Lever: The auxiliary minesweeper was torpedoed and sunk at Mers-el-Kébir by aircraft of 810 Squadron, Fleet Air Arm, based on HMS Ark Royal (Royal Navy).
Sant' Antonio	Italy	World War II: The auxiliary schooner was shelled and sunk at Bardia by HMS Caledon, HMS Capetown, HMS Ilex, HMS Imperial, HMS Janus and HMS Juno (all Royal Navy).
HMS Shark	Royal Navy	World War II: The S-class submarine sank while under tow by the minesweepers M-1803, M-1806, and M-1807 (all Kriegsmarine), after being bombed and damaged the previous day west-southwest of Egersund, Norway, by Dornier Do 17 aircraft of the Luftwaffe and surrendering to German forces.
Terre Neuve	French Navy	World War II: Operation Lever: The auxiliary patrol boat was torpedoed by aircraft of 810 Squadron, Fleet Air Arm, based on HMS Ark Royal (Royal Navy) and sunk by the detonation of her depth charges while tied up alongside Dunkerque, at Mers-el-Kébir, with the loss of eight crew.
Vapper	Estonia	World War II: The cargo ship was torpedoed and sunk in the Atlantic Ocean south west of Land's End, Cornwall, United Kingdom (49°30′N 9°15′W) by U-34 (Kriegsmarine) with the loss of one of her 34 crew. Survivors were rescued by HMCS Restigouche (Royal Canadian Navy).
UJ-D Treff VIII	Kriegsmarine	World War II: The submarine chaser struck a mine laid by HMS Narwhal (Royal Navy) on 4 July and sank in the Norwegian Sea off the coast of Norway (63°15′N 7°39′E). Of a crew of 35, thirteen were killed or reported missing.

== 7 July ==
List of shipwrecks: 7 July 1940
Ship	State	Description
Bissen	Sweden	World War II: The cargo ship was torpedoed and sunk in the Atlantic Ocean 80 nautical miles (150 km) west of Cape Clear Island, County Cork, Ireland (50°06′N 10°23′W) by U-99 (Kriegsmarine). All twenty crew were rescued by a Royal Navy destroyer.
Delambre	United Kingdom	World War II: The cargo ship (7,032 GRT) was shelled, stopped and then scuttled in the South Atlantic (6°13′S 25°06′W) by Thor (Kriegsmarine). All aboard (44 crew and 1 passenger) were taken prisoners.
Lucrecia	Netherlands	World War II: The tanker was torpedoed and sunk in the Atlantic Ocean south west of Land's End, Cornwall, United Kingdom (49°50′N 8°07′W) by U-34 (Kriegsmarine) with the loss of two of her 30 crew. Survivors were rescued by Alferrarede (Portugal).
Sea Glory	United Kingdom	World War II: The cargo ship (1,964 GRT) was torpedoed and sunk in the Atlantic Ocean 110 nautical miles (200 km) south-southwest of the Fastnet Rock (49°39′N 10°25′W) by U-99 (Kriegsmarine) with the loss of all 29 crew. She was on a voyage from Fowey, Cornwall to Philadelphia, Pennsylvania, United States.

== 8 July ==
List of shipwrecks: 8 July 1940
Ship	State	Description
HMT Cayton Wyke	Royal Navy	World War II: The naval trawler was torpedoed and sunk in the English Channel south east of Dover, Kent by S-36 (Kriegsmarine) with the loss of all eighteen crew.
HMS Escort	Royal Navy	World War II: The E-class destroyer was torpedoed and damaged in the Mediterranean Sea east of Gibraltar by Guglielmo Marconi (Regia Marina) with the loss of two of her 145 crew. An attempt was made to tow her to Gibraltar, but she foundered on 11 July.
Humber Arm	United Kingdom	World War II: Convoy HX 53: The cargo ship was torpedoed and sunk in the Celtic Sea 60 nautical miles (110 km) south of the Fastnet Rock (50°36′N 9°24′W by U-99 (Kriegsmarine). All 43 crew were rescued by Scimitar and HMS Vanquisher (both Royal Navy).
James 9	United Kingdom	World War II: The special services ship was sunk as a blockship.
Suippe	French Navy	World War II: The sloop was bombed and damaged at Falmouth, Cornwall, United Kingdom by Luftwaffe aircraft and was beached to prevent her sinking.

== 9 July ==
List of shipwrecks: 9 July 1940
Ship	State	Description
Aylesbury	United Kingdom	World War II: The cargo ship was torpedoed and sunk in the Atlantic Ocean (48°39′N 13°33′W) by U-43 (Kriegsmarine). All 35 crew were rescued by HMS Harvester and HMS Havelock (both Royal Navy).
Bruges	Belgium	World War II: The cargo ship (4,984 GRT) was shelled and sunk in the South Atlantic (4°S 28°W) by Thor (Kriegsmarine). Her 44 crew were all taken as prisoners of war.
Empire Daffodil	United Kingdom	The cargo ship was bombed and damaged in the English Channel south west of the Isle of Wight by Luftwaffe aircraft. She was subsequently repaired and returned to service.
HMS Foxglove	Royal Navy	World War II: The Acacia-class sloop was bombed and severely damaged in the English Channel off the Isle of Wight by Luftwaffe aircraft. She was consequently withdrawn from front-line service and converted to an accommodation ship.
HMS Salmon	Royal Navy	World War II: The S-class submarine struck a mine and sank off Egersund, Norway (57°22′N 5°00′E) with the loss of all 39 crew.
Tālvaldis	Latvia	World War II: Convoy CW 2: The cargo ship was bombed and sunk in the English Channel south of Start Point, Devon, United Kingdom by Luftwaffe aircraft with the loss of a crew member.
Tiiu	Estonia	World War II: The cargo ship was torpedoed and sunk in the Atlantic Ocean west of Cornwall, United Kingdom (50°20′N 12°00′W) by U-34 (Kriegsmarine). Her crew were rescued by a British fishing trawler.

== 10 July ==
List of shipwrecks: 10 July 1940
Ship	State	Description
Alwaki	Netherlands	World War II: Convoy OA 180: The cargo ship was torpedoed and sank in the North Sea 10 nautical miles (19 km) off Cape Wrath, Sutherland, United Kingdom (58°46′N 4°46′W) by U-61 (Kriegsmarine). All eight crew were rescued by Harmonic (United Kingdom).
Bill S.	Netherlands	World War II: Convoy CW 3: The coaster was bombed and sunk in the English Channel off Dungeness, Kent by Luftwaffe aircraft. Her crew were rescued.
British Chancellor	United Kingdom	World War II: The tanker as damaged by Luftwaffe aircraft at Falmouth, Cornwall.
Cheik	France	World War II: The cargo ship was torpedoed and sunk by Scirè (Regia Marina) 54 nautical miles (100 km) off "Semaphore d'Asmare".
HMS Corfu	Royal Navy	The armed merchant cruiser collided with HMS Hermes (Royal Navy) in the Atlantic Ocean and was damaged and abandoned. She was later re-boarded and subsequently taken in tow by HMS Milford (Royal Navy) and the tug Donau (Netherlands) and reached Freetown, Sierra Leone on 13 July. She was beached on 19 August for repairs to her bow and re-entered service in early 1941.
Davisian	United Kingdom	World War II: The cargo ship was shelled, torpedoed and sank in the Caribbean Sea 450 nautical miles (830 km) north of Guadeloupe (18°09′N 54°40′W) by Widder (Kriegsmarine). Her crew were taken as prisoners of war.
Hellenic Skipper	Greece	The passenger shipcaught fire. She sank on 13 July off Astoria, Washington, United States.
Leone Pancaldo	Regia Marina	World War II: The Navigatori-class destroyer was torpedoed and sank off Augusta, Sicily, by Fairey Swordfish aircraft of 813 Squadron, Fleet Air Arm, based on HMS Eagle (Royal Navy). She was later salvaged, repaired and returned to service.
Mari Chandris	Greece	World War II: The cargo ship was bombed by Luftwaffe aircraft at Falmouth. Her cargo of raw cotton caught alight and she was later towed to a small bay near St Mawes and sunk by gunfire. Her 37 crew survived. She was later re-floated and beached at Place, where some of her cargo was salvaged, and she was cut up for scrap.
Petsamo	Finland	World War II: The cargo liner was torpedoed and sank in the Celtic Sea south of County Cork, Ireland (51°08′N 9°22′W) by U-34 (Kriegsmarine) with the loss of four of her 38 crew.
Tascalusa	United Kingdom	World War II: The cargo ship (6,499 GRT) was bombed by Luftwaffe aircraft and sank at Falmouth, Cornwall. She was refloated on 29 August and beached at St Just, but declared a constructive total loss. Her superstructure was cut, and she wastowed to Freeman's yard, Penryn in November.
Waterloo	Canada	World War II: The cargo ship was bombed and sank in the North Sea off Winterton-on-Sea, Norfolk, United Kingdom by Luftwaffe aircraft.

== 11 July ==
List of shipwrecks: 11 July 1940
Ship	State	Description
Beme	Panama	World War II: The tanker (3,309 GRT) was shelled, torpedoed and sunk in the Mediterranean Sea off Haifa, Palestine (33°12′N 33°38′E) by Capitano Tarantini (Regia Marina) on a voyage from Haifa to Istanbul, Turkey. Her whole crew abandonned her after the first shells and were rescued.
City of Baghdad	United Kingdom	World War II: The cargo ship was shelled and sunk in the Indian Ocean (0°14′N 86°34′E) by Atlantis (Kriegsmarine) with the loss of two of her 83 crew. Survivors were taken as prisoners of war.
HMS Escort	Royal Navy	World War II: The E-class destroyer foundered after being torpedoed and damaged in the Mediterranean Sea east of Gibraltar by Guglielmo Marconi (Regia Marina) on 8 July 1940 with the loss of two of her 145 crew.
Janna	Norway	World War II: Convoy HX 54: The cargo ship straggled behind the convoy. She was torpedoed and sunk in the Atlantic Ocean south west of Ireland (50°34′N 12°10′W) by U-34 (Kriegsmarine). All 25 crew were rescued.
Mallard	United Kingdom	World War II: The tugboat was torpedoed and sunk in the English Channel south of Bognor Regis, Sussex (50°23′38″N 2°19′11″W) by S 26 (Kriegsmarine) with the loss of six of her nine crew. Survivors were rescued by S 26 and taken as prisoners of war.
Providentia	Belgium	World War II: The fishing vessel was bombed and sunk in the Atlantic Ocean (49°55′N 9°12′W) by Luftwaffe aircraft.
Sance	United States	The seiner sank five minutes after she was nearly cut in half in a collision in heavy fog with the cannery tender Spencer (United States) in Wrangell Narrows in the Alexander Archipelago, Alaska Territory. Spencer rescued her crew.
HMS Warrior	Royal Navy	World War II: The anti-submarine yacht was bombed and sunk in the English Channel off the Portland, Dorset by Luftwaffe aircraft with the loss of a crew member.

== 12 July ==
List of shipwrecks: 12 July 1940
Ship	State	Description
Hornchurch	United Kingdom	World War II: The cargo ship was bombed and sunk in the North Sea off the Aldeburgh Lightship ( Trinity House) (52°11′15″N 1°52′30″E) by Luftwaffe aircraft. Her crew were rescued by HMS Widgeon (Royal Navy).
Ia	Greece	World War II: The cargo ship was torpedoed and sunk in the Atlantic Ocean southwest of Ireland (51°N 14°W) by U-99 (Kriegsmarine) with the loss of three of her 30 crew.
S-23	Kriegsmarine	World War II: The Type 1937 schnellboot was sunk by a mine.
Volante	United Kingdom	World War II: The fishing trawler was bombed and sunk in the Atlantic Ocean off Hvalba, Faroe Islands by Luftwaffe aircraft with the loss of a crew member.

== 13 July ==
List of shipwrecks: 13 July 1940
Ship	State	Description
Emerald Wings	United Kingdom	World War II: The Admiralty-requisitioned cargo ship was scuttled as a blockship in Skerry Sound, Scapa Flow.
Kemmendine	United Kingdom	World War II: The ocean liner was shelled and sunk in the Indian Ocean (4°12′S 81°47′E) by Atlantis (Kriegsmarine). Fifty-seven crew and 23 passengers were taken as prisoners of war. Thirty of them were lost when Tirrana (Kriegsmarine) was sunk on 21 September.
King John	United Kingdom	World War II: The cargo ship was intercepted in the South Atlantic (20°40′N 59°26′W) by Widder (Kriegsmarine) and scuttled. Her 33 crew survived; five of them were taken as prisoners of war.

== 14 July ==
List of shipwrecks: 14 July 1940
Ship	State	Description
Gracefield	United Kingdom	World War II: The cargo ship (4,631 GRT) was stopped, shelled and sunk in the Caribbean Sea off Trinidad (20°20′S 30°43′W) by Thor (Kriegsmarine). Her 36 crew were all taken as prisoners of war.
Island Queen	United Kingdom	World War II: Convoy CW 5: The coaster was bombed and damaged in the English Channel off the Folkestone Gateway Lightship ( Trinity House ). Island Queen was taken in tow by HMT Kingston Alalite (Royal Navy) but sank with the loss of three crew.
Providentia	Belgium	World War II: The fishing trawler was bombed and sunk in St George's Channel (49°55′N 9°12′W) with the loss of all hands.
Raven	United States	The 12 GRT, 39.6-foot (12.1 m) fishing vessel was destroyed by fire while moored at a cannery dock at Hoonah, Territory of Alaska. The only person aboard survived.
Sarita	Norway	World War II: The tanker was torpedoed and sunk in the Atlantic Ocean off Cape Verde, Portugal (15°22′N 26°28′W) by UA (Kriegsmarine). Survivors were rescued by Dunstan (United Kingdom).
Thetis A.	Greece	World War II: The cargo ship was torpedoed and sunk in the Atlantic Ocean west south west of the Isles of Scilly (47°40′N 13°20′W) by U-52 (Kriegsmarine) with the loss of nine of her 29 crew.

== 15 July ==
List of shipwrecks: 15 July 1940
Ship	State	Description
Alpha	Portugal	World War II: The coaster (824 GRT) was bombed and sunk in the Atlantic Ocean south west of Cornwall, United Kingdom (48°51′N 6°43′W) by Luftwaffe aircraft. Her 21 crew all survived and were rescued by a French fishing boat.
Bellerock	United Kingdom	World War II: The cargo ship(1,199 GRT) struck a mine in the Bristol Channel (51°20′N 3°47′W) and sank with the loss of seventeen of her crew.
City of Limerick	Ireland	World War II: The cargo liner was bombed and sunk in the Atlantic Ocean 100 nautical miles (190 km) due west of Ouessant, Finistère, France (48°39′N 7°12′W) by Luftwaffe aircraft with the loss of two of her crew. Survivors were rescued by the fishing trawler Roger Jeannine (Belgium).
Draugen	Norway	World War II: The tug struck a mine and sank in the Norwegian Sea off Salhus with the loss of six of her ten crew.
Evdoxia	Greece	World War II: The cargo ship was torpedoed and sunk in the Atlantic Ocean 40 nautical miles (74 km) south west of the Bull Rock, Ireland by U-34 (Kriegsmarine) with the loss of one of her 23 crew.
Frossoula	Panama	World War II: The cargo ship was sunk by bombing in the Atlantic Ocean 240 nautical miles (440 km) north west of Cape Finisterre, Spain, by Luftwaffe aircraft. Only three of her 36 crew survived.
Heworth	United Kingdom	World War II: Convoy FN 223: The cargo ship was bombed and damaged in the North Sea 10 nautical miles (19 km) south of the Aldeburgh Lightship ( Trinity House) with the loss of four of her crew. She was taken in tow but later sank. Survivors were rescued by HMS Valorous (Royal Navy).
Merisaar1900	Estonia	World War II: The cargo ship had been captured on 12 July by U-99 (Kriegsmarine) and was ordered to sail to a French port. She was accidentally bombed and sunk off Queenstown, County Cork, Ireland (51°N 14°W) by Luftwaffe aircraft. Her crew survived.
Naftilos	Greece	World War II: The cargo ship was shelled and sunk in the Bay of Biscay (48°05′N 10°25′W) by U-34 (Kriegsmarine) with the loss of one of her 28 crew.
Pacific President	United Kingdom	World War II: Convoy FN 223: The cargo ship ran aground on Inchkeith, Fife.
Zbaraz	Poland	World War II: Convoy FN 223: The cargo ship was bombed and sunk in the North Sea 10 nautical miles (19 km) south of the Aldeburgh Lightship ( Trinity House ). She was taken in tow by St Olaves (United Kingdom) but sank. Her crew were rescued by Muria and the fishing trawler Vidonia (both United Kingdom).

== 16 July ==
List of shipwrecks: 16 July 1940
Ship	State	Description
Jason	Germany	World War II: The transport ship struck a mine and sank in the Baltic Sea off Dragør, Denmark.
HMS Imogen	Royal Navy	The I-class destroyer was rammed and sunk in the North Sea off Duncansby Head, Caithness (58°34′N 2°54′W) by HMS Glasgow (Royal Navy) with the loss of nineteen of her 154 crew.
Pei Fu	China	The cargo ship ran aground at Tsunoshima, Honshū, Japan and was wrecked.
HMS Phoenix	Royal Navy	World War II: The Parthian-class submarine was torpedoed and sunk off Augusta, Sicily, Italy by Albatros (Regia Marina) with the loss of all 53 crew.
Scottish Minstrel	United Kingdom	World War II: Convoy HX 55: The tanker was torpedoed and damaged in the Atlantic Ocean north west of County Donegal, Ireland (56°10′N 10°20′W) by U-61 (Kriegsmarine) with the loss of nine of her 41 crew. Survivors were rescued by Fiscus (United Kingdom). Scottish Minstrel was on a voyage from New York, United States to London. She sank the next day.
Wendover	United Kingdom	World War II: The cargo ship was shelled and sunk in the South Atlantic (23°08′S 34°49′W) by Thor (Kriegsmarine) with the loss of four of her 41 crew. Survivors were rescued by Thor and made prisoners of war.

== 17 July ==
List of shipwrecks: 17 July 1940
Ship	State	Description
Clan Macfarlane	United Kingdom	The cargo ship collided with Ganges (United Kingdom) and sank in the Indian Ocean off Socotra, Aden with the loss of 41 of her crew.
Fellside	United Kingdom	World War II: Convoy OA 184: The cargo ship straggled behind the convoy. She was torpedoed and sunk in the Atlantic Ocean 135 nautical miles (250 km) north west of Bloody Foreland, County Donegal, Ireland (56°09′N 12°30′W) by U-43 (Kriegsmarine) with the loss of twelve of her 33 crew.
Leola	Estonia	World War II: The cargo ship was bombed and sunk in the Atlantic Ocean 60 nautical miles (110 km) west of the Isles of Scilly, United Kingdom (49°00′N 7°30′W) by Luftwaffe aircraft with the loss of two of her crew. Survivors were rescued by the fishing trawler Roger Jeannine (Belgium).
Manipur	United Kingdom	World War II: Convoy HX 55A: The cargo ship was torpedoed and sunk in the North Sea off Cape Wrath, Sutherland (58°41′N 5°14′W) by U-57 (Kriegsmarine) with the loss of fourteen of her 79 crew. Survivors were rescued by HMCS Skeena (Royal Canadian Navy).
O. A. Brodin	Sweden	World War II: The cargo ship was torpedoed and sunk in the Atlantic Ocean west of the Orkney Islands (59°22′N 3°40′W) by U-57 (Kriegsmarine) with the loss of three of her 24 crew. Survivors were rescued by HMT Sicyon (Royal Navy).
HMDYC Steady	Royal Navy	World War II: The Trinculo-class mooring vessel struck a mine and sank in the English Channel off Newhaven, Sussex. There were thirteen survivors. The wreck was sold for scrapping. It was raised and removed in October 1942.
Wiiri	Finland	World War II: The cargo ship was bombed and sunk in the Mediterranean Sea 30 nautical miles (56 km) off Malta by Regia Aeronautica aircraft. Her 26 crew were rescued.

== 18 July ==
List of shipwrecks: 18 July 1940
Ship	State	Description
Gyda	Norway	World War II: The cargo ship was torpedoed and sunk in the Atlantic Ocean (55°50′N 9°00′W) by U-58 (Kriegsmarine) with the loss of eleven of her twenty crew. Survivors were rescued by SS Ville d'Arlon (Belgium).
Sigurd Hund	Norway	The coaster ran aground on Jæren. Cargo was offloaded and she was refloated the next day. She was taken in tow, but capsized and sank.
UJ-126 Steiermark	Kriegsmarine	World War II: The submarine chaser was torpedoed and sunk in the North Sea north of Terschelling, Friesland, Netherlands (53°29′N 5°03′E) by HMS H31 (Royal Navy). Nine of her 46 crew were killed.
Woodbury	United Kingdom	World War II: The cargo ship was torpedoed and sunk in the Atlantic Ocean (50°46′N 13°56′W) by U-99 (Kriegsmarine). Her 35 crew survived.

== 19 July ==
List of shipwrecks: 19 July 1940
Ship	State	Description
Bartolomeo Colleoni	Regia Marina	World War II: Battle of Cape Spada: The Condottieri-class cruiser was shelled and immobilized in the Mediterranean Sea off Cape Spada, Crete, Greece by HMAS Sydney (Royal Australian Navy). She was then torpedoed and sunk by HMS Hyperion and HMS Ilex (both Royal Navy) with the loss of 121 crew. Five hundred and fifty-five crew were rescued by HMS Hyperion and HMS Ilex and made prisoners of war.
HMT Crestflower	Royal Navy	World War II: The naval trawler was bombed and sunk in the English Channel south of the Isle of Wight (50°29′06″N 1°17′08″W) by Luftwaffe aircraft with the loss of two of her crew.
Pearlmoor	United Kingdom	World War II: Convoy SL 38: The cargo ship straggled behind the convoy. She was torpedoed and sunk in the Atlantic Ocean west of County Donegal, Ireland (55°23′N 9°18′W) by U-62 (Kriegsmarine) with the loss of thirteen of her 39 crew.
Tela	Netherlands	World War II: The cargo ship was shelled and sunk in the South Atlantic (14°S 33°W) by Thor (Kriegsmarine). Her 33 crew were rescued and made prisoners of war.
RFA War Sepoy	Royal Fleet Auxiliary	World War II: The fleet oiler was bombed and severely damaged at Dover, Kent by Luftwaffe aircraft. She broke in two, and was subsequently used as a blockship.

== 20 July ==
List of shipwrecks: 20 July 1940
Ship	State	Description
Nembo	Regia Marina	World War II: The Turbine-class destroyer was torpedoed and sunk in the Gulf of Bomba, off Tobruk, Libya by Fairey Swordfish aircraft of 813 Squadron, Fleet Air Arm, based on HMS Eagle (Royal Navy).
Ostro	Regia Marina	World War II: The Turbine-class destroyer was torpedoed and sunk in the Gulf of Bomba, off Tobruk by Fairey Swordfish aircraft of 813 Squadron, Fleet Air Arm, based on HMS Eagle (Royal Navy).
Palma	United Kingdom	World War II: The cargo ship was shelled and damaged in the Atlantic Ocean south west of Iceland (50°14′N 17°53′W) by U-95 (Kriegsmarine). She was subsequently repaired and returned to service.
Sereno	Italy	World War II: The cargo ship was torpedoed and sunk in the Gulf of Bomba, off Tobruk by Fairey Swordfish aircraft of 813 Squadron, Fleet Air Arm, based on HMS Eagle (Royal Navy).
Pulborough	United Kingdom	World War II: Convoy CW 7: The cargo ship was bombed and sunk in the English Channel off Dover, Kent by Luftwaffe aircraft. Seventeen survivors were rescued by the fishing trawler Lady Pulborough United Kingdom).
Troutpool	United Kingdom	World War II: The cargo ship struck a mine and sank in Belfast Lough (54°40′N 5°40′W) with the loss of eleven of her 32 crew.

== 21 July ==
List of shipwrecks: 21 July 1940
Ship	State	Description
HMS Brazen	Royal Navy	World War II: Convoy CW 7: After being bombed and damaged in the English Channel off Dover, Kent, England, by Luftwaffe aircraft with the loss of one of her 138 crew the previous day, the B-class destroyer broke in two and sank at 51°01′05″N 1°17′15″E while under tow by Lady Brassey (United Kingdom).
Ellaroy	United Kingdom	World War II: The cargo ship was torpedoed and sunk in the Atlantic Ocean (42°30′N 12°36′W by U-30 (Kriegsmarine). All sixteen crew were rescued by the fishing trawler Felix Montenegro (Spain).
Terlings	United Kingdom	World War II: The cargo ship was bombed and sunk in the English Channel 10 nautical miles (19 km) south west of St Catherine's Point, Isle of Wight by Dornier Do 17 and Messerschmitt Bf 110 aircraft of the Luftwaffe with the loss of ten crew of her 28 crew. Survivors were rescued by HMS Scimitar (Royal Navy).

== 22 July ==
List of shipwrecks: 22 July 1940
Ship	State	Description
HMT Campina	Royal Navy	World War II: The naval trawler struck a mine in the Irish Sea off Holyhead, Anglesey, and sank with the loss of all eleven crew.
Silver Wave	United States	The 20 GRT, 41.4-foot (12.6 m) fishing vessel was destroyed by fire at the cannery dock at Wrangell, Territory of Alaska. Her six crew survived.

== 23 July ==
List of shipwrecks: 23 July 1940
Ship	State	Description
HMS Narwhal	Royal Navy	World War II: The Grampus-class submarine was bombed and sunk in the Norwegian Sea (63°16′N 7°13′E) by a Dornier Do 17 aircraft of Küstenfliegergruppe 606, Luftwaffe with the loss of all 59 crew.
The Lady Mostyn	United Kingdom	World War II: The coaster struck a mine and sank in Liverpool Bay off the Formby Lightship ( Trinity House) with the loss of all hands.

== 24 July ==
List of shipwrecks: 24 July 1940
Ship	State	Description
Celio	Italy	World War II: The passenger ship struck a mine and sank in the Mediterranean Sea east of Tolmeita, Libya (32°39′N 21°03′E).
HMT Fleming	Royal Navy	World War II: The naval trawler was bombed and sunk in the Thames Estuary east of Essex by Luftwaffe aircraft with the loss of nineteen of her 22 crew. Survivors were rescued by HMT Corena (Royal Navy).
Kem	Norway	World War II: The cargo ship struck a mine and sank in the Norwegian Sea north of Svåholmen (58°21′N 6°01′E). There were no casualties.
HMT Kingston Galena	Royal Navy	World War II: The naval trawler was bombed and sunk in the English Channel off Dover, Kent with the loss of eighteen of her crew.
Meknés	French Navy	World War II: The troopship was torpedoed and sunk in the English Channel (50°04′10″N 2°14′30″W) by S-27 (Kriegsmarine) with the loss of 416 of the 1,381 people on board. Survivors were rescued by HMS Sabre, HMS Shikari, HMS Viscount and HMS Wolverine (all Royal Navy).
HMT Rodino	Royal Navy	The naval trawler sank in the English Channel off Dover with the loss of three of her crew.
Trio	Finland	World War II: The cargo ship struck a mine and sank in the Wadden Sea off Borkum, Lower Saxony, Germany. Her crew were rescued.

== 25 July ==
List of shipwrecks: 25 July 1940
Ship	State	Description
Corhaven	United Kingdom	World War II: Convoy CW 8: The coaster was bombed and sunk in the English Channel off Dover, Kent by Junkers Ju 87 aircraft of I Gruppe, Sturzkampfgeschwader 1 and IV Gruppe, Lehrgeschwader 1, Luftwaffe. Her crew were rescued.
Henry Moon	United Kingdom	World War II: Convoy CW 8: The cargo ship was bombed and sunk in the English Channel off Folkestone, Kent by Junkers Ju 87 aircraft of I Gruppe, Sturzkampfgeschwader 1 and IV Gruppe, Lehrgeschwader 1, Luftwaffe with the loss of one of her crew.
Leo	United Kingdom	World War II: Convoy CW 8: The cargo ship was bombed and sunk in the English Channel off Dover by Junkers Ju 87 aircraft of I Gruppe, Sturzkampfgeschwader 1 and IV Gruppe, Lehrgeschwader 1, Luftwaffe with the loss of six of her crew.
Polgrange	United Kingdom	World War II: Convoy CW 8: The cargo ship was bombed and sunk in the English Channel off Dover by Junkers Ju 87 aircraft of I Gruppe, Sturzkampfgeschwader 1 and IV Gruppe, Lehrgeschwader 1, Luftwaffe with the loss of two of her crew.
Portslade	United Kingdom	World War II: Convoy CW 8: The collier was bombed and sunk in the English Channel off New Romney, Kent by Junkers Ju 87 aircraft of I Gruppe, Sturzkampfgeschwader 1 and IV Gruppe, Lehrgeschwader 1, Luftwaffe. Her crew were rescued.

== 26 July ==
List of shipwrecks: 26 July 1940
Ship	State	Description
Accra	United Kingdom	World War II: Convoy OB 188: The ocean liner was torpedoed and sunk in the Atlantic Ocean 320 nautical miles (590 km) west of Bloody Foreland, County Donegal, Ireland (55°40′N 16°28′W) by U-34 (Kriegsmarine) with the loss of 24 of the 489 people on board. Survivors were rescued by HMS Clarkia, HMS Enchantress (both Royal Navy), Hollinside (United Kingdom) and Loke (Norway).
Balzac	Norway	World War II: The cargo ship struck a mine and sank in the North Sea off Sunderland, County Durham, United Kingdom (54°54′N 1°19′W) with the loss of nine of her twenty crew.
Broadhurst	United Kingdom	World War II: Convoy CW 8: The cargo ship was torpedoed and sunk in the English Channel off Shoreham-by-Sea, Sussex by S-20 (Kriegsmarine) with the loss of four of her crew.
Haytor	United Kingdom	World War II: The cargo ship struck a mine and sank in the North Sea east of Frinton-on-Sea, Essex.
London Trader	United Kingdom	World War II: Convoy CW 8: The cargo ship was torpedoed and sunk in the English Channel south of Worthing, Sussex by S-19 (Kriegsmarine).
Luchs	Kriegsmarine	World War II: The Raubtier-class torpedo boat was torpedoed and sunk in the North Sea off Utsira, Norway (58°30′N 4°30′E) by HMS Thames (Royal Navy). Thirty-four of her crew were killed.
Lulonga	United Kingdom	World War II: The cargo ship was torpedoed and sunk in the English Channel, 10 nautical miles (19 km) south of Shoreham-by-Sea by S-27 (Kriegsmarine).
M-61	Kriegsmarine	World War II: The Type 1916 minesweeper struck a mine and sank in the North Sea off Hook of Holland, South Holland, Netherlands.
M-89	Kriegsmarine	World War II: The Type 1916 minesweeper struck a mine and sank in the North Sea off Hook of Holland.
M-136	Kriegsmarine	World War II: The Type 1916 minesweeper struck a mine and sank in the North Sea off Hook of Holland.
Montan	Germany	World War II: The cargo ship struck a mine and sank in the Wadden Sea off Spiekeroog.
Vinemoor	United Kingdom	World War II: The cargo ship was torpedoed and sunk in the Atlantic Ocean west of the Outer Hebrides (55°43′N 16°25′W) by U-34 (Kriegsmarine). All 32 crew were rescued by HMS Clarkia, HMS Enchantress (both Royal Navy), Hollinside (United Kingdom) and Loke (Norway).

== 27 July ==
List of shipwrecks: 27 July 1940
Ship	State	Description
Charles-Madeleine	Belgium	World War II: The fishing vessel struck a mine and sank.
HMS Codrington	Royal Navy	World War II: The A-class destroyer was bombed and severely damaged at Dover, Kent by Luftwaffe aircraft. She was beached with a broken back and declared a total loss.
Durdham	United Kingdom	World War II: The dredger struck a mine and sank in the Bristol Channel off Cardiff, Glamorgan (51°23′18″N 3°08′48″W) with the loss of eight of her crew.
Salvestria	United Kingdom	World War II: Convoy HX 57: The whale factory ship struck an acoustic mine in the Firth of Forth and sank north east of Inchkeith, Fife (56°04′06″N 3°04′48″W) with the loss of ten of her 57 crew.
Sambre	United Kingdom	World War II: Convoy OB 188: The cargo ship was torpedoed and sunk in the Atlantic Ocean 400 nautical miles (740 km) west north west of Ireland (56°37′N 17°53′W) by U-34 (Kriegsmarine). Her 48 crew were rescued by HMS Winchelsea (Royal Navy).
Thiara	United Kingdom	World War II: Convoy OB 188: The tanker was torpedoed and sunk in the Atlantic Ocean west of the Outer Hebrides (56°37′N 17°56′W) by U-34 (Kriegsmarine) with the loss of 25 of the 61 people on board. Survivors were rescued by HMS Winchelsea (Royal Navy).
HMS Wren	Royal Navy	World War II: The W-class destroyer was bombed and sunk in the North Sea off Aldeburgh, Suffolk (52°10′N 2°06′E) by Luftwaffe aircraft with the loss of 37 of her crew. Survivors were rescued by HMS Halcyon and HMS Montrose (both Royal Navy).

== 28 July ==
List of shipwrecks: 28 July 1940
Ship	State	Description
Argo	Norway	World War II: The coaster struck a mine and sank off Egersund.
Auckland Star	United Kingdom	World War II: The cargo ship was torpedoed and sunk in the Atlantic Ocean west of Cape Clear Island, County Donegal, Ireland (52°17′N 12°32′W) by U-99 (Kriegsmarine). Her 74 crew survived.
Ermioni	Greece	World War II: The cargo ship was intercepted by HMS Neptune (Royal Navy) and HMAS Sydney (Royal Australian Navy) in the Aegean Sea off Kea Island, while taking military supplies to Italy, and was scuttled.
Maski	Norway	World War II: The yacht was scuttled in the North Sea by HMS Swordfish (Royal Navy), which rescued her four crew.
Orlock Head	United Kingdom	World War II: The cargo ship was bombed and sunk in the North Sea (58°44′N 4°21′W) by Luftwaffe aircraft.
HMT Staunton	Royal Navy	World War II: The naval trawler struck a mine and sank in the Thames Estuary east of Bradwell-on-Sea, Essex with the loss of all thirteen crew.

== 29 July ==
List of shipwrecks: 29 July 1940
Ship	State	Description
Clan Menzies	United Kingdom	World War II: The cargo ship was torpedoed and sunk in the Atlantic Ocean west of Ireland (54°10′N 12°00′W) by U-99 (Kriegsmarine) with the loss of six of her 94 crew.
Clan Monroe	United Kingdom	World War II: The cargo ship struck a mine off Harwich, Essex (51°52′N 1°48′E) and was damaged. She was towed to Hollesley Bay, Suffolk and beached. Thirteen of her 79 crew were killed.
Grønland	Denmark	World War II: The cargo ship was bombed and sunk in Dover Harbour, Kent, United Kingdom with the loss of nineteen of her crew.
HMY Gulzar	Royal Navy	World War II: The naval yacht was bombed and sunk at Dover, Kent by Luftwaffe aircraft. Her crew were rescued.
Leach's Romance	United Kingdom	World War II: The fishing vessel struck a mine and sank in the English Channel 10.5 nautical miles (19.4 km) south of Kemp Town, Sussex with the loss of all four crew.
Moidart	United Kingdom	World War II: The cargo ship struck a mine and sank in the North Sea off Felixtowe, Suffolk (51°59′N 1°49′E) with the loss of eleven of her crew.
Ousebridge	United Kingdom	World War II: The cargo ship struck a mine and sank in the River Mersey off Southport, Lancashire with the loss of two of her crew.
Umvoti	United Kingdom	World War II: The cargo ship was scuttled as a blockship at Dover. She was refloated in 1943 and scrapped.

== 30 July ==
List of shipwrecks: 30 July 1940
Ship	State	Description
HMS Delight	Royal Navy	World War II: The D-class destroyer sank in Portland Harbour after being bombed and damaged off Portland, Dorset, in a Luftwaffe'air raid with fourteen killed, four missing, and 56 of her 145 crew wounded.
HMS Lady Slater	Royal Navy	The auxiliary patrol/examination ship caught fire and sank in the Caribbean Sea off Plumb Point Lighthouse, Jamaica.

== 31 July ==
List of shipwrecks: 31 July 1940
Ship	State	Description
Domingo de Larrinaga	United Kingdom	World War II: The cargo ship (5,358 GRT) was shelled and sunk in the South Atlantic (5°27′S 18°21′W) by Pinguin (Kriegsmarine) with the loss of eight of her 38 crew. The 30 survivors were taken as prisoners of war and one died later in a camp in Germany.
Jamaica Progress	United Kingdom	World War II: The cargo ship (5,475 GRT) was torpedoed and sunk in the Atlantic Ocean south west of Barra, Outer Hebrides (56°26′N 8°30′W) by U-99 (Kriegsmarine) with the loss of eight lives (6 crew, 1 gunner and 1 passenger). The 47 survivors were rescued by Gloucester City (United Kingdom).
Jersey City	United Kingdom	World War II: Convoy OB 191: The cargo ship (6,322 GRT) was torpedoed and sunk in the Atlantic Ocean north west of County Donegal, Ireland (55°47′N 9°18′W) by U-99 (Kriegsmarine) with the loss of two of her 45 crew. Survivors were rescued by the fishing trawler Newland (United Kingdom).
Stalheim	Norway	World War II: The cargo ship (1,298 GRT) struck a mine and sank in the Bristol Channel off Port Talbot, Glamorgan, United Kingdom (51°34′37″N 3°49′50″W) with the loss of five of the 21 people on board. Survivors were rescued by a RAF Rescue Launch.

== Unknown date ==
List of shipwrecks: Unknown date 1940
Ship	State	Description
Karsten	Germany	World War II: The coaster was sunk bat Ningpo, China.
HMS LCA 6	Royal Navy	The Landing Craft Assault was lost sometime in July.
