= HNoMS Frøya =

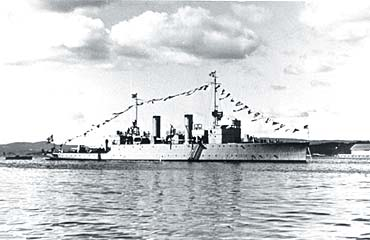
- Frøya prior to World War II

History

Norway
- Name: Frøya
- Namesake: Norse goddess Freyja
- Builder: The Royal Norwegian Navy's shipyard in Horten
- Yard number: 108
- Launched: 20 June 1916
- Commissioned: 1 July 1918
- Out of service: 13 April 1940
- Fate: Scuttled 13 April 1940

General characteristics
- Displacement: 595 tons
- Length: 75.3 m (247.05 ft)
- Beam: 8.2 m (26.90 ft)
- Draft: 2.8 m (9.19 ft)
- Propulsion: 6000 hp, two triple expansion steam engines
- Speed: 22 knots (40.74 km/h)
- Complement: 78 men
- Armament: As built: 4 × 10 cm (4 in) guns; 2 × 46 cm (18.1 in) torpedo tubes; 180 mines; Added later: 1 × 76 mm (3 in) gun

The minelayer HNoMS Frøya was built for the Royal Norwegian Navy by the naval shipyard in Horten during World War I, with yard number 108. A fast ship for her time, she was kept in service until the German invasion of Norway in 1940. At some point between her commissioning and 1940, a 76 mm gun was added to her armaments. Frøya was the first purpose-built minelayer commissioned into the RNoN.

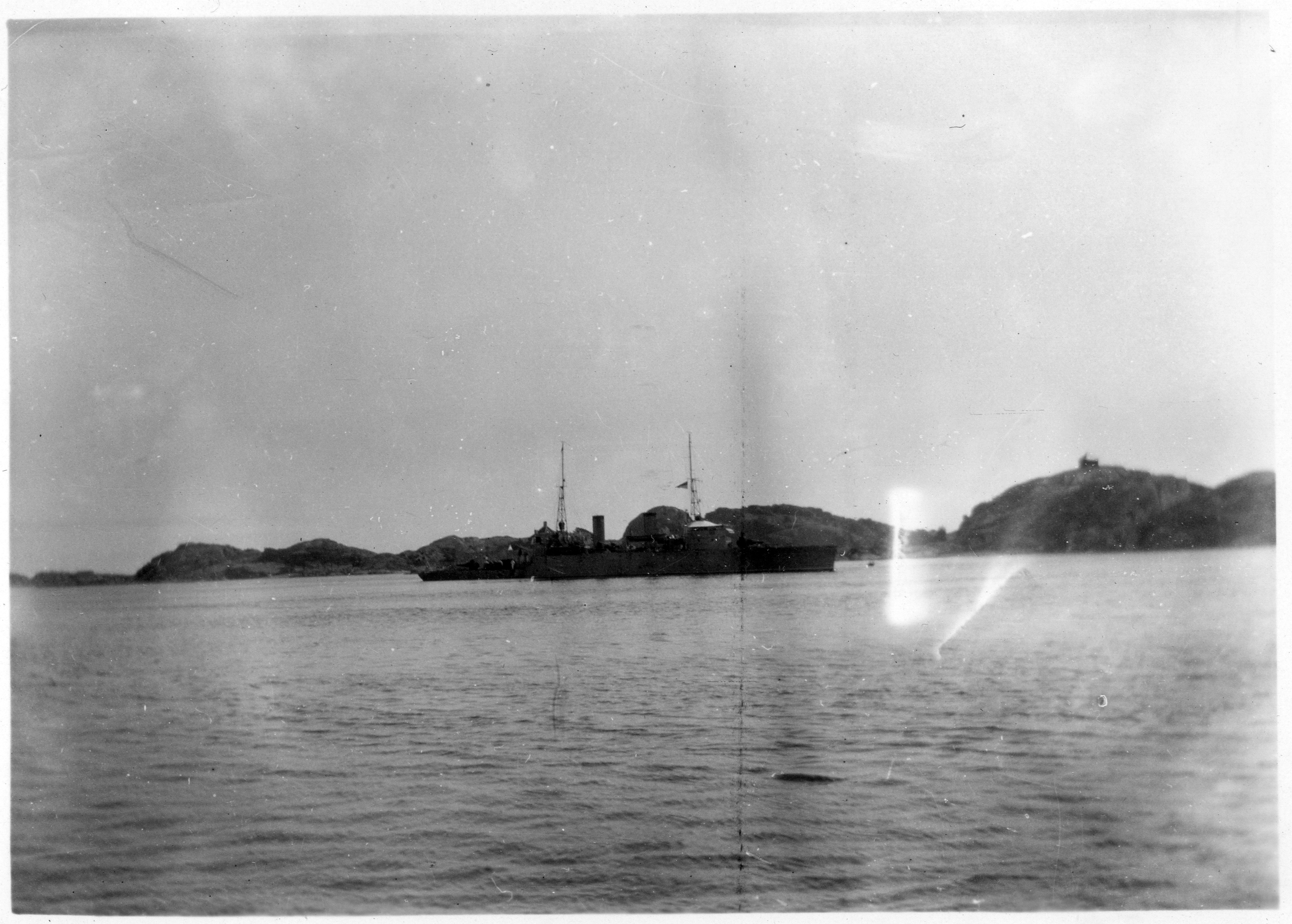
Frøya off Stavern, Norway

== Frøya and the invasion ==
At the time the Germans invaded Norway, Frøya was underway from Finnmark to Horten naval base in the Oslofjord, and on 8 April she anchored at Brekstad harbour at Ørland Municipality at the mouth of the Trondheimsfjord. Due to bad weather Captain T. Schrøder-Nielsen was reluctant to cross Hustadvika bay with the ship's full load of mines and had sought shelter at Brekstad overnight. When, on the morning of 9 April, the German assault came, the crew of the Frøya observed the intruding German warships making their way to Trondheim. Trapped in the fjord, the decision was made to move the minelayer into the nearby Stjørnfjord. In the Stjørnfjord Frøya repeatedly came under attack from both land based artillery and Luftwaffe bombers. On 13 April Captain Schrøder-Nielsen decided all hope was lost and, refusing to let his ship fall into German hands, he ordered her scuttled. After removing some equipment and Frøya's load of mines for possible later use the crew of Frøya rammed their ship at great speed ashore at Søtvika, opened the ship's valves and at 12:30 fired explosive charges, demolishing her. Shortly after being scuttled the wreck of Frøya was discovered by Kapitänleutnant Wilhelm Rollmann of the German submarine U-34. As the U-boat captain believed her still to be salvageable for the Norwegians the submarine torpedoed Frøya, blowing the stern off the already wrecked minelayer.

== The wreck ==
After she was scuttled, it was still possible to explore the wreck. Enough of the ship remains to make Frøya a wreck that is dived to regularly.

== Literature ==
- Abelsen, Frank (1986). Norwegian naval ships 1939-1945 (in Norwegian and English). Oslo: Sem & Stenersen AS. ISBN 82-7046-050-8.
