= German submarine U-102 (1940) =

German World War II submarine

Coordinates: 48°33′N 10°26′W

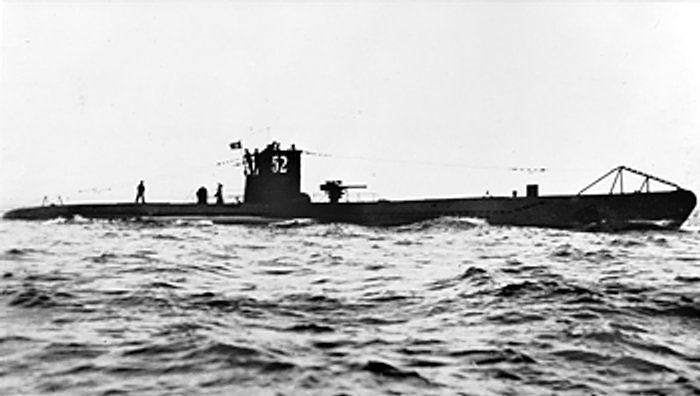
- U-52, a typical Type VIIB boat

History

Nazi Germany
- Name: U-102
- Ordered: 15 December 1937
- Builder: Germaniawerft, Kiel
- Yard number: 596
- Laid down: 22 May 1939
- Launched: 21 March 1940
- Commissioned: 27 April 1940
- Fate: Sunk on 1 July 1940

General characteristics
- Class & type: Type VIIB submarine
- Displacement: 753 tonnes (741 long tons) surfaced; 857 t (843 long tons) submerged
- Length: 66.50 m (218 ft 2 in) o/a; 48.80 m (160 ft 1 in) pressure hull
- Beam: 6.20 m (20 ft 4 in) o/a; 4.70 m (15 ft 5 in) pressure hull
- Height: 9.50 m (31 ft 2 in)
- Draught: 4.74 m (15 ft 7 in)
- Installed power: 2,800–3,200 PS (2,100–2,400 kW; 2,800–3,200 bhp) (diesels); 750 PS (550 kW; 740 shp) (electric)
- Propulsion: 2 shafts; 2 × diesel engines; 2 × electric motors
- Speed: 17.9 knots (33.2 km/h; 20.6 mph) surfaced; 8 knots (15 km/h; 9.2 mph) submerged
- Range: 8,700 nmi (16,100 km; 10,000 mi) at 10 knots (19 km/h; 12 mph) surfaced; 90 nmi (170 km; 100 mi) at 4 knots (7.4 km/h; 4.6 mph) submerged
- Test depth: 220 m (720 ft); Crush depth: 230–250 m (750–820 ft)
- Complement: 4 officers, 40–56 enlisted
- Sensors & processing systems: Gruppenhorchgerät
- Armament: 5 × 53.3 cm (21 in) bow torpedo tubes; 14 × torpedoes or 26 TMA mines; 1 × 8.8 cm (3.5 in) deck gun with 220 rounds; 1 × 2 cm (0.79 in) C/30 anti-aircraft gun

Service record
- Part of: 7th U-boat Flotilla; 27 April – 1 July 1940
- Identification codes: M 13 990
- Commanders: Kptlt. Harro von Klot-Heydenfeldt; 27 April – 1 July 1940
- Operations: 1 patrol: 22 June – 1 July 1940
- Victories: 1 merchant ship sunk (5,219 GRT)

German submarine U-102 was a Type VIIB submarine of Nazi Germany's Kriegsmarine during World War II.

The U-boat was laid down on 22 May 1939 at the Friedrich Krupp Germaniawerft shipyard at Kiel as yard number 596, launched on 21 March 1940 and commissioned on 27 April under the command of Kapitänleutnant Harro von Klot-Heydenfeldt to serve with the 7th U-boat Flotilla from 27 April 1940 to 1 June for crew training and operationally until she was sunk on 1 July. She sank one Allied ship, claiming 5,219 gross register tons (GRT).

== Design ==
German Type VIIB submarines were preceded by the shorter Type VIIA submarines. U-102 had a displacement of 753 tonnes (741 long tons) when at the surface and 857 tonnes (843 long tons) while submerged. She had a total length of 66.50 m (218 ft 2 in), a pressure hull length of 48.80 m (160 ft 1 in), a beam of 6.20 m (20 ft 4 in), a height of 9.50 m (31 ft 2 in), and a draught of 4.74 m (15 ft 7 in). The submarine was powered by two Germaniawerft F46 four-stroke, six-cylinder supercharged diesel engines producing a total of 2,800 to 3,200 metric horsepower (2,060 to 2,350 kW; 2,760 to 3,160 shp) for use while surfaced, two AEG GU 460/8-276 double-acting electric motors producing a total of 750 metric horsepower (550 kW; 740 shp) for use while submerged. She had two shafts and two 1.23 m (4 ft) propellers. The boat was capable of operating at depths of up to 230 metres (750 ft).

The submarine had a maximum surface speed of 17.9 knots (33.2 km/h; 20.6 mph) and a maximum submerged speed of 8 knots (15 km/h; 9.2 mph). When submerged, the boat could operate for 90 nautical miles (170 km; 100 mi) at 4 knots (7.4 km/h; 4.6 mph); when surfaced, she could travel 8,700 nautical miles (16,100 km; 10,000 mi) at 10 knots (19 km/h; 12 mph). U-102 was fitted with five 53.3 cm (21 in) torpedo tubes (four fitted at the bow and one at the stern), fourteen torpedoes, one 8.8 cm (3.46 in) SK C/35 naval gun, 220 rounds, and one 2 cm (0.79 in) anti-aircraft gun. The boat had a complement of between forty-four and sixty.

== Service history ==
U-102's first and only patrol began on 22 June 1940. Having sunk the Clearton about 180 nmi (330 km; 210 mi) west of Ushant (often known as Ouessant, an island in northwest France) on 1 July, she was herself sunk on the same day as the latter ship by depth charges from a British destroyer, HMS Vansittart.

43 men died with the submarine; there were no survivors.

After the U-boat's sinking, Vansittart rescued the 26 survivors from Clearton.

=== Previously Recorded Fate ===
U-102 was originally believed to have been sunk in the Bay of Biscay due to unknown causes on or after 30 June 1940.

== Summary of raiding history ==
Date	Ship	Nationality	Tonnage (GRT)	Fate
1 July 1940	Clearton	United Kingdom	5,219	Sunk

== Bibliography ==
- Busch, Rainer; Röll, Hans-Joachim (1999). German U-boat commanders of World War II : a biographical dictionary. Translated by Brooks, Geoffrey. London, Annapolis, Md: Greenhill Books, Naval Institute Press. ISBN 1-55750-186-6.
- Busch, Rainer; Röll, Hans-Joachim (1999). Deutsche U-Boot-Verluste von September 1939 bis Mai 1945 [German U-boat losses from September 1939 to May 1945]. Der U-Boot-Krieg (in German). Vol. IV. Hamburg, Berlin, Bonn: Mittler. ISBN 3-8132-0514-2.
- Gröner, Erich; Jung, Dieter; Maass, Martin (1991). German Warships 1815–1945, U-boats and Mine Warfare Vessels. Vol. 2. Translated by Thomas, Keith; Magowan, Rachel. London: Conway Maritime Press. ISBN 0-85177-593-4.
