= SS Tiberton =

British cargo steamship

- Tiberton

History

United Kingdom
- Name: Tiberton
- Namesake: Tyberton
- Owner: R Chapman & Son, Ltd
- Port of registry: Newcastle upon Tyne
- Builder: Richardson, Duck & Co, South Stockton & Thornaby
- Yard number: 679
- Launched: 20 January 1920
- Completed: March 1920
- Identification: UK official number 142861; until 1933: code letters KFCV; by 1930: call sign GKVC
- Fate: sunk by torpedo, 19 February 1940

General characteristics
- Class & type: War Standard Type B cargo steamship
- Tonnage: 5,225 GRT, 3,190 NRT
- Length: 400.1 ft (122.0 m)
- Beam: 52.4 ft (16.0 m)
- Depth: 28.4 ft (8.7 m)
- Decks: 2
- Installed power: 1 × triple-expansion engine; 397 NHP
- Propulsion: 1 × screw
- Speed: 11 knots (20 km/h)
- Crew: 34
- Sensors & processing systems: by 1939: wireless direction finding

SS Tiberton was a cargo steamship that was built in England in 1920. She was a War Standard Type B ship, ordered by the UK Shipping Controller. She was completed for R Chapman & Son, Ltd, of Newcastle upon Tyne, who owned her throughout her career. She was lost with all hands in 1940, when a German U-boat torpedoed her in the North Sea.

== Building and registration ==
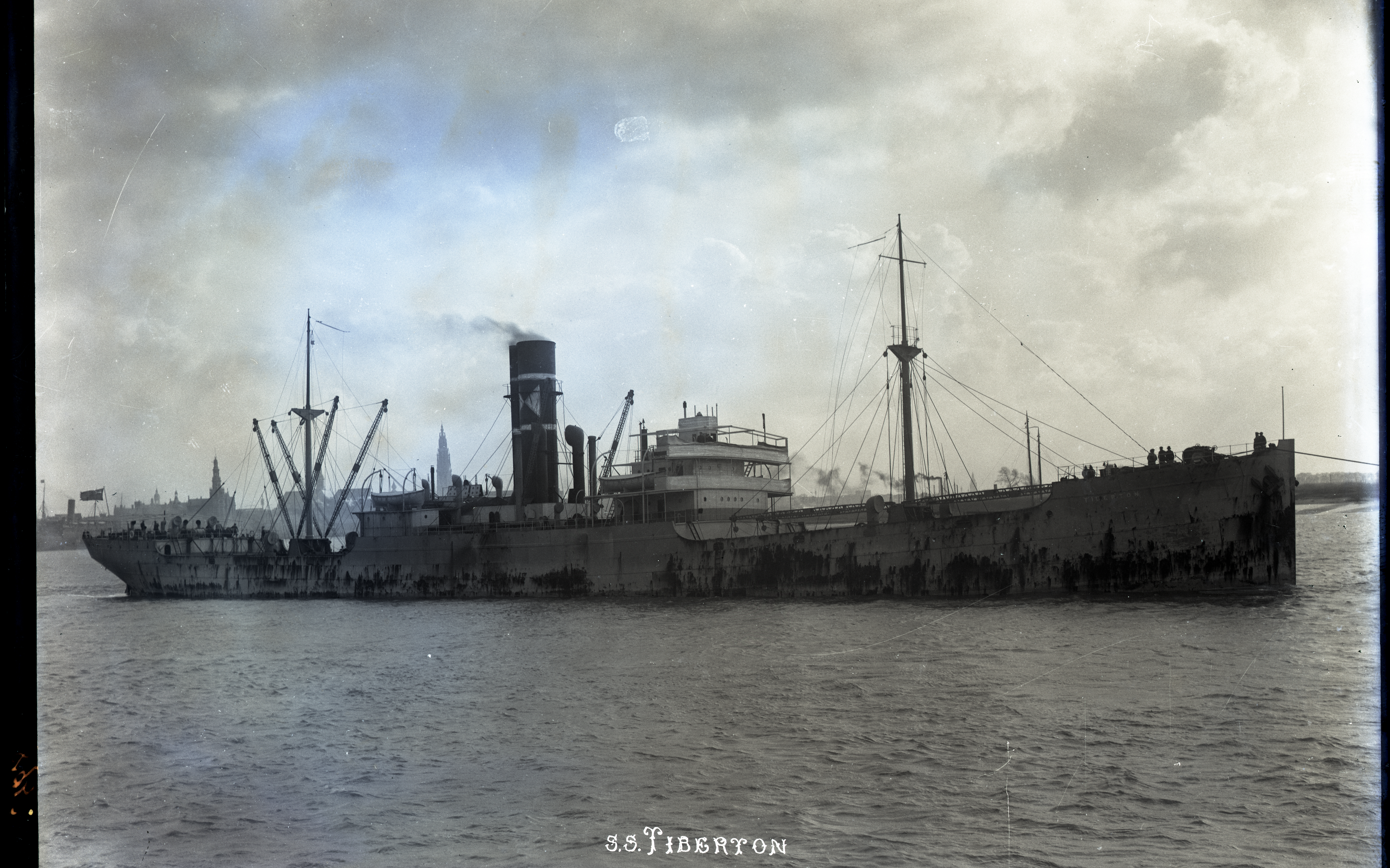

After the First World War, R Chapman & Son acquired several newly-built War Standard cargo ships. They included three Type B's: Innerton (originally War Scilla) and Clearton in 1919, and Tiberton in 1920. All three were built on Teesside: Innerton by Ropner & Sons at Stockton, and Clearton and Tiberton by Richardson, Duck and Company at South Stockton and Thornaby.

Richardson, Duck & Co built Tiberton as yard number 679, launched her on 20 January 1920, and completed her that March. Her registered length was 400.1 ft (122.0 m), her beam was 52.4 ft (16.0 m), and her depth was 28.4 ft (8.7 m). Her tonnages were 5,225 GRT and 3,190 NRT. She had a single screw, driven by a three-cylinder triple-expansion engine built by Blair & Co of Stockton. It was rated at 397 NHP, and gave her a speed of 11 knots (20 km/h). Chapman & Son registered her in Newcastle upon Tyne. Her UK official number was 142861, and her code letters were KFCV.

== Peacetime career ==
On 14 June 1928, Tiberton ran aground at Bahía Blanca in Argentina. She was refloated on 17 June.

By 1930, Tiberton's call sign was GKVC, and by 1934, this had superseded her code letters. By 1939, she was equipped with wireless direction finding.

== Loss ==
On 28 January 1940, Tiberton left Hull and joined Convoy FN 81, which had left the Thames Estuary off Southend-on-Sea the previous day. FN 81 went as far as the River Tyne, beyond which Tiberton continued independently to the Firth of Forth. There she joined Convoy ON 10 off Methil, which left on 5 February, and reached Norwegian waters three days later. Tiberton continued to Narvik, where she loaded iron ore.

Tiberton left Narvik independently on 14 February 1940, bound for Middlesbrough and Immingham. U-23 attacked her on the morning of 19 February, firing one torpedo at her at 04:05 hrs German time. Tiberton broke in two and sank in 30 seconds at position 58°55′00″N 01°53′00″W, German Naval Grid Reference AN 1634, about 33 miles east of Kirkwall, Orkney. There were no survivors.

No distress signal was received from Tiberton. On 10 April 1940, Lloyd's Register recorded her as missing or untraced, and a Joint Arbitration Committee found her to be a "war loss".

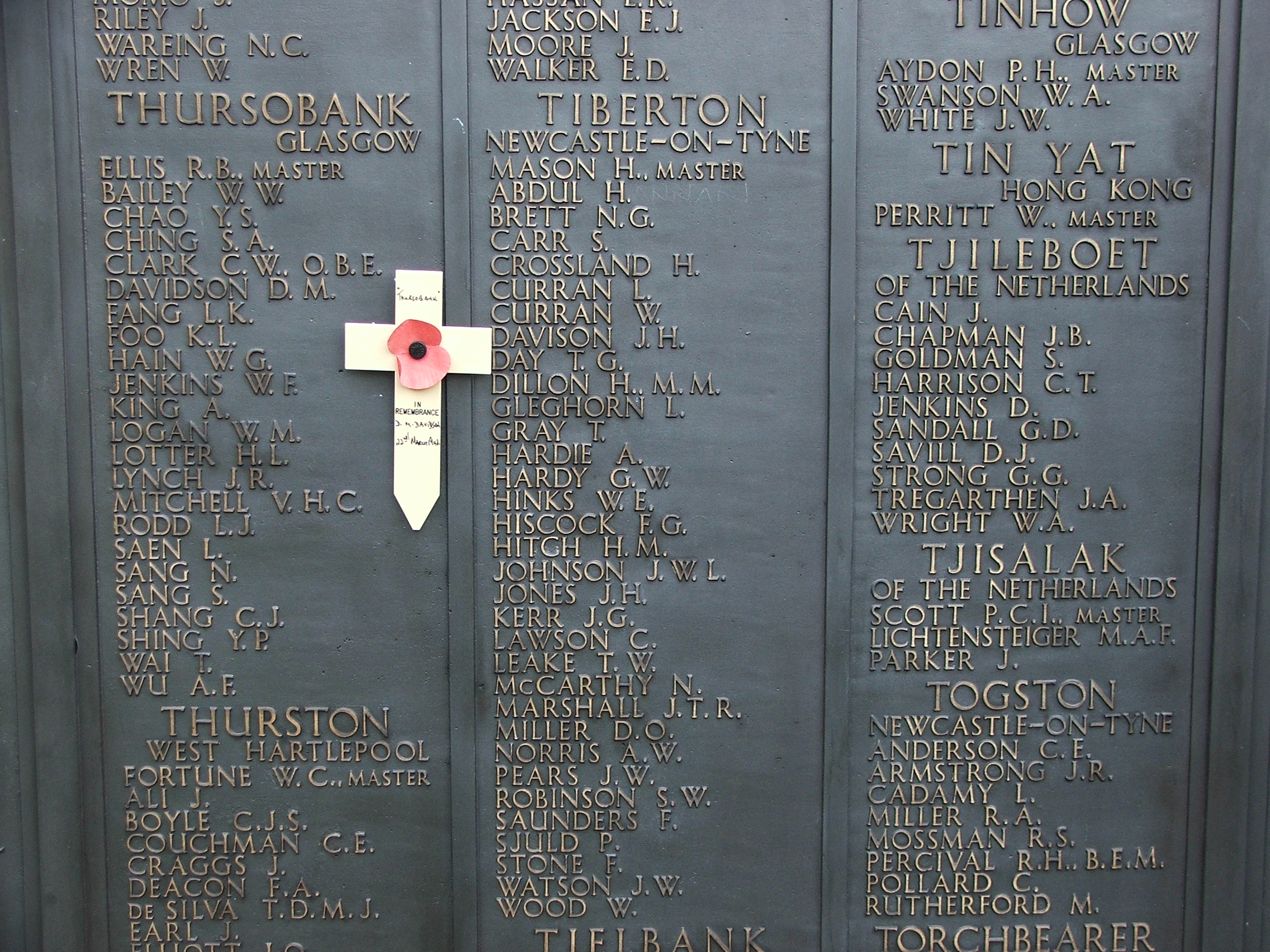
Part of Panel 108 of the Second World War section of Tower Hill Memorial in London, showing the names of men killed aboard Tiberton

== Monuments ==
Tiberton's Master was Captain Hugh Mason. He, and all but one of his crew, are commemorated on Panel 108 of the Second World War part of Tower Hill Memorial in London. The exception is the Third Engineer, Edward Oliver May, who was English, but had emigrated to Canada. He is commemorated on Panel 17 of the Halifax Memorial in Point Pleasant Park in Halifax, Nova Scotia.

== Bibliography ==
- Lloyd's Register of Shipping. Vol. II.–Steamers. London: Lloyd's Register of Shipping. 1920 – via Internet Archive.
- Lloyd's Register of Shipping (PDF). Vol. II.–Steamers and Motorships of 300 Tons Gross and Over. London: Lloyd's Register of Shipping. 1934 – via Southampton City Council.
- Lloyd's Register of Shipping (PDF). Vol. II.–Steamers and Motorships of 300 Tons. Trawlers, Tugs, Dredgers, Etc. London: Lloyd's Register of Shipping. 1939 – via Southampton City Council.
- Registrar General of Shipping and Seamen (1921). Mercantile Navy List. Board of Trade. p. 624 – via Crew List Index Project.
- Registrar General of Shipping and Seamen (1930). Mercantile Navy List. Board of Trade. p. 546 – via Crew List Index Project.
