= Wilhelm Rollmann =

German U-boat commander

- Born: 5 August 1907; Wilhelmshaven, German Empire
- Died: 5 November 1943 (aged 36); U-848, South Atlantic Ocean, off Ascension Island; 10°09′S 18°00′W
- Military career
- Allegiance: Weimar Republic (to 1933); Nazi Germany
- Branch: Reichsmarine; Kriegsmarine
- Service years: 1926–43
- Rank: Fregattenkapitän
- Commands: U-34; U-848
- Conflicts: World War II: Operation Weserübung; Battle of the Atlantic
- Awards: Knight's Cross of the Iron Cross

Wilhelm Rollmann (5 August 1907 – 5 November 1943) was a German U-boat commander during World War II, in which he commanded the U-34 and U-848. He was a recipient of the Knight's Cross of the Iron Cross of Nazi Germany. He was killed in action in 1943, when his U-boat was sunk by Allied aircraft.

== Career ==
Rollmann joined the Reichsmarine of the Weimar Republic on 1 April 1926 as a member of "Crew 26" (the incoming class of 1926). He served on several ships, which included the light cruiser Karlsruhe. He transferred to the U-boat arm in May 1937, taking command of the Type VIIA U-boat U-34 in October 1938. In seven successful combat patrols, he sank 19 merchant ships (including the neutral, clearly marked and fully lit, Greek merchantman Eleni Stathatou and the neutral Petsamo of Finland, with a cargo of maize, sailing from neutral Rosario to neutral Cork), as well as the British destroyer HMS Whirlwind, the submarine HMS Spearfish, and the Norwegian minelayer HNoMS Frøya. Rollmann rescued the sole survivor from Spearfish. On all seven patrols Leutnant zur See Hans-Hartwig Trojer served as second watch officer on U-34. Kapitänleutnant Heinrich Bleichrodt was a commander in training on U-34's sixth patrol under the command of Rollmann. Rollmann left the U-boat in September 1940, and became an instructor in 2. Unterseeboots-Lehr-Division ("2nd U-boat Training Division"). In February 1943 he commissioned the Type IXD U-boat U-848, sinking one merchant ship on his first and only patrol, bringing his career total to 20 merchant ships sunk for a total of 96,562 GRT, three warships sunk (2,365 GRT) and two ships captured for a total of 4,957 GRT.

== Death ==
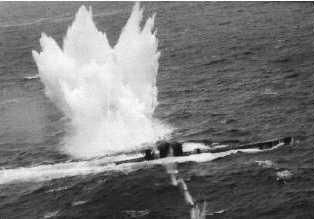
U-848 under attack

Wilhelm Rollmann and his entire crew were killed in action on 5 November 1943 when U-848 was sunk by depth charges from three Liberator and two Mitchell aircraft from the United States Navy Squadron VB-107 and the US Army 1st Composite Squadron south-west of Ascension Island.

== Awards ==
- Wehrmacht Long Service Award 4th Class (2 October 1936)
- Wehrmacht Long Service Award 3rd Class (1 April 1938)
- Iron Cross (1939) 2nd Class (26 September 1939) & 1st Class (7 February 1940)
- U-boat War Badge (1939) (12 November 1939)
- Knight's Cross of the Iron Cross on 31 July 1940 as Kapitänleutnant and commander of U-34
