= German submarine U-34 (1936) =

German World War II submarine

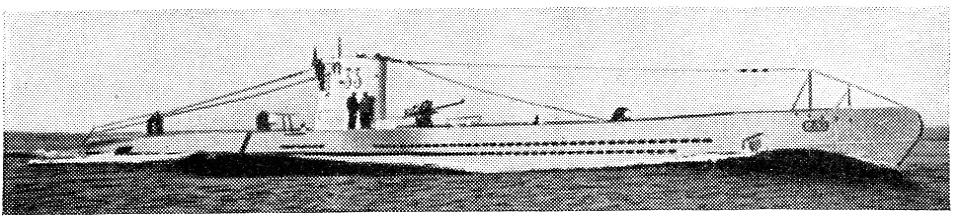
- U-33, a typical Type VIIA boat

History

Nazi Germany
- Name: U-34
- Ordered: 25 March 1935
- Builder: Germaniawerft, Kiel
- Cost: 4,189,000 Reichsmark
- Yard number: 557
- Laid down: 15 September 1935
- Launched: 17 July 1936
- Commissioned: 12 September 1936
- Fate: Sunk, 5 August 1943

General characteristics
- Class & type: Type VIIA submarine
- Displacement: 626 tonnes (616 long tons) surfaced; 745 t (733 long tons) submerged
- Length: 64.51 m (211 ft 8 in) o/a; 45.50 m (149 ft 3 in) pressure hull
- Beam: 5.85 m (19 ft 2 in) o/a; 4.70 m (15 ft 5 in) pressure hull
- Height: 9.50 m (31 ft 2 in)
- Draught: 4.37 m (14 ft 4 in)
- Installed power: 2,100–2,310 PS (1,540–1,700 kW; 2,070–2,280 bhp) (diesels); 750 PS (550 kW; 740 shp) (electric)
- Propulsion: 2 shafts; 2 × diesel engines; 2 × electric motors
- Speed: 17 knots (31 km/h; 20 mph) surfaced; 8 knots (15 km/h; 9.2 mph) submerged
- Range: 6,200 nmi (11,500 km; 7,100 mi) at 10 knots (19 km/h; 12 mph) surfaced; 73–94 nmi (135–174 km; 84–108 mi) at 4 knots (7.4 km/h; 4.6 mph) submerged
- Test depth: 220 m (720 ft); Crush depth: 230–250 m (750–820 ft)
- Complement: 4 officers, 40–56 enlisted
- Sensors & processing systems: Gruppenhorchgerät
- Armament: 5 × 53.3 cm (21 in) torpedo tubes (four bow, one stern); 11 × torpedoes or 22 TMA mines; 1 × 8.8 cm (3.46 in) deck gun (220 rounds); 1 × 2 cm (0.79 in) C/30 anti-aircraft gun

Service record
- Part of: 2nd U-boat Flotilla; 12 September 1936 – 30 September 1940; 21st U-boat Flotilla; 1 October – 1 November 1940; 24th U-boat Flotilla; 2 November 1940 – 5 August 1943
- Identification codes: M 15 983
- Commanders: Kptlt. Ernst Sobe; 12 September 1936 – 14 February 1938; Kptlt. Harald Grosse; 4 November – 22 December 1936; Kptlt. Hans Pauckstadt; 15 February – 17 August 1938; 5 September – 28 October 1938; Kptlt. Wilhelm Rollmann; 26 October 1938 – 28 September 1940; Oblt.z.S. Fritz Meyer; 29 September 1940 – 22 May 1941; Oblt.z.S. Karl-Otto Schultz; 23 May – 19 November 1941; Oblt.z.S. Gerhard Remus; 20 November 1941 – 15 June 1942; Oblt.z.S. Horst-Arno Fenski; 16 June 1942 – 1 February 1943; Oblt.z.S. Karl-Heinz Hagenau; 2 February – 11 June 1943; Lt.z.S. Eduard Aust; 12 June – 5 August 1943
- Operations: 1 operation + 7 patrols: Operation Ursula: 20 November - 21 December 1936; 1st patrol: 19 August – 26 September 1939; 2nd patrol: 17 October – 12 November 1939; 3rd patrol: 1 January – 6 February 1940; 4th patrol: 11 – 30 March 1940; 5th patrol: 3 – 30 April 1940; 6th patrol: 22 June – 18 July 1940; 7th patrol: 23 July – 3 August 1940
- Victories: 19 merchant ships sunk (91,989 GRT); 3 warships sunk (2,695 tons); 1 warship total loss (595 tons); 2 merchant ships taken as prize (4,957 GRT)

German submarine U-34 was a Type VIIA U-boat of Nazi Germany's Kriegsmarine during World War II.

She was laid down in September 1935, launched in July 1936 and commissioned in September.

U-34 and sister boat U-33 took part in Operation Ursula during the Spanish Civil War, with U-34 becoming the first German submarine to sink another vessel since the end of World War I in 1918. During World War II the boat carried out seven patrols, sinking 22 ships and capturing two more. She was sunk in a collision in the Baltic in August 1943.

== Design ==
As one of the first ten German Type VII submarines later designated as Type VIIA submarines, U-34 had a displacement of 626 tonnes (616 long tons) when at the surface and 745 tonnes (733 long tons) while submerged. She had a total length of 64.51 m (211 ft 8 in), a pressure hull length of 45.50 m (149 ft 3 in), a beam of 5.85 m (19 ft 2 in), a height of 9.50 m (31 ft 2 in), and a draught of 4.37 m (14 ft 4 in). The submarine was powered by two MAN M 6 V 40/46 four-stroke, six-cylinder diesel engines producing a total of 2,100 to 2,310 metric horsepower (1,540 to 1,700 kW; 2,070 to 2,280 shp) for use while surfaced, two BBC GG UB 720/8 double-acting electric motors producing a total of 750 metric horsepower (550 kW; 740 shp) for use while submerged. She had two shafts and two 1.23 m (4 ft) propellers. The boat was capable of operating at depths of up to 230 metres (750 ft).

The submarine had a maximum surface speed of 17 knots (31 km/h; 20 mph) and a maximum submerged speed of 8 knots (15 km/h; 9.2 mph). When submerged, the boat could operate for 73–94 nautical miles (135–174 km; 84–108 mi) at 4 knots (7.4 km/h; 4.6 mph); when surfaced, she could travel 6,200 nautical miles (11,500 km; 7,100 mi) at 10 knots (19 km/h; 12 mph). U-34 was fitted with five 53.3 cm (21 in) torpedo tubes (four fitted at the bow and one at the stern), eleven torpedoes, one 8.8 cm (3.46 in) SK C/35 naval gun, 220 rounds, and an anti-aircraft gun. The boat had a complement of between forty-four and sixty.

== Service history ==
She was laid down on 15 September 1935 by the Germaniawerft at Kiel as yard number 557, launched on 17 July 1936 and commissioned on 12 September 1936 under the command of Kapitänleutnant (Kptlt.) Ernst Sobe.

After commissioning, U-34 was a part of the 2nd U-boat Flotilla until September 1940. She was then sent to the 21st flotilla for less than a month. She spent almost the next three years with the 24th flotilla.

=== Spanish Civil War ===
U-34 took part in Operation Ursula—the German submarine operation in support of Francisco Franco's Nationalist naval forces during the Spanish Civil War. Under the command of Kptlt. Harald Grosse, she sank the Spanish Republican Navy submarine C-3 off Málaga, Spain, on 12 December 1936.

=== World War II ===
==== First patrol ====
The U-boat left Wilhelmshaven (which was to be her base until July 1940), on 19 August 1939. Her route took her across the North Sea to the 'gap' between Iceland and the Faroe Islands. She entered the Atlantic Ocean on about the 24th and headed south, to the west of Ireland. On 7 September she sank Pukkastan about 39 nmi (72 km; 45 mi) southwest of Bishop Rock after getting the ship to stop with two rounds fired across her bows with the deck gun.

The next day she repeated the exercise and sank Kennebec about 70 nmi (130 km; 81 mi) southwest of the Scilly Isles.

She also damaged, then captured Hanonia and her cargo of timber off Norway. The ship had been bound for a British port, but instead she was taken to Kiel and on to Hamburg by a prize crew.

The boat returned to Wilhelmshaven on 26 September.

==== Second patrol ====
U-34's second foray was even more fruitful, sinking Gustav Adolf and Sea Venture (which had replied to the U-boats' warning shots with fire of her own), both on 20 October 1939. Bronte on the 27th and Malabar went to the bottom on the 29th. The boat also captured Snar in the North Sea on 9 November.

==== Third patrol ====
The first victim of this sortie was Caroni River in Falmouth Bay on 20 January 1940.

The next was the neutral, clearly marked and fully lit, Greek merchantman Eleni Stathatou at 48.49°N 8.34°W on the 28th. The survivors were eventually rescued by Michael Casey, a fisherman from Kerry, who towed them to Portmagee. 13 died of exposure. The 20 survivors were so weak that they had to be carried ashore.

==== Fourth and fifth patrols ====
Patrol number four, in March 1940, was through the North Sea and the Norwegian Sea. It was remarkable only for its lack of 'kills'.

U-34 torpedoed the already scuttled Norwegian minelayer HNoMS Frøya on 13 April 1940 near Søtvika to prevent her salvage.

==== Sixth patrol ====
The boat used the so-called Faroes/Shetland 'gap' (which she had cleared by 26 June 1940), to enter the Atlantic; she had left Wilhelmshaven on the 22nd. On 5 July she sank the British destroyer HMS Whirlwind 120 nmi (220 km; 140 mi) west of Lands End.

Less than 24 hours later she had also accounted for Vapper south of Cape Clear, (southern Ireland).

There followed a steady stream of victories in the same area: Lucrecia, Tiiu, Petsamo, Janna and Evdoxia. Having run out of torpedoes, U-34 sank Naftilos with gunfire.

The boat docked at the newly occupied port of Lorient, on the French Atlantic coast, on 18 July.

==== Seventh patrol ====
The sinkings continued; Vinnemoor on 26 July 1940; Accra on the same day and in the same attack and Sambre and Thiara, both on the 27th. Returning to Germany, the boat came across the British submarine Spearfish. Using her last torpedo, the U-boat managed to sink the British unit. There was only one survivor from Spearfish, and he was captured by the Germans.

=== Fate ===
She was sunk at 21:55 on 5 August 1943 at Memel (today's Klaipėda in Lithuania), in the Baltic, in position 55°42′N 21°09′E after a collision with the U-boat tender Lech. Four men died, although 39 survived. The boat was raised on 24 August but stricken on 8 September 1943.

== Summary of raiding history ==
Date	Name of Ship	Nationality	Tonnage (Note: Merchant ship tonnages are in gross register tons. Military vessels are listed by tons displacement.)	Fate
12 December 1936	C-3	Spanish Republic	925	Sunk
7 September 1939	Pukkastan	United Kingdom	5,809	Sunk
8 September 1939	Kennebec	United Kingdom	5,548	Sunk
24 September 1939	Hanonia	Estonia	1,781	Captured as prize
20 October 1939	Gustav Adolf	Sweden	926	Sunk
20 October 1939	Sea Venture	United Kingdom	2,327	Sunk
27 October 1939	Bronte	United Kingdom	5,317	Sunk
29 October 1939	Malabar	United Kingdom	7,976	Sunk
9 November 1939	Snar	Norway	3,176	Captured as prize
20 January 1940	Caroni River	United Kingdom	7,807	Sunk (mine)
28 January 1940	Eleni Stathatou	Greece	5,625	Sunk
13 April 1940	HNoMS Frøya	Royal Norwegian Navy	595	Total loss
5 July 1940	HMS Whirlwind	Royal Navy	1,100	Sunk
6 July 1940	Vapper	Estonia	4,543	Sunk
7 July 1940	Lucrecia	Netherlands	2,584	Sunk
9 July 1940	Tiiu	Estonia	1,865	Sunk
10 July 1940	Petsamo	Finland	4,596	Sunk
11 July 1940	Janna	Norway	2,197	Sunk
15 July 1940	Evdoxia	Greece	2,018	Sunk
15 July 1940	Naftilos	Greece	3,531	Sunk
26 July 1940	Accra	United Kingdom	9,337	Sunk
26 July 1940	Vinemoor	United Kingdom	4,359	Sunk
27 July 1940	Sambre	United Kingdom	5,260	Sunk
27 July 1940	Thiara	United Kingdom	10,364	Sunk
1 August 1940	HMS Spearfish	Royal Navy	670	Sunk

== Bibliography ==
- Busch, Rainer; Röll, Hans-Joachim (1999). German U-boat commanders of World War II : a biographical dictionary. Translated by Brooks, Geoffrey. London, Annapolis, Md: Greenhill Books, Naval Institute Press. ISBN 1-55750-186-6.
- Busch, Rainer; Röll, Hans-Joachim (1999). Der U-Boot-Krieg, 1939-1945: Deutsche U-Boot-Verluste von September 1939 bis Mai 1945 [German U-boat losses from September 1939 to May 1945] (in German). Vol. IV. Hamburg, Berlin, Bonn: Mittler. ISBN 3-8132-0514-2.
- Gröner, Eric; Jung, Dieter; Maass, Martin (1991). German Warships 1815-1945: U-boats and Mine Warfare Vessels. Vol. 2. Translated by Thomas, Keith; Magowan, Rachel. London: Conway Maritime Press. ISBN 0-85177-593-4.
- Kemp, Paul (1999). U-Boats Destroyed - German Submarine Losses in the World Wars. London: Arms & Armour. ISBN 1-85409-515-3.
