= HMS Spearfish =

Submarine of the Royal Navy

Coordinates: 57°50′N 11°00′E

- Spearfish on the surface

History

United Kingdom
- Name: Spearfish
- Ordered: 18 February 1935
- Builder: Cammell Laird, Birkenhead
- Laid down: 23 May 1935
- Launched: 21 April 1936
- Commissioned: 11 December 1936
- Fate: Sunk, 1 August 1940
- Badge

General characteristics
- Class & type: S-class submarine
- Displacement: 768 long tons (780 t) surfaced; 960 long tons (980 t) submerged
- Length: 208 ft 8 in (63.6 m)
- Beam: 24 ft (7.3 m)
- Draught: 11 ft 10 in (3.6 m)
- Installed power: 1,550 bhp (1,160 kW) (diesel); 1,300 hp (970 kW) (electric)
- Propulsion: 2 × diesel engines; 2 × electric motors
- Speed: 13.75 knots (25.47 km/h; 15.82 mph) surfaced; 10 knots (19 km/h; 12 mph) submerged
- Range: 6,000 nmi (11,000 km; 6,900 mi) at 10 knots (19 km/h; 12 mph) surface; 64 nmi (119 km; 74 mi) at 2 knots (3.7 km/h; 2.3 mph) submerged
- Test depth: 300 feet (91.4 m)
- Complement: 40
- Armament: 6 × bow 21 in (533 mm) torpedo tubes; 1 × 3-inch (76 mm) deck gun

HMS Spearfish was a second-batch S-class submarine built during the 1930s for the Royal Navy. Completed in 1936, the boat participated in the Second World War. The submarine was one of the 12 boats named in the song "Twelve Little S-Boats". So far she has been the only ship of the Royal Navy to be named Spearfish.

== Design and description ==
The second batch of S-class submarines were designed as slightly improved and enlarged versions of the earlier boats of the class and were intended to operate in the North and Baltic Seas. The submarines had a length of 208 feet 8 inches (63.6 m) overall, a beam of 24 feet (7.3 m) and a mean draught of 11 feet 10 inches (3.6 m). They displaced 768 long tons (780 t) on the surface and 960 long tons (980 t) submerged. The S-class submarines had a crew of 40 officers and ratings. They had a diving depth of 300 feet (91.4 m).

For surface running, the boats were powered by two 775-brake-horsepower (578 kW) diesel engines, each driving one propeller shaft. When submerged each propeller was driven by a 650-horsepower (485 kW) electric motor. They could reach 13.75 knots (25.47 km/h; 15.82 mph) on the surface and 10 knots (19 km/h; 12 mph) underwater. On the surface, the second-batch boats had a range of 6,000 nautical miles (11,000 km; 6,900 mi) at 10 knots (19 km/h; 12 mph) and 64 nmi (119 km; 74 mi) at 2 knots (3.7 km/h; 2.3 mph) submerged.

The S-class boats were armed with six 21 inch (533 mm) torpedo tubes in the bow. They carried six reload torpedoes for a total of a dozen torpedoes. They were also armed with a 3-inch (76 mm) deck gun.

== Construction and career ==
Ordered on 18 February 1935, Spearfish was laid down on 23 May 1935 in Cammell Laird's shipyard in Birkenhead and was launched on 21 April 1936. The boat was completed on 11 December 1936.

Her wartime career started inauspiciously, when on 24 September 1939, she was heavily damaged by German warships off Horns Reef. She managed to escape despite being unable to submerge. A rescue mission was undertaken by the British Humber force and Home Fleet, including the aircraft carrier HMS Ark Royal, and the battleship HMS Nelson, which performed escort duty whilst search and rescue attempts were made. The fleet was attacked by Junkers Ju 88 bombers of the Luftwaffe's Kampfgeschwader 30, and a bomb caused slight damage to the battlecruiser HMS Hood. Spearfish safely put in Rosyth on 26 September, and repairs were completed in early March 1940.

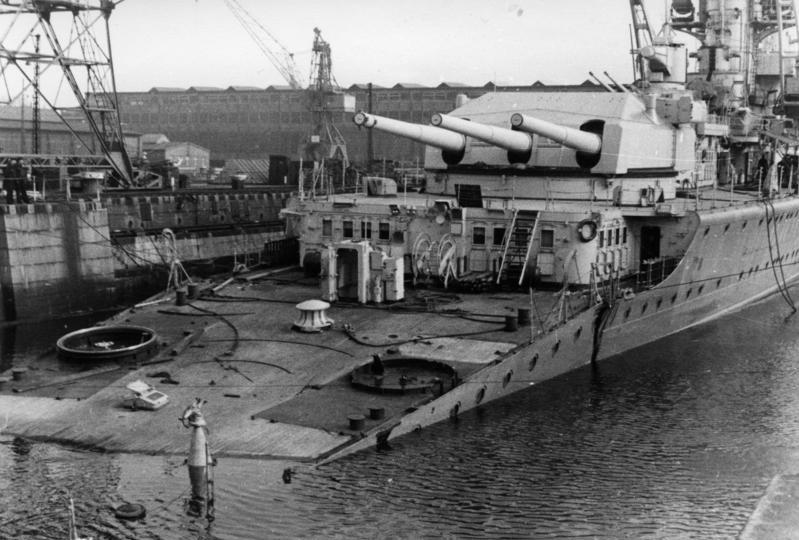
Lützow in Kiel harbour after being torpedoed by Spearfish on her way back from Norway

Another notable action occurred on 11 April 1940, whilst patrolling in the Kattegat, under the command of Lieutenant Commander John Hay Forbes, she torpedoed and damaged the German heavy cruiser Lützow, putting her out of action for over a year. At the time it was reported that she sank her sister ship, Admiral Scheer. Later that year, on 20 May, she sank two Danish fishing vessels S.130 and S.175 with gunfire in the North Sea.

Spearfish sailed from Rosyth on 31 July 1940, still under the command of "Jock" Forbes, to patrol off the Norwegian coast. On 1 August she was spotted on the surface by the German submarine U-34 under the command of Wilhelm Rollmann who attacked and sank her, about 180 miles (290 km) west-southwest of Stavanger. There was only one survivor, Able Seaman William Pester, who was taken aboard the U-34 as a prisoner of war.
