= SS Clearton =

British cargo steamship

- Clearton in port

History

United Kingdom
- Name: Clearton
- Owner: 1919: Carlton SS Co; 1924: R Chapman & Sons
- Operator: R Chapman & Sons
- Port of registry: Newcastle upon Tyne
- Builder: Richardson, Duck & Co, South Stockton & Thornaby
- Yard number: 677
- Launched: 29 July 1919
- Completed: September 1919
- Identification: UK official number 142845; until 1933: code letters KCPB; by 1930: call sign GKSP
- Fate: sunk by torpedo, 1 July 1940

General characteristics
- Class & type: War Standard Type B cargo steamship
- Tonnage: 5,219 GRT, 3,209 NRT
- Length: 400.2 ft (122.0 m)
- Beam: 52.4 ft (16.0 m)
- Depth: 28.4 ft (8.7 m)
- Decks: 2
- Installed power: 1 × triple-expansion engine; 397 NHP
- Propulsion: 1 × screw
- Speed: 11 knots (20 km/h)
- Crew: 34
- Armament: by 1940: DEMS

SS Clearton was a cargo steamship that was built in England in 1919. She was a War Standard Type B ship, ordered by the UK Shipping Controller. She was completed for R Chapman & Son, Ltd, of Newcastle upon Tyne, who owned her throughout her career. A U-boat sank her in the Battle of the Atlantic in 1940, killing nine members of Clearton's crew.

== Building and registration ==
After the First World War, R Chapman & Son acquired several newly-built War Standard cargo ships. They included three Type B's: Innerton (originally War Scilla) and Clearton in 1919, and Tiberton in 1920. All three were built on Teesside: Innerton by Ropner & Sons at Stockton, and Clearton and Tiberton by Richardson, Duck and Company at South Stockton and Thornaby.

Richardson, Duck & Co built Clearton as yard number 677. She was launched on 29 July 1919, and completed that September. Her registered length was 400.2 ft (122.0 m), her beam was 52.4 ft (16.0 m), and her depth was 28.4 ft (8.7 m). Her tonnages were 5,219 GRT and 3,209 NRT. She had a single screw, driven by a three-cylinder triple-expansion steam engine built by Blair and Company of Stockton. It was rated at 397 NHP, and gave her a speed of 11 knots (20 km/h).

Chapman & Son registered her at Newcastle. Her UK official number was 142845 and her code letters were KCPB. At first the Carlton Steam Ship Company owned her, and Chapman and Sons managed her. By 1924 Chapman & Son were her owners as well as her managers. By 1930 her call sign was GKSP. By 1934 this had superseded her code letters.

== War service ==
On 14 September 1939, a fortnight after the Second World War began, Clearton arrived off Freetown, Sierra Leone. She joined Convoy SL 2, which left a week later for Liverpool. Clearton detached from SL 2, and reached Belfast on 10 October.

Clearton sailed unescorted from Belfast first to Barry in south Wales, and then to Milford Haven. On 21 November she left Milford Haven to join Convoy OB 38, which was outbound from Liverpool. OB 38 dispersed at sea two days later, and Clearton continued unescorted to Montevideo in Uruguay, where she arrived on 28 December. She called at Buenos Aires and Rosario in Argentina; and again at Montevideo, where she left on 22 January 1940, with a cargo of grain. She returned home via Freetown, where she joined Convoy SL 21, which left on 18 February for Liverpool. In home waters she detached from SL 21 and steamed to the Thames Estuary off Southend. There she joined Convoy FN 115, which was a North Sea convoy to Methil. She detached from FN 115, and arrived in Hull on 10 March.

=== Loss ===
On 24 March 1940, Clearton left Hull and joined Convoy FS 128, which was southbound from the Tyne to the Thames Estuary off Southend. She left the Thames on 29 March, and arrived in Rosario on 3 May. She called at Buenos Aires, where she left on 16 May, carrying 7,320 tons of grain. On 7 June she arrived off Freetown, where on 15 June she left with Convoy SL 36.

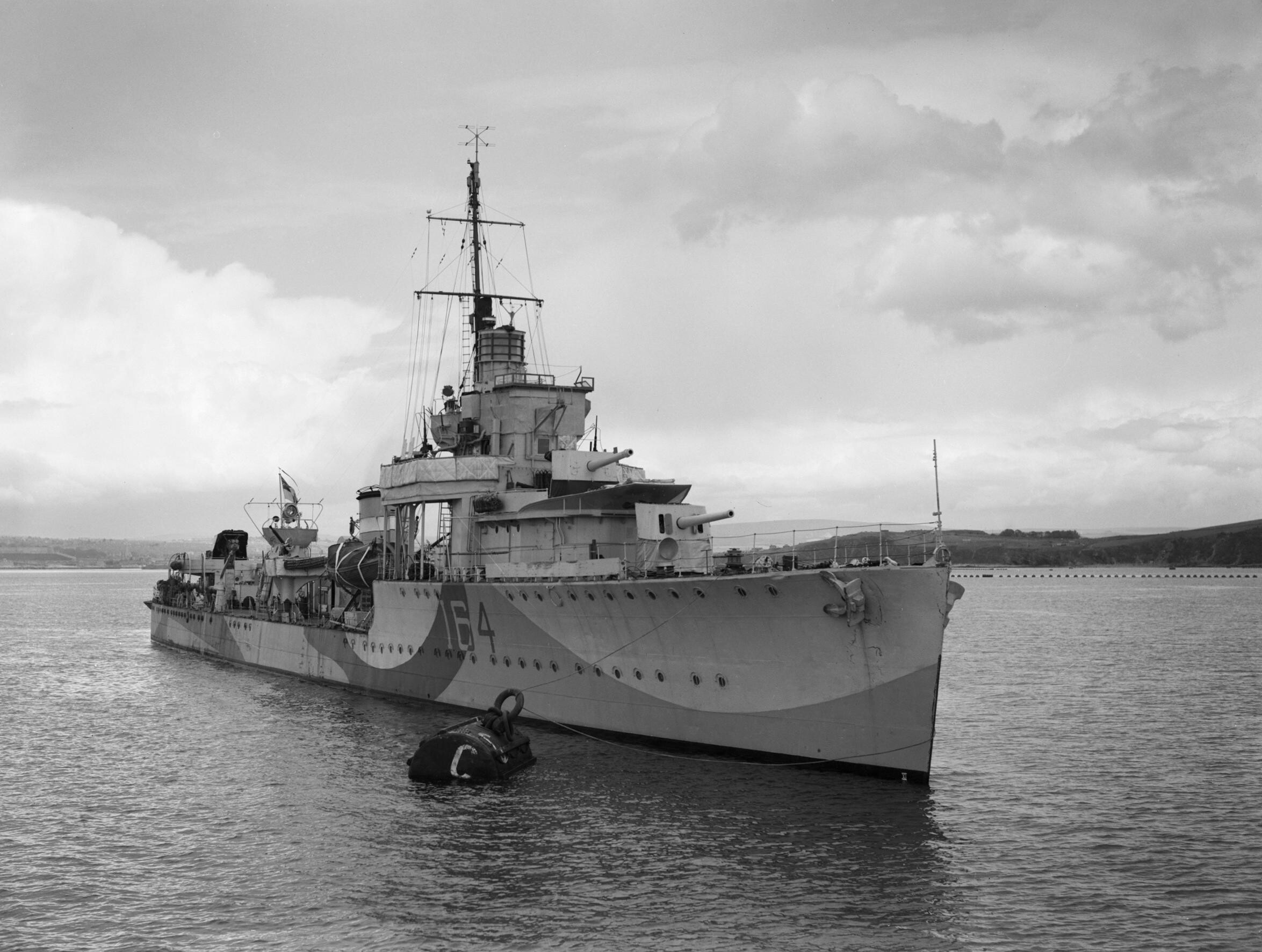
The destroyer HMS Vansittart

At 11:55 hrs on 1 July U-102 hit her with one torpedo in the Southwest Approaches about 180 nautical miles (330 km) west of Ushant. Clearton stayed afloat, but straggled from the convoy. At 13:25 hrs U-102 hit her with a second torpedo, sinking her 240 nautical miles (440 km) off the Smalls at position 47°53′N 9°30′W.

Nine members of Clearton's 34 crew were killed. The destroyer HMS Vansittart rescued 26 survivors, including Clearton's Master, Captain John Elsdon, and one DEMS gunner. Vansittart landed the survivors at Plymouth on 4 July.

== Bibliography ==
- Lloyd's Register of Shipping. Vol. II.–Steamers. London: Lloyd's Register of Shipping. 1920 – via Internet Archive.
- Lloyd's Register of Shipping. Vol. II.–Steamers and Motor Vessels. London: Lloyd's Register of Shipping. 1923 – via Internet Archive.
- Lloyd's Register of Shipping (PDF). Vol. II.–Steamers and Motorships of 300 tons gross and over. London: Lloyd's Register of Shipping. 1934 – via Southampton City Council.
- Mercantile Navy List. London. 1930 – via Crew List Index Project.
