= HMS Vansittart =

Destroyer of the Royal Navy

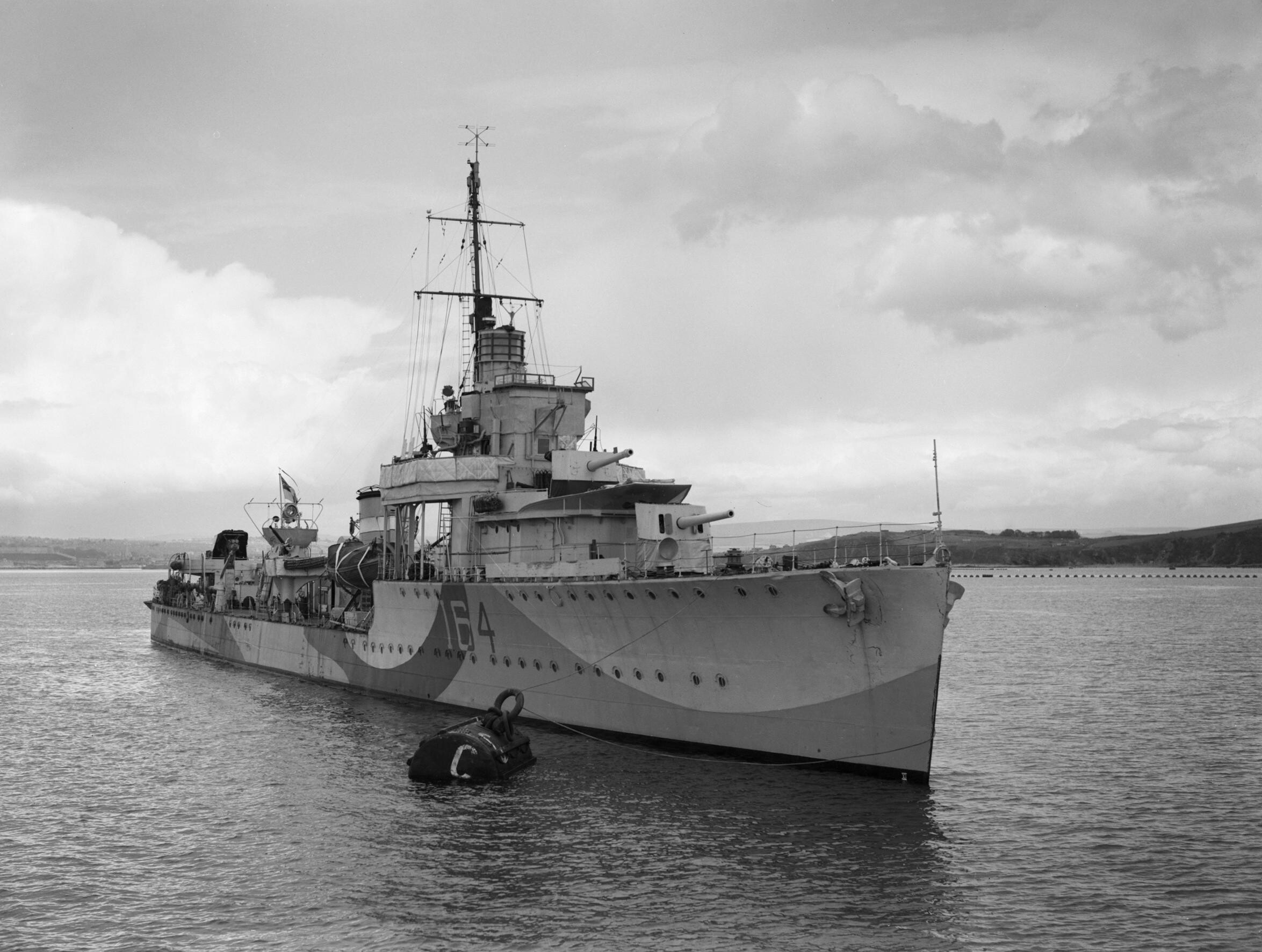
- HMS Vansittart

History

United Kingdom
- Name: HMS Vansittart
- Ordered: January 1918
- Builder: William Beardmore and Company, Dalmuir
- Laid down: 1 January 1918
- Launched: 17 April 1919
- Commissioned: 5 November 1919
- Identification: Pennant numbers D64 and I64
- Motto: Grata quies si merita: 'Rest is pleasant if deserved'
- Honours and awards: Atlantic 1939-45; Norway 1940; Malta Convoys 1942; North Africa 1942
- Fate: Sold for scrap on 25 February 1946
- Badge: On a Field Gold, a Demi-eagle Black.

General characteristics
- Class & type: Admiralty modified W-class destroyer
- Displacement: 1,140 tons standard, 1,550 tons full
- Length: 300 ft o/a, 312 ft p/p
- Beam: 30 ft
- Draught: 10 ft 11 in
- Propulsion: 3 Yarrow type Water-tube boilers, Brown-Curtis steam turbines, 2 shafts, 27,000 shp
- Speed: 34 kn; Reduced to 25 kn 1943
- Range: 320-370 tons oil; 3,500 nmi at 15 kn; 900 nmi at 32 kn
- Complement: 134
- Sensors & processing systems: Type 271 surface warning Radar fitted 1942
- Armament: As built 1920: 4 × BL 4.7 in (120-mm) Mk.I guns mount P Mk.I; 2 × QF 2 pdr Mk.II "pom-pom" (40 mm L/39); 6 × 21-inch Torpedo Tubes; 1943 LRE conversion: 3 × BL 4.7 in (120mm) Mk.I L/45 guns; 1 × QF 12 pounder 12 cwt naval gun; 2 × QF 2 pdr Mk.II "pom-pom" (40 mm L/39); 2 × 20mm Oerlikon cannons; 3 × 21-inch Torpedo Tubes (one triple mount); 2 × depth charge racks; Hedgehog anti-submarine mortar

Service record
- Operations: Second World War
- Victories: U-102

HMS Vansittart was an Admiralty modified W-class destroyer built for the Royal Navy. She was ordered in January 1918 from William Beardmore & Company with the 13th Order for Destroyers of the Emergency War Program of 1918–19. She was the second Royal Navy ship to carry the name which was first used in 1821 for a hired packet.

== Construction ==
HMS Vansittart's keel was laid on 7 January 1918 at the William Beardmore & Company Shipyard at Dalmuir. She was launched on 17 April 1919. She was 312 feet overall in length with a beam of 29.5 feet. Her mean draught was 9 feet, and would reach 11.25 feet under full load. She had a displacement of 1,140 tons standard and up to 1,550 full load.

She was propelled by three Yarrow water tube boilers powering Brown-Curtis geared steam turbines developing 27,000 SHP driving two screws for a maximum designed speed of 34 knots. She was oil-fired and had a bunkerage of 320 to 370 tons. This gave a range of between 3500 nautical miles at 15 knots and 900 nautical miles at 32 knots.

She shipped four BL 4.7 in (120-mm) Mk.I guns, mount P Mk.I naval guns in four single centre-line turrets. The turrets were disposed as two forward and two aft in super imposed firing positions. She also carried two QF 2 pdr Mk.II "pom-pom" (40 mm L/39) mounted abeam between funnels. Abaft of the second funnel, she carried six 21-inch torpedo tubes in two triple mounts on the centre-line.

== Inter-War period ==
HMS Vansittart was commissioned on 5 November 1919 into the Royal Navy and assigned the pennant number D64. After her acceptance trials she was assigned to the 4th Destroyer Flotilla in the Atlantic Fleet. In 1925 the 4th Flotilla was transferred to the Mediterranean. In early 1930s she underwent a refit and was placed in reserve as more modern destroyers came into service. This ship was laid-up in Maintenance Reserve at Rosyth with a special complement. She was reactivated manned by Reservists for a Royal Review at Weymouth in August 1939. As war loomed she was brought to war readiness.

== Second World War ==
HMS Vansittart was allocated to the 15th Destroyer Flotilla in the Western Approaches Command and deployed in the English Channel for convoy defence. Her first deployment was to escort troops of the British Expeditionary Force (BEF) from the Solent to Brest.

In October she was transferred to the 17th Destroyer Flotilla based at Plymouth for convoy defence in the South-West Approaches. She remained in this deployment through April when she was sent to Scapa Flow in response to the German invasion of Norway.

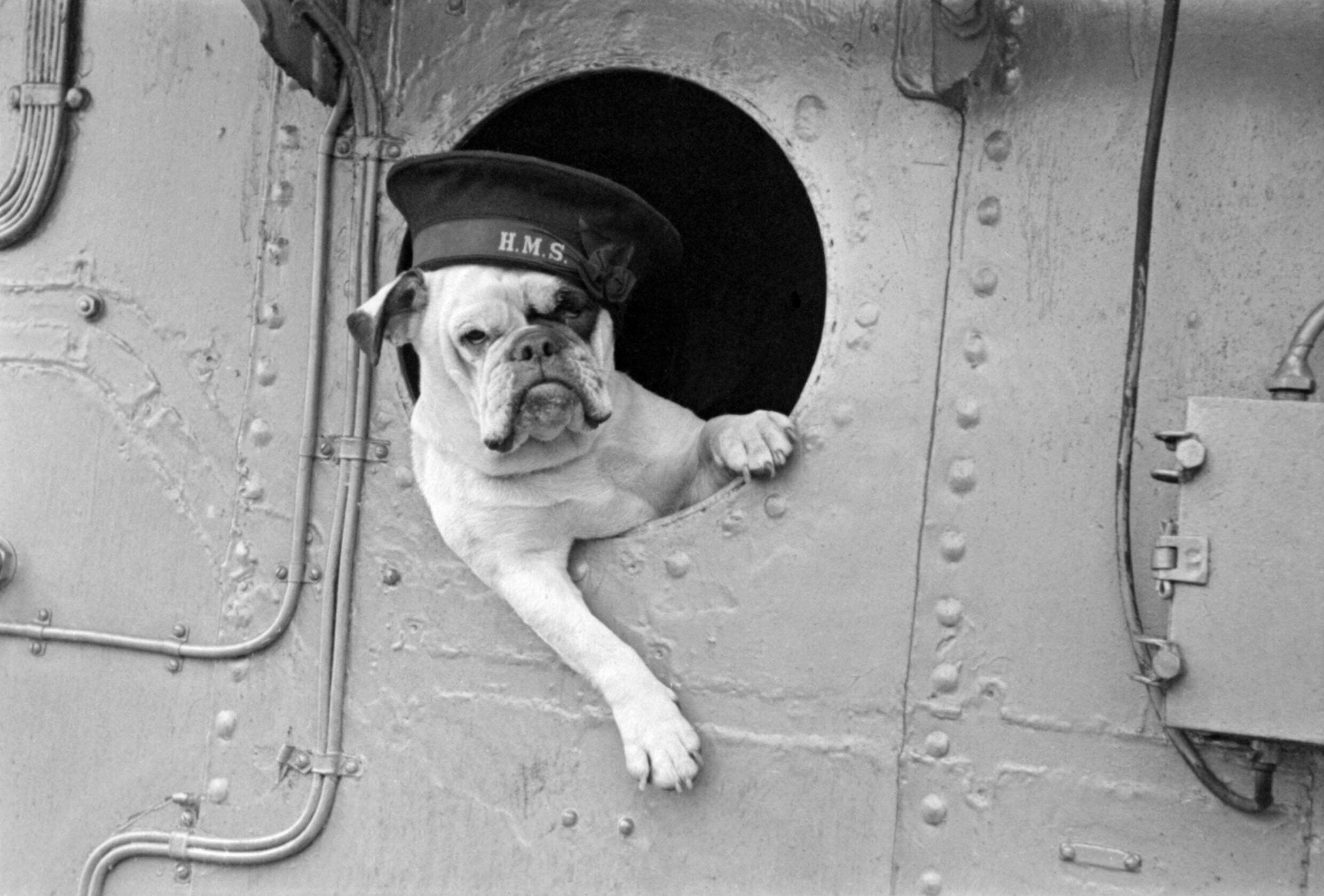
"Venus", the bulldog mascot of HMS Vansittart.

She was deployed in protecting military convoys until she was damaged at Narvik during an air attack on 10 May, during the Battles of Narvik. On 20 May she deployed on Operation Ordnance – the evacuation of Dutch ports including Rotterdam and the Hook of Holland. At the end of May her pennant number was changed to I64 for visual signalling purposes.

In June she was again deployed to the South-West approaches. On 1 July she responded to a distress signal from the torpedoed merchant ship SS Clearton. An hour after arriving on the scene she established a strong ASDIC return and made two runs dropping eleven depth charges set for 350 to 500 feet. After this attack she was unable to re-establish contact, and observed a large oil slick. She recovered the survivors of SS Clearton and remained on patrol until the next day, before returning to port. Post war analysis credited her with the sinking of U-102 on 1 July.

During her career she underwent one reconstruction, to serve as a long range escort. Such maintenance was completed in June 1943.

== Disposition ==
On 25 February 1946, HMS Vansittart was sold to be broken up for scrap.

== Bibliography ==
- Campbell, John (1985). Naval Weapons of World War II. Annapolis, Maryland: Naval Institute Press. ISBN 0-87021-459-4.
- Chesneau, Roger, ed. (1980). Conway's All the World's Fighting Ships 1922–1946. Greenwich, UK: Conway Maritime Press. ISBN 0-85177-146-7.
- Colledge, J. J.; Warlow, Ben (2006) [1969]. Ships of the Royal Navy: The Complete Record of All Fighting Ships of the Royal Navy from the 15th Century to the Present (3rd Rev ed.). London: Chatham Publishing. ISBN 978-1-86176-281-8. OCLC 67375475.
- Cocker, Maurice. Destroyers of the Royal Navy, 1893–1981. Ian Allan. ISBN 0-7110-1075-7.
- Friedman, Norman (2009). British Destroyers From Earliest Days to the Second World War. Annapolis, Maryland: Naval Institute Press. ISBN 978-1-59114-081-8.
- Gardiner, Robert & Gray, Randal, eds. (1985). Conway's All the World's Fighting Ships 1906–1921. Annapolis, Maryland: Naval Institute Press. ISBN 0-85177-245-5.
- Lenton, H. T. (1998). British & Empire Warships of the Second World War. Annapolis, Maryland: Naval Institute Press. ISBN 1-55750-048-7.
- March, Edgar J. (1966). British Destroyers: A History of Development, 1892–1953; Drawn by Admiralty Permission From Official Records & Returns, Ships' Covers & Building Plans. London: Seeley Service. OCLC 164893555.
- Preston, Antony (1971). 'V & W' Class Destroyers 1917–1945. London: Macdonald. OCLC 464542895.
- Raven, Alan & Roberts, John (1979). 'V' and 'W' Class Destroyers. Man o'War. Vol. 2. London: Arms & Armour. ISBN 0-85368-233-X.
- Rohwer, Jürgen (2005). Chronology of the War at Sea 1939–1945: The Naval History of World War Two (Third Revised ed.). Annapolis, Maryland: Naval Institute Press. ISBN 1-59114-119-2.
- Whinney, Bob (2000). The U-boat Peril: A Fight for Survival. Cassell. ISBN 0-304-35132-6.
- Whitley, M. J. (1988). Destroyers of World War 2. Annapolis, Maryland: Naval Institute Press. ISBN 0-87021-326-1.
- Winser, John de D. (1999). B.E.F. Ships Before, At and After Dunkirk. Gravesend, Kent: World Ship Society. ISBN 0-905617-91-6.
