= HMS Whirlwind (D30) =

Destroyer of the Royal Navy

Coordinates: 50°17′N 8°48′W

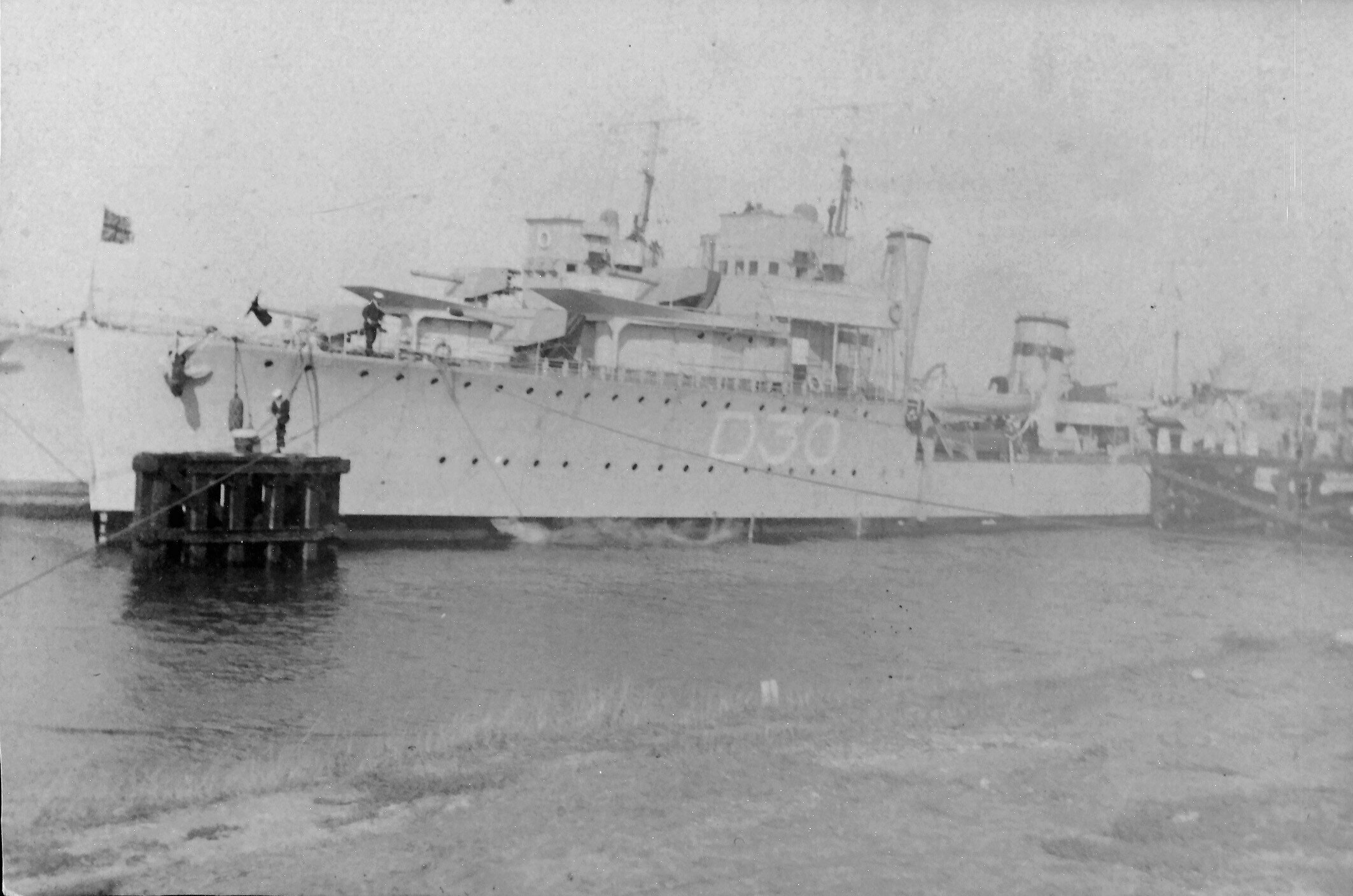
- HMS Whirlwind visits the Dutch port of IJmuiden, date unknown

History

United Kingdom
- Name: HMS Whirlwind
- Ordered: 9 December 1916
- Builder: Swan Hunter
- Launched: 15 December 1917
- Fate: Sunk, 5 July 1940

General characteristics
- Class & type: Admiralty W-class destroyer
- Displacement: 1,100 tons
- Length: 300 ft (91 m) o/a; 312 ft (95 m) p/p
- Beam: 26.75 ft (8.15 m)
- Draught: 9 ft (2.7 m) standard; 11 to 25 ft (3.4 to 7.6 m) in deep
- Propulsion: 3 Yarrow type Water-tube boilers; Brown-Curtis steam turbines; 2 shafts; 27,000 shp (20,000 kW)
- Speed: 34 knots (63 km/h; 39 mph)
- Range: 320-370 tons oil; 3,500 nmi (6,500 km) at 15 knots (28 km/h; 17 mph); 900 nmi (1,700 km) at 32 knots (59 km/h; 37 mph)
- Complement: 110
- Armament: 4 × QF 4 in Mk.V (102mm L/45), mount P Mk.I; 2 × QF 2 pdr Mk.II "pom-pom" (40 mm L/39) or; 1 × QF 3 inch 20 cwt (76 mm), mount HA Mk.II; 6 (2x3) tubes for 21 in torpedoes

The first HMS Whirlwind was a W-class destroyer of the British Royal Navy that saw service during World War I and World War II.

Whirlwind was built by Swan Hunter and was launched on 15 December 1917. In September 1939 was part of the 11th Destroyer Flotilla. On 5 July 1940, she was sunk by the German submarine U-34 under the command of Wilhelm Rollmann in the North Atlantic Ocean southwest of Ireland.

== Bibliography ==
- Campbell, John (1985). Naval Weapons of World War II. Annapolis, Maryland: Naval Institute Press. ISBN 0-87021-459-4.
- Chesneau, Roger, ed. (1980). Conway's All the World's Fighting Ships 1922–1946. Greenwich, UK: Conway Maritime Press. ISBN 0-85177-146-7.
- Colledge, J. J.; Warlow, Ben (2006) [1969]. Ships of the Royal Navy: The Complete Record of All Fighting Ships of the Royal Navy from the 15th Century to the Present (3rd Rev ed.). London: Chatham Publishing. ISBN 978-1-86176-281-8. OCLC 67375475.
- Cocker, Maurice (1981). Destroyers of the Royal Navy, 1893–1981. Ian Allan. ISBN 0-7110-1075-7.
- Friedman, Norman (2009). British Destroyers From Earliest Days to the Second World War. Annapolis, Maryland: Naval Institute Press. ISBN 978-1-59114-081-8.
- Gardiner, Robert & Gray, Randal, eds. (1985). Conway's All the World's Fighting Ships 1906–1921. Annapolis, Maryland: Naval Institute Press. ISBN 0-85177-245-5.
- Lenton, H. T. (1998). British & Empire Warships of the Second World War. Annapolis, Maryland: Naval Institute Press. ISBN 1-55750-048-7.
- March, Edgar J. (1966). British Destroyers: A History of Development, 1892–1953; Drawn by Admiralty Permission From Official Records & Returns, Ships' Covers & Building Plans. London: Seeley Service. OCLC 164893555.
- Preston, Antony (1971). 'V & W' Class Destroyers 1917–1945. London: Macdonald. OCLC 464542895.
- Raven, Alan & Roberts, John (1979). 'V' and 'W' Class Destroyers. Man o'War. Vol. 2. London: Arms & Armour. ISBN 0-85368-233-X.
- Rohwer, Jürgen (2005). Chronology of the War at Sea 1939–1945: The Naval History of World War Two (Third Revised ed.). Annapolis, Maryland: Naval Institute Press. ISBN 1-59114-119-2.
- Whinney, Bob (2000). The U-boat Peril: A Fight for Survival. Cassell. ISBN 0-304-35132-6.
- Whitley, M. J. (1988). Destroyers of World War 2. Annapolis, Maryland: Naval Institute Press. ISBN 0-87021-326-1.
- Winser, John de D. (1999). B.E.F. Ships Before, At and After Dunkirk. Gravesend, Kent: World Ship Society. ISBN 0-905617-91-6.
