= Convoy SC 7 order of battle =

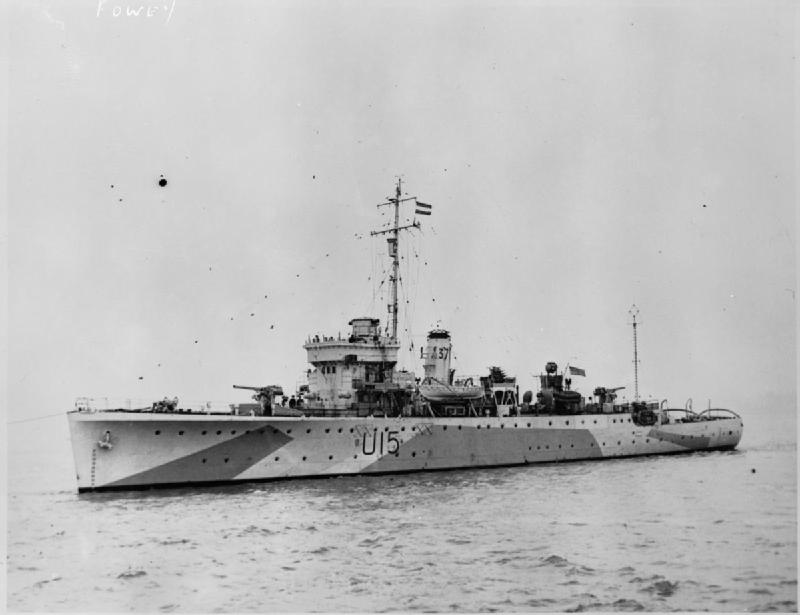
HMS Fowey was one of the Royal Navy ships to come to the assistance of the convoy

Convoy SC 7 was the seventh of the SC convoys, bound from Sydney, Nova Scotia across the North Atlantic to British ports, mainly Liverpool. They were called SC as their departure point was designated Sydney, Cape Breton to avoid confusion with Sydney in Australia. The convoys formed part of the battle of the Atlantic during the Second World War. Large numbers of merchant ships travelled with naval escorts to protect against U-boat attacks. The convoys were often slow, the merchantmen often only being capable of a speed of around 8 kn (15 km/h; 9.2 mph) and so were particularly vulnerable to attack. This problem was exacerbated by a shortage of suitable escorts from either the Royal Canadian Navy or the Royal Navy early in the war.

Convoy SC 7 left Sydney on 5 October 1940, consisting of 36 freighters initially escorted by the Canadian armed yacht HMCS Elk and the British sloop HMS Scarborough. Having seen the convoy out of Canadian waters, Elk turned back on 7 October, leaving the convoy to spend three-quarters of the crossing escorted by Scarborough. SS Winona had developed engine problems and also turned back. The crossing was uneventful, the only casualty being SS Trevisa, which straggled behind the convoy and was torpedoed and sunk near Rockall on 16 October by U-124.

The main convoy was spotted the following day by U-38, which sank SS Aenos. Further sporadic attacks continued that day and the following, despite the arrival of the sloop HMS Fowey and the corvette HMS Bluebell. The night of 18/19 October saw the use of the wolf pack tactic by the U-boats. Five U-boats; U-46, U-99, U-100, U-101 and U-123 attacked together, overwhelming the escorts, despite being reinforced by HMS Leith and Heartsease. They sank 16 ships in a six-hours, bringing the total to twenty freighters sunk and a total tonnage lost of 79,592 gross registered tons. The U-boats only broke off their attacks to intercept convoy HX 79, which had arrived in the area. They went on to sink a further 12 ships from this convoy, for a total of 28 ships sunk on 18/19 October, making this the deadliest two days of the battle of the Atlantic. The surviving merchant ships were gathered up by the remaining escorts and brought into port several days later.

== Merchant ships ==
This along with the * indicates that the ship was sunk

Name	Flag	Cargo	Fate	Date	Lived	Died	Notes
Aenos	Greece	Wheat	Sunk, U-38*	17 October	25	4	Straggler
Assyrian	United Kingdom	Grain	Sunk, U-101*	19 October	34	17	Convoy commodore's ship
Beatus	United Kingdom	Steel, timber, aircraft	Sunk, U-46*	18 October	37	0	
Blairspey	United Kingdom	Timber	Damaged, U-101; Damaged, U-100	18 October; 19 October	34	0	Reached port, repaired
Boekelo	Netherlands	Timber	Damaged, U-100; Sunk, U-123*	18 October; 19 October	25	0	Straggler
Botusk	United Kingdom	Timber	Reached port		42	0	
Carsbreck	United Kingdom	Timber	Damaged, U-38	18 October	55	0	Towed into port
Clintonia	United Kingdom	Pulpwood	Damaged, U-99; Sunk, U-123*	19 October; 19 October	35	1	
SS Convallaria	Sweden	Pulpwood	Sunk, U-46*	18 October	22	0	
Corinthic	United Kingdom	Steel, scrap metal	Reached port		21	0	
Creekirk	United Kingdom	Iron ore	Sunk, U-101*	18 October	0	36	
Dioni	Greece	Grain	Reached port		82	0	
Eaglescliffe Hall	United Kingdom	Timber	Reached port		64	0	
Empire Brigade	United Kingdom	Metals, ores	Sunk, U-99*	19 October	35	6	
Empire Miniver	United Kingdom	Pig iron, steel	Sunk, U-99*	19 October	35	3	
Fiscus	United Kingdom	Steel, timber, aircraft	Sunk, U-99*	18 October	1	38	Straggler
Flynderborg	United Kingdom	Pulpwood	Reached port		12	0	
SS Gunborg	Sweden	Pulpwood	Sunk, U-46*	18 October	23	0	
Havørn	Norway	Pit props	Reached port		53	0	
Inger Elisabeth	Norway	Pit props	Reached port		44	0	
Karlander	Norway	Timber	Reached port		92	0	
Languedoc	United Kingdom	Fuel oil	Sunk, U-48*	17 October	39	0	
SS Niritos	Greece	Sulphur	Sunk, U-99*	18 October	27	1	
Scoresby	United Kingdom	Pit props	Sunk, U-48*	17 October	39	0	
SS Sedgepool	United Kingdom	Wheat	Sunk, U-123*	19 October	36	3	
SS Shekatika	United Kingdom	Pit props, steel	Damaged, U-123, U-100; Sunk, U-123*	19 October	36	0	Joined from convoy SHX 76. 'Romper' (travelling ahead of the convoy)
Snefjeld	Norway	Timber	Sunk, U-99*	19 October	21	0	
Sneland I	Norway	Sulphur	Reached port		94	0	
Soesterberg	Netherlands	Pit props	Sunk, U-101*	19 October	19	6	
Somersby	United Kingdom	Flour	Reached port		83	0	
SS Thalia	Greece	Steel, lead, zinc	Sunk, U-99*	19 October	4	22	
Thorøy	Norway	Fuel oil	Reached port		63	0	
SS Trevisa	Canada	Timber	Sunk, U-124*	16 October	14	7	Straggler. First sinking.
Trident	United Kingdom	Steel, timber	Reached port		43	0	
Valparaiso	Sweden	General cargo	Reached port		14	0	
Winona	United States	Timber	Returned to port		34	0	

== Escorts ==
Name	Navy	Class	Dates	Notes
HMS Bluebell	Royal Navy	Flower-class corvette	18–21 October	
HMS Heartsease	Royal Navy	Flower-class corvette	18–21 October	Dispatched with Carsbreck, 18 October
HMS Leith	Royal Navy	Grimsby-class sloop	18–21 October	
HMS Scarborough	Royal Navy	Hastings-class sloop	5–21 October	Lost contact 17 October, unable to rejoin
HMS Fowey	Royal Navy	Shoreham-class sloop	18–21 October	
HMCS Elk	Royal Canadian Navy	Armed yacht	5 –7 October	

== U-boats ==
Name	Flag	Commander	Sunk	Damaged	Notes
U-38	Kriegsmarine	Heinrich Liebe	1	1	
U-46	Kriegsmarine	Engelbert Endrass	3	0	
U-48	Kriegsmarine	Heinrich Bleichrodt	2	0	
U-99	Kriegsmarine	Otto Kretschmer	6	1	
U-100	Kriegsmarine	Joachim Schepke	0	3	
U-101	Kriegsmarine	Fritz Frauenheim	3	1	
U-123	Kriegsmarine	Karl-Heinz Moehle	4	0	
U-124	Kriegsmarine	Georg-Wilhelm Schulz	1	0	
