= Lachlan Mackinnon (Royal Navy officer) =

Vice-Admiral Lachlan Mackinnon CB CVO
- Born: 2 December 1882
- Died: 11 October 1948 (aged 65)
- Military career
- Allegiance: United Kingdom
- Branch: Royal Navy
- Service years: 1898-1939
- Rank: Vice-Admiral
- Commands: HMS Assistance; HMS Danae; HMS Warspite; 2nd Battle Squadron
- Conflicts: Boxer Rebellion; World War I World War II
- Awards: Companion of the Order of the Bath; Commander of the Royal Victorian Order

Vice-Admiral Lachlan Donald Ian Mackinnon, CB, CVO (2 December 1882 – 11 October 1948) was a Royal Navy officer, especially noted for his role as a convoy commodore during the Second World War.

== Early career ==
His father was a clergyman and Lachlan entered the Royal Navy in 1898. He received the China Medal for service in the Boxer Rebellion, was promoted to acting sub-lieutenant on 15 November 1901, and subsequently confirmed in that rank from the same date. He was in early November 1902 mentioned for service on the torpedo gunboat HMS Alarm, but the appointment was cancelled and he was instead posted to the destroyer HMS Syren on 18 November, serving in Home waters.

He was seconded to the navy of the Ottoman Empire from 1910 to 1912.

During the First World War, Mackinnon served aboard the battlecruiser, HMS Indomitable, and the battleship, HMS Barham. He was present for the bombardment of the Dardanelles forts in 1914 and was present at the battles of Dogger Bank and Jutland, where he was gunnery officer of the Indomitable.

He became commanding officer of the repair ship HMS Assistance in 1924 and of the cruiser HMS Danae in 1926. He went on to be Captain of the Fleet for the Mediterranean Fleet in 1930, commanding officer of the battleship HMS Warspite in 1932 and Chief of Staff to the Commander-in-Chief, Portsmouth in 1933. After that, he was appointed in command of the 2nd Battle Squadron in 1937 with his flag aboard HMS Royal Oak before retiring as a vice admiral on 11 January 1939.

== Return to service ==
From 16 September 1939 he joined the Royal Navy Reserve as a captain and served as a convoy commodore until 1941. He was one of the first commodores to put to sea. He completed 11 ocean convoys before he was sent to take charge of Convoy SC 7.

Convoy SC 7 was out of Sydney, Nova Scotia. The slow convoy of 35 ships sailed on 5 October 1940 bound for the United Kingdom with a very inadequate escort. For most of their journey, SC 7 had only one escort, the Hastings-class sloop HMS Scarborough, which was not fitted with ASDIC. Mackinnon was aboard SS Assyrian, built in Hamburg in 1914 and was carrying a cargo of grain. Mackinnon brought with him his team of five sailors, a Yeoman of Signals, two telegraphists and two young bunting tossers (i.e. sailors in charge of hoisting signal flags). The signals crew was important as the convoys maintained radio silence to avoid detection by the German navy.

On the afternoon of 16 October the convoy was met by two Royal Navy ships, the sloop, HMS Fowey, and the corvette, HMS Bluebell. That night all three escorts went off in various direction pursuing reports of U-boats or rescuing survivors of the two ships hit early the next morning. The convoy was left defenceless in the face of the gathering six submarines which included the ace Otto Kretschmer in U-99, resulting in the convoy taking heavy losses.

On 19 October, as the convoy approached the British Isles, Mackinnon sighted a U-boat 100 yards ahead. Assyrian went full ahead to ram her, making 10 knots for the first time in recent memory and chasing the enemy ship for 40 minutes. However, Assyrian's main gun was astern, she was unable to bring any of her small guns to bear, and slowly the U-boat drew away. Now ahead of the convoy, with no escorts around, the old ship was vulnerable. Two torpedoes missed her but a third caught her on the starboard side stopping the engines and putting out her lights. Both ship's boats were damaged in the explosion and most of the surviving crew took to the life-rafts. A sinking merchantman drifted down upon the Assyrian, her pit props rolling off and further damaging the ship and sinking one of the life-rafts which had been launched. A small group including the ship's Master, the Chief Officer and Mackinnon were stranded aboard the sinking ship. They set to building a raft out of whatever they could find and launched it as the ship went down. The raft fell to bits as it hit the water. Mackinnon, then 58, went into the cold North Atlantic. He swam to a plank and hung on. The Grimsby-class sloop HMS Leith found him at the very end of his strength, unable to swim or grasp a rope. They hoisted him aboard in a net.

Mackinnon developed pneumonia and barely survived. Though he recovered somewhat and tried to get back to sea, he was put on the retired list. His health was permanently impaired and he died in 1948 at age of 65.

It was only the second convoy to be attacked by the new "wolfpack" tactics of German submarines. Some 20 of the 35 ships were sunk, including the commodore's ship. There is no sense that the disaster was in any way due to Mackinnon's efforts.

== Family ==
Mackinnon married Imogen Lorna Sayers Lee; they had two sons and two daughters.

== Character and reputation ==
Alan Burn in the Fighting Commodores describes Mackinnon as playing hard and working hard, and "... though a disciplinarian was popular at all levels."

== Sources ==
- Burn, Alan (1999). The Fighting Commodores. Annapolis: Naval Institute Press. pp. 76–90. ISBN 1-55750-283-8.
- Royal Navy (RN) Officers 1939-1945
