= SS Beatus =

British cargo steamship sunk during World War II

Coordinates: 57°31′N 13°10′W

History

United Kingdom
- Name: Beatus
- Owner: Tempus Shipping Co, Ltd
- Operator: W.H. Seager & Co Ltd
- Port of registry: Cardiff
- Builder: Ropner Shipbuilding & Repairing Co Ltd, Stockton-on-Tees
- Yard number: 548
- Launched: 23 January 1925
- Completed: March 1925
- Out of service: 18 October 1940
- Identification: code letters KSHC (until 1933); Call sign GFVX (1934–40); UK official number: 148281
- Fate: Sunk by torpedo, 18 October 1940

General characteristics
- Class & type: cargo steamship
- Tonnage: 4,885 GRT; tonnage under deck 4,610; 2,992 NRT
- Length: 390.0 feet (118.9 m) p/p
- Beam: 55.5 feet (16.9 m)
- Draught: 24 feet 6 3/4 inches (7.49 m)
- Depth: 26.4 feet (8.0 m)
- Installed power: 436 NHP
- Propulsion: triple-expansion steam engine; single screw
- Speed: 11 knots (20 km/h)
- Crew: 37
- Sensors & processing systems: wireless direction finding (by 1937)

SS Beatus was a British cargo steamship that was built in 1925, sailed in a number of transatlantic convoys in 1940 and was sunk by a U-boat that October.

== Building ==
Ropner Shipbuilding & Repairing Co Ltd of Stockton-on-Tees, England built Beatus, completing her in February 1925. She had nine corrugated furnaces with a combined grate area of 190 square feet (18 m^{2}) that heated three 180 lb_{f}/in^{2} single-ended boilers with a combined heating surface of 7,500 square feet (697 m^{2}). The boilers fed a three-cylinder triple expansion steam engine that was rated at 436 NHP and drove a single screw. The engine was built by Blair and Company, also of Stockton.

Beatus was registered in Cardiff, managed by W.H. Seager & Co Ltd and owned by another of William Seager's companies, Tempus Shipping Co, Ltd.

== Second World War career ==
By early 1940 Beatus was sailing in convoys. In February 1940 she joined Convoy SL 20 from Freetown, Sierra Leone to Liverpool with a cargo of wheat. In May and June 1940 she brought a general cargo across the North Atlantic to the UK via Bermuda, where she joined Convoy BHX 46. and Halifax, Nova Scotia, where BHX 46 joined Convoy HX 46. In late July Beatus was carrying a cargo of steel and pit props when she joined another HX convoy, HX 60, from Halifax, NS to Liverpool. Between ocean voyages, Beatus sailed in a number of North Sea coastal convoys.

== Convoy SC 7 and sinking ==
Early in October Beatus left Trois-Rivières, Quebec, carrying a cargo of 1,626 tons of steel, 5,874 tons of timber and a deck cargo of crated aircraft bound for Middlesbrough via the Tyne. She went via Sydney, Nova Scotia, where she joined Convoy SC 7 bound for Liverpool. SC 7 left Sydney on 5 October. At first the convoy had only one escort ship, the Hastings-class sloop HMS Scarborough. A wolfpack of U-boats found the convoy on 16 October and quickly overwhelmed it, sinking many ships over the next few days.

Between 2058 and 2104 hours on 18 October, SC 7 was about 100 miles (160 km) west by south of Barra Head in the Outer Hebrides when U-46, commanded by Oberleutnant zur See Engelbert Endrass, attacked it. Endrass fired four torpedoes: one hit and sank the Swedish freighter SS Convallaria; another hit Beatus. Frank Holding, Assistant Steward on Beatus, recalled:

"The next thing I heard was this explosion and a sound like breaking glass from down near the engine room. The ship stood still. When I went to the boat deck one of the lifeboats was already in the water, full of water... We knew we were sinking."

All 37 crew members were rescued by a convoy escort, the Flower-class corvette HMS Bluebell, and were later landed at Gourock.
