= SS Scoresby =

British cargo steamship

Coordinates: 59°14′N 17°51′W

- Scoresby

History

United Kingdom
- Name: Scoresby
- Owner: Rowland & Marwood's SS Co, Ltd
- Operator: Headlam & Son
- Port of registry: Whitby
- Builder: Robert Thompson & Sons Ltd, Bridge Dockyard, Sunderland
- Yard number: 316
- Launched: 18 December 1922
- Completed: January 1923
- Identification: UK official number: 137083; code letters KNMD (until 1933); Call sign GFZN (1934–40)
- Fate: sunk by torpedo, 17 October 1940

General characteristics
- Class & type: cargo steamship
- Tonnage: 3,843 GRT; 2,310 NRT
- Length: 360.1 ft (109.8 m) registered length
- Beam: 50.0 feet (15.2 m)
- Draught: 22 ft 6 3/4 in (6.88 m)
- Depth: 22.9 feet (7.0 m)
- Installed power: 340 NHP
- Propulsion: triple-expansion steam engine; single screw
- Speed: 8.5 knots (15.7 km/h)
- Crew: 39

SS Scoresby was a British cargo steamship that was built in 1923, sailed in a number of transatlantic convoys in 1940, and was sunk by a U-boat that October.

== Building ==
Robert Thompson & Sons Ltd of Bridge Dockyard, Sunderland built Scoresby. She was launched on 18 December 1922 and completed in January 1923.

Scoresby had eight corrugated furnaces with a combined grate area of 128 square feet (12 m^{2}) that heated two 180 lb_{f}/in^{2} single-ended boilers with a combined heating surface of 5,276 square feet (490 m^{2}). The boilers fed a three-cylinder triple expansion steam engine that was rated at 436 NHP and drove a single screw. The engine was built by the North Eastern Marine Engineering Co, Ltd, also of Sunderland.

Scoresby owner was Rowland and Marwood's Steam Ship Co, Ltd, who registered her in Whitby. She was managed by another Rowland and Marwood's company, Headlam & Sons.

== Second World War career ==
By January 1940 Beatus was sailing in convoys. That month she sailed from Liverpool with Convoy OB 77 as far as the coast of Canada, whence she continued to San Domingo. In March she returned to the UK with a convoy of sugar, sailing via Halifax, Nova Scotia where she joined Convoy HX 28 that reached Liverpool on 2 April.

In May 1940 Scoresby crossed the North Atlantic from Britain to Saint John, New Brunswick. She sailed with Convoy OA 150G from Southend, which merged with Convoy OA 150G off Land's End to form Convoy OG 30 to Gibraltar. In June she returned to the UK with a cargo of pit props, sailing via Halifax, Nova Scotia where she joined Convoy HX 53 that reached Liverpool on 10 July.

Scoresby spent the rest of July and August in home waters, sailing in short-haul convoys around Britain. Then on 31 August she sailed from Methil in Scotland with Convoy OA 207 to Canada.

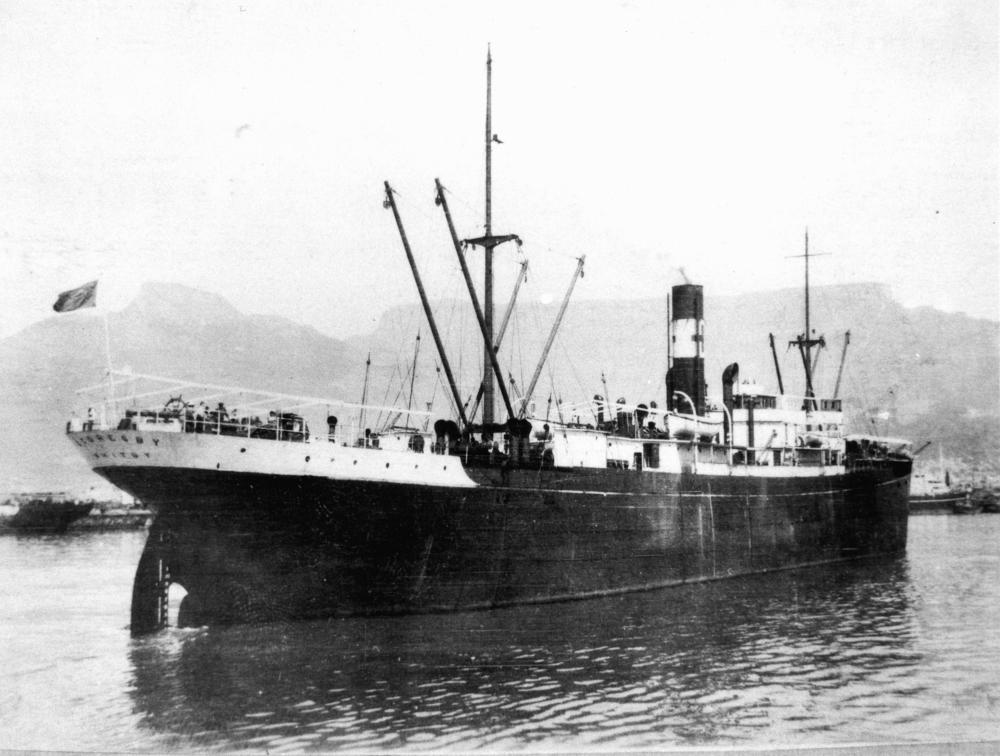
Scoresby in port

== Convoy SC 7 and sinking ==
Scoresby sailed from Corner Brook, Newfoundland with a cargo of 1,685 fathoms (3,082 m) of pit props bound for the Clyde in Scotland. She sailed via St. Francis Harbour, Nova Scotia and Sydney, Nova Scotia, where she joined Convoy SC 7. Her Master was Lawrence Zebedee Weatherill, and she carried the Convoy Vice-Commodore. SC 7 left Sydney on 5 October. At first the convoy had only one escort ship, the Hastings-class sloop HMS Scarborough. A wolf pack of U-boats found the convoy on 16 October and quickly overwhelmed it, sinking many ships over the next few days.

At 0553 hrs on 17 October SC 7 was about 160 nautical miles (300 km) northwest of Rockall when German submarine U-48, commanded by Kapitänleutnant Heinrich Bleichrodt, fired three torpedoes at the convoy. Two ships were hit and sunk: Scoresby and the French tanker Languedoc. Captain Weatherill and his entire crew successfully abandoned ship, were rescued by the Flower-class corvette HMS Bluebell, and on 20 October were landed at Gourock in Scotland.
