= Convoy SC 7 =

Convoy during naval battles of the Second World War

The Second World War
- Part of Convoy SC 7, the Battle of the Atlantic
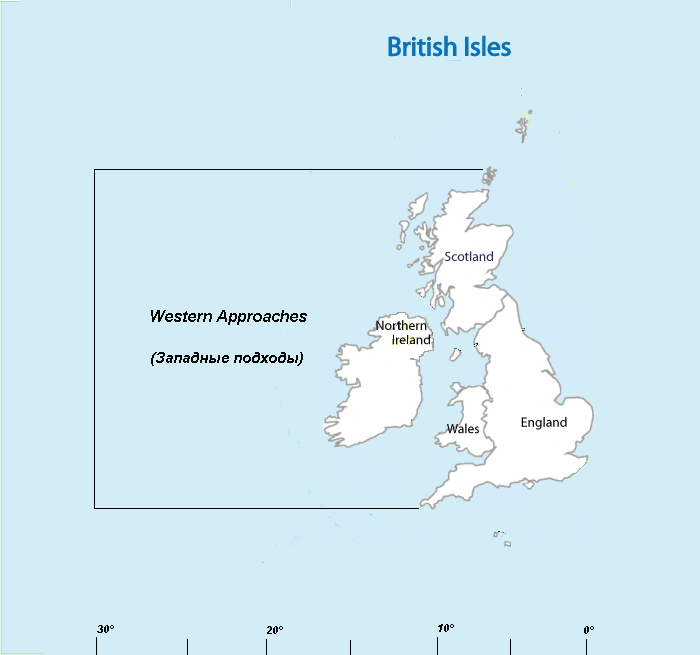
- Western Approaches of the British Isles
Date	16–19 October 1940
Location	Western Approaches
Result	German victory

Belligerents
Germany	United Kingdom

Commanders and leaders
Karl Dönitz	Lachlan Mackinnon

Strength
8 U-boats	35 ships; 5 escorts

Casualties and losses
None	142 men killed; 20 merchant ships sunk; 2 merchant ships damaged (79,592 gross register tons (GRT))

Convoy SC 7 was the name of a large Allied convoy in the Second World War comprising 35 merchant ships and six escorts. The convoy sailed eastwards from Sydney, Nova Scotia, for Liverpool and other British ports on 5 October 1940. While crossing the Atlantic, the convoy was attacked by one of the first U-boat wolfpacks. The escorts were overwhelmed, twenty of the 35 cargo vessels were sunk and two were damaged, with 141 lives lost. The disaster demonstrated the potency of wolfpacks (attacking in numbers) and the inadequacy of British anti-submarine operations.

== Ships of the convoy ==
The slow Convoy SC 7 left Sydney, Nova Scotia on 5 October 1940 bound for Liverpool and other British ports. The convoy was to make 8 kn (9.2 mph; 15 km/h) but several merchant ships were much slower, reducing its speed. The convoy consisted of older, smaller ships, mostly with cargoes of bulk goods. Much of the freight on these ships originated on Canada's east coast, especially from points to the north and east of Sydney. Typical cargoes included pit props from eastern New Brunswick for British coal mines, lumber, pulpwood, grain from the Great Lakes ports, steel and steel ingots from the Sydney plant and iron ore from Newfoundland, bound for the huge steel plants of Wales. The largest ship in the convoy was the 9,512 GRT oil tanker MV Languedoc, belonging to the Admiralty, which was bound for the Clyde with fuel for the Royal Navy. Another ship, the British SS Empire Brigade, carried a valuable cargo of trucks.

Many of the ships were British but the convoy included Greek, Swedish, Norwegian and Dutch vessels. The convoy commodore, Vice Admiral Lachlan Mackinnon, a retired naval officer who had volunteered for war service, sailed in SS Assyrian, a British ship of 2,962 GRT. Mackinnon was in charge of the good order of the merchant ships but did not command the escort. The Hastings-class sloop HMS Scarborough was sole naval escort for the first three quarters of the journey. There was no aircraft protection in 1940 for Allied ships in the Atlantic Ocean after leaving coastal regions. Scarborough would have had little chance against a surface attack by a German raider. Many of the merchant ship captains were resentful at having to sail in convoy and would have preferred to take their chances on their own, rather than risk such a slow crossing with a weak escort. They were often uncooperative; at one point early in the voyage Scarborough's captain was shocked to find a Greek merchant ship in the convoy travelling at night with her lights on.

== Battle ==
=== 5–18 October ===
The convoy sailed on Saturday 5 October 1940. On the first day Winona dropped out with mechanical trouble and returned to port. The convoy "ran into a gale" on 8 October and then were engaged by U-boats. As bad weather set in on 11 October, several ships became separated and were forced to sail independently. Trevisa, was a small Canadian Laker of 1,813 GRT, with a cargo of lumber destined for Scotland, that was sighted by U-124 on 16 October and sunk. The Greek freighter Aenos was seen by U-38 and sunk on the 17 October but Eaglescliffe Hall, another Laker, rescued survivors from Aenos, before arriving at Rothesay on 19 October. A fourth straggler regained the convoy on 15 October.

On 17 October, as the convoy entered the Western Approaches; Scarborough was joined by the sloop Fowey and the new corvette Bluebell. Later that day they were sighted by U-48, which attacked, sinking two ships, including the tanker Languedoc. Scarborough drove U-48 deep so she was unable to shadow or report but the attack continued for too long and the convoy moved so far ahead that Scarborough was unable to rejoin. On 18 October, Convoy SC 7 was joined by the sloop Leith and the corvette Heartsease, with Leith assuming command. Later that day, U-38 sighted the convoy and attacked, damaging Carsbreck. Leith and Heartsease attacked without success, though U-38 was driven off and Heartsease was detailed to escort Carsbreck home, weakening the escort further.

=== 18/19 October ===
On the night of 18/19 October, the convoy was attacked by U-46, U-99 (Korvettenkapitän Otto Kretschmer) U-100 (Korvettenkapitän Joachim Schepke), U-101 and U-123. The attack was coordinated from Lorient by Admiral Karl Dönitz the Befehlshaber der U-Boote (Commander, U-boats) and his staff. Creekirk, bound for Cardiff, was sunk with all 36 hands. Later that night, Convoy SC 7 lost Empire Brigade with her cargo of trucks and six of her crew and Fiscus carrying steel ingots from Sydney with the loss of 38 of the 39 crew. The convoy commodore's ship, Assyrian was sunk with 17 of the crew being killed (Mackinnon was rescued after a long immersion in the water). Sixteen ships were sunk in six hours.

=== 18–20 October ===
On 18 October, Blairspey was torpedoed by U-101 and abandoned. On 19 October U-100 torpedoed it again but it remained afloat. She was towed to the Clyde and later repaired at Greenock. The escorts' anti-submarine efforts were uncoordinated and ineffective. They never realised that the attacking submarines did not attack submerged or from outside the convoy but were running on the surface inside the convoy. The escorts were unable to mount any serious attacks on the U-boats and spent much of their time rescuing survivors. During 19 October, the escorts, loaded with survivors, gathered together those ships that remained. Fowey collected eight ships and made for the Clyde, arriving there a few days later. Scarborough passed through the scene of the battle later on 19 October; she found wreckage, but no survivors. Later that afternoon Leith met Heartsease, still escorting the damaged Carsbreck; together they headed for Gourock, Renfrewshire, collecting two more stragglers on the way. Bluebell with over 200 survivors on board, headed directly for the Clyde, arriving on 20 October.

== Aftermath ==
SC 7 had lost 20 ships out of 35, six being sunk by U-99, a loss of 79,592 GRT. The arrival of Convoy HX 79 in the vicinity had diverted the U-boats and they sank twelve ships from that convoy during the night. No U-boats were lost in either engagement. The sinking of 28 ships in 48 hours made 18 and 19 October the worst two days for shipping losses in the Atlantic campaign of the war. The attack on Convoy SC 7 was a vindication of the U-boat wolfpack tactic and was the most successful U-boat attack of the Atlantic campaign. Convoy tactics were rudimentary at this early stage of the war. The escorts' responses were uncoordinated, as the ships were unused to working together with a common battle plan. Command fell to the senior officer present and could change as a ship arrived.

The escorts were torn between staying with the convoy, abandoning survivors in the water, as Defensively Equipped Merchant Ships (DEMS) regulations demanded and picking them up, leaving the convoy unprotected and risking being torpedoed. In the German semi-official history, Germany and the Second World War (2015), Bernd Stegemann wrote that the U-boats had their best success per-day-at-sea in October 1940. During the winter of 1940–1941 the U-boats had less success due to the seasonal weather, the British–US destroyers-for-bases deal, the arrival of the first corvettes, the addition of radar sets and radio-telephones to British destroyers and the slow increase in the number of Coastal Command aircraft.

== Merchant ships ==
Convoyed ships
Ship	Year	Flag	GRT	Notes
Aenos	1910	Greece	3,554	Sunk, 17 October, U-38, 59°N, 13°W, 4† 25 surv
Assyrian	1914	Merchant Navy	2,962	Convoy commodore, sunk, 19 October, U-101, 57°12′N, 10°43′W, 17† 31 surv.
Beatus	1925	Merchant Navy	4,885	Sunk, 18 October, U-46, 57°31′N, 13°10′W, 0† 37 surv.
Blairspey	1929	Merchant Navy	4,155	Damaged, 18 October, U-101, 19 October U-100, 0†
Boekelo	1930	Netherlands	2,118	Damaged, 18 October, U-100, sunk, 19 October, U-123, 56°40′N, 10°45′W, 0†
Botusk	1919	Merchant Navy	3,091	
Carsbreck	1930	Merchant Navy	3,670	Damaged, 18 October, U-38, towed to port
Clintonia	1917	Merchant Navy	3,106	Damaged, 19 October, U-99, sunk, U-123, 57°10′N, 11°20′W, 1† 34 surv
SS Convallaria	1921	Sweden	1,996	Sunk, 18 October, U-46, 57°20′N, 10°40′W, 0†
Corinthic	1924	Merchant Navy	4,823	
Creekirk	1912	Merchant Navy	3,917	Sunk, 18 October, U-101, 57°30′M, 11°10′W, 36†
Dioni	1906	Greece	4,181	
Eaglescliffe Hall	1928	Merchant Navy	1,900	
Empire Brigade	1912	Merchant Navy	5,154	Sunk, 19 October, U-99
Empire Miniver	1918	Merchant Navy	6,055	Sunk, 19 October, U-99
Fiscus	1928	Merchant Navy	4,815	Straggler, sunk, 18 October, U-99, 57°29′N, 11°10′W, 38† 1 surv
Flynderborg	1930	Merchant Navy	1,999	
SS Gunborg	1930	Sweden	1,572	Sunk, 18 October, U-46, 57°14′N, 10°38′W, 23 surv
Havørn	1902	Norway	1,527	
Inger Elisabeth	1920	Norway	2,166	
Karlander	1914	Norway	1,843	
Languedoc	1937	Merchant Navy	9,512	Tanker, damaged, 17 October, U-48, sank 18 October, 59°14′N, 17°51′W, 41 surv
SS Niritos	1907	Greece	3,854	Sunk, 18 October, U-99, 57°14′N, 10°38′W, 1† 27 surv
Scoresby	1923	Merchant Navy	3,843	Sunk, 17 October, U-48, 59°14′N, 17°51′W, 0†
SS Sedgepool	1918	Merchant Navy	5,556	Sunk, 19 October, U-123, 57°20′N, 11°22′W, 3† 36 surv
SS Shekatika	1936	Merchant Navy	5,458	Damaged, U-123, U-100, 19 October, sunk, U-123, 57°12′N, 11°08′W, 36 surv.
Snefjeld	1901	Norway	1,644	Sunk, 19 October, U-99, 57°28′N, 11°10′W 0†
Sneland I	1922	Norway	1,791	
Soesterberg	1927	Netherlands	1,904	Sunk, 19 October, U-101
Somersby	1930	Merchant Navy	5,170	
SS Thalia	1917	Greece	5,875	Sunk, 19 October, U-99
Thorøy	1893	Norway	2,671	
SS Trevisa	1915	Canada	1,813	Sunk, 16 October, U-124
Trident	1917	Merchant Navy	4,317	
Valparaiso	1917	Sweden	3,759	
Winona	1919	United States	6,197	Turned back

== See also ==
- Battle of the Atlantic

== Sources ==
- Jordan, Roger W. (2006) [1999]. The World's Merchant Fleets 1939: The Particulars and Wartime Fates of 6,000 Ships (2nd ed.). London: Chatham/Lionel Leventhal. ISBN 978-1-86176-293-1.
- Keegan, John (2002). Intelligence In War. ISBN 0-375-70046-3.
- Lund, Paul; Ludlam, Harry (1973). The Night of the U-Boats. ISBN 0-450-01833-4.
- Maier, Klaus A.; Rohde, Horst; Stegemann, Bernd; Umbreit, Hans (2015) [1991]. Falla, P. S. (ed.). Germany and the Second World War: Germany's Initial Conquests in Europe. Vol. II. Translated by McMurry, Dean S.; Osers, Ewald (trans. pbk. Clarendon Press, Oxford ed.). Freiburg im Breisgau: Militärgeschichtliches Forschungsamt [Research Institute for Military History]. ISBN 978-0-19-873834-3.
  - Stegemann, Bernd. "Part VI The Battle for Hegemony in Western Europe. Part VIII The Second Phase of the War at Sea (until the Spring of 1941) I. The Submarine War". In Maier et al. (2015).
- Rohwer, Jürgen; Hümmelchen, Gerhard (2005). Chronology of the War at Sea 1939–1945: The Naval History of World War Two (3rd rev. ed.). Annapolis, Maryland: Naval Institute Press. ISBN 1-59114-119-2.
- Sawyer, L. A.; Mitchell, W. H. (1995). The Empire Ships. London: Lloyd's of London Press. ISBN 1-85044-275-4.
