= SS Blairspey =

History

United Kingdom, Lebanon
- Name: Blairspey (1929–42, 1942–61)
- Owner: Northern Navigation Co Ltd (1929–42); Ministry of War Transport (1942–46)
- Operator: George Nisbet & Co, Glasgow (1929–61)
- Port of registry: (United Kingdom) Glasgow (1929–61) (Lebanon) (1961–67)
- Builder: Ardrossan Dry Dock & Shipbuilding Co Ltd, Ardrossan
- Yard number: 344
- Launched: 5 September 1929
- Completed: October 1929
- Renamed: Empire Spey in 1942; Blairspey in 1946; Evandros in 1961
- Identification: UK official number 161892; code letters LFBD (until 1933); Call sign GNZD (1934–61)
- Fate: scrapped May 1967

General characteristics
- Type: Cargo steamship
- Tonnage: 1929–40: 4,155 GRT; tonnage under deck 3,690; 2,522 NRT; 1942–67: 4,292 GRT; tonnage under deck 3,690; 2,551 NRT
- Length: 371.8 feet (113.3 m)
- Beam: 51.2 feet (15.6 m)
- Depth: 24.3 feet (7.4 m)
- Installed power: 257 NHP
- Propulsion: triple-expansion steam engine; single screw
- Crew: 34

SS Blairspey was a steam cargo ship that was built in Scotland in 1929 and served in the Battle of the Atlantic in the Second World War. In 1940 she survived being part of Convoy SC 7 and managed to reach port, despite being hit by at least three torpedoes from two different U-boats. The ship was rebuilt with a new bow and renamed Empire Spey 1942. Her original name was restored in 1946. She was renamed Evandros 1961 and scrapped in Italy in 1967.

== Building ==
Blairspey was built by the Ardrossan Dry Dock and Shipbuilding Co Ltd of Ardrossan, Ayrshire, Scotland. She was launched on 5 September 1929 and completed in October 1929. She was powered by a three-cylinder triple-expansion steam engine rated at 257 NHP.

Blairspey was built her Northern Navigation Co Ltd, who registered her in Glasgow and appointed George Nisbet and Company to manage her.

== Convoy SC 7 ==
In October 1940 she loaded timber at Rimouski, Quebec and sailed to Sydney, Nova Scotia, where she joined Convoy SC 7 bound for Liverpool. Blairspey's cargo was bound for Grangemouth on the Firth of Forth, Scotland. On 5 October the convoy left Sydney, initially with only one escort ship, the Hastings-class sloop HMS Scarborough. On 16 October a wolf pack of U-boats found the convoy and quickly overwhelmed it, sinking many ships over the next few days.

At 2308 hours on 18 October U-101 commanded by Kapitänleutnant Fritz Frauenheim attacked the convoy east-northeast of Rockall. He fired a number of torpedoes and claimed to have sunk two 9,500 ton ships, and damaged a third which he estimated at 6,000 tons. Allied records show that only the Blairspey had been hit, and she had survived at least one and possibly two torpedoes. Heavily damaged but still afloat she began to fall behind the convoy. At 0250 hours on 19 October U-100, commanded by Kapitänleutnant Joachim Schepke, sighted Blairspey and hit her with another two torpedoes. Her cargo of timber kept her afloat, despite a badly damaged bow. She was taken in tow and eventually managed to reach Scotland. She was beached in the Clyde on 25 October.

== Repair and later career ==
The Ministry of War Transport (MoWT) had Blairspey repaired. Lithgows of Port Glasgow built her a new bow, which was launched on 16 February 1942. The damaged section was removed during periods in the Garvel Drydock, Greenock, and the stern and new fore part were joined in the same drydock between 17 February 1942 and 19 March 1942. The rebuild increased the ship's gross register tonnage by 137 tons and her net register tonnage by 29 tons. The MoWT took her over, renamed her Empire Spey, and appointed George Nisbet and Company to continue to manage her.

Empire Spey served in three more transatlantic convoys from Sydney to Liverpool. In May and June 1942 carrying a cargo of steel and timber she sailed in Convoy SC 85. In November and December 1942 she carried another cargo of steel and timber and sailed in Convoy SC 110. In April 1943 she carried steel and general cargo and sailed in Convoy SC 126.

In 1946 the MoWT returned the ship to her owners, who restored her original name. They sold her on, and she spent several years as a tramp steamer. By 1961 she was owned by a number of London-based Greeks, who had renamed her Evandros and registered her in Lebanon. In May 1967 she was scrapped at La Spezia, Italy.
