= SS Flynderborg =

Several steamships have borne the name Flynderborg, after the fortress in Denmark:

- SS Flynderborg was a 1,387-ton cargo ship launched on 26 September 1901, by Helsingør Værft, Helsingør, Denmark. Torpedoed and sunk on 21 October 1917.
- SS Flynderborg was a 1,417-ton cargo ship launched on 17 June 1919, by Helsingør Værft, Helsingør, Denmark. Wrecked on 13 March 1930.
- SS Flynderborg was a 1,999-ton passenger/cargo ship launched on 29 April 1930, by W. Gray & Co Ltd, West Hartlepool, England. Torpedoed and sunk on 3 November 1941.
- SS Flynderborg was a 2,342-ton passenger/cargo ship launched on 29 July 1949, by W. Gray & Co Ltd, West Hartlepool, England. Scrapped in 1972.
