= SS Aenos (1910) =

British-built cargo steamship, 1910–1940

Coordinates: 59°0′N 13°0′W

History
- Name: Cedar Branch (1910–30); Aenos (1930–40)
- Owner: Nautilus SS Co (until 1930); A Lusi (1931–37); "Zephyros" SS Co Ltd, Argostoli (1937–40)
- Operator: F&W Ritson (until 1930)
- Port of registry: (United Kingdom) Sunderland (Greece) Argostoli
- Builder: Bartram & Sons Ltd, South Dock, Sunderland
- Launched: 21 June 1910
- Completed: 1910
- In service: 1910
- Out of service: 17 October 1940
- Renamed: launched as Cedar Branch; renamed Aenos in 1930
- Identification: UK official number 123970; code letters HRNF (until 1930); Code letters JHWL (1932–33); Call sign SVGI (1934–40)
- Fate: Sunk by torpedo, 17 October 1940

General characteristics
- Type: Sail and steam cargo ship (until 1931); Cargo steamship (1932–40)
- Tonnage: 3,554 GRT; tonnage under deck 3,318; 2,222 NRT
- Length: 390.5 feet (119.0 m)
- Beam: 51.0 feet (15.5 m)
- Depth: 21.3 feet (6.5 m)
- Installed power: 434 NHP
- Propulsion: triple-expansion steam engine; single screw
- Sail plan: 3-masted schooner (until 1930)
- Crew: 29

SS Aenos, formerly SS Cedar Branch, was a British-built cargo steamship. She was completed in England in 1910 and sunk in the Battle of the Atlantic in 1940.

== As Cedar Branch ==
Bartram & Sons Ltd of South Dock, Sunderland built the ship, completing her as Cedar Branch in 1910. She was a three-masted schooner that also had a triple-expansion steam engine. By 1932 Lloyd's Register no longer listed her as a schooner, suggesting that by that time her rigging and sails had been removed, her masts had been reduced in height (see photo) and she ran solely under steam power.

== As Aenos ==
In her 30-year career the ship passed through various owners and more than one manager. In 1930 she belonged to Nautilus Steam Shipping Co and was registered in Sunderland, but then she was sold to A. Lusi, who changed her name from Cedar Branch to Aenos and registered her in the port of Argostoli in Cephalonia. In about 1936–37 her owner changed to "Zephyros" Steam Ship Company Ltd, but she continued to be registered in Argostoli.

In October 1940 Aenos loaded a cargo of 6,276 tons of wheat at Sorel in Canada to take to Manchester, England. Her Master was Dionisios Laskaratos. She sailed from Sorel to Sydney, Nova Scotia where she joined Convoy SC 7 which was to take her as far as Liverpool. SC 7 left Sydney on 5 October 1940, initially with only one escort ship, the Hastings-class sloop HMS Scarborough. A wolf pack of U-boats found the convoy on 16 October and quickly overwhelmed it, sinking many ships over the next few days.

Aenos was straggling behind the main convoy and first to be sunk. On the morning of 17 October she was about 80 nautical miles (150 km) north-northeast of Rockall when the German submarine U-38 sighted her, fired one G7e torpedo at her at 0957 hrs but it missed. The submarine then surfaced and fired on Aenos with her 105 mm deck gun until the ship sank at 1052 hours. Out of a complement of 29, four crew members were killed. Another straggler, the Canadian cargo ship Eaglescliffe Hall, rescued 25 survivors including Captain Laskaratos, and landed them at Gourock in Scotland the next day.
