= Aenos =

Aenos may refer to

- the ancient city of Ainos in Thrace, today's Enez
- Mount Ainos, a mountain on the island Cephalonia, Greece
- SS Aenos, a number of ships with this name
