= French ship Languedoc =

At least three ships of the French Navy have been named Languedoc:

- French ship Languedoc (1766), a Saint-Esprit-class ship of the line launched in 1766, renamed Anti-fédéraliste and then Victore she was broken up in 1799.
- French battleship Languedoc, an uncompleted Normandie-class ship, launched in 1916.
- French frigate Languedoc, an Aquitaine-class frigate launched in 2014.

Furthermore, there was at least one other ship by that name sailing under French flag:

- MV Languedoc, a French oil tanker built in 1937 and sunk in 1940.
