= Boukékoum =

Coordinates: 13.0356°N 15.9314°W

- Interactive map of Boukékoum
- Country: Senegal
- Time zone: UTC+0 (GMT)

Boukékoum is a settlement in Senegal.
