= SS Aenos =

A number of steamships have been named Aenos, including:

- SS Aenos (1910)
- SS Aenos (1944)
