= SS Thorøy =

History

Norway
- Name: SS Thorøy
- Operator: Bryde & Dahls Hvalfangerselskap A/S
- Builder: Newcastle upon Tyne
- Launched: 25 October 1893
- Completed: 1893
- Renamed: Snowflake until 1913; Kremlin until 1922; Velløy until 1925; Thorøy until 1947; Anne de France
- Fate: Scrapped 12 January 1953

General characteristics
- Class & type: Steam merchant ship
- Tonnage: 2,671 grt

The SS Thorøy was a Norwegian steam merchant ship. She had an eventful life, surviving the First World War and going on to see action during the Second World War. During the latter conflict she sailed in a number of convoys, surviving air and "wolfpack" attacks.

== Career ==
Thorøy was built in Newcastle upon Tyne in 1893, initially sailing under the name Snowflake. She was renamed Kremlin in 1913 and then Velløy in 1922. She was bought on 24 August 1925 by Bryde & Dahls Hvalfangerselskap A/S and renamed Thorøy. She survived in allied hands after the German invasion of Norway in April 1940, and was soon pressed into service to bring supplies to the UK. She often travelled in convoy to lessen the risk of attacks by German U-boats. Her first convoy was as part of OA 169, which sailed from Southend on 17 June 1941. The convoy reached its dispersion point on 19 June and Thorøy made her way to Falmouth.

In October she was involved in a transatlantic convoy, SC 7. She left Sydney, Nova Scotia on 5 October bound for UK ports with a cargo of fuel oil. The convoy was attacked and its escorts overwhelmed during its crossing by a number of U-boats utilising "wolfpack" tactics. Thorøy was one of the few to make it to port unscathed. She spent most of the rest of the war travelling in short distance convoys between Milford Haven and Portsmouth, carrying fuel from the refineries at Milford Haven to the naval base at Portsmouth. She was at Avonmouth on 17 January 1941 when the port came under air attack. Thorøy was hit and damaged by a bomb, but was later repaired and returned to service. She survived the war and was sold on 8 April 1947 to Laurent Reboul & Gabriel Couteaux, of Istanbul, and was renamed Anne de France.
