= SS Corinthic (1924) =

British cargo ship involved in World War II

Coordinates: 8°10′N 14°40′W

History

United Kingdom
- Name: Corinthic
- Owner: W.H. Cockerline & Co
- Port of registry: Hull
- Builder: Irvine's Shipbuilding & Dry Dock Co Ltd, Middleton Shipyard, West Hartlepool
- Yard number: 617
- Completed: June 1924
- Out of service: 13 April 1941
- Identification: code letters KQWB (until 1933); Call sign GKNW (1934–41); UK official number 147155
- Fate: Torpedoed and sunk on 13 April 1941

General characteristics
- Class & type: cargo steamship
- Tonnage: 4,823 GRT; tonnage under deck 4,513; 3,023 NRT
- Length: 390.1 feet (118.9 m) p/p
- Beam: 55.5 feet (16.9 m)
- Draught: 24 feet 4 1/2 inches (7.43 m)
- Depth: 26.2 feet (8.0 m)
- Installed power: 442 NHP
- Propulsion: triple-expansion steam engine; single screw
- Crew: 39 + two DEMS gunners (1941)

SS Corinthic was a British cargo steamship. She was built on Teesside in 1924, sailed in a number of convoys in the Second World War, survived an overwhelming German attack on Convoy SC 7 October 1940, but was sunk by a German U-boat off West Africa in April 1941.

== Early career ==
Irvine's Shipbuilding and Dry Dock Co Ltd of Middleton Shipyard, West Hartlepool built Corinthic for W.H. Cockerline & Co, who registered her in Hull. She was launched in 1924 and completed in June of that year. The ship had nine corrugated furnaces with a combined grate area of 182 square feet (17 m^{2}) heating three 180 lb_{f}/in^{2} single-ended boilers with a combined heating surface of 7,551 square feet (702 m^{2}). The boilers fed a three-cylinder triple expansion steam engine built by Richardsons Westgarth & Company of West Hartlepool that was rated at 442 NHP and drove a single screw.

== World War II service ==
In the Second World War Corinthic sailed in convoys for protection against German naval and air attacks. She was part of Convoy SC 7, which sailed from Sydney, Nova Scotia for Liverpool on 5 October 1940. The convoy was overwhelmed by U-boats in a wolfpack attack, losing 20 out of its 35 merchant ships. Corinthic, carrying a cargo of steel and scrap metal, was one of the minority that survived.

== Sinking ==
Early in 1941 Corinthic left the river port of Rosario in northern Argentina with Captain Townson Ridley as her Master and carrying a cargo of 7,710 tons of grain. On 13 April 1941 she was southwest of Freetown in Sierra Leone, West Africa, when German submarine U-124, commanded by Kapitänleutnant Georg-Wilhelm Schulz, hit her with one torpedo at 2229 hours. The damage stopped her but she did not sink, so Schulz fired a second torpedo at 2244 hrs. This was a dud, so at 2254 hrs he fired a third torpedo, after which Corinthic sank and two members of her crew were killed. Captain Ridley, 36 officers and men and two DEMS gunners successfully abandoned ship. The Dutch motor tanker Malvina rescued them and landed them at Freetown.
