= SS Eaglescliffe Hall =

Freight vessel

History

Canada/United Kingdom
- Name: SS Eaglescliffe Hall
- Operator: Hall Corp. of Canada
- Builder: Smiths Dock Company, South Bank, Middlesbrough
- Launched: 5 April 1928
- Completed: 1928
- Renamed: Renamed David Barclay in 1955
- Fate: Sunk, 25 October 1961

General characteristics
- Type: Bulk freighter
- Tonnage: 1,900 tons
- Length: 253 ft
- Beam: 43 ft
- Height: 20 ft
- Propulsion: Triple expansion engine

The SS Eaglescliffe Hall was a bulk freighter initially built to serve the Canadians on the Great Lakes. She left the lakes during the Second World War to transport goods around Britain, but returned in 1959. She sank off the west Coast of Canada in 1961 after conversion to a log barge.

== Pre-war service ==
The Eaglescliffe Hall was built in 1928 at the yards of Smiths Dock Company, South Bank, Middlesbrough. She was sailed across the Atlantic to enter service with Hall Corporation, based in Canada.

== World War II service ==
On the outbreak of war she was fitted to cross the Atlantic to support the merchant navy in British waters. She joined the ill-fated convoy SC 7 which sailed from Sydney, Nova Scotia on 5 October 1940. She was carrying a cargo of timber. The poorly escorted convoy came under heavy U-boat attack, and a number of the ships were sunk. Eaglescliffe Hall was straggling behind the main convoy and was able to pick up survivors from the torpedoed Greek merchant SS Aenos. She safely reached port.

She was soon busy on a number of local convoys, including trips from Seaham to London, carrying coal for the London power stations. Whilst at anchor off Sunderland on 10 August 1941 the Eaglescliffe Hall was attacked by German bombers. One bomb fell into the hold but did not detonate, the second hit the side and fell into the water. A third bomb struck the engine room, killing two people, including the chief engineer, and wounding several others. The Eaglescliffe Hall was towed to Sunderland on 13 August and from there to the Tyne on 20 August for repairs. Eaglescliffe Hall again found herself in trouble later that year, when the Sheringham lifeboat Foresters' Centenary had to rescue 15 men from her on 29–30 October 1941. The lifeboat's coxwain, a man named Dumble, was awarded the RNLI's Bronze Medal for the rescue.

== Post-war service ==
Eaglescliffe Hall remained in service, and in 1955 was sold to Colonial Steamships Ltd, where she was renamed David Barclay.

David Barclay was sold to Scott Misener of Canada in 1959 and returned to service on the Great Lakes for two years.

She was sold to Kingcome Navigation Ltd., Vancouver in 1961 and was converted to a log barge. She sank later that year whilst under tow in waters off British Columbia on 25 October 1961.
