= MV Languedoc =

World War II-era motor tanker

Coordinates: 59°14′N 17°51′W

History

Panama
- Name: Actor
- Owner: Neptune Shipping Limitada SA, Panama
- Port of registry: Panama
- Builder: Burmeister & Wain's Maskin & Skibsbyggeri A/S, Copenhagen
- Yard number: 627
- Launched: 14 July 1937
- Completed: September 1937
- Fate: Sold to France 1938

France
- Name: Languedoc
- Operator: Société Française de Transports Pétrolièrs (SFTP), Paris
- Port of registry: Le Havre
- Out of service: Seized by Britain in 1940

United Kingdom
- Name: Languedoc
- Owner: Ministry of War Transport, London
- Operator: John I. Jacobs & Co Ltd, London
- Port of registry: Trinidad
- Fate: Sunk on 17 October 1940

General characteristics
- Class & type: Motor tanker
- Tonnage: 9,512 GRT
- Crew: 39

MV Languedoc was a motor tanker that sailed under the French flag until World War II. She was taken over by the UK after the fall of France in 1940, sailed in a number of convoys, and was sunk by a German U-boat later that year.

== Early career ==
Languedoc was built in 1937 by Burmeister & Wain's Maskin & Skibsbyggeri A/S, of Copenhagen as MV Actor. She entered service with Société Française de Transports Pétrolièrs (SFTP), Paris in 1938 and was renamed Languedoc. On the outbreak of war she sailed in a number of short convoys from Verdon to Casablanca carrying fuel, as well as sailing from Halifax, Nova Scotia to Liverpool in September 1939. She was part of Convoy KS-74 in March 1940, sailing from Casablanca to Brest. This was her last convoy under the French flag. After the fall of France she was seized by the UK, whose Ministry of War Transport contracted John I. Jacobs & Co Ltd of London to manage her. She was registered in Trinidad but her homeport was London.

== SC 7 ==
Her first and last convoy under the British flag was as part of Convoy SC 7. She sailed from Trinidad for Sydney, Nova Scotia to join the convoy assembling there, and left with the convoy on 5 October. She was bound for the Clyde under the command of her master, John Thomson, and carrying a cargo of 13,700 tons of fuel oil. The convoy was overwhelmed by a wolf pack of U-boats and many of the cargo ships were sunk. Languedoc was an early loss. She was sighted by U-48 under the command of Heinrich Bleichrodt, who fired three torpedoes at three ships of the convoy at 0553 hours on 17 October as they passed 160 miles northwest of Rockall. He reported two ships sunk and a third damaged. In fact, only Languedoc and Scoresby were hit, by one torpedo each, and both were sunk. The master and 38 crew members abandoned ship, and were picked up by the escorting Flower-class corvette HMS Bluebell. The damaged Languedoc was assessed and decided to be beyond salvage. Bluebell scuttled her with gunfire and landed the survivors at Gourock on 20 October. There were no casualties.
