= SS Flynderborg (1930) =

Merchant ship

Coordinates: 51°21′N 51°45′W

History

Denmark
- Name: Flynderborg
- Operator: C.K. Hansen, Copenhagen
- Builder: W. Gray & Co Ltd, West Hartlepool
- Launched: 29 April 1930
- Completed: 1930
- Out of service: Taken over by the British on 22 August 1940; Transferred to the Ministry of War Transport

United Kingdom
- Name: Flynderborg
- Operator: Hall Brothers, Newcastle-upon-Tyne
- Acquired: 22 August 1940
- Fate: Sunk on 3 November 1941

General characteristics
- Class & type: Steam merchant ship
- Tonnage: 2,022 tons
- Crew: 24

SS Flynderborg was a Danish steam merchant ship. She was taken over after the fall of Denmark during the Second World War, and sailed under the British flag. She sailed in a number of convoys before being sunk whilst carrying supplies to the UK in 1941.

== Early career ==
Flynderborg was built by W. Gray & Co Ltd, of West Hartlepool in 1930 for the Danish firm C.K. Hansen, of Copenhagen. After the German invasion of Denmark in 1940 she was seized by the British on 22 August and transferred to the Ministry of War Transport. She retained her original name but was operated for the Ministry by Hall Brothers, of Newcastle upon Tyne. She served in a number of convoys, initially between UK ports, but then moved to transatlantic crossings. She was part of the ill-fated convoy SC 7, but was one of the few merchants to safely reach port in the UK.

== Sinking ==
She continued to take part in the convoys. Her last one was with convoy SC 52 under the command of her master P. Petersen. She arrived at the assembly point at Sydney, Nova Scotia from Parrsboro, Nova Scotia, sailing from Sydney on 29 October 1941 bound for London with a cargo of 2,125 tons of lumber. During the crossing the convoy was sighted northeast of Notre Dame Bay, Newfoundland by U-202 on 3 November. She launched a number of torpedoes at 04.54, 04.58 and 05:05 hours, and observed hits on two ships and heard a third strike a target. Flynderborg and Gretavale had been hit and sunk. U-202 went on to sink a capsized wreck with a coup de grâce at 08:44 hours, which may have been either Flynderborg or Gretavale. Three crew members were lost with Flynderborg whilst the master, 18 crew members and two gunners were picked up by the Flower-class corvette HMCS Windflower and were landed at St. John's.
