= HMS Fowey (L15) =

Sloop of the Royal Navy

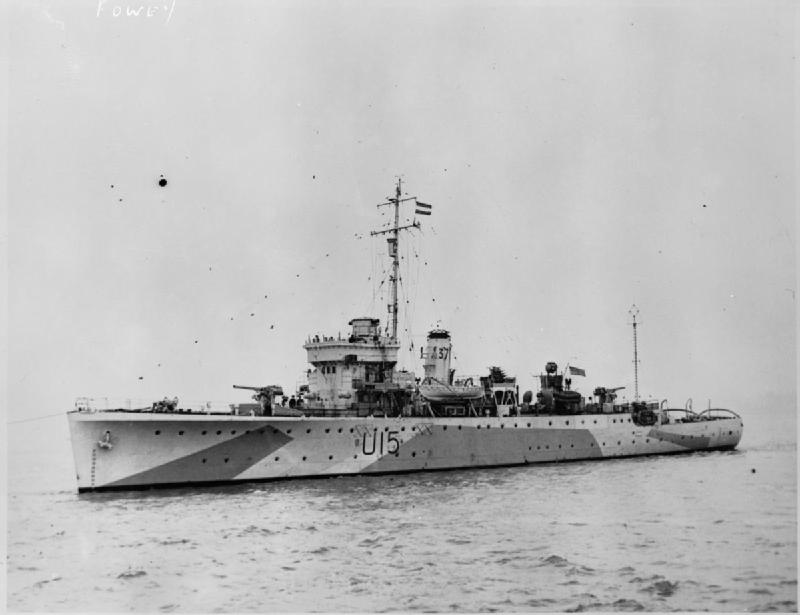

History

United Kingdom
- Name: HMS Fowey
- Ordered: 4 December 1929
- Builder: Devonport Dockyard
- Laid down: 24 March 1930
- Launched: 4 November 1930
- Commissioned: 11 September 1931
- Identification: Pennant number: L15 (later U15)
- Motto: Tien te foy : 'Hold thy loyalty'
- Fate: Sold into merchant service in October 1946; Scrapped in 1950
- Badge: On a Field Blue, a ship Gold with White sails bearing a cross Red over wavelets Silver and Green.

General characteristics
- Class & type: Shoreham-class sloop
- Displacement: 1,150 tons
- Length: 281 ft (86 m)
- Beam: 35 ft (11 m)
- Draught: 8 ft 3 in (2.51 m)
- Propulsion: Geared turbines; two shafts; 2,000 shp (1,500 kW)
- Speed: 16 knots (30 km/h)
- Complement: 95
- Armament: 2 × QF 4-inch (101.6 mm) Mk V guns (2×1); 4 .5" MG A/A (1×4)

HMS Fowey was a Shoreham-class sloop of the Royal Navy. She served during the Second World War.

== Construction and commissioning ==
Fowey was ordered on 4 December 1929, under the 1929 Programme. She was laid down at Devonport Dockyard on 24 March 1930, and was launched on 4 November that year by a Mrs Treffery. She was commissioned on 11 September 1931 and was initially manned by the Devonport Port Division. She was then assigned to the Persian Gulf and served there until August 1939. She then spent a period under repair at Bombay, before being manned by the Portsmouth Port Division. She was adopted by the civil community of Wincanton, Somerset in March 1942, following a successful Warship Week National Savings campaign.

== Wartime career ==
=== Early duties and successes ===
Fowey was transferred to serve in the Mediterranean on 9 September after her repairs had been completed. By October she was engaged on contraband patrols, before being transferred to Freetown to join Atlantic convoy defence efforts. She sailed for Freetown in November and was deployed on her first convoy on 2 December, escorting Convoy SL 11 to the UK. She was detached from the convoy on 18 December and sailed for Southampton. On arrival she began a refit in a commercial shipyard. Upon her return to service in January, Fowey was nominated to serve with Western Approaches Command, and deployed out of Plymouth on convoy escort duties. Her first success came on 30 January, when she took part in the sinking of U-55, together with HMS Whitshed and RAF aircraft from No. 228 Squadron. The U-55 had attacked a convoy south west of the Isles of Scilly, sinking two ships but was sunk herself with only one of her crew lost.

=== Escorting the Atlantic convoys ===
Fowey remained on the Western Approaches throughout February and into March. On 14 March she was deployed with her sister HMS Bideford and the destroyer HMS Wrestler in escorting the outward bound Convoy OG 22F through the Western Approaches on its way to Gibraltar. Fowey was detached on 19 March and returned to port. She deployed again on 5 April, this time with Bideford and HMS Watchman, escorting the inward bound Convoy HG 25 through the South Western Approaches from Gibraltar to Liverpool. She was detached on 15 April and returned to Plymouth. She was at sea again on 26 April, with the sloops HMS Deptford and HMS Folkestone, and the destroyer HMS Vivacious, escorting the outward Convoy OG 27. She was detached on 27 April and returned again to Plymouth.

May saw Fowey under refit at Devonport, during which time her pennant was changed to U15. She carried out post refit trials in June and rejoined Western Approaches Command at Liverpool in July. On 15 June she picked up 16 survivors from the Norwegian tanker SS Italia, which had been torpedoed and sunk by U-38 60 miles (97 km) west of the Scilly Isles. On 21 June she and HMS Sandwich picked up 49 survivors from the British tanker SS San Fernando, that had been torpedoed by U-47 some 50 miles (80 km) south-south-west of Cape Clear.

=== The attack on convoy SC 7 ===
Fowey spent August and September escorting convoys in the Western Approaches. She put to sea with the corvette HMS Bluebell on 16 October to come to the aid of Convoy SC 7 which was under heavy U-boat attack. They joined the sole escort, the sloop HMS Scarborough, and on 18 October they were further reinforced by the sloop HMS Leith and the corvette HMS Heartsease. Despite these measures, 17 of the 35 ships of the convoy were lost to U-boat attacks. On 19 October Fowey picked up 35 survivors from the British merchant SS Empire Brigade, sunk by U-99, and 36 survivors from the British merchant SS Shekatika, sunk by U-123. In November, Fowey was transferred to the Rosyth escort force and was deployed for convoy defence in the North Sea and North Western Approaches in December. By now she had been equipped with Type 286M Modified RAF radar outfit.

=== Refitted and reassigned ===
She spent January to May 1941 on these duties, before being transferred to the Clyde to operate in the Atlantic. She was nominated for a refit in June and sailed for Belfast. She spent July under refit, where she had her Radar Type 286M replaced by a Type 286P, and two 20mm Oerlikon guns fitted for close range defence. She resumed her convoy defence duties in August, and was deployed on them throughout September and into October. In October, she joined the sloop HMS Rochester and the corvettes HMS Bluebell, HMS Campanula, HMS Carnation, HMS Heliotrope, HMS Mallow, HMS Stonecrop and HMS La Malouine in the 37th Escort Group.

Fowey deployed with this group for the rest of 1941, until February 1942. She spent between March and April under refit in Liverpool, and after post refit trials in May, rejoined the group in June. July to September was spent with the group, followed by another refit in Liverpool in October, when she was fitted with the Type 271 surface warning radar. She then returned to the group and her convoy protection duties. She was taken in hand for a major refit at Milford Haven in January 1943, which lasted until April. She was fitted with the Hedgehog Anti-Submarine Mortar Outfit and four additional 20mm guns, which replaced her 0.5-inch machine guns. She trialled these new improvements in May, rejoining the group in June. She spent the rest of the year in the Atlantic, and was nominated for service in the Mediterranean in December. On 20 November she picked up 67 survivors from the British merchant SS Grangepark that had been torpedoed and sunk west of Gibraltar by U-263.

=== Mediterranean and the end of the war ===
Fowey sailed to the Mediterranean in January 1944. She spent February and March under repair at Alexandria, before returning to the UK in April. She underwent further repairs at Milford Haven which lasted until August. She then resumed convoy defence in the Atlantic. In September, she joined the B23 Escort Group and was deployed in the North Western Approaches. She spent the rest of the war patrolling in Home waters with the group. After VE Day Fowey was withdrawn from operational use and was sent to Stranraer to serve as a guardship. She carried out this duty at Stranraer and Lame. During this period the surrendered German U-boats were being collected in Loch Ryan prior to their destruction in Operation Deadlight.

== Postwar career ==
Fowey remained the Stranraer guardship until December 1946, when she was sent to Portsmouth. She had been selected to be transferred to Egypt in early 1946 and was under refit from May 1946. This transfer was subsequently cancelled and she was put up for disposal. She was sold to Wheelock Marsden & Co Ltd for use as a merchant vessel. She was renamed SS Rowlock and continued in commercial service until 1950. She was then sold for scrapping in Mombasa.
