= HMS Leith (U36) =

Royal Navy ship

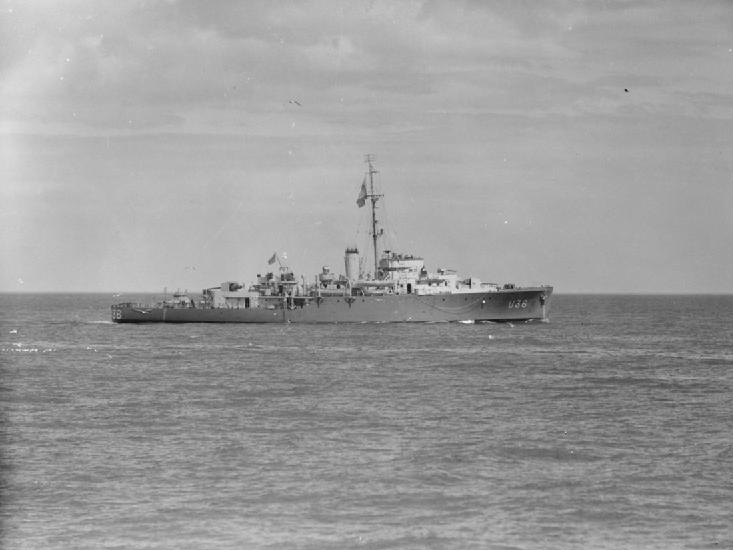
- Leith in July 1941

History

United Kingdom
- Name: HMS Leith
- Ordered: 1 November 1932
- Builder: Devonport Dockyard
- Laid down: 6 February 1933
- Launched: 9 September 1933
- Commissioned: 10 July 1934
- Decommissioned: June 1945
- Renamed: (As merchants): Byron; Friendship
- Identification: Pennant number: L36 (later U36)
- Motto: 'Persevere'
- Honours and awards: Atlantic 1939–44; North Africa; English Channel 1943
- Fate: Sold into merchant service on 25 November 1946; Acquired by Royal Danish Navy in 1949
- Badge: On a Field White an ancient ship Black with Red pennons on wavelets Gold and Blue.

Denmark
- Name: HDMS Galathea
- Acquired: 1949
- Fate: Sold for scrap 1955

General characteristics
- Class & type: Grimsby-class sloop
- Displacement: 990 tons standard; 1,300 tons full
- Length: 250 ft (76.2 m) p/p / 266 ft (81.1 m) o/a
- Beam: 36 ft (11.0 m)
- Draught: 7 ft 6 in (2.29 m)
- Propulsion: Two Admiralty 3-drum water-tube boilers; Parsons geared steam turbines; Two shafts; 2,000 shp (1,500 kW)
- Speed: 16.5 knots (31 km/h; 19 mph)
- Range: 5,700 nautical miles (10,600 km; 6,600 mi) at 10 knots (19 km/h; 12 mph)
- Complement: 100
- Armament: 2 × 4.7 in (120 mm) Mark IX guns (2x1); 1 × QF 3 inch 20 cwt AA gun; 4 × .5" MG A/A (1x4)

HMS Leith was a Grimsby-class sloop of the Royal Navy that served in the Second World War.

== Building, commissioning and early service ==
Leith was ordered on 1 November 1932 under the 1931 Programme. She was laid down at Devonport Dockyard on 6 February 1933, launched on 9 September 1933 and commissioned on 10 July 1934. She was initially assigned to the New Zealand Division of the Royal Navy, manned by the Chatham Port Division. Leith arrived at Auckland on 13 November 1934, and was deployed in the Pacific and locally in New Zealand waters. She was recommissioned in December 1936 in order to continue to serve with the New Zealand Division and was again in July 1939. She had an active career in the Pacific, making numerous visits to Colonial possessions, and on one occasion taking Salote Tupou III, Queen of Tonga on a visit to outlying islands.

== Wartime career ==
=== The Pacific and return to the UK ===
The outbreak of the Second World War saw Leith still in the Pacific. In September 1939 she sailed to Singapore to carry out contraband control duty on the China Station. During the passage she called at Jervis Bay, Australia. Leith was deployed at Penang to carry out contraband control, and also to carry out surveillance on enemy ships in Dutch East Indies ports. She was recalled from these duties in November and was ordered to sail to the UK to carry out convoy defence duties in Home Waters. She sailed from Penang on 7 November, travelling via the Red Sea and the Mediterranean. She arrived at Gibraltar, where she was diverted to go to Freetown to join as an escort for an Atlantic convoy. She joined Convoy SL 14 at Freetown on 26 December, escorting it to the UK. On arrival Leith was deployed to escort convoys. On 10 January she was diverted to join the sloops HMS Aberdeen and Bideford, and the destroyers Vidette, Wanderer, Warwick and Witch in escorting the inbound Convoy HG 14 into Liverpool. Leith was detached on 12 January and took passage for a refit at Penarth. The following day she was taken in hand by a commercial shipyard.

=== Covering the Western Approaches ===
After the completion of the refit in February she was nominated to serve with the Western Approaches Command. She joined the command at Liverpool on 2 February. On 11 February she joined the outbound Convoy OG 18 with HMS Bideford, and the destroyers HMS Active and Versatile. Leith and Bideford were detached on 17 February and joined the inbound Convoy HG 19, until 27 February. This pattern of convoy escort duties was followed throughout March to July. In July she was transferred to the Rosyth Escort Force for convoy defence in the North Western Approaches and North Sea. She was soon withdrawn from operational service to attend to a fault in her No 1 Boiler. She was repaired at Belfast. After post-repair trials she resumed services with the Western Approaches Command on 12 August with the 41st Escort Group based at Liverpool. Here she covered the final stages of convoys between Gibraltar and Freetown. On 28 August she picked up 27 survivors from the Finnish merchant Elle which had been sunk north-east of Ireland by German submarine U-101.

=== Convoy SC 7 ===
In October she deployed with the sloop HMS Folkestone and the Flower-class corvettes Bluebell and Heartsease for the defence of the Atlantic convoys during the journey to the dispersal point of the outward convoys and for the final stage of the passage of the inward convoys. On 13 October she joined the outbound Convoy OB 228 from Liverpool to its dispersal point. On 16 October U-93 attacked Leith. She sighted the submarine on the surface and forced her to submerge. Leith then carried out an unsuccessful search for her attacker with HMS Heartsease. The escorts were detached from the convoy on 17 October and sailed to join the inbound Convoy SC 7. On 18 October she rescued 19 survivors from the Estonian merchant Nora which had been torpedoed and sunk on 13 October by U-103. Together with the sloops HMS Scarborough and Fowey and the corvettes Bluebell and Heartsease they attempted unsuccessfully to fight off the wolf pack attacks of a number of U-boats. Leith rescued survivors from three torpedoed merchant ships including Assyrian and Soesterberg before joining the inbound Convoy HX 79 which had also come under heavy U-boat attack. Leith gathered up three merchant ships and brought them into port.

=== The Atlantic convoys ===
She made a full transatlantic crossing and return in November, escorting an outbound and inbound convoy, before returning to her usual pattern in December, covering the Freetown and Gibraltar convoys. On 9 December she was part of the escort for convoy OG 47 on its way to Gibraltar. The convoy came under attack on 20 December by the Italian submarine Mocenigo, which sank the merchant Manchester General. Leith was detached from the convoy on its arrival on 25 December and sailed with an inbound convoy to Liverpool on 29 December. On her arrival she returned covering the convoys through the Western Approaches throughout January to April 1941. On 17 April she began a refit at Avonmouth which lasted until May, when she was nominated for convoy defence based in Newfoundland.

Leith sailed to join the Newfoundland Escort Force based at St. John's on 6 June. She deployed with them throughout July and into August. She returned in August to redeploy with the Western Approaches Command. On 20 August she deployed with the destroyers HMS Gurkha and Lance, and the corvette HMS Zinnia and the other corvettes of the 5th Escort Group in the defence of the outward Convoy OG 71, consisting of 21 ships from Liverpool on passage to Gibraltar. The Norwegian destroyer HNoMS Bath had been sunk the previous day, along with three merchants. The convoy continued to be attacked after the reinforcements arrived, despite constant anti-submarine operations. HMS Zinnia and four other merchants were sunk on 22 August. The rest of the convoy arrived at Gibraltar on 25 August. Leith returned to Liverpool in September, escorting Convoy HG 72.

=== The African coast ===
In October Leith was at Belfast, before joining the 43rd Escort Group for escort of convoys between UK and Freetown, being based at Londonderry Port. She spent the next couple of months escorting convoys before sailing on 28 November as an escort for a convoy to West Africa. She returned in January 1942 and from 17 January underwent repairs to her underwater equipment at Londonderry Port. She returned to service on 31 January. Further escort duties took Leith along to African coast to Bathurst and back again. Her next major engagement came in August, when she was part of Convoy SL 119, consisting of 29 merchants. The convoy was detected and its position reported by U-214 on 25 August. The Wolf pack Blücher was ordered to carry out a concentrated attack. Leith carried out searches for U-boats and rescued the crew of the torpedoed merchant SS Zuiderkerk. After the arrival of the convoy, Leith underwent the replacement of her underwater dome for her sonar outfit at Greenock. After this was completed by October, she returned to Belfast.

=== Refits and the English Channel ===
Also in October Leith was nominated to escort the military convoys for the allied landings in North Africa (Operation Torch). She escorted a stores convoy late in October and spent November and December escorting convoys through the western Mediterranean. She carried these duties out until March 1943 when she return with her group to the UK. 1943 and the first half of 1944 she spent on the Freetown route. In August she returned to the Mediterranean, undergoing an extensive refit at Gibraltar in September owing to her deteriorated condition after an extended period in active service in the Atlantic. The refit lasted until December, and in January 1945 she returned to the UK and joined the 38th Escort Group based at Portsmouth. She escorted convoys through the English Channel in February and March, and in April escorted the Dutch minelayer Van der Zaan as she laid mines in the English Channel. After VE Day in May Leith was nominated to be reduced to the reserve fleet. She sailed to Rosyth in June where she was paid off, and laid up the following month.

== Post war ==
Leith was placed on the disposal list and sold in 1946 into merchant service. She was renamed Byron, and later Friendship in 1948. She was then acquired by the Royal Danish Navy in 1949 and renamed HDMS Galathea. She undertook the second Galathea expedition, which circumnavigated the world in 1950–52 while doing deep sea oceanographic research, and was sold to be scrapped at Odense in 1955.
