= Bunting tosser =

Informal term for a type of sailor

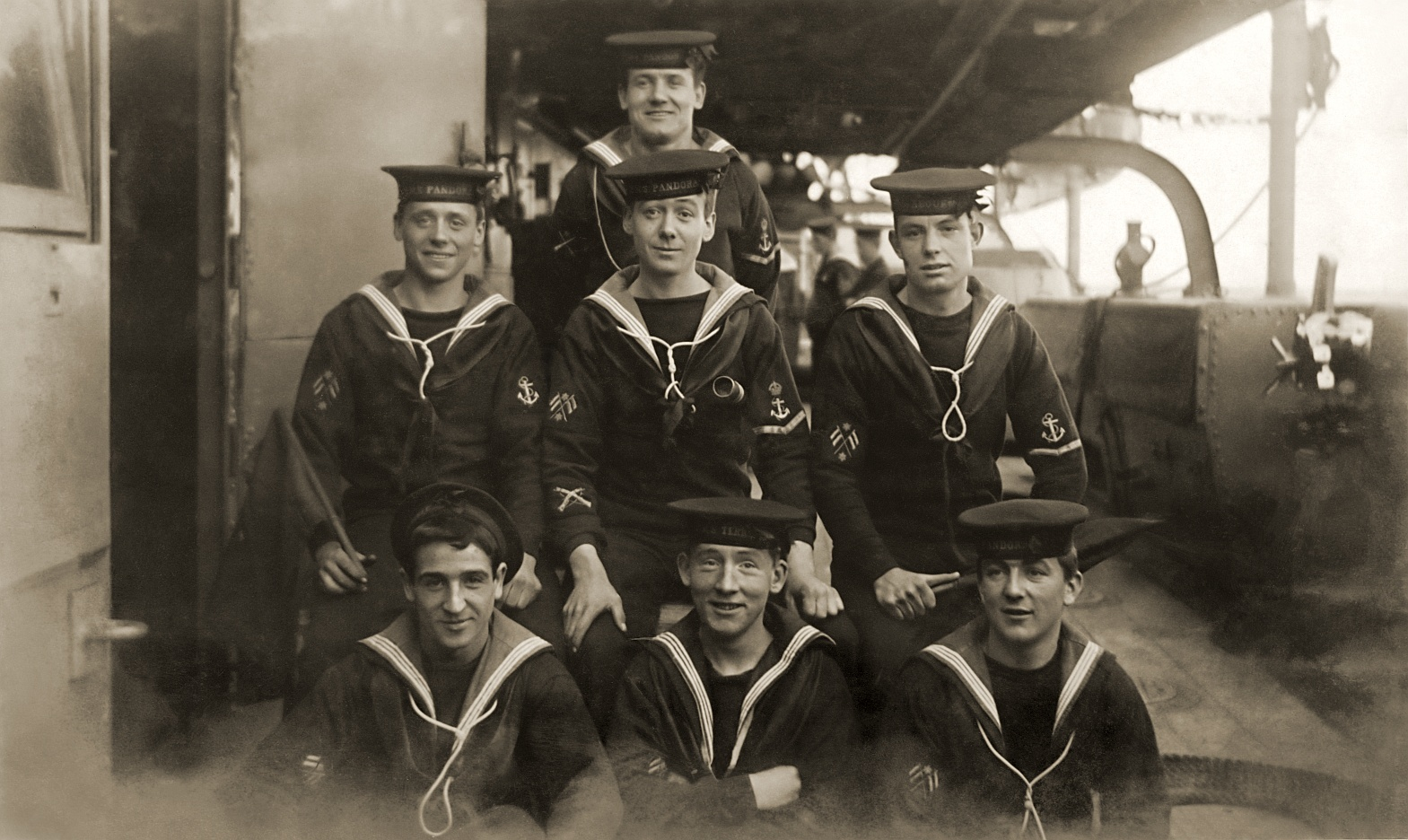
Signalmen in HMS Pandora in the early 20th century

'Bunting tosser' or 'Bunts' is an informal term used in the Royal Navy to describe the sailors who hoist signal flags. Although dating from the period of signalling by flags, it has survived as a general term for naval signallers. Wireless operators may also be termed 'sparkers'.

Bunting is now a commonplace term for any small decorative flags or streamers strung on a line, but its original etymology is more specific as the worsted cloth used for flags in the Navy.

The term doesn't appear in Covey-Crump, although that is a far from infallible source.

Although the naval term, 'bunting tosser' is known across the services, and may be used as a jocular insult amongst Army signallers, its use implies that the intended is only fit for the Navy.
