= SS Clintonia =

SS Clintonia was the name of a number of steamships that served with Stag Line Ltd, North Shields.

- SS Clintonia (1881), a 1,970 GRT cargo ship built in 1881 by Tyne Iron Shipbuilding Co, Newcastle upon Tyne. In service with Stag Line 1895-97
- SS Clintonia (1907), a 3,830 GRT cargo ship built for Stag Line in 1907 by W Doxford & Sons, Sunderland. Torpedoed and sunk in 1915.
- SS Clintonia (1917), a 3,106 GRT cargo ship built for Stag Line in 1917 by W Dobson & Co, Newcastle upon Tyne. Torpedoed and sunk in 1940.
- SS Clintonia (1941), a 6,978 GRT cargo ship built in 1941 by Lithgows Ltd, Port Glasgow. Served with Stag Line from 1946-60.
- An earlier sailing ship also bore the name of Clintonia.

== Sources ==
"Stag Line Shipping North Shields". Ships Nostalgia.
