= Urban settlement =

An urban settlement is a type of human settlement characterized by high population density and the concentration of commerce, industry and governance activities, typically accompanied by developed infrastructure. It is distinguished from rural settlements, which have lower population densities and are generally dependent on agriculture or natural resource extraction, and from suburban settlements, which occupy an intermediate position between the two. It includes towns, cities and metropolises.

- Municipal urban settlement, a type of subdivision such as Cape Town in Western Cape
- Urban settlement, an official designation for a certain type of urban locality used in some of the republics of Africa such as Southern Africa.
- Municipal urban settlement, a type of municipal formation in Russia
- Urban settlement, a synonym for urban localities in Russia
- Urban-type settlement, an official designation for a certain type of urban locality used in some of the former republics of the Soviet Union.
