= Convoy commodore =

- Ensign of the Royal Navy
- Admiralty
- Appointer: First Lord of the Admiralty
- Term length: Not fixed
- Formation: 1939–1945

Convoy commodore also known as commodore, convoys was the title of a civilian put in charge of the good order of the merchant ships in the British convoys used during World War II. Usually the convoy commodore was a retired naval officer or a senior merchant captain drawn from the Royal Naval Reserve. He was aboard one of the merchant ships. The convoy commodore was distinguished from the commander of the convoy's escort, always a naval officer. Convoy commodore is a separate title from the rank of Commodore in the Royal Navy.

== Description ==
Convoy commodores were based at HMS Eaglet, the Royal Navy's shore establishment at Liverpool. Commodores had a peripatetic role, sailing with each convoy as assigned in a suitable ship. This ship would be the convoy flagship, but remained under the command of its master, the commodore and his team merely taking passage. The commodores were accompanied by a small team of ratings, usually a yeoman and two or three signallers; these teams would stay together and work with the same commodore throughout the campaign, allowing a pattern of co-operation to develop. The commodore's responsibilities were the management of the merchant ships of the convoy, its course and speed, and its defensive manoeuvers such as zigzag patterns and evasive actions. The commodore worked together with the senior escort officer (SOE), who was in command of the warships protecting the convoy. The SOE was ultimately responsible for the safe and timely arrival of the convoy. This situation could have been a source of friction; the SOE (usually a Lt Cdr or Commander) would invariably be junior to the commodore, often a retired Flag Officer with many years experience. In practice the two worked together pragmatically; Peter Gretton, an escort commander during the Battle of the Atlantic, describes how his instructions, which were couched in the form of suggestions, were always acted upon: He recalls only one instance where he had to "pull rank" on the commodore.

== Numbers ==
There were 181 ocean commodores listed with Eaglet in 1943; of these 102 were Royal Navy and 57 were RNR. Of the others, eight were from Dominion navies (Four Royal Canadian Navy, three Royal Indian Navy and one Royal New Zealand Navy officers) and four from Allied navies (two Norwegian and two Dutch). Of the RN officers, 11 were retired Admirals, 33 Vice- and 53 Rear-Admirals and 13 were Captains.

During the Second World War the British ran 4,025 ocean and 10,025 coastal convoys; all had a commodore appointed, though the coastal convoys were generally led by the senior merchant captain present. Of the ocean convoys 1,480 were on the North Atlantic route, and of these 186 (12.5%) were attacked, losing one or more ships. Of the 78 Arctic convoys, 21 (27%) were attacked, losing one or more ships. One Admrial (Sir Studholme Brownrigg), six Vice Admirals, five Rear Admirals, and nine Captains in the Royal Naval Reserve lost their lives when the merchant ships in which they were sailing as Commodores had sunk.

There were 24 convoy commodores who lost their lives in the course of their duties, recorded on the Merchant Navy War Memorial in Liverpool.

== Convoy commodores ==
Noted commodores include:

- Captain Harry Birnie, of the Cunard Line. Died commanding Convoy SC 121.
- Admiral Sir Studholme Brownrigg who went down with his ship, SS Ville de Tamatave, on 24 January 1943 in a violent storm.
- Rear Admiral Kenelm Everard Lane Creighton, recipient of the Gibraltar Medallion of Honour for his courageous actions during the 1940 evacuation of Gibralter. Creighton defied Vichy French authorities and his superiors to protect over 13,000 Gibraltarian civilians in his convoy, ensuring their safe return to Gibralter from Casablanca after the fall of France under humane conditions despite immense pressure and personal risk.
- Admiral Sir Reginald Drax.
- Captain John Dowding, commanded the ill-fated PQ 17 and the returning QP 14. In both convoys his flagship was sunk and he had to be rescued from the icy waters of the Arctic Ocean.
- Admiral Sir Frederic Dreyer.
- Vice Admiral Wion de Malpas Egerton who was convoy commodore of Convoy ON 154 aboard Empire Shackleton. He was picked up by HMS Fidelity after Empire Shackleton was torpedoed, but died on 1 January 1943 after Fidelity was also torpedoed.
- Vice Admiral Lachlan Mackinnon. Survived his ship sinking and was rescued after a prolonged period in the cold waters of the North Atlantic; his health was damaged permanently.
- Vice Admiral Dashwood Fowler Moir who went down with his ship off Greenland while commanding Convoy SC 94.
- Admiral Eric Robinson, V.C. who served for three years. Retired exhausted.
- Vice Admiral Norman Wodehouse who went down with his ship when it was torpedoed en route to South Africa.

== Cold War ==
The United States Navy maintained a training program for convoy commodores through the Cold War. Retired United States Navy officers with recent tactical command of a destroyer or frigate, and meeting age and health criteria, were invited to attend a two-week convoy commodore training course covering:

- U.S. civil direction and naval control of shipping
- merchant ship characteristics
- control of shipping communications systems
- convoy planning (organization, routing, forming, and sailing)
- anticipated military threats and escort protection
- communications, maneuvering, and emergency procedures during operations at sea

The courses were also open to British and Canadian students. About 20 percent of the graduates were given an opportunity to participate in NATO exercises simulating attack and defense of a convoy of merchant ships. While the courses emphasized experiences during the world wars, modern convoy formations employed wider separation between individual ships requiring communication with marine VHF radio rather than the historical use of flag signals and Morse signal lamps.

The Royal Navy offered similar instruction compressed into three-and-one-half days at HMS Vernon in Portsmouth. The Royal Navy course was taught by the dedicated Maritime Trade Faculty of five instructors while the United States course was a collateral duty of Fleet Antisubmarine Warfare Training Center instructors aided by reserve officers and guest lecturers.

== Bibliography ==
- Burn, Alan (1996). The Fighting Commodores, Convoy Commanders in the Second World War. Pen & Sword Books Ltd. ISBN 978-0850525045.
- Gretton, P. (1964). Convoy Escort Commander. London: Cassell. OCLC 6441688.
- Kemp, Paul (1993). Convoy! Drama in Arctic Waters. Arms and Armour. ISBN 978-1-85409-130-7.
- Landersman, Stuart D. (1986). "I am a ... Convoy Commodore". Proceedings. 112 (6). Annapolis, MD: United States Naval Institute: 56–63. ISSN 0041-798X.
