= HMS Scarborough (L25) =

Sloop of the Royal Navy

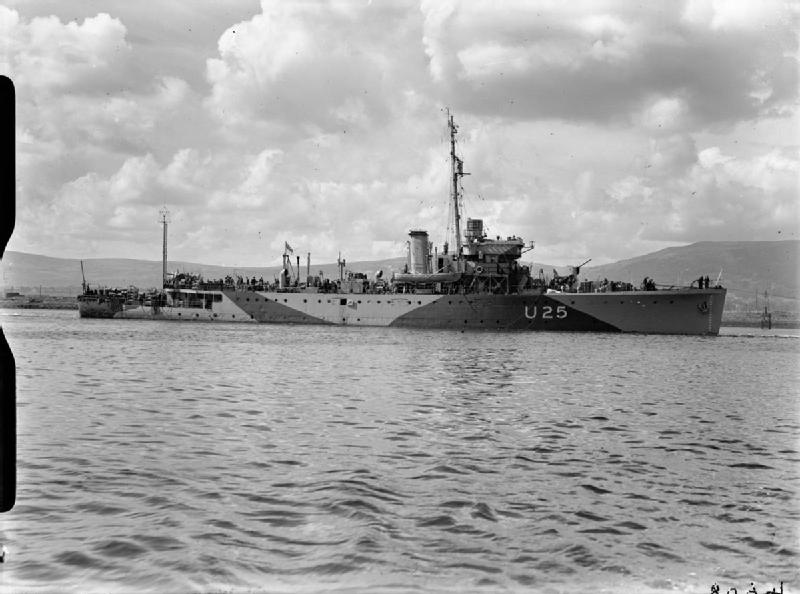
- Scarborough in coastal waters on 24 August 1943

History

United Kingdom
- Name: HMS Scarborough
- Ordered: 26 February 1929
- Builder: Swan, Hunter & Wigham Richardson, Tyne and Wear
- Laid down: 28 May 1929
- Launched: 14 March 1930
- Commissioned: 31 July 1930
- Identification: Pennant number L25 (later U25)
- Motto: Tutus est fortis: 'In strength lies our safety'
- Fate: Sold 3 June 1949; Broken up July 1949
- Badge: On a Field Red, an ancient ship with tower Gold on wavelets Silver and Blue

General characteristics
- Class & type: Hastings-class sloop
- Displacement: 1,045 tons
- Length: 250 ft (76 m)
- Beam: 34 ft (10 m)
- Propulsion: Geared turbines; two shafts; 2,000 hp (1,500 kW)
- Speed: 16 knots (30 km/h; 18 mph)
- Complement: 100
- Armament: 2 × single 4 in (102 mm) BL Mk IX guns; 1 × quad 0.5 in anti-aircraft guns

HMS Scarborough was a Hastings-class sloop of the Royal Navy launched in 1930. She served in the Second World War, especially as a convoy escort in the North Atlantic.

== Construction and commissioning ==
Scarborough was ordered on 26 February 1929 under the 1929 building programme and was laid down at the yards of Swan Hunter and Wigham Richardson Ltd., Wallsend-on-Tyne on 28 May 1929. She was launched on 14 March 1930 and commissioned on 31 July 1930.

== Pre-war ==
From 1931 onwards, Scarborough was part of the America and West Indies Squadron stationed at Bermuda. The First World War hero, Augustus Agar V.C., was her captain in the early 1930s. Peacetime duties included showing the flag, especially in smaller ports of the Empire, those unlikely to be visited by large warships.

In the summer of 1931 she was in Newfoundland, then a British dominion, sometimes acting as a yacht to take the Governor around to visit smaller ports. She was on this duty again in 1933 and in 1934 took British Prime Minister Ramsay MacDonald and his daughter up the west coast of Newfoundland to visit the Grenfell Mission at St. Anthony. While a part of the America and West Indies Squadron in 1933 she visited Prince Edward Island in Canada. There, her then captain, Commander Oswald Cornwallis, his officers and petty officers were entertained by Canadian Senator Creelman MacArthur at his summer home on Foxley River. In her peacetime cruises she was painted in the foreign station colours of white with a buff funnel.

== Wartime modifications ==
Scarborough was disarmed and used as a survey ship on the East Indies Station where she arrived in May 1939. On the outbreak of the war in September 1939, she put into Colombo for a refit, where she was rearmed with one 4-inch (102 mm) quick-firing high-angle gun, suitable against either surface or air targets. In late 1941 and 1942, she carried a 12-pounder (5 kg) quick-firing, high-angle anti-aircraft gun and gradually a number of 20 mm anti-aircraft guns were added. For anti-submarine work, Scarborough was given 15 depth charges in 1939, later increased to 40, then 80.

== Wartime career ==
=== Convoy escort ===
Scarborough was nominated to serve in Home waters on completion of her refit, and after passing through the Red Sea and Mediterranean in December, she arrived at Plymouth in January. She was taken in hand for another refit, before being assigned to the Western Approaches Command. She was attached to the 1st Escort Division at Liverpool for convoy escort in February and deployed on her first patrol on 27 February in company with the destroyers HMS Vanoc and Whirlwind, and the sloop Wellington. They covered the passage of convoy OG 20F to Gibraltar, where Scarborough and Wellington arrived in early March. She deployed again with Wellington and the destroyers Campbell, Volunteer and Walker to escort convoy HG 23 back to Liverpool.

=== SC 7 ===
She continued to escort convoys, through the Irish Sea in and out of Liverpool often in company with other sloops. By mid 1940 she was covering the North Western Approaches. She was soon engaged in escorting convoys bound to and from Canada and North America. In October she sailed to join the inward convoy SC 7, initially as the sole escort for the 35-ship convoy. The convoy had left Sydney, Nova Scotia on 4 October 1940 bound for Liverpool and other British ports. Although vulnerable to air attack, there was no aircraft protection in 1940 for Allied ships in the Atlantic Ocean after leaving coastal regions. A wolfpack of U-boats attacked the convoy and inflicted heavy losses, despite the arrival on 16 October of the sloop HMS Fowey and the corvette Bluebell as reinforcements. Scarborough herself came under attack on 17 October by U-48 and on 18 October by U-38. The escorts were joined by HMS Leith and Heartsease, but the U-boats succeeded in sinking 20 merchantmen without loss.

=== Intercepting German ships and U-boats ===
Scarborough remained on convoy defence into 1941. In the spring of 1941, Scarborough intercepted and sank two German-crewed ex-Norwegian whalers that the German auxiliary cruiser Pinguin had captured in the South Atlantic and was sending to German-occupied Bordeaux with their valuable cargo of whale oil. Star XIX was of 360 tons displacement and Star XXIV was of 250 tons displacement.

In April 1941 Scarborough was escorting a convoy through the North Western Approaches when she, HMS Wolverine and Arbutus detected and depth charged U-76, which was forced to the surface and then scuttled. In July Scarborough rescued 57 survivors from HMS Malvernian.

Scarborough was refitted in August 1941 and joined the 43rd Escort Group covering convoys between the UK and Freetown in October. She carried out these duties into 1942. On 16 April she was involved in a collision with HMS Bradford. Scarborough was refitted again in July, which involved the fitting of a new Type 271 radar for surface warning.

=== North Africa ===
After completing the refit in October she was nominated to support the planned landings in North Africa (Operation Torch). She deployed out of Gibraltar escorting convoys for the rest of the year, moving to the western Mediterranean in January. She returned to the UK in February and was deployed with the 39th Escort Group. On 7 February 1943 Scarborough was part of the escort of Convoy MJS-7 when three of its merchant ships hit mines west of Gibraltar that had been laid by a German submarine on 1 and 2 February 1943. Empire Mordred sank taking 12 crew and 3 gunners down with her, but HMS Scarborough rescued the master, 41 crew and 13 gunners. She landed them safely in Liverpool. The rest of the year was spent escorting Atlantic convoys. Scarborough was transferred to the 15th Escort Group at based in Belfast in January 1944.

=== Normandy landings and reserve ===
In May she was assigned to support the Allied landings in Normandy on D Day in June 1944. Scarborough was to follow closely behind British minesweepers and Trinity House vessels which were making a path through the German minefields near the coast of Normandy. She dropped buoys to mark the clear path for the assault convoys. On 7 June she was re-deployed for duty as a control ship for Coastal Forces craft. She returned to Portsmouth in July and was then paid off at Hartlepool and reduced to the reserve. She spent the rest of the war laid up.

== Postwar ==
After the end of the war Scarborough was placed on the disposal list and sold to BISCO on 3 June 1949. She was towed to Thornaby-on-Tees and arrived at the breakers yard on 3 July, where she was scrapped.
