= Hastings-class sloop =

1930 class of sloops-of-war

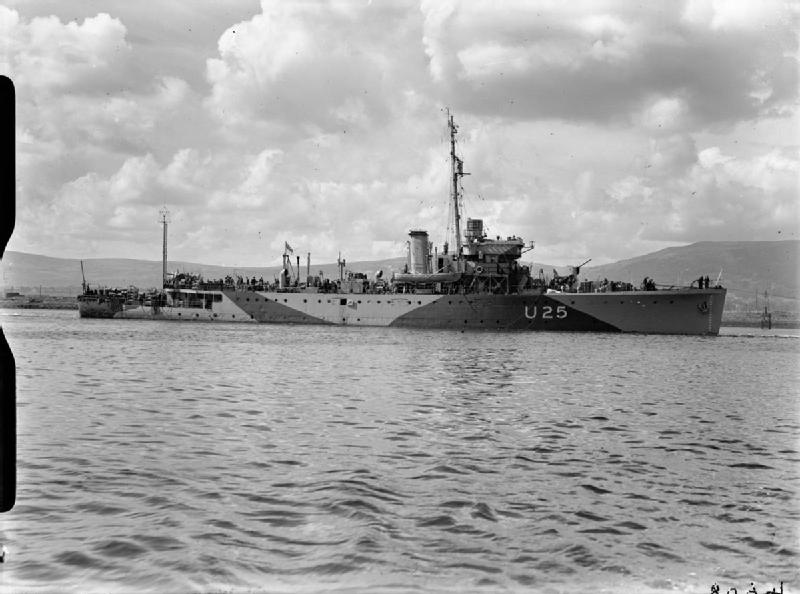
- HMS Scarborough in August 1943

Class overview
- Name: Hastings class
- Operators: Royal Navy; Royal Indian Navy; Pakistan Navy
- Preceded by: Bridgewater class
- Succeeded by: Shoreham class
- Completed: 5
- Lost: 1
- Retired: 4

General characteristics
- Type: Sloop
- Displacement: 1,045 tons
- Length: 250 ft (76 m)
- Beam: 34 ft 1 in (10.39 m)
- Draught: 12 ft 6 in (3.81 m)
- Propulsion: Geared turbines; two shaft 2,000 shp (1,500 kW)
- Speed: 16 kn (30 km/h)
- Armament: 2 × 4-inch (102 mm) guns (2 × 1); 4 × .5 in AA gun (1 × 4)

The Hastings class, also known as the Folkestone class, was a class of sloop which were built for the Royal Navy and the Royal Indian Navy in the interwar period. In total five ships were built, and went on to see service in the Second World War.

== Design ==
The Hastings were a follow on of the previous Bridgewater class and utilised features developed from the lessons learnt from the convoy escorts of the First World War. They were fitted out as fleet minesweepers, but were intended to be multifunctional vessels. Features included a high, sustained forecastle to improve operations in high seas, and they were fitted with turbine machinery to improve performance. This turned out to be a drawback as the turbine machinery could not be mass-produced and the design was superseded by the Second World War in favour of classes that could be quickly brought into service.

== Service ==
Five ships were built in total, four for the Royal Navy and one for the Royal Indian Navy. They were launched in 1930 and all saw service in the Second World War. HMS Scarborough was disarmed before the outbreak and was rearmed with a 4 inches (100 mm) high angle anti-aircraft gun, a 12-pounder gun and 15 depth charges, this number later being increased to 80. One, HMS Penzance was lost during the war after being torpedoed by U-37. The remaining Royal Navy ships were decommissioned after the war and had all been scrapped by 1949. The sole Indian ship, HMIS Hindustan was later involved in the Royal Indian Navy Mutiny, and was subsequently transferred to the Pakistan Navy in 1948 on its formation, and was renamed Karsaz. She was broken up in 1951.
