= HMS Bluebell (K80) =

Flower-class corvette

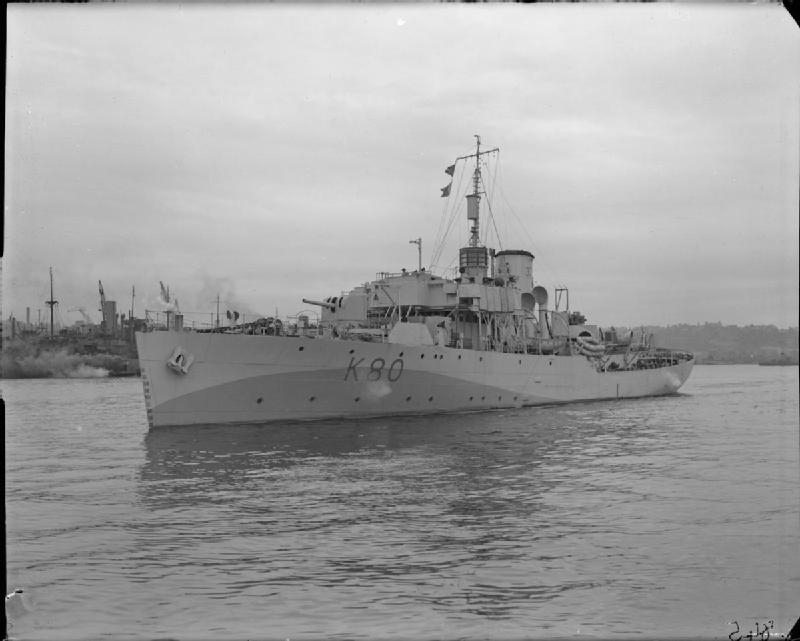

History

United Kingdom
- Name: HMS Bluebell
- Ordered: 27 July 1939
- Builder: Fleming & Ferguson, Paisley
- Yard number: 559
- Laid down: 25 October 1939
- Launched: 24 April 1940
- Completed: 19 July 1940
- Identification: Pennant number: K80
- Honours and awards: Atlantic 1940-44; Sicily 1943; Mediterranean 1943; Normandy 1944; Arctic 1945
- Fate: Torpedoed and sunk, 17 February 1945
- Badge: On a Field White, a Bell, Blue, banded and clappered Gold.

General characteristics
- Class & type: Flower-class corvette
- Displacement: 940 long tons (960 t)
- Length: 205 ft (62 m)
- Beam: 33 ft (10 m)
- Draught: 11 ft 6 in (3.51 m)
- Propulsion: 2 × fire tube boilers; 1 × 4-cycle triple-expansion steam engine
- Speed: 16 knots (30 km/h) at 2,750 hp (2,050 kW)
- Range: 5,000 nautical miles (9,300 km) at 10 knots (9,260 km at 18.5 km/h)
- Complement: 86
- Armament: 1 × BL 4-inch (100 mm) Mk IX gun; 1 × 2-pounder (40 mm) "pom-pom"; 2 × 20 mm Oerlikon anti-aircraft guns; 2 × .303 inch (7.7 mm) twin Lewis machine guns; 1 × Hedgehog A/S Mortar; 4 × Mk.II Depth Charge Thrower (K-gun); 2 × stern depth charge racks with 40 depth charges

Service record
- Operations: Battle of the Atlantic; Arctic convoys; Allied invasion of Sicily; Invasion of Normandy

HMS Bluebell was a Flower-class corvette that served in the Royal Navy in World War II. Ordered from Fleming & Ferguson of Paisley, Scotland on 27 July 1939, she was launched on 24 April 1940 and commissioned in July 1940. She served in the Atlantic, Mediterranean and Arctic campaigns, escorting several convoys to Russia, and also took part in the invasions of Sicily and France. She was torpedoed and sunk by U-711 in the Kola Inlet on 17 February 1945 while escorting the convoy RA 64 from Murmansk. Only one member of her crew survived.

== Service history ==
After commissioning and sea trials in July 1940, Bluebell was deployed on Atlantic convoy escort duties. One of her first duties, in October 1940, was to meet Convoy SC 7 mid-ocean. She rescued all 39 officers and men from the cargo steamship SS Scoresby, which had been torpedoed and sunk on 17 October.

In January 1941 Bluebell was attached to the 5th Escort Group, Western Approaches Command, based at Liverpool, to escort Atlantic convoys, transferring in September to the 37th Escort Group for the defence of convoys between Gibraltar and ports in West Africa. She returned to the UK in July 1942 to refit, and was assigned for service on the Russian Convoys. In September she sailed to Iceland to join the escort of Convoy PQ 18 to Arkhangelsk, returning in November, and resuming Atlantic convoy escort duties in December and January. In February 1943 she joined the escort of Convoy JW 53 from Loch Ewe to Kola Inlet, returning in March to resume duties in the Western Approaches.

In June 1943 Bluebell was sent to the Mediterranean, and in early July was part of the escort for assault convoys during the initial landings in the Allied invasion of Sicily, remaining in the Mediterranean for further convoy escort duties until August when she returned to the Western Approaches.

Between February and April 1944 she escorted Russian Convoys JW 57 and JW 58, and in May was transferred to Escort Group 143 to prepare for the invasion of Normandy. On 6 June she formed part of Convoy ECL1 escorting LSTs from the Bristol Channel to the landing beaches, then escorted follow-up convoys until released on 25 June. In August she was transferred to the 8th Escort Group and joined the escort force for Russian Convoy JW 59, returning in September.

After further convoy defence and interception duties, on 2 February 1945 she was attached to the escort for Russian Convoy JW 64. After arriving at Kola Inlet she took part in anti-submarine operations against U-boats known to be gathering to carry out attacks on the return convoy. On 17 February, as Convoy RA 64 was assembling off Murmansk, Bluebell was hit in the stern by an acoustic homing torpedo fired by U-711, which caused her depth charges to explode. She sank in less than 30 seconds at 69°24′N 33°42′E. From her crew of 86 ratings and officers there was only one survivor.
