= Sydney, Nova Scotia =

Community in Nova Scotia, Canada

Sydney
- Urban community
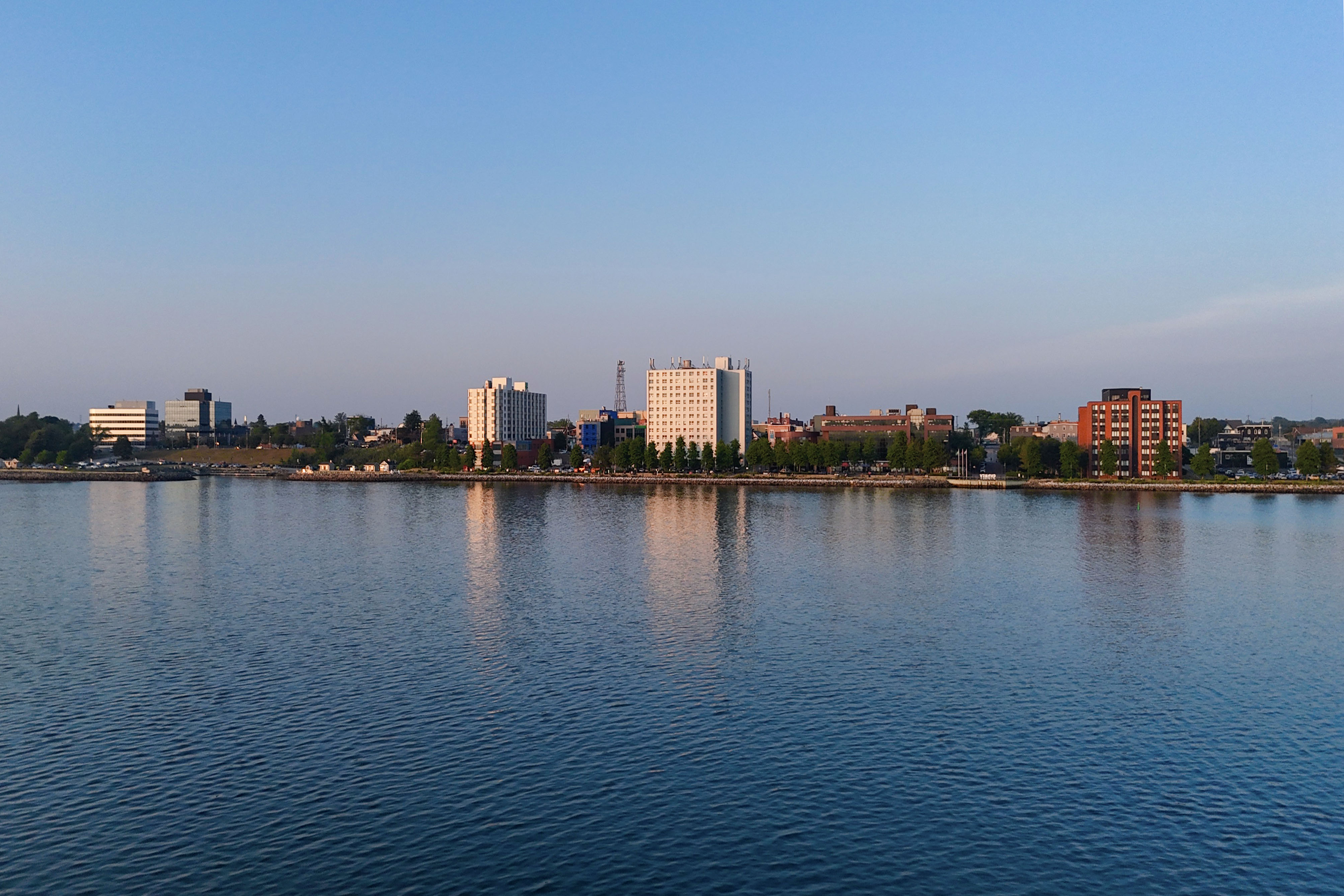
- Waterfront
- Nickname: The Steel City
- Location of Sydney in Nova Scotia
- Coordinates: 46°08′11″N 60°11′44″W
- Country: Canada
- Province: Nova Scotia
- County: Cape Breton
- Municipality: Cape Breton Regional Municipality
- Founded: 1785
- Incorporated City: 1904
- Amalgamated: 1 August 1995
- Named for: Thomas Townshend, 1st Viscount Sydney

Area
  - Total: 30.91 km^{2} (11.93 sq mi)
- Highest elevation: 66 m (217 ft)
- Lowest elevation: 0 m (0 ft)

Population (2021)
  - Total: 30,960
  - Density: 1,002/km^{2} (2,594/sq mi)
  - Metro density: 718.5/km^{2} (1,861/sq mi)
- "Metro" population based on a 43 km^{2} or 17 sq mi sample that is larger than the old boundaries for the former City of Sydney, pre-1995.
- Time zone: UTC–4 (AST)
  - Summer (DST): UTC–3 (ADT)
- Canadian Postal code: B1L – S
- Area code(s): 902 & 782
- Website: sydney.capebretonisland.com

Sydney is a former city and urban community on the east coast of Cape Breton Island in Nova Scotia, Canada within the Cape Breton Regional Municipality. Sydney was founded in 1785 by the British, incorporated as a city in 1904, and dissolved on 1 August 1995, when it was amalgamated into the regional municipality.

Sydney served as Cape Breton Island's colonial capital until 1820, when the colony was annexed to Nova Scotia.

A rapid population expansion occurred just after the turn of the 20th century, when Sydney became home to one of North America's main steel mills. During both the First and Second World Wars, it was a major staging area for England-bound convoys. The post-war period witnessed a major decline in the number of people employed at the Dominion Steel and Coal Corporation steel mill, and the Nova Scotia and Canadian governments had to nationalize it in 1967 to save the region's biggest employer, forming the new crown corporation called the Sydney Steel Corporation (SYSCO). The city's population has steadily decreased since the early 1970s due to the plant's fortunes, and SYSCO was finally closed in 2001. Today, the main industries are in customer support call centres and tourism. Together with Sydney Mines, North Sydney, New Waterford, and Glace Bay, Sydney forms the region traditionally referred to as Industrial Cape Breton.

== History ==
=== Early history 1700s to 1899 ===
Prior to a permanent settlement being established, there was significant activity along the shore. During the American Revolution, on 1 November 1776, John Paul Jones – the father of the American Navy – set sail in command of Alfred to free hundreds of American prisoners working in the coal mines in eastern Cape Breton. Although winter conditions prevented the freeing of the prisoners, the mission did result in the capture of the Mellish, a vessel carrying a vital supply of winter clothing intended for John Burgoyne's troops in Canada.

A few years into the war (1781) there was a naval engagement between two French ships and a British convoy off Sydney, Nova Scotia, near Spanish River, Cape Breton. The convoy, which consisted of 18 merchant vessels, including nine colliers and four supply ships, was bound for Spanish River on Cape Breton Island to pick up coal for delivery to Halifax. The British convoy escorts suffered considerable damage with one ship, Jack captured. The French ships also suffered damage. In the end the convoy was still able to load coal and transport it to Halifax. Six French sailors were killed and 17 British, with many more wounded.

Sydney was founded after the war by Colonel Joseph Frederick Wallet DesBarres, and named in honour of Thomas Townshend, 1st Viscount Sydney, who was serving as the Home Secretary in the British cabinet. Lord Sydney appointed Col. DesBarres lieutenant-governor of the new colony of Cape Breton Island. In November 1784 the 600-ton ship Blenheim landed a group that consisted primarily of English citizens and disbanded soldiers. A group of Loyalists from the state of New York (which included David Mathews, the former mayor of New York City under the British), fleeing the aftermath of the American Revolution, were added to the immigrants upon their arrival in the neighbouring colony of Nova Scotia. DesBarres arrived at Sydney on 7 January 1785. He held the first meeting of his executive council on 21 February 1785, where he was proclaimed lieutenant-governor in a formal manner and the first minutes of the new colony were taken. The site DesBarres chose for the new settlement was along the Southwest Arm of Sydney Harbour, a drowned valley of the Sydney River, which forms part of Spanish Bay. Between 1784 and 1820, Sydney was the capital of the British colony of Cape Breton Island. The vice regal residence was located to the east of military grounds along DesBarres Street (and since re-developed as a residential area). The colony was disbanded and merged with neighbouring Nova Scotia as part of the British government's desire to develop the abundant coal fields surrounding Sydney Harbour; the leases being held by the Duke of York. In 1826, the leases were transferred to the General Mining Association and industrial development around Sydney began to take shape.

Sydney was incorporated as a town in 1885.

=== Steel city 1900–1945 ===
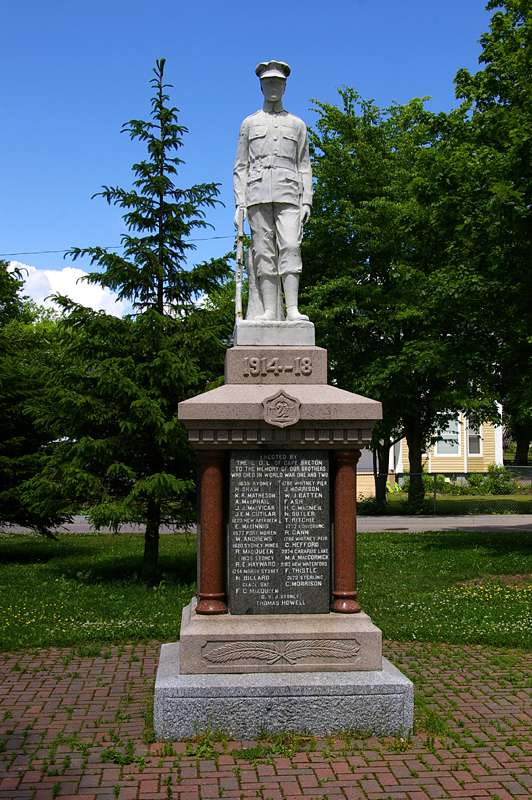
Orangemen War Memorial in Wentworth Park

By the early 20th century Sydney became home to one of the world's largest steel plants, fed by the numerous coal mines in the area under the ownership of the Dominion Steel and Coal Corporation. Sydney's economy was a significant part of Industrial Cape Breton with its steel plant and harbour and railway connections adjoining the coal mining towns of Glace Bay, New Waterford, Sydney Mines and Reserve Mines. The economic boom brought about by industrialization saw the community incorporate as a city in 1904. The growth continued until the 1930s, with the Great Depression causing a slowdown in production and growth. World War II brought prosperity again for the plant, and the coal mines.

Sydney Harbour played an important role during World War II. Once a Royal Canadian Navy base, HMCS Protector, was established to stage supply convoys bound for Europe. These convoys tended to be slower and had the prefix SC for Slow Convoy. Convoy SC 7 typified the dangers inherent with the Nazi U-boats off the coast of Cape Breton and Newfoundland during the Battle of the Atlantic, when 20 of the 35 merchant cargo vessels were sunk on their journey to England. Sydney Harbour was one of the hotspots of the Battle of the St. Lawrence. Two notable shipping attacks occurred during this battle: the sinking of the train ferry SS Caribou in October 1942 on its way from North Sydney to Port aux Basques, Newfoundland; and the sinking of the Sydney-based HMCS Shawinigan on 24 November 1944 in the Cabot Strait, near Cape North, on Cape Breton Island. Sydney's coal shipping and steel manufacturing made a significant contribution to the Allied war effort, however federal Minister of Industry, C. D. Howe favoured Central Canada's steel industry given its proximity to a larger workforce and less exposure to coastal attack.

=== Post-war years 1950–2014 ===
By the late 1960s the coal and steel industries had fallen on hard times. Friday, 13 October 1967, became known as "Black Friday", so named after Hawker Siddeley Canada, the plant's owners, announced they were closing it in April 1968. Both the provincial and federal government were involved in negotiating with the steel plant's owners, when Cape Breton's citizens held the largest protest in the city's history on 19 November 1967: "The Parade of Concern." Around 20,000 people marched about a mile from the plant's gates to a horse racetrack to show their support for the steel plant. Newly appointed Nova Scotia premier G.I. Smith and federal Health Minister, and Cape Breton MP, Allan J. MacEachen spoke to the crowd and assured them that their respective governments were going to help. Four days later the Smith government announced that they were taking over the plant starting in 1968.

Both the steel and coal industries continued under government ownership for the rest of the 20th century. By the early 1990s, both industries were in trouble again, and were permanently closed by the end of 2001. Forced to diversify its economy after the closures of the steel plant and coal industries, Sydney has examined a variety of economic development possibilities including tourism and culture, light manufacturing and information technology. Cleaning up the former steel plant, and the toxic Sydney Tar Ponds it left behind in Muggah's Creek, were a source of controversy due to its health effects on residents, although it has provided some employment since SYSCO closed. The tar pond cleanup was completed in 2013 with the opening of Open Hearth Park, which sits on the direct site of the former steel plant and has hosted events such as an Aerosmith concert in September 2014.

== Geography ==
Sydney is on the east bank of the Sydney River where it discharges into South Arm of Sydney Harbour. Elevation ranges from sea level to 66 m (217 ft) above sea level.

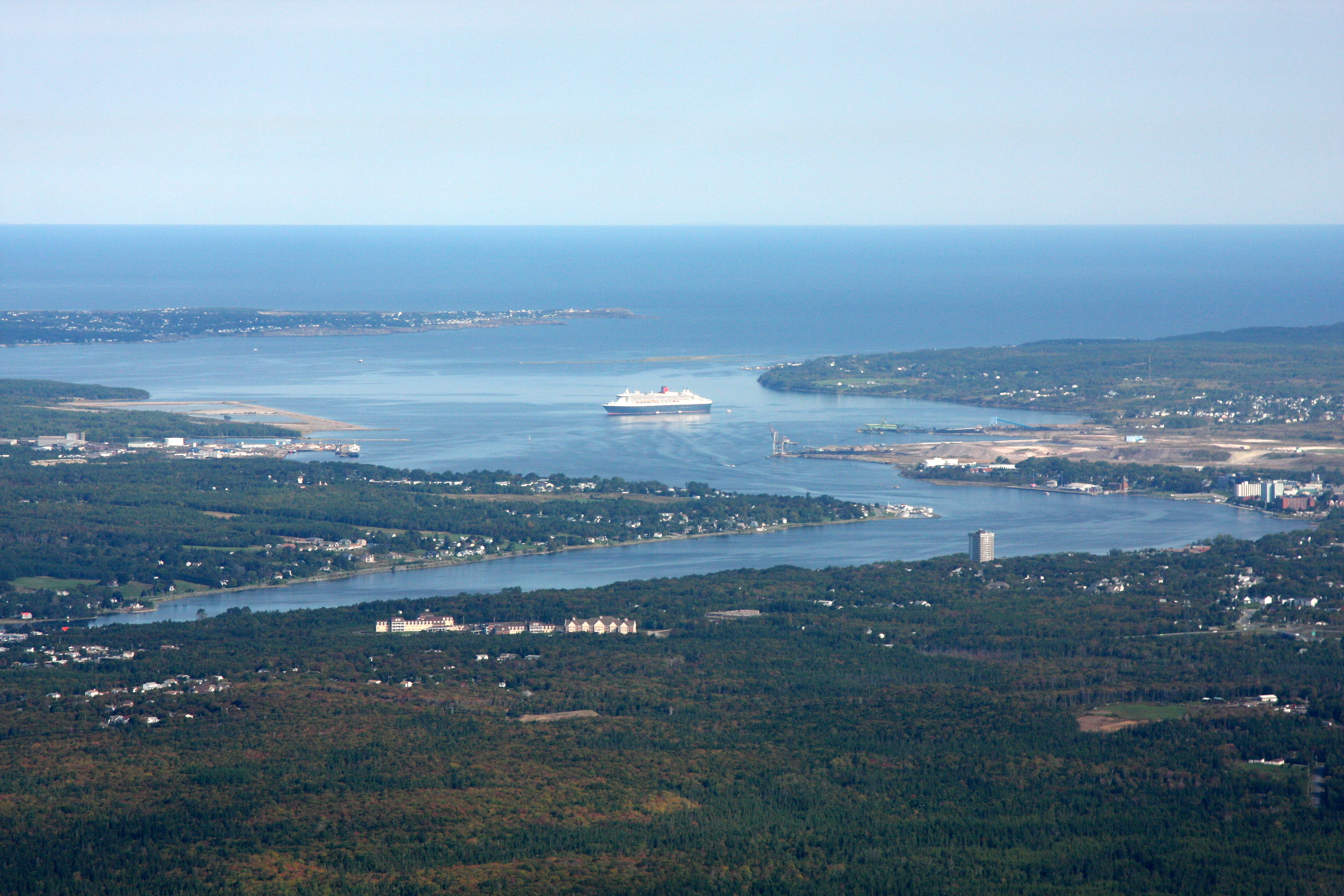
Sydney Harbour aerial view looking towards the north-east. The Queen Mary 2 lies in the harbour.

The majority of properties within the former city limits have been impacted by development and an extensive urban road network. The central business district is located on a peninsula extending into South Arm formed by Sydney River on the west side and Muggah Creek on the east side. The largest park within the former city limits is Open Hearth Park.

Distinctive neighbourhoods include Whitney Pier in the north east end next to the former steel plant site, Ashby in the east end, Hardwood Hill in the south end and the "North End" located on the peninsula which contains the Holy Angels convent and the Sydney Garrison known as Victoria Park, headquarters of the Cape Breton Highlanders reserve infantry regiment. The former city completely encircles the Membertou First Nation (First Nations Reserve 28A and 28B).

=== Climate ===
Sydney experiences a cool summer, and windy, wet and stormy winter, version of a humid continental climate (Köppen Dfb) that is significantly moderated by the community's proximity to the Atlantic Ocean. The highest temperature ever recorded in Sydney was 36.7 °C (98 °F) on 18 August 1935. The lowest temperature ever recorded was −31.7 °C (−25 °F) on 31 January 1873, 29 January 1877 and 15 February 1916.

Due to the relatively strong influence from large bodies of water, Sydney experiences strong seasonal lag, meaning February is the year's coldest month on average, and August is the year's warmest month on average. By contrast, in most continental climates in the Northern Hemisphere, January is the coldest month, July the warmest.

In other respects, too, Sydney's climate varies significantly from that of other areas with humid continental climates. The most significant variations are that Sydney experiences unusually cool summers, and relatively windy, wet and stormy winters, relative to other humid-continental areas such as in the interior of North America. Annual temperatures are instead rather similar to areas around the Baltic Sea in north-eastern Europe at much higher latitudes, although Sydney's seasonal lag is stronger. Although Sydney has some maritime influence, similar latitudes on the other side of the Atlantic have significantly milder climates in all seasons except summer. Sydney is in the direct path of fall and winter storms (in the U.S., called nor'easters) migrating from the U.S. Northeastern and New England states; these storms can attain tremendous intensity by the time they approach Sydney, with high winds, heavy snow, ice and/or rain events common, primarily from October to February. Summer thunderstorms are rare in Sydney, because nearby bodies of cool water sharply inhibit the combination of heat and humidity that fuels summer-season thunderstorms elsewhere (for example, the United States' central and southeastern states, and east-central and northern China). In recent years, due to a warming climate, this has changed. In 2013 and 2016 Sydney was under a tornado watch as a result of unusually powerful thunderstorms. On 8 August 2014, a funnel cloud appeared near the Sydney Airport although no tornado warning or tornado watch was issued and the funnel did not actually touch down.

While occasional thunderstorms and other rains can occur in summer, June through August are Sydney's driest months on average. Sydney's average annual precipitation cycle reflects these realities; the year's driest month, on average, is July; its wettest month, on average, is December. Average annual precipitation in Sydney is 1481.4 mm, virtually the highest found anywhere in Canada outside coastal British Columbia. Snowfall is heavy, averaging 281.1 cm per winter season. However, winter-season storms are variable, and can bring changing precipitation types, commonly from ice/snow to rain and possibly back to ice/snow. As such, actual snow accumulation is variable. A winter storm can bring accumulating snow, followed by heavy rain, then a brief return to snow or ice, resulting in no or minimal additional snow accumulation. Overall, Sydney's climate is moderately cold and strikingly variable, wet, stormy and windy from fall to early spring (October to March), and more stable and drier in summer (June to August).

Climate data for Sydney Airport, 1991–2020 normals, extremes 1870–present (Note: Based on station coordinates provided by Environment Canada, climate data was collected near downtown Sydney from January 1870 to March 1941, and from April 1941 to the present day at Sydney Airport.)
Month	Jan	Feb	Mar	Apr	May	Jun	Jul	Aug	Sep	Oct	Nov	Dec	Year
Record high °C (°F)	16.9 (62.4)	18.0 (64.4)	24.0 (75.2)	27.2 (81.0)	31.1 (88.0)	34.4 (93.9)	33.9 (93.0)	36.7 (98.1)	32.3 (90.1)	27.4 (81.3)	23.0 (73.4)	16.7 (62.1)	36.7 (98.1)
Mean maximum °C (°F)	9.4 (48.9)	8.1 (46.6)	11.5 (52.7)	17.2 (63.0)	23.9 (75.0)	28.0 (82.4)	30.1 (86.2)	29.9 (85.8)	27.2 (81.0)	21.3 (70.3)	16.6 (61.9)	12.1 (53.8)	31.5 (88.7)
Mean daily maximum °C (°F)	−0.8 (30.6)	−1.1 (30.0)	1.8 (35.2)	6.8 (44.2)	13.2 (55.8)	18.6 (65.5)	23.4 (74.1)	23.4 (74.1)	19.4 (66.9)	13.1 (55.6)	7.7 (45.9)	2.6 (36.7)	10.7 (51.3)
Daily mean °C (°F)	−5.0 (23.0)	−5.5 (22.1)	−2.3 (27.9)	2.5 (36.5)	7.9 (46.2)	13.2 (55.8)	18.2 (64.8)	18.4 (65.1)	14.5 (58.1)	8.9 (48.0)	4.0 (39.2)	−0.9 (30.4)	6.2 (43.2)
Mean daily minimum °C (°F)	−9.1 (15.6)	−9.9 (14.2)	−6.4 (20.5)	−1.7 (28.9)	2.7 (36.9)	7.8 (46.0)	12.9 (55.2)	13.4 (56.1)	9.5 (49.1)	4.6 (40.3)	0.4 (32.7)	−4.4 (24.1)	1.6 (34.9)
Mean minimum °C (°F)	−18.5 (−1.3)	−19.3 (−2.7)	−16.4 (2.5)	−8.0 (17.6)	−3.2 (26.2)	1.5 (34.7)	6.9 (44.4)	7.2 (45.0)	2.1 (35.8)	−2.0 (28.4)	−7.0 (19.4)	−13.0 (8.6)	−20.5 (−4.9)
Record low °C (°F)	−31.7 (−25.1)	−31.7 (−25.1)	−31.1 (−24.0)	−17.8 (0.0)	−7.8 (18.0)	−3.9 (25.0)	0.6 (33.1)	2.2 (36.0)	−2.2 (28.0)	−5.6 (21.9)	−13.9 (7.0)	−23.3 (−9.9)	−31.7 (−25.1)
Average precipitation mm (inches)	139.1 (5.48)	131.0 (5.16)	121.3 (4.78)	119.8 (4.72)	98.9 (3.89)	100.8 (3.97)	87.3 (3.44)	99.2 (3.91)	118.2 (4.65)	144.0 (5.67)	149.2 (5.87)	169.8 (6.69)	1,481.4 (58.32)
Average rainfall mm (inches)	73.9 (2.91)	65.3 (2.57)	87.4 (3.44)	97.3 (3.83)	100.8 (3.97)	97.4 (3.83)	88.6 (3.49)	97.4 (3.83)	121.3 (4.78)	149.2 (5.87)	151.0 (5.94)	117.0 (4.61)	1,246.5 (49.07)
Average snowfall cm (inches)	77.6 (30.6)	68.0 (26.8)	44.7 (17.6)	22.9 (9.0)	1.5 (0.6)	0.0 (0.0)	0.0 (0.0)	0.0 (0.0)	0.0 (0.0)	0.4 (0.2)	9.2 (3.6)	56.8 (22.4)	281.1 (110.7)
Average precipitation days (≥ 0.2 mm)	20.4	16.3	16.9	15.5	14.9	14.3	12.2	12.8	13.7	16.5	17.7	21.0	192.2
Average rainy days (≥ 0.2 mm)	8.8	7.1	10.2	13.0	14.8	13.8	12.3	12.6	13.3	16.8	15.7	12.2	150.3
Average snowy days (≥ 0.2 cm)	16.9	13.3	11.0	5.8	0.8	0.0	0.0	0.0	0.0	0.5	4.9	14.3	67.4
Average relative humidity (%) (at 15:00 LST)	73.4	70.3	69.0	67.9	64.8	65.1	64.6	64.7	67.2	69.9	73.7	76.5	68.9
Average dew point °C (°F)	−7.6 (18.3)	−8.4 (16.9)	−5.5 (22.1)	−1.3 (29.7)	3.4 (38.1)	8.8 (47.8)	13.8 (56.8)	14.5 (58.1)	11.2 (52.2)	5.9 (42.6)	1.2 (34.2)	−3.4 (25.9)	2.8 (37.0)
Mean monthly sunshine hours	91.0	111.6	132.9	141.0	198.0	224.6	246.9	228.4	167.1	130.1	77.0	68.2	1,816.7
Percentage possible sunshine	32.4	38.3	36.1	34.7	42.7	47.7	51.8	52.0	44.3	38.3	27.1	25.3	39.2
Source 1: Environment Canada
Source 2: weatherstats.ca (for dewpoint and monthly&yearly average absolute maximum&minimum temperature)

== Demographics ==
Population Centre
Year	Pop.	±%
2006	32,496	—
2011	31,597	−2.8%
2016	30,170	−4.5%
2021	30,960	+2.6%
Census Profile – Population Centre 2006 population figure adjusted to boundary changes made between 2006 and 2011.

Former city

Year	Pop.	±%
1871	1,700	—
1881	2,180	+28.2%
1891	2,427	+11.3%
1901	9,909	+308.3%
1911	17,723	+78.9%
1921	22,545	+27.2%
1931	23,089	+2.4%
1941	28,305	+22.6%

Year	Pop.	±%
1951	31,317	+10.6%
1956	32,162	+2.7%
1961	33,617	+4.5%
1966	32,767	−2.5%
1971	33,230	+1.4%
1976	30,645	−7.8%
1981	29,444	−3.9%
1986	27,754	−5.7%

Year	Pop.	±%
1991	26,063	−6.1%
1996	25,636	−1.6%
2001	23,990	−6.4%
2006	22,789	−5.0%
2011	22,936	+0.6%
2016	22,516	−1.8%
2021	23,085	+2.5%

2006 population is estimated due to boundary changes.
Sources: 2011, 2016 and 2021 populations are from Dissemination Areas.

Statistics Canada classifies Sydney as a medium population centre, which for census purposes includes the neighbouring communities of Westmount, a significant portion of Sydney River, and other portions of the former Cape Breton County. The 2011 population of the Sydney census area, was 31,597, making it the largest population centre on Cape Breton Island.

== Economy ==
Sydney suffered an economic decline for several decades in the later part of the 20th century as local coal and steel industries underwent significant changes. The closure of the Sydney Steel Corporation's steel mill and the Cape Breton Development Corporation's coal mines in 2000–2001 have resulted in attempts by the municipal, provincial and federal governments to diversify the area economy.

At the start of the 21st century, Sydney faced a significant challenge in the cleanup of the Sydney Tar Ponds, a tidal estuary contaminated with a variety of coal-based wastes from coke ovens that supplied the steel industry. After extensive public consultation and technical study, a $400 million CAD cleanup plan jointly funded by the federal and provincial governments has been completed and the Open Hearth Park opened in its place.

In one part of Whitney Pier, residents of Frederick St. discovered contamination within several homes and in surrounding soil, including a toxic orange substance oozing into local basements. Testing of the substance lasted over a year and many were outraged by delays, although some residents were subsequently relocated to a safer residential area nearby.

High unemployment and lack of opportunities have resulted in many educated young people leaving the community for jobs in other parts of Canada and the US. Demographic changes, including an aging population and decrease in the birth rate, have affected the area's economic outlook. Specifically, many residents have opted to seek work in Alberta and Ontario.

Sydney's economy was buoyed by the 2011 announcement of funding for the Sydney Harbour dredging project, which was completed in 2012. The dredge, which is expected to lead to commercialization of the port, is purported to create hundreds of jobs in the area, and position Sydney as a world-class harbour facility. Other important investments that have helped position Sydney as an eastern hub of Nova Scotia include the twinning of Highway 125 and the creation of the Centre for Sustainability in the Environment at nearby Cape Breton University, which draws hundreds of international students each year.

=== Tourism ===
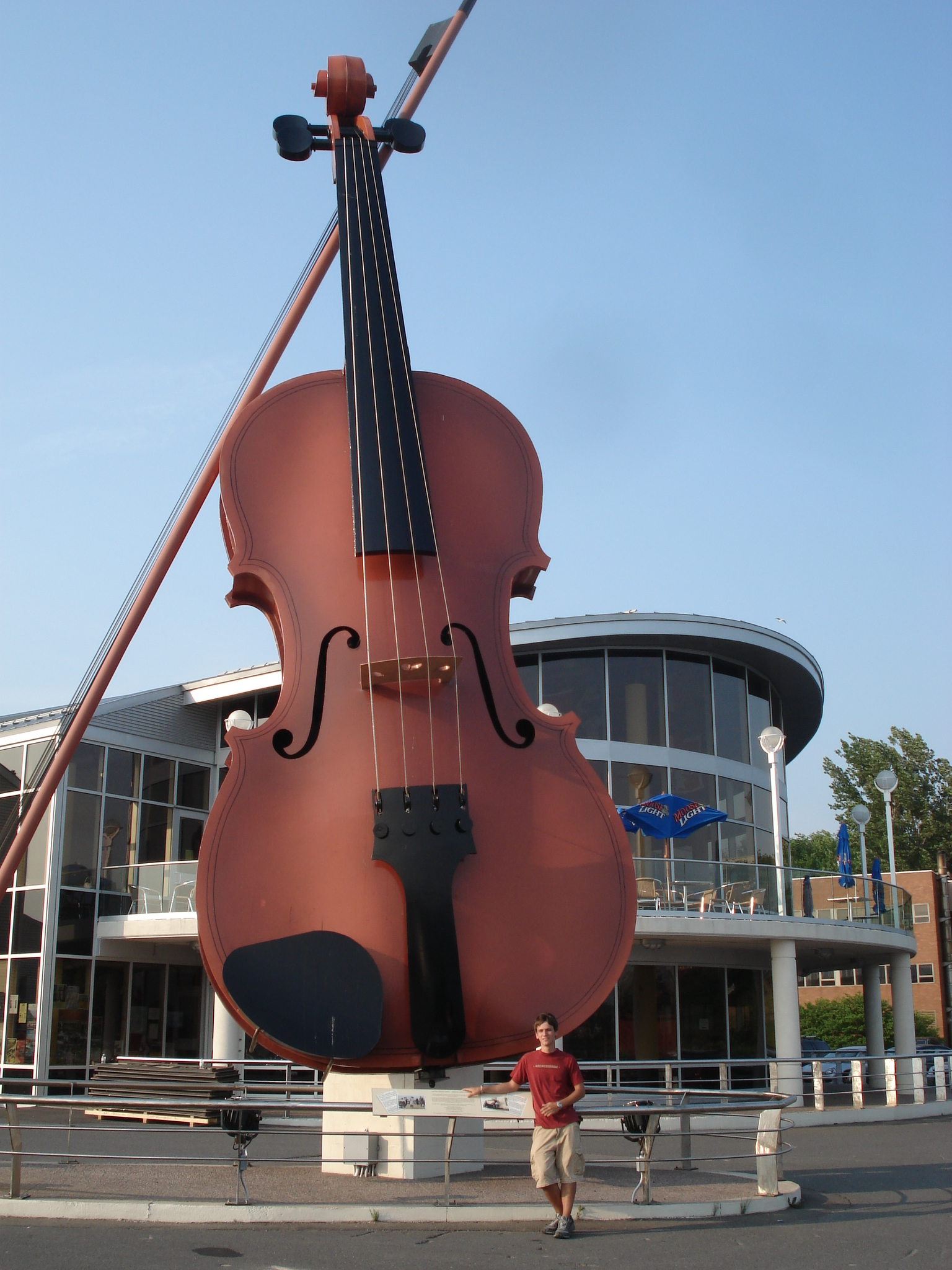
The "Largest Ceilidh Fiddle in the World". Located at the Sydney waterfront.

Cape Breton Island has become home to a significant tourism industry, with Sydney (as the island's largest urban centre) being a prime beneficiary. With its economy being dominated by the steel industry until the early 2000s, Sydney had been overlooked as a tourist destination, with the more centrally located scenic village of Baddeck being a preferred location for tourists transiting the Cabot Trail. However, Sydney has witnessed a revival as a result of significant government investment in cruise ship facilities and a waterfront revitalization plan which has seen a boardwalk and marinas constructed, and the world's largest fiddle. This funding is part of the post-industrial adjustment package offered by the federal and provincial governments.

Sydney's tourism draw is increasingly linked to its cultural asset as being the urban heart of Cape Breton Island. Its population is a diverse mixture of nationalities which contributes to various Scottish, Acadian, African Canadian and eastern European cultural events being held throughout the year. Sydney's accommodation sector is centrally located to attractions in Louisbourg (home of the Fortress of Louisbourg), Glace Bay (home of the Glace Bay Miners Museum), Baddeck (home of the Alexander Graham Bell Museum), as well as popular touring destinations such as the Cabot Trail, Cape Breton Highlands National Park, and Bras d'Or Lake.

== Arts and culture ==
=== Music ===
The annual Celtic Colours International Festival is held throughout Cape Breton Island in October, with some of the concerts taking place in Sydney.

Sydney was selected to host the 2000, 2005, 2010, and 2016 ECMA Galas.

== Sports ==
Semi-professional hockey has a long tradition in Sydney. In December 1912, a group formed a professional hockey club to challenge for the Stanley Cup. The short-lived Sydney Millionaires, who received that nickname because the players were the highest paid in the Maritimes, won the 1913 Maritime Professional Hockey League championship. Their victory allowed them to challenge the Quebec Bulldogs, the then current cup holder, in Quebec City. On 10 March 1913, the Millionaires lost the second and final game of the Stanley Cup, and folded shortly thereafter.

From 1988 to 1996, Sydney was home to the Cape Breton Oilers of the American Hockey League, the primary farm team of the National Hockey League's Edmonton Oilers. They won that league's championship, the Calder Cup, in 1993. The franchise moved to Hamilton, Ontario, after the 1995–96 season, becoming the Hamilton Bulldogs.

Founded in 1997, the Cape Breton Eagles of the QMJHL play their home games at Centre 200. Eagles alumni include three-time Stanley Cup champion Marc-André Fleury.

The Cape Breton Highlanders of the National Basketball League of Canada played from 2016 to 2019.

Sydney hosted events for the 1987 Canada Winter Games, held throughout Cape Breton County.

The 2003 World Junior Ice Hockey Championships were co-hosted by Sydney and Halifax.

Tennis has a long history in Sydney. The Sydney Lawn Tennis Club (now the Cromarty Tennis Club) was incorporated by an Act of the Nova Scotia Legislature on 28 April 1893. The Cape Breton Junior Regionals, Masters Championships, and the Cape Breton Open tennis tournaments are held annually.

== Transportation ==
Sydney is served by Highway 125 which connects to Highway 105 and encircles the former city limits to its eastern terminus. Trunk 4 forms an important secondary road in Sydney running along the Sydney River, connecting to Glace Bay. Trunk 22, connecting to Louisbourg, and Trunk 28, connecting Whitney Pier through to New Waterford, form minor secondary roads.

=== Public transportation ===
Transit Cape Breton is owned and operated by the Cape Breton Regional Municipality and provides bus services in the eastern part of the municipality, which includes Sydney.

Transit Cape Breton also operates "Handi-Trans" for passengers whose disabilities restrict them from using regular bus services.

Transit fares are $1.25 per zone travelled, or $1.00 for seniors 55 & up and children 5–12. Depending on the number of zones travelled, the cost of riding the bus can range from $1.00 to $5.00.

=== Rail ===
Sydney was home to two private freight railway companies. The Sydney Coal Railway connects a bulk coal unloading pier in Whitney Pier with the Lingan Generating Station in Lingan. Until 2015, the Cape Breton and Central Nova Scotia Railway made Sydney its eastern terminus and provided rail connections to CN in Truro via Port Hawkesbury; as of 2026, its tracks were largely in place but abandoned and unusable north of Port Hawkesbury. Daily passenger rail service was provided by Via Rail Canada until budget cuts on 15 January 1990. A weekly tourist train, the Bras d'Or was operated by Via Rail Canada from 2000 to 2004 until being discontinued.

=== Sea ===
Sydney's port facilities include the privately owned bulk coal unloading pier in Whitney Pier as well as the publicly owned Sydney Marine Terminal at the northern edge of the central business district. A recently opened cruise ship pavilion welcomes several dozen cruise ships every year, with the majority visiting in late summer or early fall to take in fall foliage tours. Other port facilities on Sydney Harbour are located outside the former city limits in Point Edward (Sydport) and North Sydney (Marine Atlantic ferry terminal).

=== Airport ===
The JA Douglas McCurdy Sydney Airport is located several kilometres outside the former city limits in the neighbouring community of Reserve Mines. The regional airport is served year round by Air Canada and seasonally by West Jet.

Occasionally, travellers intending to go to Sydney, Australia mistakenly arrive in Sydney, Nova Scotia. This mistake is usually due to confusion of the two destinations in flight ticket bookings.

== Health care ==
The Cape Breton Regional Hospital is located in Sydney.

== Education ==
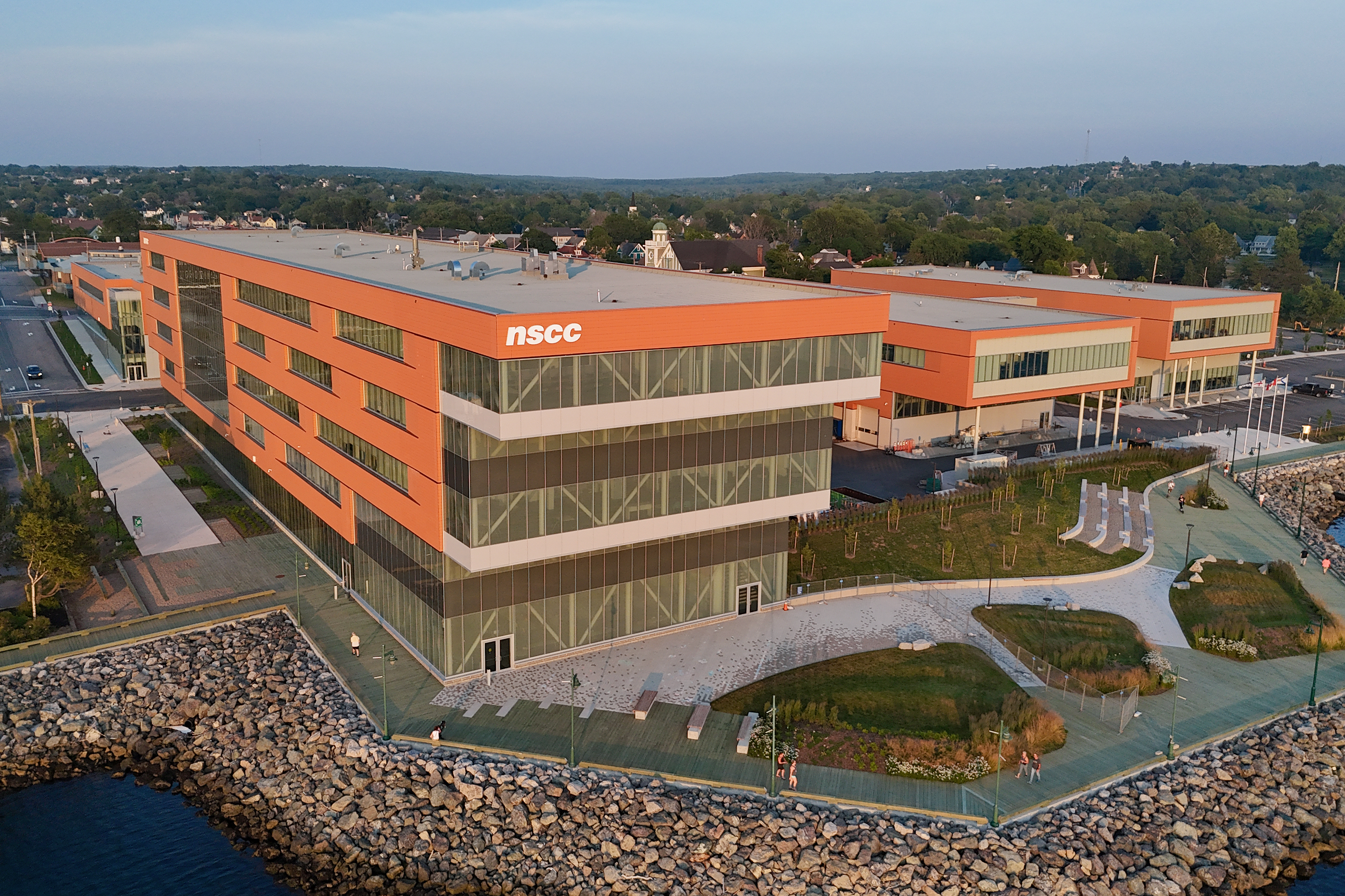
Nova Scotia Community College Sydney waterfront campus

Sydney is part of the Cape Breton – Victoria Regional School Board and is home to one public English language secondary school: Sydney Academy, which is linked to several elementary and intermediate schools. Holy Angels, a female-only Catholic high school founded in the late 1800s, closed at the end of the 2011 school year. A French language school, Étoile de l'Acadie, is also located in Sydney and is part of the Conseil scolaire acadien provincial school board.

In 1951, the original campus of what became Cape Breton University was founded as the Xavier Junior College, affiliated with St. Francis Xavier University and was located in Sydney. Sydney also has other post secondary and private career colleges, including the Cape Breton Business College founded in 1958 and the Canadian Coast Guard College founded in 1965.

In 2024, Nova Scotia Community College opened a 305,000 sq. ft. waterfront campus.

== Media ==
Sydney is the island's largest commercial centre and home to the Cape Breton Post daily newspaper, as well as one television station, CJCB-TV, a member of the CTV Television Network. (Note: CBIT-TV (CBC) existed from 26 September 1972 until 31 July 2012, when the CBC closed-down its over-the-air analog transmitters in small markets. It produced a local news broadcast until 1991, when local news shows were consolidated to Halifax. The CBC Nova Scotia television signal, which originates from Halifax, is now only available via cable or satellite providers.) CJCB was the first television station in Nova Scotia, going on air on 9 October 1954. It was also the eastern terminus of the original country-wide microwave network that went live on 1 July 1958, with the Canada's first coast to coast television broadcast. From its beginnings until 1972, CJCB-TV was the area's CBC affiliate.

Sydney's first radio station was CJCB-AM, founded by Nate Nathanson, and went on the air on 14 February 1929. The Nathanson family would go on to open an FM radio station in 1957, CJCB-FM, and the above-mentioned television station. CBC began operating its own station, CBI (AM), in November 1948. It was part of the CBC's Trans-Canada Network, while CJCB became a CBC affiliate for its Dominion Network. In 1962, the CBC combined the two networks, making CBI the only CBC station, and CJCB became an independent. In 1978, the CBC opened CBI-FM, which belonged to the CBC Stereo network. Since 1997, CBI-AM belongs to CBC Radio One and CBI-FM belongs to CBC Music. In addition to the CBC and CJCB stations, there are other FM radio stations serving the area, most coming into the market in the early 21st century.

== Notable people ==
- Sir John George Bourinot, journalist, historian, and 3rd Clerk of the House of Commons (Canada)
- Paul Boutilier, retired National Hockey League (NHL) hockey player, Stanley Cup Champion
- John Buchanan, former Premier of Nova Scotia
- George Cleveland, actor in the original U.S. television series Lassie
- Nathan Cohen, theatre critic, CBC Radio & TV host and personality
- Harold Connolly, 15th Premier of Nova Scotia
- David Dingwall, former federal cabinet minister
- Norm Ferguson, retired NHL hockey player, member of Nova Scotia Sport Hall of Fame
- Mayann Francis, former Lieutenant-Governor of Nova Scotia
- Danny Gallivan, former Hockey Night in Canada sportscaster, member of Canadian Sports Hall of Fame
- Gordie Gosse, MLA for Cape Breton Nova, Speaker of the House of Assembly
- Danny Graham, former MLA and leader of Nova Scotia Liberal Party
- John Jr. Hanna, retired NHL hockey player
- Ursula Johnson, multidisciplinary Mi’kmaq artist, now based in Halifax, Nova Scotia
- Fabian Joseph, former Captain of the Canada men's national ice hockey team, two-time Olympic silver medallist
- Neil Libbey, historian
- Bette MacDonald, actress, singer, comedian
- Donald MacDonald, former President of the Canadian Labour Congress/MLA for Sydney
- Finlay MacDonald, senator; founding director, CTV; Canada Games chair
- Frankie MacDonald, amateur weather presenter and YouTube personality
- Parker MacDonald, former NHL player and coach
- Daniel MacIvor, playwright
- A. A. MacLeod, political organizer, pacifist, M.P.P., and uncle of Warren Beatty and Shirley MacLaine
- Al MacNeil, retired NHL player and head coach, Stanley Cup Champion
- Greg MacPherson, musician
- Glenda MacQueen, medical researcher
- Arthur B. McDonald, physicist, jointly awarded the 2015 Nobel Prize in Physics with Japanese physicist Takaaki Kajita
- Jacquelyn Mills, documentary filmmaker
- Kevin Morrison, retired NHL hockey player
- Maynard Morrison, comedian
- Scott Oake, Hockey Night in Canada sportscaster
- Isaac Phills, Order of Canada recipient.
- Lisa Raitt (née MacCormack), Conservative Member of Parliament (MP), federal cabinet minister
- Calvin Ruck, former activist and senator
- Todd Sampson, CEO of advertising agency Leo Burnett Australia, Earth Hour co-creator, and TV presenter.
- D. M. Schurman, former imperial and naval historian
- Irving Schwartz, former businessman, philanthropist, Officer of the Order of Canada
