= Donald Macintyre (Royal Navy officer) =

British Royal Navy officer

Donald George Frederick Wyville Macintyre
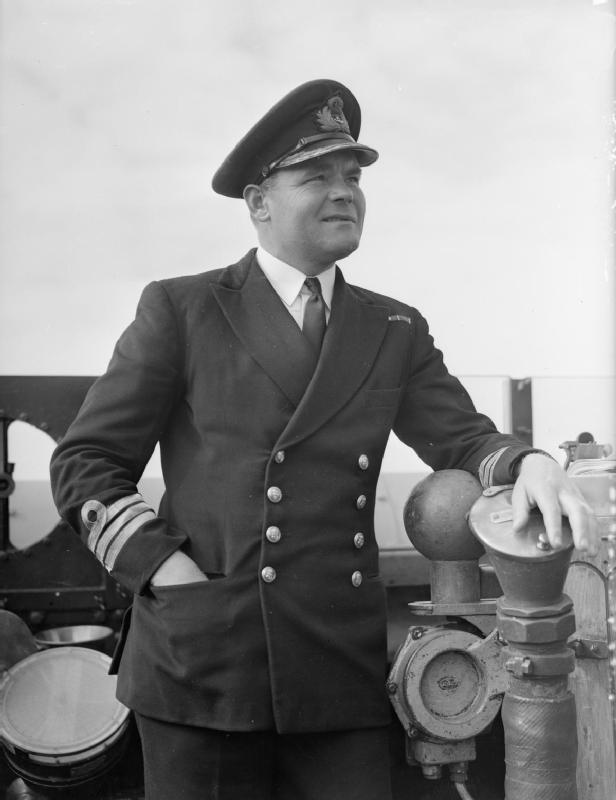
- Commander Donald MacIntyre
- Born: 26 January 1904; Dehra Dun, Uttarakhand, India
- Died: 23 May 1981 (aged 77); Ashford, Kent
- Military career
- Allegiance: United Kingdom
- Branch: Royal Navy
- Service years: 1926–1955
- Rank: Captain
- Commands: HMS Blackcap; 5th Escort Group; HMS Bickerton; Escort Group B2; HMS Walker; HMS Hesperus; HMS Venomous; HMS Defender; HMS Kingfisher
- Conflicts: Second World War: Norwegian Campaign; Battle of the Atlantic
- Awards: Distinguished Service Order & Two Bars; Distinguished Service Cross; Mentioned in Despatches; Legion of Merit (United States)

Donald George Frederick Wyville Macintyre DSO & Two Bars, DSC (26 January 1904 – 23 May 1981) was a Royal Navy officer during the Second World War and a successful convoy escort commander. Following the war, he was an author of numerous books on British naval history.

== Biography ==
=== Early career 1926–1939 ===
Macintyre joined the Navy in 1926, serving in his first year in a destroyer with the Mediterranean fleet before transferring to the Fleet Air Arm (FAA) to train as a pilot. He served seven years with the FAA, first in HMS Furious, then HMS Hermes on the China Station, then in HMS Courageous with the Home fleet. In 1935 an accident left him unfit to fly, and he returned to surface vessels.

He was given command of HMS Kingfisher, an anti-submarine patrol vessel, and was attached to HMS Osprey -the anti-submarine school at Portland.

In 1937, he took command of his first destroyer, Defender, and was again stationed in the Far East, seeing action during the Amoy crisis in 1938. In 1939, he returned to Britain to take command of the destroyer HMS Venomous, joining a Channel flotilla as war broke out.

=== Second World War 1939–1945 ===
==== Beginnings ====
In 1939, not long after the declaration of war, Macintyre and Venomous were on escort duty in the English Channel with a destroyer flotilla led by HMS Malcolm (Captain T Halsey), escorting troopships from Britain to France.

In January 1940, he took command of Hearty, which was commissioned and renamed Hesperus, (to avoid confusion with another destroyer, HMS Hardy). Hesperus was very similar to other H-class destroyers, but had been modified with such peculiarities as unfamiliar markings on the gun-sights and no director sight; being one of six vessels originally built for the Brazilian navy. His first operation with her was in conjunction with HMS Havant (Commander Burnell-Nugent) which was to assist in the occupation of the Faroe Islands.

In April 1940, he, with Hesperus, was involved in the Norwegian campaign, seeing action at Narvik and Mo. Hesperus suffered bomb damage from two near misses at the latter location; after which she was docked in Dundee for repairs. Macintyre and Hesperus were transferred to the Atlantic, working alongside HMS Hurricane; the two ships spent most of that year's winter battling severe weather, before Macintyre was moved to take command as SOE (senior officer escort) of Walker, handing Hesperus over to Commander AA Tait in March 1941. Walker was lead ship and Macintyre was the senior officer of the 5th Escort Group in the North Atlantic.

==== SOE (Senior Officer Escort) ====
===== Three U-boat commanders =====
Macintyre's first action as SOE, was with convoy HX 112 as part of a major battle which resulted in the destruction of two U-boats, U-100 and U-99 commanded by Joachim Schepke and Otto Kretschmer, for the loss of five ships. U-100 was destroyed by HMS Vanoc, while MacIntyre in Walker sank U-99, though her captain and most of her crew were saved. Kretschmer, complete with his binoculars, was among the survivors who were picked up by Walker. Macintyre 'liberated' the binoculars and used them throughout the rest of the war. With the loss of U-47 and her skipper Günther Prien earlier that month, the elimination of three leading U-boat aces saw the end of the Happy Time, a period of U-boat ascendancy; for the rest of the year, the escorts would have the upper hand.

===== Move =====
As a result of Luftwaffe attention, during which Macintyre's car was "written off", it was decided to move the escort ships from Liverpool to the relative safety of Londonderry in Northern Ireland. On his first voyage up the River Foyle to the port, Macintyre was horrified to find that the pilot that he had embarked for the short trip would not use the conventional methods of navigation, preferring to steer instead for 'Mother Murphy's white cow' or 'Paddy Monaghan's byre'.

===== Marriage and Iceland =====
Macintyre and EG 5 continued their escort duty for the rest of the year, serving on the North Atlantic and Gibraltar routes until the winter of 1941, when both Macintyre and the group were exhausted; EG 5 was disbanded. After a refit, which included the installation of radar, Walker was assigned to the Home Fleet at Hvalfjord in Iceland, as an escort to capital ships. It was during this period Macintyre married Monica Strickland, on 11 November 1941 at Brompton Oratory in South Kensington, London.

In February 1942, Macintyre was posted to the US Naval base at Argentia, near Placentia in Newfoundland, as British liaison officer. It was only after his arrival that he discovered Placentia had been the location for the first Roosevelt−Churchill meeting which had resulted in the Atlantic Charter. He encountered an example of American 'can-do' as far as building the base was concerned. One night, on the return trip to his quarters following a ('dry') mess dinner, he was astonished to find that the road from his accommodation to the mess had disappeared as it had out-lived its usefulness.

Whilst in Iceland, the US Navy repair ship USS Prairie was badly damaged by a fire which had started on the wooden jetty to which she was moored. Macintyre's chief concern were the two British corvettes which were moored close to the Prairie and their deck armament of depth charges. The fire was extinguished and the Prairie was replaced.

==== Back to sea ====
===== The Hesperus re-visited =====
In June Macintyre returned to destroyer operations, assuming command of Hesperus once more, and in charge of the Escort Group B2, part of the re-organized Mid-Ocean Escort Force (MOEF). For the rest of 1942, the B-2 Group was on North Atlantic escort duty.

Unsuccessful attacks were carried out on two U-boats in October 1942 while escorting convoy ONS 138. The boats were part of a pack of at least four. U-620 was the first to be depth-charged, but without result. The other, U-301, evaded the escort group's attack by diving deep. The ships of the group spent two days keeping the U-boats under (where they were less effective), allowing the convoy to escape.

===== The Canadians =====
Macintyre was often frustrated by the inexperience and lack of training in the Royal Canadian Navy (RCN) early in the war. The gargantuan expansion of that service might explain the situation. On one occasion while still commanding Walker, an accompanying Canadian warship was unable to communicate when the battery on her signal lamp gave out and no spare was available. On another, a Canadian ship due to meet Macintyre in Argentia arrived with 'We Want Leave' painted on her superstructure. More seriously, depth charges were found to be rusted into their housings, primed and armed. However, McIntyre's own gaffes later in the war with his own well trained ship's company were quite as remarkable.

===== Tragedy and triumph =====
The autumn of 1942 saw near continuous gales around Iceland. It was in such weather that a crew member was swept overboard. The conditions were too bad to lower a boat, but an officer went over the side. Despite getting the man halfway up the ship's hull, his strength gave out and the sailor slipped from his grasp, never to be seen again.

Among a stream of official signals sent while the escort group was still at sea, Macintyre received a personal message informing him that he had become a father on Guy Fawkes Day (5 November). He beat his first-lieutenant by "a short head".

===== U-357 =====
On the next homeward-bound convoy in late December, Macintyre had sanctioned the loading of a large number of Christmas turkeys in the bow section of Hesperus, a decision he was to regret.

On 26 December, while escorting convoy HX 219, Hesperus and Vanessa engaged U-357. The encounter ran throughout the day with both ships firing patterns of depth charges without success. At one point Macintyre saw a periscope just 50 yards from his ship. Contact was nevertheless lost and then found again. With the onset of darkness, Hesperus received a message from Vanessa that the U-boat had surfaced and that she intended to ram it. But, following some frantic manoeuvring by both vessels, Vanessa could only manage a glancing blow on the German.

Hesperus stepped in. Both the destroyer and the U-boat employed every trick in the book in an attempt to out-wit the other. Hesperus kept her two signal searchlights on the U-boat's conning tower which probably distracted the German skipper into making a fatal error, i.e. crossing the British destroyers' bow. Hesperus rammed the U-boat, cutting it almost in half, leaving only a spreading pool of oil and a handful of survivors.

The celebrations were somewhat tempered when it was discovered that Hesperus had sustained significant damage to her bows and her extra cargo had been reduced to a sodden mess. Repairs in dry-dock in Liverpool, lasting three months, were required.

===== U-191 =====
Hesperus returned to sea in April 1943 with a new weapon, (Hedgehog) and new officers, so a period of training was required. However, very little time was available. The northerly sailing convoy, ONS 4, needed an escort; that task fell to the B2 Group which now consisted of two destroyers, Hesperus and Whitehall and five corvettes.

On 23 April Hesperus detected a U-boat on the surface less than 10 miles away. On closing the German (which had crash-dived), it was decided to use Hedgehog. The order to fire was followed by an embarrassing silence as the safety-pins had not been removed; this was soon realised and a pattern of depth charges were fired instead, including one that weighed considerably more (one ton), than the standard weapon. Unfamiliar sounds were then heard via the ASDIC (sonar), and Hedgehog was tried once more, this time with more success. U-191 was sunk with all hands.

==== Perilous journey, but the war goes on ====
===== Ice =====
Over 29 April, on the way to Newfoundland, the convoy found itself negotiating icebergs with the help of Hesperus' radar and searchlights. Miraculously, the ships did not suffer any casualties.

===== Routine in harbour =====
Hesperus adopted two ports as her home base: Argentia and Liverpool. St Johns was also used occasionally. Macintyre always appreciated the opportunity of a hot bath and being able to sleep in a bunk that remained stationary once harbour was safely reached.

Argentia was an all-male base; American officers would visit from their 'dry' ships. They would often be entertained by the Hesperus officers singing (in the original German), 'Zumba Za'. On one occasion in Liverpool, civilians in reserved occupations, who were visiting for their duty-free gin, were told quite seriously by the navigating officer that a passage had been arranged for them on the next convoy trip. The offer was not taken up.

Macintyre could usually get away to his wife and child when his ship was in Liverpool between convoys.

==== SC 129 ====
B2 Group left Argentia with the slow convoy SC 129 on 5 May 1943. Six days later, two ships in the convoy were torpedoed in daylight by U-402, the first sinkings (in nine months) in a convoy that Macintyre was involved with. He was understandably very unhappy (see para three of 'Successes' below), but revenge had to wait until that night when Hesperus damaged U-223 which only just managed to return to St Nazaire.

===== U-186 =====
Mcintyre left U-223 thinking she was sinking, to another ship; on his way back to the convoy, the ASDIC on Hesperus picked up another contact which turned out to be U-186. After a number of depth-charge attacks, the concussion of an underwater explosion was felt, oil and debris was seen reaching the surface.

No more U-boats were confirmed sunk while Group B-2 were escorting SC 129, although there were several sightings, radar and ASDIC contacts. Macintyre in Hesperus was faced with a dilemma; his own ship was very short of depth charges, the other destroyer in the escort group, Whitehall, was low on fuel. Other ships in the group (the corvettes), could not catch a U-boat on the surface, but by 16 May, the convoy had moved out of the danger area.

==== A new group ====
In April 1944, Macintyre left Hesperus (very reluctantly), to assume command of Bickerton, an American-built ship. He would also take charge of the 5th Escort Group, then forming in Belfast. After a working-up period, the group began operations on 21 April, supporting the escort of convoy ONS 233. Having found themselves under-used, the group was re-deployed, carrying out an abortive sweep for a single U-boat before joining the escort aircraft carrier Vindex and the 9th Escort Group on the 26th.

===== U-765 =====
In the early morning of 5 May, following a lengthy hunt, the half-group (the other half were kept with Vindex), were sent to an area known to contain a U-boat which was on weather-reporting duty. With the use of direction-finding equipment and aircraft from Vindex, the search area was reduced. Having found his target, Macintyre then decided to use the 'creeping' attack method pioneered by Captain 'Johnnie' Walker. This involved the use of a second ship, (in this case the frigate HMS Bligh), to do the actual attacking while the first ship (Bickerton), controlled things such as the ASDIC tracking.

A series of depth charge explosions were rewarded with the sight of a badly damaged U-boat breaking the surface. Bickerton moved in to administer the coup-de-grace, but she was beaten to it by a Swordfish from Videx which dropped two more depth charges on the hapless German vessel. A handful of survivors were taken prisoner.

Upon questioning the prisoners, it was realised that U-765 was to have been relieved, (by, it was later discovered, U-736). It was decided to repeat the attack, but it was unsuccessful.

==== D-Day ====
Before and after D-Day (6 June 1944), Macintyre, Bickerton and the 5th Escort Group were part of the RN's contribution to the invasion of France by patrolling in the relatively shallow waters of the Western Approaches. On the 15th, the group were investigating the sighting of a U-boat using its snorkel. HMS Mourne, a ship well known to Mcintyre, was the victim of an acoustic torpedo. After several hours of searching, there was no sign of the U-boat. The subject of the hunt could well have escaped retribution amongst the plethora of wrecks which litter the floor of the English Channel.

===== U-269 =====
On the night of 25 June, after investigating a contact which turned out to be another wreck, Bickerton was hurrying to catch up with the rest of the group when she detected an echo, subsequently identified as U-269. Mcintyre had been asleep in his cabin beneath the bridge and initially took some convincing that the target was genuine. All doubt was swept aside when, after a look at the plotting table, it became apparent that the target had moved some distance. Bickerton moved into the attack and fired a pattern of depth charges. The U-boat was forced to the surface, where it was immediately engaged by Bickerton's guns. The crew abandoned ship – the U-boat sank. It was all over within 10 minutes.

==== The sinking of Bickerton ====
Bickerton was sent north to Scapa Flow in July 1944 to join the Home Fleet once more. On 18 August she was acting as part of the screen for the cruiser Kent and two aircraft carriers, Nabob and Trumpeter in the southern Arctic Ocean. Nabob was torpedoed without warning; Macintyre had just given the order for all screening ships to deploy their CAT noise-makers (to seduce any acoustic torpedoes away from the ships), when Bickerton was also hit. Most of the stern, including the quarterdeck, had disappeared. Due to the importance attached to saving Nabob and the proximity of the German-held Norwegian coast, it was decided to sink Bickerton with a torpedo from a destroyer. Macintyre was transferred to the Aylmer.

==== Return to naval aviation ====
Macintyre was taken off sea duty. With hindsight he acknowledged that he was "ready for this". The change in the nature of anti-submarine warfare, with U-boats switching to lone-wolf attacks in coastal areas, required different tactics and was "best left to fresher men". Macintyre sensed it was "time to go" and returned to aviation, ending the war as commander of a naval air station.

=== Later life 1945–1981 ===
Macintyre left the Navy after the war, forging a successful career as a historian and author. He published an autobiography, U-Boat Killer, in 1956, and followed it with 15 books on various aspects of naval history.

In 1955, Macintyre returned Otto Kretschmer's binoculars, which he had kept in 1941. At the time, Kretschmer was president of the Deutscher Marinebund, a member club of the International Maritime Confederation.

== Assessment ==
Macintyre was a highly successful U-boat killer, a soubriquet he took as the title of his autobiography. He was responsible for the destruction of six U-boats during the Second World War, making him one of the highest scoring ASW commanders.

He was also an equally successful escort commander, taking seriously the "fateful instructions that" 'the safe and timely arrival of the convoy' "was our main objective".

Over a two-year period with B-2, Macintyre commanded the escorts for 28 convoys, a total of 1100 ships, with the loss of just two. The vast majority (99.8%), arrived safely, a record of which Macintyre was justifiably proud, although he was "in a fury" at the loss of the two ships when escorting SC 129.

== Awards ==
Macintyre was also highly decorated for his service, winning the Distinguished Service Order with two bars and the Distinguished Service Cross.

== Books by Captain Macintyre ==
- U-Boat Killer (1956) Rigel Publications ISBN 0548440107
- Destroyer Man (1957) With Rear-Admiral A. F. Pugsley. Weidenfeld & Nicolson ASIN: B0007J4L6S
- Jutland (1958) Norton OCLC 4676376
- Narvik (1960) Norton OCLC 394826
- The Thunder of the Guns: A Century of Battleships (1960) W.W.Norton OCLC 826016
- Fighting Admiral (1961) Evans Bros OCLC 1101338
- The Battle of the Atlantic (1961) Macmillan OCLC 1214473
- Admiral Rodney (1962) Peter Davies
- Wings of Neptune: The Story of Naval Aviation (1964) W.W.Norton OCLC 1002027
- Fighting Under The Sea (1965) Evans Bros
- The Battle for the Pacific (1966) Norton OCLC 24612308
- Trafalgar: Nelson's Great Victory (1968) ISBN 0-7188-1394-4
- Aircraft Carrier: The Majestic Weapon (1968) Ballantine Books Inc. ISBN 9780345018434
- The Naval War Against Hitler Scribner (1971) ISBN 0-684-12375-4 OCLC 161506
- The Privateers (1972) ISBN 0-236-15498-2
- Sea Power in The Mediterranean (1972) ISBN 0-213-99456-9
- The Adventure of Sail, 1520–1914 (1974) ISBN 0-236-17641-2
- Famous Fighting Ships (1975) ISBN 0-600-35486-5
- Famous Sea Battles (1977) ISBN 0-600-38066-1
- Sea Warfare 1939–1945 (History of the World Wars) (1977) Phoebus ASIN: B00126QH26
