= Escort Group B2 =

- Allegiance: British Empire
- Branch: Royal Navy
- Type: Escort Group
- Role: Anti-submarine warfare
- Size: ~9 ships
- Part of: Western Approaches Command
- Garrison/HQ: Lisahally
- March: "The Zumba Zumba Za".
- Engagements: Convoy HX 219; Convoy SC 118; Convoy ONS 4 Convoy SC 129

Commanders
- Notable commanders: Donald MacIntyre

Escort Group B2 was a convoy escort British formation of the Royal Navy which saw action during the Second World War, principally in the Battle of the Atlantic. The group was under the command of Cdr Donald Macintyre, one of Britain's most successful anti-submarine warfare commanders.

== Formation ==
Escort Group B2 was one of seven British escort groups which served with the Mid-Ocean Escort Force (MOEF), which provided convoy protection in the most dangerous midsection of the North Atlantic route.

The group was formed in the spring of 1942 and originally consisted of the Havant-class destroyer Hesperus as group leader with the Town-class destroyer Leamington, V-class destroyer Veteran, and the Flower-class corvettes Gentian, Clematis, Sweetbriar and Vervain.

Later in the year the low-endurance destroyers Leamington and Veteran were replaced by longer-ranged V and W-class destroyers Vanessa and Whitehall and the Flower-class corvettes Heather, Campanula, and Mignonette joined the group.

== Service history ==
The group commenced convoy escort duties in April 1942, in the critical mid-ocean section of the North Atlantic route, operating between Londonderry and St John's Newfoundland.

The first convoys, in the spring of 1942, were uneventful and as the pace of the Battle of the Atlantic heated up in the summer and autumn the group's convoys were escorted without loss.

In October 1942, Convoy ON 138 came under attack but a vigorous defence by B2 ensured no ships were lost. In December 1942 it was accompanying Convoy HX 219 when the convoy came under attack. Hesperus responded and counter-attacked and destroyed U-357 by ramming it, putting Hesperus out of action for two months.

In February 1943 a depleted B2 under temporary command of Cdr Proudfoot escorted Convoy SC 118. This convoy came under attack by the wolfpack gruppe Pfeil (arrow) and lost eight ships for three U-boats destroyed in one of the hardest fought battles of the campaign.

In April during an attack on Convoy ONS 4, ships of the group sank U-191.

In May in an attack on Convoy SC 129, B2 sank U-186 and damaged U-402 and U-223 for the loss of two ships.

A series of uneventful convoys followed, as the U-boat arm withdrew from the North Atlantic after Black May, a state of affairs which continued until the end of the year.

During this period the group had escorted over 30 convoys, totalling over 900 ships of which only ten were lost. No warships were lost from the group, which accounted for three U-boats destroyed and two others damaged and shared in the destruction of three others, in its two years of operation.

=== U-boats destroyed ===
- U-357, sunk by Hesperus and Vanessa on 26 December 1942
- U-191, sunk by Hesperus on 23 April 1943
- U-186 sunk by Hesperus on 12 May 1943

=== Convoys escorted ===
Outbound	Homebound
ON 83	SC 81
ON 97	SC 86
On 107	HX 198
ON 118	HX 203
ON 128	HX 208
ON 138	HX 213
ON 148	HX 219
ON 159	SC 118
ON 170	SC 123
ONS 4	SC 129
ONS 9	SC 134
ONS 13	SC138
ON 198	SC141
KMS 28	MKS 27
ONS 22	HX 267
ONS 25	HX 273
SL 157	.

=== Senior Officer Escort ===
From	To	Captain
April 1942	April 1944	Cdr Donald MacIntyre
