= 5th Escort Group (Royal Navy) =

- Active: March 1941-December 1941
- Country: United Kingdom
- Allegiance: British Empire
- Branch: Royal Navy
- Type: Escort Group
- Role: Anti-Submarine Warfare
- Size: ~7 ships
- Part of: Western Approaches Command
- Garrison/HQ: Lisahally
- Engagements: Convoy HX 112

Commanders
- Notable commanders: Cdr D MacIntyre

5th Escort Group was a British formation of the Royal Navy which saw action during the Second World War, principally in the Battle of the Atlantic.

== Formation ==
5th Escort Group (5 EG) was formed in March 1941, one of the earliest escort groups to be set up. Led by Commander Donald MacIntyre as Senior Officer Escort (SOE) in HMS Walker, 5 EG comprised the V-class destroyers Vanoc and Volunteer, the S-class destroyer Sardonyx and Scimitar and the Flower-class corvettes Bluebell and Hydrangea.

== Service history ==
The 5th EG's first action was a major convoy battle in defence of Convoy HX 112 in March 1941. This saw the loss of 5 ships but also the destruction of two U-boats U-99 and U-100, commanded by leading U-boat aces Otto Kretschmer and Joachim Schepke. The 5th EG continued on escort duty in the North Atlantic but this became uneventful due to a loss of U-boat effectiveness in the summer of 1941. Three U-boat aces were sunk in March and the Allied code-breakers at Bletchkey Park penetrated the U-boat Enigma code after April. In June the 5th EG moved to escort south- and north-bound convoys to and from Gibraltar and the South Atlantic. These too were successful, despite the threat across the Bay of Biscay of air and U-boat attack. In October 1941 the 5th EG returned to the North Atlantic. The group underwent several changes, as ships were transferred or were docked for extended repair. In December 1941 Macintyre was posted to Argentia as liaison officer and as all the ships had become worn out, the 5th EG was disbanded after nine months service. During this period the 5th EG had escorted over two dozen convoys, totalling over 700 ships of which 12 were lost. No warships were lost from the group, which accounted for two U-boats .

== Table: convoys escorted ==
Outbound	Homebound
.	HX 112
OG 57	.
OB 308	HX 118
OB 311	HX 120
OB 312	HX 122
OB 322	HX 125A
OB 327	HX 128
OB 333	HG 64
OG 66	SL 77
OG 68/OS 1	HG 68
.	SL 82
OS 4	SL 85/HG 72
ON 20	SC 46
ON 27	HX 115
ON 34	SC 53
.	HX 162
