= HMS Sardonyx =

Royal Navy S class destroyer

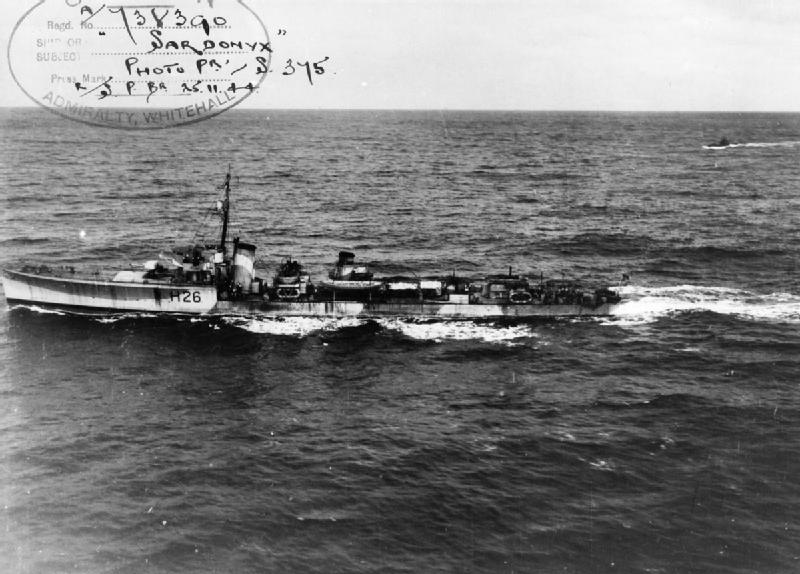
- Sardonyx in 1944

History

United Kingdom
- Name: Sardonyx
- Namesake: Sardonyx
- Ordered: June 1917
- Builder: Stephen, Linthouse
- Laid down: 25 March 1918
- Launched: 27 May 1919
- Completed: 12 July 1919
- Out of service: 23 June 1945
- Fate: Sold to be broken up

General characteristics
- Class & type: S-class destroyer
- Displacement: 1,075 long tons (1,092 t) normal; 1,221 long tons (1,241 t) deep load
- Length: 265 ft (80.8 m) p.p.
- Beam: 26 ft 8 in (8.13 m)
- Draught: 9 ft 10 in (3.00 m) mean
- Installed power: 3 Yarrow boilers, 27,000 shp (20,000 kW)
- Propulsion: 2 geared Brown-Curtis steam turbines, 2 shafts
- Speed: 36 knots (41.4 mph; 66.7 km/h)
- Range: 2,750 nmi (5,090 km) at 15 kn (28 km/h)
- Complement: 90
- Armament: 3 × single QF 4 in (102 mm) guns; 1 × single 2-pdr 40 mm (1.6 in) AA gun; 2 × twin 21 in (533 mm) torpedo tubes; 4 × depth charge chutes

HMS Sardonyx was a British Admiralty S-class destroyer that served with the Royal Navy from soon after the First World War to the end of the Second World War. The S class was a development of the First World War-era R class, designed as a cheaper alternative to the V and W classes that had followed them. The ships shared their predecessor's main armament of three 4 in (102 mm) guns and four 21 in (533 mm) torpedo tubes. Launched in 1919 soon after the armistice, Sardonyx was initially commissioned into the Reserve Fleet. Later that year, the destroyer was sent to Latvia, arriving just after the cessation of that country's war of independence. Returning to reserve soon after, the vessel was placed back in service to help in the successive searches for the missing submarines M1 in 1925 and M2 in 1932 and, in 1935, assisted in the rescue of the steamer Brompton Manor in stormy weather near Selsey Bill on the English southern coast.

Sardonyx took part in radar trials in 1939, and was updated shortly after the start of the Second World War with greater anti-aircraft and anti-submarine capabilities. The torpedo tubes were replaced by depth charge throwers and all the main armament but the forecastle gun was removed. A Type 286M radar was also fitted, although successive antennas proved vulnerable to storms and were lost. Throughout 1940, Sardonyx provided escort to convoys in the Western Approaches. The vessel was also called upon to support single ships, like the damaged liner RMS Empress of Britain, although in that case the liner was sunk by the German submarine U-32.

In 1941, the ship joined the Fifth Escort Group, which destroyed the German submarines U-99 and U-100, although Sardonyx did not claim any hits. Increasingly, the destroyer was able to escort convoys without losing a merchant ship to submarine attack, a distinction that continued into the following year. Simultaneously, increasing availability of more modern escorts meant that there was less need for older vessels while the harsh conditions of service meant that the destroyer was increasingly spending time in repair rather than operations. Sardonyx dropped from covering twenty convoys in 1942 to nine in 1943. After being involved in escorting the landing parties for the Normandy landings in 1944, the vessel was briefly allocated to training before being retired and sold to be broken up in 1945.

== Design and development ==
Sardonyx was one of thirty-six S class ordered by the British Admiralty during the First World War in June 1917 as part of the Twelfth War Construction Programme. They were built to a design specified by the Admiralty and so were known as "Admiralty destroyers". This design was a development of the R class that were also built to an Admiralty specification. The S-class destroyers were to be introduced at the same time as, and as a cheaper and faster alternative to, the V and W classes. They were to serve as general-purpose ships in the Harwich Force while the more powerful V and W classes would be deployed to support the Grand Fleet at Scapa Flow. Differences from the R class were minor, such as having the searchlight moved aft and the ability to mount an additional pair of torpedo tubes. The destroyers were known as the Modified Trenchard or S class, as the majority were named starting with the letter S.

Sardonyx had an overall length of 276 ft (84 m) and a length of 265 ft (81 m) between perpendiculars. Beam was 26 ft 8 in (8.13 m) and mean draught 9 ft 10 in (3.00 m). Displacement was 1,075 long tons (1,092 t) normal and 1,221 long tons (1,241 t) deep load. Three Yarrow boilers vented through two funnels. They fed steam to two sets of Brown-Curtis geared steam turbines rated at 27,000 shaft horsepower (20,000 kW) and driving two shafts, giving a design speed of 36 knots (41 mph; 67 km/h) at normal loading and 32.5 knots (37.4 mph; 60.2 km/h) at deep load. A full load of 301 long tons (306 t) of fuel oil was carried, which gave a design range of 2,750 nautical miles (5,090 km; 3,160 mi) at 15 knots (17 mph; 28 km/h). The ship had a complement of 90 officers and ratings.

Armament as constructed consisted of three single QF 4 in (102 mm) Mk IV guns on the ship's centreline. One was mounted raised on the forecastle, one on a platform between the funnels and one aft. The ship also mounted a single 2-pounder 40 mm (1.6 in) "pom-pom" anti-aircraft gun. Four 21 in (533 mm) torpedo tubes were carried in two twin rotating mounts aft. Four depth charge chutes were also fitted aft. Typically ten depth charges were carried. The ship was designed to mount two additional 18 in (457 mm) torpedo tubes on either side of the superstructure but this required the forecastle plating to be cut away, making the vessel's crew more vulnerable to spray, so they were removed before the vessel entered service. The weight saved enabled the heavier Mark V 21-inch torpedo to be carried. Fire control included a training-only director that helped aim the guns as they transversed, a single Dumaresq analogue computer and a Vickers range clock.

== Construction and career ==
Laid down on 25 March 1918 in the final year of the First World War by Alexander Stephen and Sons at their dockyard in Linthouse, Glasgow, Sardonyx was launched on 27 May the following year and completed on 12 July. The vessel was the first Royal Navy vessel to bear the name of the semi-precious stone. With the end of the war, the Royal Navy returned to a peacetime level of strength and both the number of ships and personnel needed to be reduced to save money. Even after withdrawing all its pre-war destroyers, the Royal Navy still found there were more ships available than it needed for active service. Sardonyx was commissioned into the Reserve Fleet.

=== Interwar service ===
Although the war on the Western Front had finished with the signing of the Armistice, the escalating civil war in Russia continued and there was unrest in the Baltic Sea. This reached a peak when the people of Latvia declared independence, which was achieved on 14 November 1919 after a war of independence. Sardonyx was one of the Royal Navy vessels sent to monitor the situation during the following month. The ship returned to the United Kingdom and was reduced to reserve on 3 March 1920. In November 1925, Sardonyx was briefly taken out of reserve to take part in search operations to find the missing submarine M1. M1 had been sunk with all hands in a collision on 12 November, but the submarine's wreck was not found until 1967.

On 6 August 1931, Sardonyx was recommissioned at the Royal Navy base in Portsmouth. On 27 January 1932, Sardonyx and sister ship Sabre took part in the search for the missing submarine M2. M2 had sunk the day before. On 17 September 1935, as severe gales struck British waters, the steamer Brompton Manor sent out a distress signal while off the Owers lightvessel, in the English Channel near Selsey Bill on the English southern coast. Sardonyx was ordered from Portsmouth to search for the steamer, which was successfully found later that day. Brompton Manor's captain had been washed overboard by heavy seas, and the ship's cargo shifted, giving a 30-degree list. Sardonyx stood by Brompton Manor until a tug could tow the steamer into the Port of Southampton. Sardonyx ran aground off Southsea on 31 January 1938, but was soon refloated and sustained no damage.

In 1939, Sardonyx joined a project to use radar to detect ships. In the initial trials, the destroyer was chosen as one of the targets. Trials in June with a L-band radar with a wavelength of 50 cm (20 in) were a qualified success, with ships identified at 5 miles (8 km) and low-flying aircraft at 2.5 miles (4.0 km). Subsequently, Sardonyx was equipped with an experimental 50 cm radar set named the Combined Wireless Rangefinder and Lookout Set, on 14 October. This was not a success as detection of surface targets was inadequate at the expected range. After the trials, it was envisaged that the destroyer would join sister ships Saladin, Scout, Stronghold, Sturdy, Thanet and Thracian at the China Station to form the Singapore and Hong Kong Local Defence Flotilla. However, by the end of the trial, the Second World War had started and the Royal Navy decided to retain the destroyer in British waters. Sardonyx joined the Local Defence Flotilla at Portsmouth.

=== Second World War ===
At the start of the war, the Royal Navy had an immediate requirement for escorts to combat the German submarine threat. This required a rethink of the role of the destroyer, which hitherto had been envisaged by the navy as a member of a flotilla supporting the battleships of the fleet. Along with the ten remaining S-class warships, the destroyer was taken out of service and refitted for the anti-submarine escort role. Alongside Saladin and Shikari, Sardonyx was fitted with a heavier anti-submarine armament. The torpedo tubes were removed, the space allowing for additional depth charges, and two depth charge throwers were fitted alongside new racks aft. 30 charges were carried, although this increased as the war progressed. The midship and aft guns were removed and anti-aircraft defence improved with a high-angle QF 12-pounder gun fitted on a bandstand abaft the forward funnel and two quad-mounted Vickers .50 machine guns mounted on the superstructure for close-in defence. The destroyer re-entered service but, on 31 May 1940, collided with and sank the trawler St Apollo off the Hebrides.

For the majority of the war, Sardonyx acted as a convoy escort. When Convoy HX 79 was attacked by U-47, which subsequently called in a wolfpack of four other boats on 19 October 1940, Sardonyx was one of those sent to protect the convoy. Although 10 Royal Navy warships rushed to the scene, 12 ships in the convoy were sunk. This was the first success for the wolfpacks. On 27 October, the destroyer was sent to escort the stricken liner RMS Empress of Britain, which had been attacked by a Focke-Wulf Fw 200 Condor maritime patrol aircraft. Despite taking evasive manoeuvres, the liner was torpedoed and sunk by the German submarine U-32. During the next five months, the destroyer escorted 15 convoys in the Atlantic Ocean, OB 236, HX 82, OB 239, HX 86, OB 245, HX 99, OB 256, SL/MKS 58, OB 262, HX 106, OB 269, SC 19, OB 278, SL/MKS 62, and OB 283, rarely staying more than one or two days covering the Western Approaches.

The long-term solution was to form Escort Groups with multiple warships. Sardonyx joined the Fifth Escort Group, which was formed in March 1941. On 15 March, the Group, led by Commander Donald Macintyre, joined Convoy HX 112 as an escort. The convoy had been travelling from Halifax, Nova Scotia, since 1 March. As evening fell, the convoy was attacked by a wolfpack including the submarines U-99, U-100 and U-110. Despite losing six merchant ships, the Group successfully destroyed U-99 and U-100, although Sardonyx did not claim any hits. In June, a Type 286M radar was fitted in Londonderry. The antenna proved too heavy for the mast and was lost in a gale, as was the replacement within two months. On 16 August, Sardonyx was part of the Eighth Escort Group that formed the eastern ocean escort for convoy HX 143. On 4 October, the Group again safely accompanied ON(S) 23 across to rendezvous with escorts from the Royal Canadian Navy. On 1 November the Group escorted the 42 ships of ON 30 until handing them to destroyers from the US Navy. The role was reciprocated on 15 November when the Group received HX 160 from a US Navy escort. No merchant ship was lost in any of these operations. In all, the destroyer escorted 26 convoys during 1941.

The following year saw a similar pattern. Between 14 and 16 February, Sardonyx formed part of the Second Escort Group that accompanied Convoy ON 66 on the first stage of its journey. Once again, no ships were lost. On 22 February, the destroyer, alongside sister ship Saladin, joined the escort for SC.69 from Halifax, bringing the convoy safely into Liverpool three days later. The destroyer subsequently escorted five UR convoys travelling between Loch Ewe and Reykjavík, six RU convoys travelling back, three WS convoys sailing south, MKS 3Y from Philippeville, SL/MKS 103 from Freetown, and TA 21, AT 22, TA 22 and HX 206 crossing between Britain and North America. During this time, the destroyer was upgraded again with four single Oerlikon 20 mm cannon replacing the Vickers machine guns and allocated, along with five remaining sister ships, to the Twenty-First Escort Group. It was hoped that keeping the warships together would help them operationally.

However, like all the remaining S class, Sardonyx was beginning to show the strains of age, exacerbated by the demands of service in the North Atlantic and the impact of a relatively large armament on a small hull. After each deployment, when the ship returned to harbour, it was rare that there was not some damage from bad weather. This meant that the destroyer increasingly spent more time in repair rather than service. As a consequence, the vessel was one of the more popular with serving sailors as they were able to spend more time off-duty ashore. Amongst the crew at the time was the future Admiral of the Fleet Henry Leach, who served as a midshipman before being promoted to sub-lieutenant on 1 October 1942. Another crew member was an American volunteer, Derek Lee, who served as a deck officer with the collateral job of security officer. His role included censoring photographs, such as those portraying the survivors of the merchant ship SS Yorktown, sunk by U-619 on 28 September 1942, taken as they climbed aboard the destroyer.

The start of 1943 saw more dedicated escorts enter service, allowing older vessels like Sardonyx to be moved to less demanding roles. The destroyer, along with sister ship Scimitar, took the merchant ship Leinster to Iceland from 21 to 23 January and back to the Clyde from 25 to 27 January. The same pattern repeated three more times over the next seven months. In addition to escorting single vessels, Sardonyx accompanied the larger convoy WS 30 on the first two days of its journey to Freetown on 19 and 20 May. This proved to be the last convoy of more than one merchant ship that the destroyer would escort. Alongside Sabre, Saladin and Scimitar, Sardonyx took part in Operation Rosegarden in June 1943, an attempt to strike at German submarines transiting the gap between Iceland and Scotland. The operation was unsuccessful as the ageing destroyers were unable to sustain speed in the severe weather, and a similar deployment the following summer was cancelled. On 8 June 1944, the destroyer escorted ships carrying the troops who participated in the recapture of France in Operation Overlord after the Normandy landings.

In October, the ship was withdrawn from operational service and allocated to training at Preston. The destroyer joined sister ship Shikari, attached to the Third Submarine Flotilla to train submarine crews. Following the end of the war in Europe, Sardonyx was retired and, on 23 June 1945, handed over to be broken up by Thos. W. Ward at Inverkeithing.

== Pennant numbers ==
Pennant number	Date
F34	June 1919
D95	November 1919
F53	December 1920
H26	January 1922
