= HMS Vanessa (D29) =

Destroyer of the Royal Navy

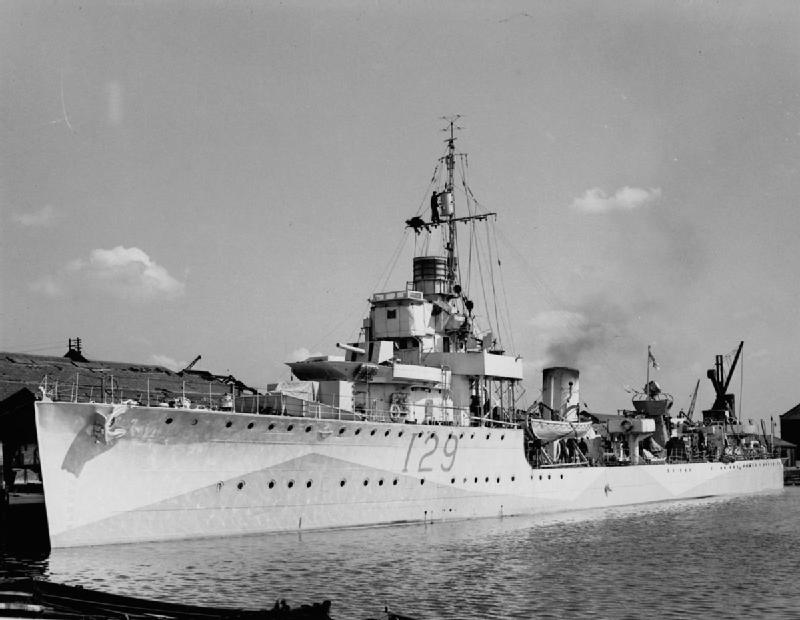
- HMS Vanessa (I29) docked at Blackwell during World War II.

History

United Kingdom
- Name: HMS Vanessa
- Ordered: 30 June 1916
- Builder: William Beardmore and Company, Dalmuir
- Laid down: 10 May 1917
- Launched: 16 March 1918
- Sponsored by: Mrs. Frederick Elvy
- Completed: 21 June 1918
- Commissioned: 1918
- Decommissioned: December 1921
- Recommissioned: 1939
- Decommissioned: 1945
- Motto: Quandmeme J'arrive ("I get there when I arrive")
- Honours and awards: Battle honour for Atlantic 1939-1943
- Fate: Sold for scrapping 4 March 1947; Scrapping began February 1949
- Badge: A blue butterfly on a white field

General characteristics
- Class & type: Admiralty V-class destroyer
- Displacement: 1,272-1,339 tons
- Length: 300 ft (91.4 m) o/a, 312 ft (95.1 m) p/p
- Beam: 26 ft 9 in (8.2 m)
- Draught: 9 ft (2.7 m) standard, 11 ft 3 in (3.4 m) deep
- Propulsion: 3 Yarrow type Water-tube boilers; Brown-Curtis steam turbines; 2 shafts, 27,000 shp
- Speed: 34 kn
- Range: 320-370 tons oil, 3,500 nmi at 15 kn, 900 nmi at 32 kn
- Complement: 110
- Armament: 4 × QF 4 in Mk.V (102mm L/45), mount P Mk.I; 2 × QF 2 pdr Mk.II "pom-pom" (40 mm L/39) or; 1 z QF 12 pdr 20 cwt Mk.I (76 mm), mount HA Mk.II; 4 (2x2) tubes for 21 in torpedoes
- Notes: Pennant number: D29

HMS Vanessa (D29) was a V-class destroyer of the British Royal Navy that was in service during World War I and World War II.

== Construction and commissioning ==
Vanessa, the second Royal Navy ship and first major warship of the name, was ordered on 30 June 1916 as part of the 9th Order of the 1916–17 Naval Programme. She was laid down 10 May 1917 by William Beardmore and Company at Dalmuir, Scotland, and launched on 16 March 1918, christened by Mrs. Frederick Elvy. She was completed on 21 June 1918 and commissioned into service.

== Service history ==
=== World War I and interwar years ===
Vanessa saw service in the last months of World War I, during which time she was credited with taking part in the sinking German submarine UB 107. On 27 July Vanessa was on patrol off Scarborough with a group of ASW trawlers and motor launches when the U-boat was sighted by one of the launches. After a determined search in bad weather the U-boat broached in full view of the trawler Calvia. A series of depth charges were dropped, after which oil and air bubbles were seen. The following day a headless corpse, wearing a German uniform, was recovered by Vanessa. (Note: Other sources argue that UB 107 escaped this attack, and was lost to unknown causes between this date and 3 August 1918. (See UB 107 at uboat.net; retrieved 28 October 2021)) With the sinking of U-357 in December 1942 this makes Vanessa the only Royal Navy vessel to have sunk a U-boat in both world wars. The war ended with the armistice with Germany on 11 November 1918. She remained in service for a time thereafter, but was decommissioned in December 1921 after serving in the Baltic during the Russian Intervention and placed in reserve at Rosyth Scotland.

=== World War II ===
Vanessa was recommissioned in 1939, and after the United Kingdom entered World War II in September 1939 was assigned to the 17th Destroyer Flotilla at Plymouth for convoy escort and patrol duties in the English Channel and the Southwestern Approaches. She performed her first escort duty when she joined the destroyers Vivacious, Wakeful, and Vanquisher in escorting Convoy GC from the River Clyde. She continued on such duties in the Western Approaches for the rest of 1939 and in the Southwestern Approaches and English Channel from January to July 1940, but took no part in Operation Dynamo, the evacuation of Allied troops from Dunkirk, France. She and the destroyer Gallant were escorting Convoy CW 6 in the English Channel on 13 July 1940 when it came under German air attack shortly after leaving Dover. A bomb dropped by a Junkers Ju 87 from StG 1 landed in the water six yards (5.5 meters) astern of Vanessa knocked her propellers out of service. The destroyer Griffin towed her to port. Vanessa underwent repairs at Chatham Dockyard which were not completed until 4 November 1940.

In December 1940, Vanessa completed her post-repair acceptance trials and was selected for service in the Western Approaches. Accordingly, she reported to Western Approaches Command in January 1941 for convoy defence duty in the North Atlantic Ocean. While on patrol in the North Sea on 19 June 1941, she came under attack by German aircraft, which scored a bomb hit on her amidships. The hit made her boilers explode, blew her forward funnel overboard, killed nine ratings and wounded 17 others, two of them fatally, and caused her to go out of control and collide with the naval trawler Turquoise. The destroyer Vesper took Vanessa under tow and brought her to Great Yarmouth. She was selected in July 1941 for conversion to a long-range escort, the conversion to take place while she was under repair for her bomb damage. She entered the Green and Silley Weir Shipyard in London in August 1941 for repairs and conversion, which were not complete until the spring of 1942. While undergoing repairs and conversion, she was "adopted" by the civil community of Barry, Glamorgan, Wales, in December 1941 in a Warship Week National Savings campaign.

After completing post-conversion trials in July 1942, Vanessa began work-ups for North Atlantic convoy escort duty and was assigned to the 2nd Escort Group, in which she joined the destroyers Hesperus and Whitehall and the corvettes Campanula, Clematis, Gentian, Heather, Mignonette, and Sweetbriar. In October 1942 she escorted Convoy HX 213, and in early November 1942 left HX 213 to join the escort of Convoy SC 107. On 3 November 1942, she and the corvette Celandine drove off attacks by German submarines after submarine radio transmissions were detected near SC 107.

On 26 December 1942, Vanessa and Hesperus were escorting Convoy HX 219 when they detected the German submarine U-357 and used depth charges to force her to the surface northwest of Ireland, after which Hesperus rammed and sank the submarine at 57°10′00″N 015°40′00″W. The destroyers rescued seven members of U-357's crew.

In January 1943, Vanessa underwent repairs for structural damage, then rejoined the 2nd Escort Group. In February 1943 she joined Campanula, Mignonette, the destroyers Beverley and Vimy, the corvette Abelia, the Free French Naval Forces corvette FFL Lobelia, and the United States Coast Guard Cutter USCGC Bibb in escorting Convoy SC 118. On 4 February 1943 the convoy's escorts detected and responded to radio transmissions by German submarines, and the German Pfeil ("Arrow") and Haudegen ("Warhorse") submarine groups kept the convoy under attack until 9 February 1943.

Vanessa remained on North Atlantic convoy duty through the remainder of 1943, but toward the end of the year the Royal Navy selected her for withdrawal from combat service. Accordingly, she was withdrawn from service in January 1944 and from February to June 1944 underwent conversion for duty as an air target ship for use in training air crews. She entered service as a target ship in July 1944 and continued in such duties until the armistice with Japan brought World War II to an end on 15 August 1945.

== Decommissioning and disposal ==
Later in 1945, Vanessa was decommissioned and placed in reserve. She was sold on 4 March 1947 to BISCO for scrapping and arrived at the shipbreaker's yard at Charlestown, Fife, Scotland, in February 1949.

== Bibliography ==
- Campbell, John (1985). Naval Weapons of World War II. Annapolis, Maryland: Naval Institute Press. ISBN 0-87021-459-4.
- Chesneau, Roger, ed. (1980). Conway's All the World's Fighting Ships 1922–1946. Greenwich, UK: Conway Maritime Press. ISBN 0-85177-146-7.
- Colledge, J. J.; Warlow, Ben (2006) [1969]. Ships of the Royal Navy: The Complete Record of All Fighting Ships of the Royal Navy from the 15th Century to the Present (3rd Rev ed.). London: Chatham Publishing. ISBN 978-1-86176-281-8. OCLC 67375475.
- Cocker, Maurice. Destroyers of the Royal Navy, 1893–1981. Ian Allan. ISBN 0-7110-1075-7.
- Friedman, Norman (2009). British Destroyers From Earliest Days to the Second World War. Annapolis, Maryland: Naval Institute Press. ISBN 978-1-59114-081-8.
- Gardiner, Robert & Gray, Randal, eds. (1985). Conway's All the World's Fighting Ships 1906–1921. Annapolis, Maryland: Naval Institute Press. ISBN 0-85177-245-5.
- Kemp, Paul (1997). U-Boats Destroyed, German submarine losses in the World Wars. Arms and Armour. ISBN 1-85409-515-3.
- Lenton, H. T. (1998). British & Empire Warships of the Second World War. Annapolis, Maryland: Naval Institute Press. ISBN 1-55750-048-7.
- March, Edgar J. (1966). British Destroyers: A History of Development, 1892–1953; Drawn by Admiralty Permission From Official Records & Returns, Ships' Covers & Building Plans. London: Seeley Service. OCLC 164893555.
- Preston, Antony (1971). 'V & W' Class Destroyers 1917–1945. London: Macdonald. OCLC 464542895.
- Raven, Alan & Roberts, John (1979). 'V' and 'W' Class Destroyers. Man o'War. Vol. 2. London: Arms & Armour. ISBN 0-85368-233-X.
- Rohwer, Jürgen (2005). Chronology of the War at Sea 1939–1945: The Naval History of World War Two (Third Revised ed.). Annapolis, Maryland: Naval Institute Press. ISBN 1-59114-119-2.
- VE Tarrant The U-boat Offensive 1914–1945 (1989) Arms & Armour ISBN 0-85368-928-8
- Whinney, Bob (2000). The U-boat Peril: A Fight for Survival. Cassell. ISBN 0-304-35132-6.
- Whitley, M. J. (1988). Destroyers of World War 2. Annapolis, Maryland: Naval Institute Press. ISBN 0-87021-326-1.
- Winser, John de D. (1999). B.E.F. Ships Before, At and After Dunkirk. Gravesend, Kent: World Ship Society. ISBN 0-905617-91-6.
