= Convoy HX 112 =

Convoy during naval battles of the Second World War

- Part of Second World War
Date	15/17 March 1941
Location	Western Approaches
Result	British victory

Belligerents
(Nazi Germany) Germany	United Kingdom; Canada

Commanders and leaders
(Nazi Germany) Admiral Karl Dönitz	convoy: escort : (United Kingdom) Cdr Donald Macintyre

Strength
5 U-boats	41 ships 6 escorts

Casualties and losses
2 U-boats sunk	6 ships sunk 1 ship damaged

HX 112 was a North Atlantic convoy of the HX series which ran during the battle of the Atlantic in the Second World War. It saw the loss of U-boats commanded by two of the Kriegsmarine's most celebrated commanders and propaganda heroes: U-99 under Otto Kretschmer (POW), and U-100 under Joachim Schepke (KIA).

== Prelude ==
HX 112 was an east-bound convoy of ships which sailed from Halifax on 1 March 1941, making for Liverpool with war materials. Many of the ships in HX 112 were tankers carrying fuel oil to Britain.

It was escorted by 5th Escort Group which consisted of two destroyers, HMS Walker and HMS Vanoc and two corvettes, and was led by Commander Donald Macintyre of HMS Walker. 5th Escort Group was reinforced on this occasion by an additional two destroyers, in view of the importance of the cargo, and met the convoy as it entered the Western Approaches.

On 15 March 1941 HX 112 was sighted by U-110 commanded by Fritz-Julius Lemp, who sent in a sighting report and commenced shadowing the convoy. He was joined throughout the day by four other boats; U-99 (Kretschmer) U-100 (Schepke) U-37 (Clausen) and U-74 (Kentrat).

== Action ==
On the night of 15th/16th the attack started; U-110 was able to torpedo a tanker, which burst into flames, but survived to reach port; all other attacks that night were frustrated by the activities of the escorts.

Keeping up with the convoy on the surface during the day, the pack tried again as night fell on the 16th.

U-99 managed to penetrate the convoy from the north, on its port side, and sank three tankers and a freighter and damaged another tanker in under an hour. Remaining with the central column of the convoy she sank another freighter 15 minutes later before making her getaway.

Meanwhile, the escorts, searching for U-boats outside the convoy perimeter, found U-100 around 1.30am moving in on the surface. She dived, but Walker attacked with a depth charge pattern at close range. U-100 evaded further damage, and surfaced, to be sighted and rammed by Vanoc just after 3am; Schepke was killed when Vanoc smashed into his periscope structure and U-100 went down with most of her crew.

As this was happening, U-99 was making her escape; she nearly collided with a destroyer in the dark and dived. Picked up on ASDIC by Walker, she was depth-charged and severely damaged. Saving U-99 from being crushed as she sank deeper and deeper, Kretschmer brought her to the surface, where she was fired on by the encircling warships. U-99 was sunk, but Kretschmer and most of his crew were saved, to be taken prisoner.

There were no further attacks on HX.112 and the convoy arrived in Liverpool on 20 March.

== Ships in the convoy ==
=== Allied merchant ships ===
A total of 41 merchant vessels joined the convoy, either in Halifax or later in the voyage.

Name	Flag	Tonnage (GRT)	Notes
Ahamo (1926)	United Kingdom	8,621	
Auris (1935)	United Kingdom	8,030	
Beduin (1936)	Norway	8,136	Torpedoed by U-99, Wreck sunk by convoy escort
Bic Island (1917)	United Kingdom	4,000	
Black Condor (1921)	United Kingdom	5,358	
Bonde (1936)	Norway	1,570	Returned
British Commodore (1923)	United Kingdom	6,865	Arrived after collision off Liverpool 20 Mar
British Sincerity (1939)	United Kingdom	8,538	Joined Ex BHX 112
Chaucer (1929)	United Kingdom	5,792	
Cistula (1939)	Netherlands	8,097	Joined Ex BHX 112, Straggled 10 Mar 41
City Of Oxford (1926)	United Kingdom	2,759	
Dalcross (1930)	United Kingdom	4,557	
Diloma (1939)	United Kingdom	8,146	Joined Ex BHX 112
Elona (1936)	United Kingdom	6,192	Joined Ex BHX 112
Erodona (1937)	United Kingdom	6,207	Torpedoed by U-110
Everleigh (1930)	United Kingdom	5,222	
Ferm (1933)	Norway	6,593	Torpedoed by U-99 16 Mar. Wreck sank 21 Mar
Franche-Comté (1936)	United Kingdom	9,314	Damaged by U-99 16 Mar; Storing Hulk
Gloucester City (1919)	United Kingdom	3,071	Straggled 10 Mar 41
Ixion (1912)	United Kingdom	10,263	Joined Ex BHX 112, Straggled 10 Mar
J B White (1919)	Canada	7,375	Sunk by U-99
Katendrecht (1925)	Netherlands	5,099	Joined Ex BHX 112
Korshamn (1920)	Sweden	6,673	Sunk by U-99 16 Mar
Lancaster Castle (1937)	United Kingdom	5,172	
Lima (1918)	Sweden	3,762	
Margarita Chandris (1920)	Greece	5,401	Straggled 10 Mar
Mosli (1935)	Norway	8,291	
Mount Kassion (1918)	Greece	7,914	
Norefjord (1920)	Norway	3,082	
Ocana (1938)	Netherlands	6,256	Joined Ex BHX 112
Oilreliance (1929)	United Kingdom	5,666	Joined Ex BHX 112
Reynolds (1927)	United Kingdom	5,113	
Robert F Hand (1933)	United Kingdom	12,197	Joined Ex BHX 112, Straggled 10 Mar
San Cipriano (1937)	United Kingdom	7,966	Joined Ex BHX 112
Silvercedar (1924)	United Kingdom	4,354	Later torpedoed and lost in Convoy SC 48 on 15 Oct 1941
Stad Haarlem (1929)	Netherlands	4,518	
Tortuguero (1921)	United Kingdom	5,285	
Traveller (1922)	United Kingdom	3,963	Joined Ex BHX 112. Straggled 10 Mar
Trekieve (1919)	United Kingdom	5,244	
Venetia (1927)	United Kingdom	5,728	Sunk by U-99 16 Mar
Westland (1931)	Netherlands	5,888	Straggled 10 Mar, Returned New York City
Winamac (1926)	United Kingdom	8,621	Joined Ex BHX 112. Straggled 10 Mar

=== Convoy escorts ===
A series of armed military ships escorted the convoy at various times during its journey.

Name	Flag	Type	Joined	Left
HMCS Bittersweet	Royal Canadian Navy	Flower-class corvette	10 Mar 1941	10 Mar 1941
HMS Bluebell	Royal Navy	Flower-class corvette	15 Mar 1941	18 Mar 1941
HMCS Fennel	Royal Canadian Navy	Flower-class corvette	10 Mar 1941	10 Mar 1941
HMS Norfolk	Royal Navy	County-class heavy cruiser	05 Mar 1941	14 Mar 1941
Ranpura	Royal Navy	Armed merchant cruiser	10 Mar 1941	14 Mar 1941
HMS Sardonyx	Royal Navy	Admiralty S-class destroyer	15 Mar 1941	19 Mar 1941
HMS Scimitar	Royal Navy	Admiralty S-class destroyer	15 Mar 1941	19 Mar 1941
HMS Syringa	Royal Navy	Minesweeper	15 Mar 1941	18 Mar 1941
HMS Vanoc	Royal Navy	V-class destroyer	15 Mar 1941	20 Mar 1941
HMS Viceroy	Royal Navy	W-class destroyer	15 Mar 1941	15 Mar 1941
HMS Volunteer	Royal Navy	Modified W-class destroyer	16 Mar 1941	20 Mar 1941
HMS Walker	Royal Navy	W-class destroyer	15 Mar 1941	19 Mar 1941

== Conclusion ==
HX.112 had lost six ships totalling 50,000 tons. However, the loss of two of the Kriegsmarine's successful U-boat commanders and propaganda heroes was a severe blow to the Kriegsmarine offensive. The defence of HX.112, coupled with the successful defence of Convoy OB 293 and the loss of U-boat commander Günther Prien along with his sub U-47 the previous week, marked a minor turning point in the Atlantic campaign.

== Bibliography ==
- Stephen Roskill : The War at Sea 1939–1945 Vol I (1954). ISBN (none)
- Dan van der Vat : The Atlantic Campaign (1988). ISBN 0-340-37751-8
- Arnold Hague : The Allied Convoy System 1939–1945 (2000). ISBN (Canada) 1 55125 033 0 . ISBN (UK) 1 86176 147 3
- Kemp, Paul (1997). U-Boats Destroyed, German submarine losses in the World Wars. Arms and Armour. ISBN 1-85409-515-3.
- Niestle, Axel (1998). German U-Boat Losses During World War II. Greenhill. ISBN 1-85367-352-8.
