= Convoy SC 129 =

Convoy during naval battles of the Second World War

- Part of World War II
Date	11–13 May 1943
Location	North Atlantic

Belligerents
Germany	United Kingdom

Commanders and leaders
Admiral Karl Dönitz	Comm: RD Binks; B-2 Group: Cdr. D MacIntyre

Strength
25 U-boats	25 ships 8 escorts

Casualties and losses
1 U-boat destroyed 2 U-boats damaged 53 dead	2 ships sunk (7,627 GRT); 3 dead

SC 129 was a North Atlantic convoy of the SC series which ran during the Battle of the Atlantic in World War II. It was one of several convoy battles that occurred during the crisis month of May 1943.

== Background ==
SC 129 was an east bound convoy of 25 ships, plus local contingents, which sailed from New York on 2 May 1943 bound for Liverpool and carrying war materials.

Mid-Ocean Escort Force group B2 joined the convoy from St. John's, Newfoundland and Labrador on 6 May. Escort group B2 was led by Cdr D MacIntyre in HMS Hesperus; other ships of this group were destroyer HMS Whitehall and five corvettes. They were joined for the voyage by two armed trawlers, plus a convoy rescue ship and an oiler.

Arrayed against them in the North Atlantic were patrol lines Rhein, Elbe and Drossel, though although in the event only Elbe, re-configured and comprising 21 U-boats, engaged SC 129.

== Action ==
First contact with the convoy was made on 11 May by U-504, which called up other boats from Elbe and commenced shadowing. The radio activity alerted the Admiralty to the threat, and they ordered Support Group 5, comprising escort carrier HMS Biter and four destroyers to join. At that time SG 5 was supporting HX 237, under attack by boats from Rhein and Drossel, but was then in range of Coastal Command aircraft, and it was decided SC 129 was in more need.

The report by U-504 had brought up about a dozen U-boats, and on the evening of 11 May one of these, U-402, slipped past the escorts and torpedoed two ships. These were the freighter Antigone, and the Norwegian freighter Grado. Both ships sank, Antigone with the loss of three of her crew. MacIntyre was, in his own words, "furious" that ships under his group's protection had been sunk; in the previous nine months they had escorted tens of convoys without loss. MacIntyre organized a vigorous hunt for the U-boat; she was found by HMS Gentian, attacked with depth charges, and so badly damaged she was forced to abandon her patrol and return to base. Later that night HMS Hesperus got a contact with U-223 and attacked; by depth charge and ramming. U-223 was also so badly damaged she was forced to retire.

On returning to the convoy HMS Hesperus found another U-boat in the early hours of 12 May. This was U-186, tracking the convoy. HMS Hesperus quickly closed in, and as the U-boat crash-dived, attacked with depth charges. This time the boat was destroyed, all hands were lost.

During 12 May the assembled U-boats made over a dozen separate attempts to penetrate the escort screen, but an aggressive defence by the warships, despite being low on fuel and ammunition, prevented any losses.

On 13 May the convoy was joined by HMS Biter and her group; HMS Hesperus and her group were able to re-fuel and re-arm, and HMS Biter was able to mount continuous air patrols. At this BdU saw there was nothing to be achieved, and the attack by the Elbe boats was called off, though they continued to shadow. On 17 May this too was abandoned, and Elbe was disbanded.

During this period, one of the Drossel boats, U-607, encountered a neutral Irish freighter, Irish Oak, on 15 May and despite her clear markings torpedoed her. The incident caused a political controversy in Ireland, as there were allegations that Irish Oak had warned the convoy of the presence of U-boats: This was firmly rejected by her owners and the Irish government. The U-boat commander received a mild reprimand.

SC 129 arrived without further incident in Liverpool on 22 May 1943.

== Aftermath ==
SC 129 was a success for the Allies. Despite the loss of two ships, 23 ships had arrived safely. Added to this, an attack by a wolfpack of 12 U-boats had been beaten off, one U-boat had been destroyed, and two more so badly damaged they had to return to base. The convoy was another in a series of set-backs suffered by the U-boat Arm collectively known as Black May.

== Tables ==
=== Allied ships lost ===
Date	Name	Nationality	Casualties	GRT	Sunk by...
11 May 1943	Antigone	British	3	4,545	U-402
11 May 1943	Grado	Norwegian	none	3,082	U-402

=== U-boats destroyed ===
Date	Number	Type	Location	Casualties	Sunk by...
12 May 1943	U-186	IXC/40	Atlantic, N of the Azores; 41°54′N 31°49′W	53	d/c attack by HMS Hesperus

=== U-boats damaged ===
Date	Number	Type	Location	Hit by...
11 May	U-402	VIIC	Atlantic, NW of the Azores	d/c attack by HMS Gentian
11 May	U-223	VIIC	Atlantic, NW of the Azores	d/c, ramming attack by Hesperus
