= HMS Hesperus =

H-class destroyer

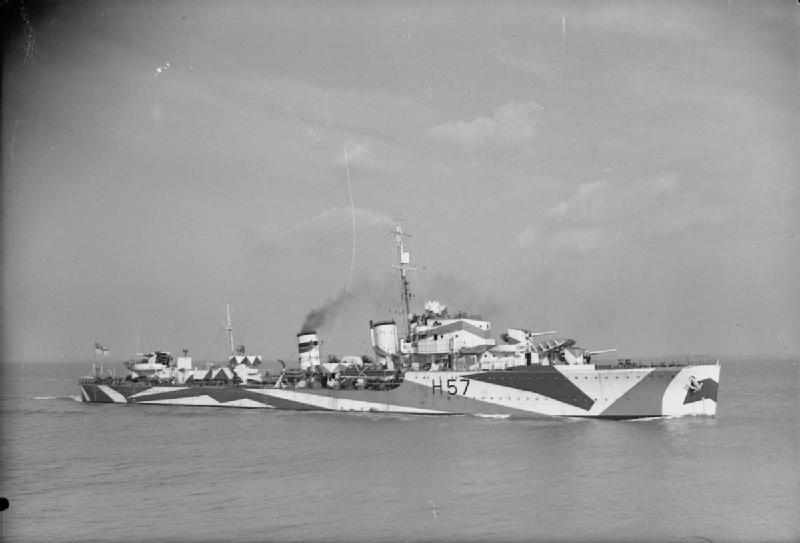
- Profile view of Hesperus

History

Brazil
- Name: Juruena
- Ordered: 6 December 1937
- Builder: John I. Thornycroft & Company
- Laid down: 6 July 1938
- Launched: 1 August 1939
- Fate: Purchased by the United Kingdom, 5 September 1939

United Kingdom
- Name: Hearty (briefly); Hesperus
- Namesake: Hesperus
- Acquired: 5 September 1939
- Commissioned: 22 January 1940
- Renamed: Hesperus, 27 February 1940
- Identification: Pennant number: H57
- Fate: Scrapped, 17 May 1947

General characteristics (as built)
- Class & type: Brazilian H-class destroyer
- Displacement: 1,350 long tons (1,370 t) (standard)
- Length: 323 ft (98.5 m)
- Beam: 33 ft (10.1 m)
- Draught: 12 ft 5 in (3.8 m)
- Installed power: 3 Admiralty 3-drum boilers; 34,000 shp (25,000 kW)
- Propulsion: 2 shafts; 2 geared steam turbines
- Speed: 36 knots (67 km/h; 41 mph)
- Range: 5,530 nmi (10,240 km; 6,360 mi) at 15 knots (28 km/h; 17 mph)
- Complement: 152
- Sensors & processing systems: ASDIC
- Armament: 3 × single 4.7 in (120 mm) guns; 2 × quadruple .50 in (12.7 mm) machine guns; 2 × quadruple 21 in (533 mm) torpedo tubes; 3 × depth charge rails and 8 × throwers; 110 × depth charges

HMS Hesperus was an H-class destroyer that had originally been ordered by the Brazilian Navy with the name Juruena in the late 1930s, but was purchased by the Royal Navy after the beginning of World War II in September 1939, commissioned in 1940 as HMS Hearty and then quickly renamed as Hesperus.

Hesperus was damaged by German aircraft during the Norwegian Campaign in May 1940 and was assigned to convoy escort and anti-submarine patrols after her repairs were completed. She was assigned to the Western Approaches Command for convoy escort duties in late 1940. She was briefly assigned to Force H in 1941, but her anti-aircraft armament was deemed too weak and she was transferred to the Newfoundland Escort Force the next month for escort duties in the North Atlantic. Hesperus was transferred to the Mid-Ocean Escort Force in late 1941 and continued to escort convoys in the North Atlantic for the next three years.

She was converted to an escort destroyer in early 1943 after suffering damage from one of her two ramming attacks that sank German submarines. The ship sank two other submarines during the war by more conventional means. After the end of the war, Hesperus escorted the ships carrying the Norwegian government in exile back to Norway and served as a target ship through mid-1946. She was scrapped beginning in mid-1947.

== Description ==
The warship displaced 1,350 long tons (1,370 t) at standard load and 1,883 long tons (1,913 t) at deep load. The ship had an overall length of 323 feet (98.5 m), a beam of 33 feet (10.1 m) and a draught of 12 feet 5 inches (3.8 m). She was powered by two Parsons geared steam turbines, each driving one shaft using steam provided by three Admiralty 3-drum boilers. The turbines developed a total of 34,000 shaft horsepower (25,000 kW) and gave a maximum speed of 36 knots (67 km/h; 41 mph). Hesperus carried a maximum of 470 long tons (480 t) of fuel oil, giving her a range of 5,530 nautical miles (10,240 km; 6,360 mi) at 15 knots (28 km/h; 17 mph). The ship's complement was 152 officers and ratings.

The vessel was designed for four 45-calibre 4.7-inch Mk IX guns in single mounts, designated 'A', 'B', 'X', and 'Y' from front to rear, but 'Y' gun was removed to compensate for the additional depth charges added. For anti-aircraft (AA) defence, Hesperus had two quadruple Mark I mounts for the 0.5 inch Vickers Mark III machine gun. She was fitted with two above-water quadruple torpedo tube mounts for 21-inch (533 mm) torpedoes. One depth charge rail and two throwers were originally fitted, but this was increased to three sets of rails and eight throwers while fitting-out. The ship's load of depth charges was increased from 20 to 110 as well.

Hesperus was completed without a director-control tower (DCT) so the three remaining 4.7-inch low-angle guns fired in local control using ranges provided by a rangefinder. She was fitted with an ASDIC set to detect submarines by reflections from sound waves beamed into the water.

=== Wartime modifications ===
Hesperus had her rear torpedo tubes replaced by a 12-pounder (3 in (76 mm)) AA gun while under repair in May–June 1940. The ship received a HF/DF radio direction finder mounted on a pole mainmast and a Type 286 short-range surface-search radar during her mid-1941 refit. While under repair at Immingham, she received her DCT. During her early 1942 refit at Falmouth, Cornwall, the ship's short-range AA armament was augmented by two Oerlikon 20 mm (0.8 in) guns on the wings of the ship's bridge. In addition, her recently installed DCT and rangefinder above the bridge were replaced by a Type 271 target indication radar.

While under repair in early 1943, the ship was converted to an escort destroyer. 'A' gun was replaced by a Hedgehog anti-submarine spigot mortar and the .50-calibre machine gun mounts were replaced by a pair of Oerlikons. Additional depth charge stowage replaced the 12-pounder AA gun and Hesperus received the one-ton Mk X depth charge and four Mk IV depth-charge throwers during the same refit. Hesperus was also fitted with the Foxer acoustic decoy to protect her against German acoustically guided torpedoes.

== History ==
She was originally ordered as Juruena on 16 December 1937 by the Brazilian Navy. The ship was laid down by John I. Thornycroft and Company at Woolston, Hampshire on 6 July 1938 and launched by Senhora Heitora Gallienz on 1 August 1939. The ship was purchased by the British on 5 September 1939 after the beginning of World War II. Renamed HMS Hearty, the ship was commissioned on 22 January 1940 under command of former Fleet Air Arm pilot Commander Donald Macintyre. Hearty was renamed Hesperus on 27 February, after the Hesperus of mythology, to avoid confusion with the destroyer Hardy.

The six Brazilian H-class or Havant-class destroyers initially formed the 9th Destroyer Flotilla of the Home Fleet assigned to anti-submarine protection of Scapa Flow. Upon the German occupation of Denmark, Hesperus and her sister Havant were assigned to cover the British occupation of the Faroe Islands in mid-April. During the Norwegian Campaign, Hesperus transported elements of the Scots Guards to Mo i Rana on 15 May and was damaged by near misses from Junkers Ju 87 dive-bombers that same day. The ship was sent to Dundee for repairs that lasted a month. Upon their completion, the ship was assigned to convoy escort and anti-submarine patrol duties.

In November 1940 the 9th Destroyer Flotilla was transferred to the Western Approaches Command and re-designated the 9th Escort Group. On 4 November Hesperus rescued 367 survivors from the sinking of the armed merchant cruiser HMS Laurentic.

In a tropical storm in January 1941, the platform on which 'B' gun was mounted was lifted until the gun pressed against the bridge. After repairs, she resumed her convoy escort duties until April when she was assigned to Force H in Gibraltar whilst Macintyre transferred to the destroyer Walker in March. Hesperus escorted ships during Operations Tiger and Tracer in May and June. Hesperus was transferred out of Force H as her anti-aircraft capability was believed by Admiral James Somerville to be too weak for operations in the Mediterranean. She received a brief refit in Liverpool and was transferred to the Newfoundland Escort Force on 7 July.

In August 1941, Hesperus was one of the destroyers that escorted the battleship Prince of Wales carrying Prime Minister Winston Churchill to the Atlantic Charter meeting with President Franklin D. Roosevelt at Placentia Bay. The ship was structurally damaged by heavy weather and was temporarily repaired by a repair ship in Iceland and then was given permanent repairs at Immingham. Upon their completion Hesperus rejoined the 9th Escort Group before she was attached to Force H in December for convoy duties at Gibraltar.

Together with her sister Harvester, Hesperus sank the German submarine U-208 on 7 December 1941 in the Atlantic west of Gibraltar. On 15 January 1942, whilst defending Convoy HG 78, the ship's radar detected U-93 on the surface and the captain, Lieutenant Commander A. A. Tait, ordered Hesperus to ram. Although a glancing hit, the collision was so violent that it flung the U-boat's captain and first lieutenant from the submarine's conning tower into the motorboat stowed on the destroyer's deck. By dropping depth charges at their shallowest setting and hitting the submarine multiple times with 4.7-inch shells, the submarine's crew was persuaded to abandon ship. Hesperus rescued 40 of the submarine's crew, but was unable to board the submarine before it sank. The impact flooded part of the forward hull, buckled her starboard hull plating and bent the tips of her starboard propeller. She received temporary repairs at Gibraltar and then was given permanent repairs in Falmouth between 9 February and April.

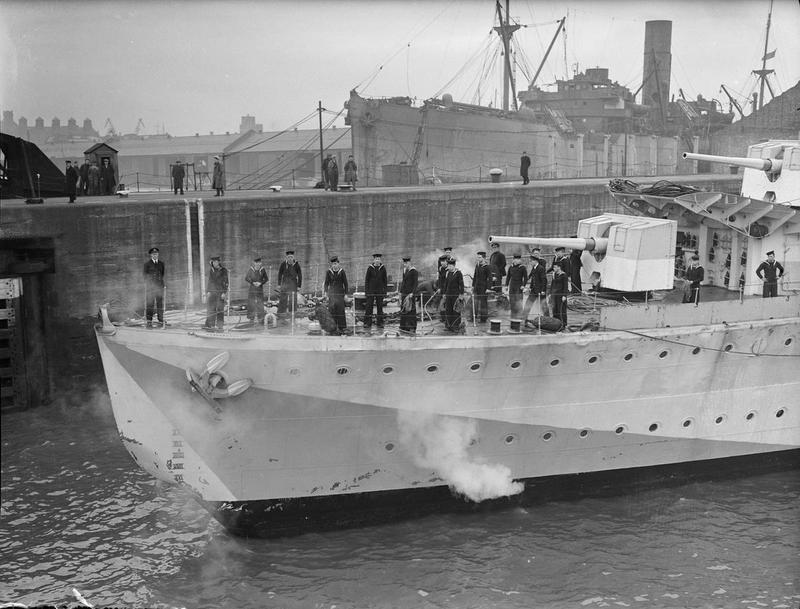
Hesperus showing bow damage on her return to Liverpool 28 December 1942, after she rammed and sank a German U-boat

In March 1942, the remaining five Havant-class destroyers were designated leaders of Escort Groups B-1 through B-5. Commander Tait was transferred to Harvester; and Commander A.F.St.G. Orpen assumed command of Hesperus and B-2 Escort Group when Hesperus completed repairs in April. Commander Macintyre returned to the ship when Orpen was promoted to captain in June. Whilst escorting Convoy HX 219 near Rockall on 26 December, Hesperus and the destroyer Vanessa sank the German submarine U-357 by ramming. This time, the ship's bottom was ripped open for nearly a quarter of her length and she needed three months of repairs in Liverpool.

The ship rejoined her group on 17 March and sank U-191 with her Hedgehog on 23 April 1943 whilst escorting Convoy ONS 4. Almost three weeks later, she sank U-186 whilst defending convoy SC 129 on 12 May 1943. Hesperus remained on convoy escort duties until she was refitted between January and 29 March 1944. Commander G.V. Legassick assumed command of Hesperus in March 1944 and the group escorted convoys between Gibraltar and the United Kingdom. In July 1944 the ship conveyed the body of Captain Frederic John Walker for a sea-burial.

Later in 1944 she was transferred to the 19th Escort Group. In January 1945, Commander R.A. Currie assumed command of Hesperus as commander of the 14th Escort Group, based in Plymouth. On 30 April 1945, the ship, together with her sister Havelock, attacked the wreck of U-246 northwest of the island of Anglesey thinking that it was U-242 which had been spotted by a Short Sunderland flying boat earlier that day.

Two weeks later, Hesperus and the 14th Escort Group escorted a group of surrendered German U-boats from Loch Alsh to Lough Foyle. On 27 May, the ship and her sister Havelock escorted the exiled Norwegian government back to Oslo and remained there until 1 June. Ten days later, she began service as an aircraft target, a role that lasted for the next year. Hesperus was approved for scrapping on 18 February 1946 and was placed in Category C reserve in May. She was towed to Grangemouth for scrapping, but that did not begin until 17 May 1947. Hesperus's ensign was preserved in Yeovil Parish Church.
