= HMS Vanoc =

Destroyer of the Royal Navy

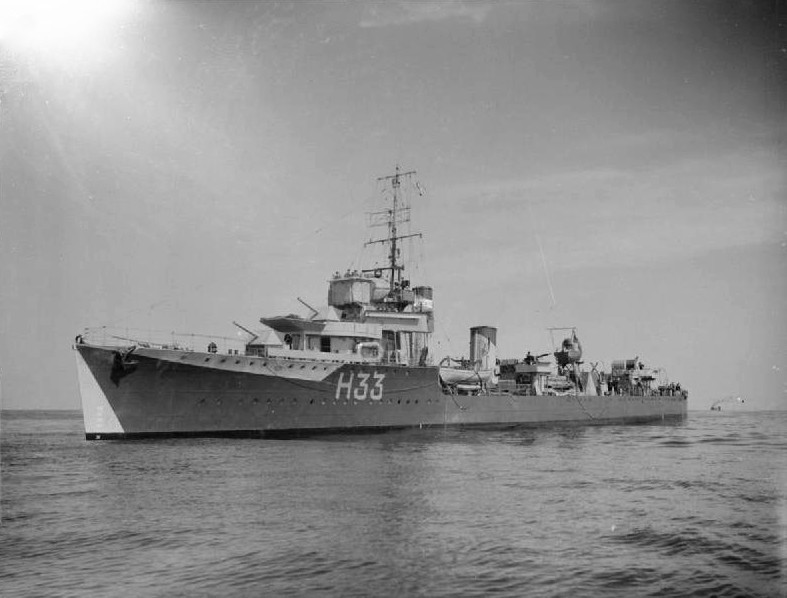
- HMS Vanoc

History

United Kingdom
- Name: HMS Vanoc
- Laid down: 20 September 1916
- Launched: 14 June 1917
- Commissioned: 15 August 1917
- Identification: Pennant number: H33
- Fate: Scrapped in July 1945

General characteristics (see below)
- Class & type: V-class destroyer

HMS Vanoc was a British V-class destroyer, launched in 1917. The ship saw service in both the First and Second World Wars. During the First World War, Vanoc served as part of two destroyer flotillas, undertaking minelayer and convoy escort roles. In 1919, the destroyer took part in British operations in the Baltic as part of Allied efforts to intervene in the Russian Civil War. During the Second World War, Vanoc was involved in evacuation efforts to remove troops from Norway and France, and was utilised as a convoy escort, protecting convoys from German U-boats. In this role, Vanoc sank a German submarine, German submarine U-100 in March 1941 in the Atlantic, and assisted in the destruction of another, German submarine U-99. Three years later, Vanoc was involved in sinking U-392 in the Straits of Gibraltar in concert with a British frigate and several US anti-submarine aircraft. In January 1945, she was involved in a collision with another Allied vessel off Normandy, before being placed into reserve in June. She was later sold for scrap and was broken up after mid-1946.

== Construction ==
In mid-1916, the British Admiralty placed orders for 23 destroyers based on the five V-class leaders that had been ordered earlier that year. Two of these ships, Vanoc and Vanquisher, were ordered from the Clydebank shipyard John Brown & Company in June that year. Vanoc was 312 feet (95.10 m) long overall with a beam of 29 feet 6 inches (8.99 m) and a draught of between 10 feet 8 inches (3.25 m) and 11 feet 7 1/2 inches (3.54 m) depending on load. Displacement was 1,090 long tons (1,110 t) standard and up to 1,490 long tons (1,510 t) under full load.

Three oil-fed Yarrow boilers raising steam at 250 pounds per square inch (1,700 kPa) fed Brown-Curtis geared steam turbines which developed 27,000 shaft horsepower (20,000 kW), driving two screws for a maximum designed speed of 34 knots (63 km/h; 39 mph). Vanoc reached an average speed of 32.083 knots (59.418 km/h; 36.920 mph) during sea trials on 10 August 1917, with her engines generating 28,136 shaft horsepower (20,981 kW) and deep load displacement about 1,430 long tons (1,450 t). The ship carried 368 long tons (374 t) of oil giving a range of 3,500 nautical miles (6,500 km; 4,000 mi) at 15 knots (28 km/h; 17 mph).

Vanoc's main gun armament consisted of four 4-inch Mk V QF guns in four single mounts on the ship's centerline. These were disposed as two forward and two aft in superimposed firing positions. A single QF 3-inch (76 mm) 20 cwt anti-aircraft gun was mounted aft of the second funnel. Aft of the 3-inch gun, she carried four 21 inch (533 mm) torpedo tubes mounted in pairs on the center-line. It was decided in January 1917 to modify Vanoc as a minelayer. As such, the aft set of torpedo tubes and one 4 inch gun could be removed to accommodate up to 66 mines, although the rated capacity was 44. The ship could be converted back to a fleet destroyer, with full armament, in about 12 hours.

Vanoc was laid down at John Brown & Company's Clydebank shipyard on 20 September 1916 and was launched on 14 June 1917. She was commissioned on 15 August 1917 with the pennant number H33. The vessel's name is that of an Arthurian knight in Sir Walter Scott’s The Bridal of Triermain.

=== Modifications ===
Between the wars, modifications to the V-class destroyers were relatively limited, with the twin torpedo mounts generally being replaced by triple mounts as in the W class. As a minelayer, only the forward bank of tubes was replaced, giving Vanoc a five torpedo-tube outfit, while the 3 inch gun was replaced by a 2-pounder "pom-pom".

After the Norwegian campaign, it was decided to strengthen the anti-aircraft armament of Royal Navy destroyers, with the V class being modified by removing the aft bank of torpedo tubes and replacing it by a single 12-pounder anti-aircraft gun, with Vanoc modified by October 1940. Other early modifications included the removal of one 4-inch gun ("Y"-mount) to allow the carrying on a heavy depth charge battery, with 50 charges carried, with the ship fitted to allow 10-charge patterns to be laid, while Type 286M radar was fitted in early 1941. A major problem with the use of destroyers for escort work in the North Atlantic was their lack of endurance, and Vanoc was converted to a long-range escort at Thornycroft's Southampton shipyard between April and November 1943. The long-range escort conversion involved removal of one boiler (and its associated funnel), to allow fitting of additional oil bunkers and extra accommodation to help solve a chronic overcrowding problem that had only got worse as crews had increased as the war progressed. While power dropped to 18,000 shaft horsepower (13,000 kW), cutting speed to 24.5 knots (45.4 km/h; 28.2 mph), the ship's range increased by as much as 600 nautical miles (1,100 km; 690 mi). One 4-inch gun (in "A"-mount) was removed to accommodate a Hedgehog forward-throwing anti-submarine projector, while the remaining set of torpedo tubes and the 12-pounder gun was removed to allow the ship's depth charge armament to be increased again to as many as 150 charges. Radar was changed to a Type 271 surface search radar mounted on the ship's bridge, with a Type 291 air search radar on the mainmast.

== Service ==
=== First World War ===
Following commissioning, Vanoc joined the Thirteenth Destroyer Flotilla, attached to the Battle Cruiser Force of the Grand Fleet. In October 1917, Vanoc was part of a large scale operation involving 30 cruisers and 54 destroyers deployed in eight groups across the North Sea in an attempt to stop a suspected sortie by German naval forces. Despite these countermeasures the two German light cruisers Bremse and Brummer managed to evade the patrols and attacked the regular convoy between Norway and Britain, sinking nine merchant ships and two destroyers, Mary Rose and Strongbow, before returning safely to Germany. Vanoc remained with the Thirteenth Destroyer Flotilla, which formed part of the Battlecruiser Force of the Grand Fleet, until June 1918, when she joined the Twentieth Destroyer Flotilla. The Twentieth Flotilla was a specialised minelaying flotilla, based at Immingham on the Humber, which laid up to 20,000 mines during 1918, as well as carrying out its share of convoy escort and patrol duties. Vanoc herself laid 965 mines during the First World War.

=== Between the wars ===
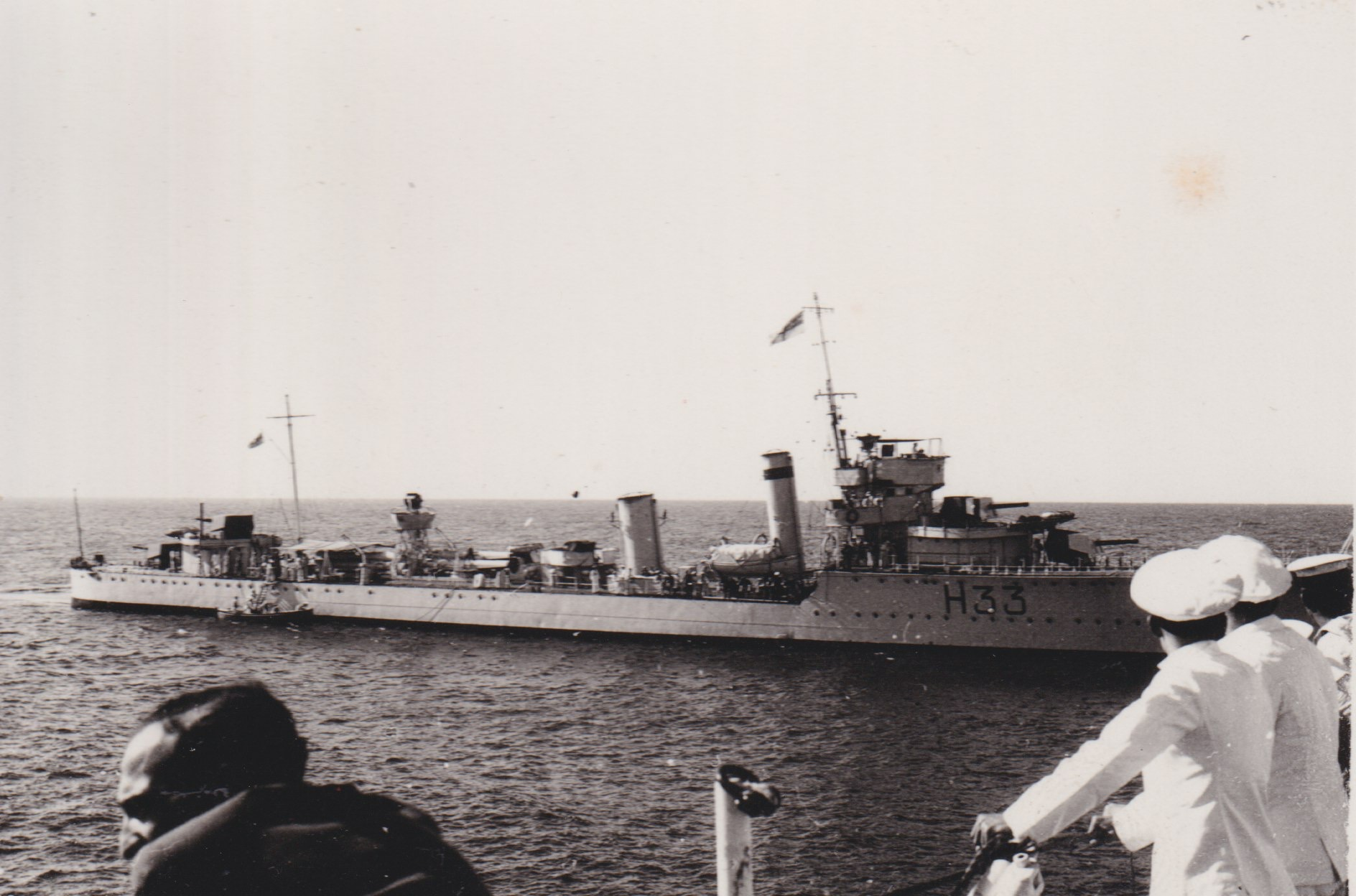
HMS Vanoc, 1938

Vanoc was reduced to 3/5th complement in January 1919, while remaining part of the Twentieth Flotilla. She returned to a full complement on 19 June that year. The Twentieth Flotilla, including Vanoc, was deployed to the Baltic as part of the British intervention in the Russian Civil War. She was off Riga in October 1919 when British and French naval gunfire helped the Latvian army to drive off an attack by the pro-German West Russian Volunteer Army, which was attempting to set up a German-dominated puppet state.

Vanoc was attached to the Second Destroyer Flotilla in November 1919, but was reduced to reserve at Devonport on 5 February 1920. Vanoc was recommissioned in October 1923, serving as a special trials vessel at Portsmouth. In November that year, Vanoc, together with sister ship Vivien carried out rough-weather trials. Vanoc was then used for torpedo trials at HMS Vernon, the Royal Navy's torpedo establishment. From January 1926, she was permanently attached to Vernon.

On 29 June 1927, Vanoc, together with Wrestler, Tilbury and Toreador escorted the battlecruiser HMS Renown, carrying the Duke and Duchess of York into Portsmouth at the end of the royal couple's tour of the Commonwealth.

Vanoc was part of the British Mediterranean Fleet during the Spanish Civil War. Activities during Britain's attempt to enforce non-intervention included ferrying an inspection team to Spanish Morocco in January 1937 to investigate German activities. In June 1938, Vanoc was sent to Alicante in response to Nationalist air attacks on British shipping, while on 30 December 1938, after the Republican destroyer José Luis Díez ran aground at Catalan Bay following an engagement with Nationalist warships, Vanoc patrolled to prevent the Nationalists attacking while José Luis Díez was towed into Gibraltar to be interned.

=== Second World War ===
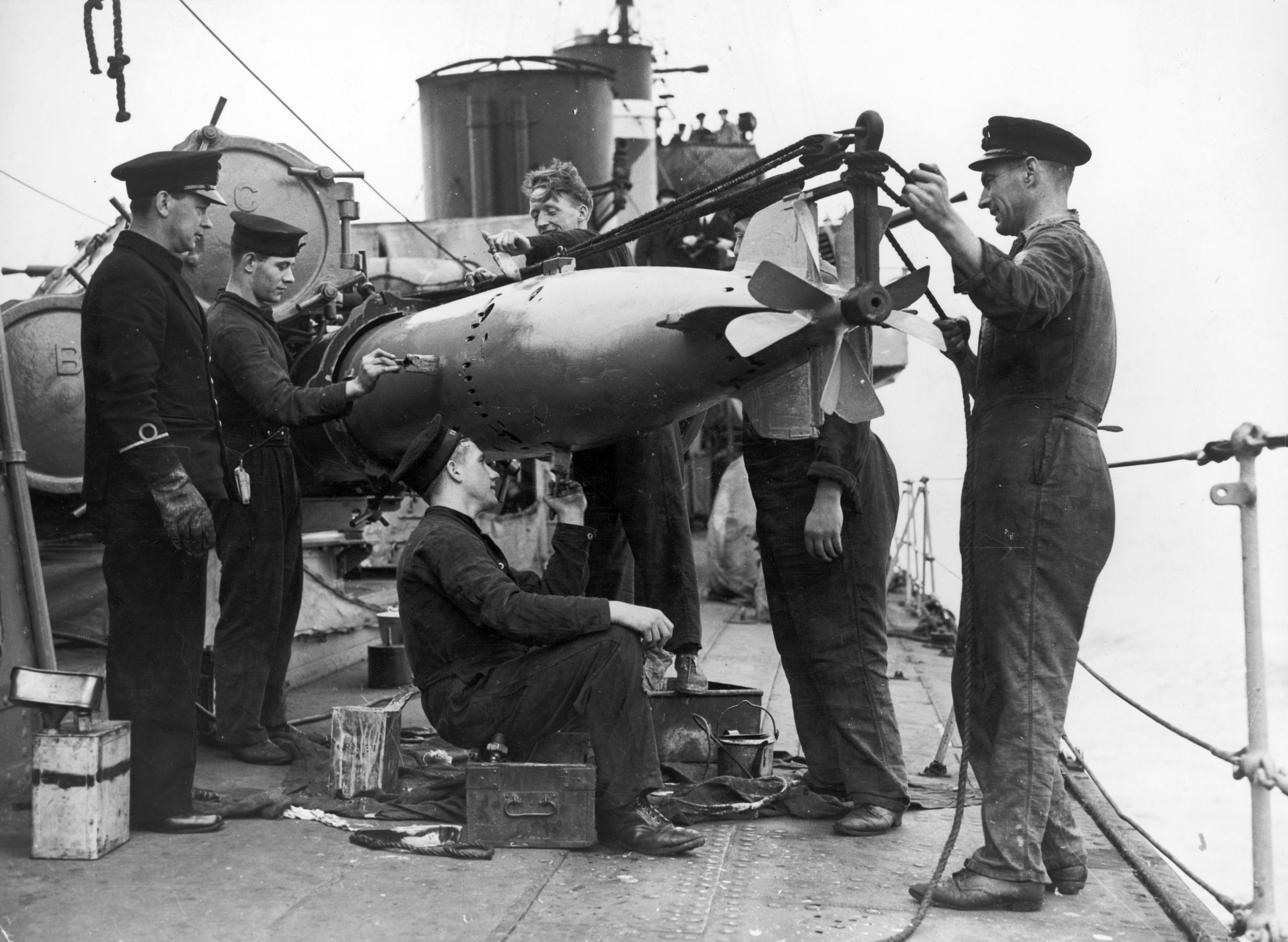
Torpedo loading aboard HMS Vanoc, 1941.

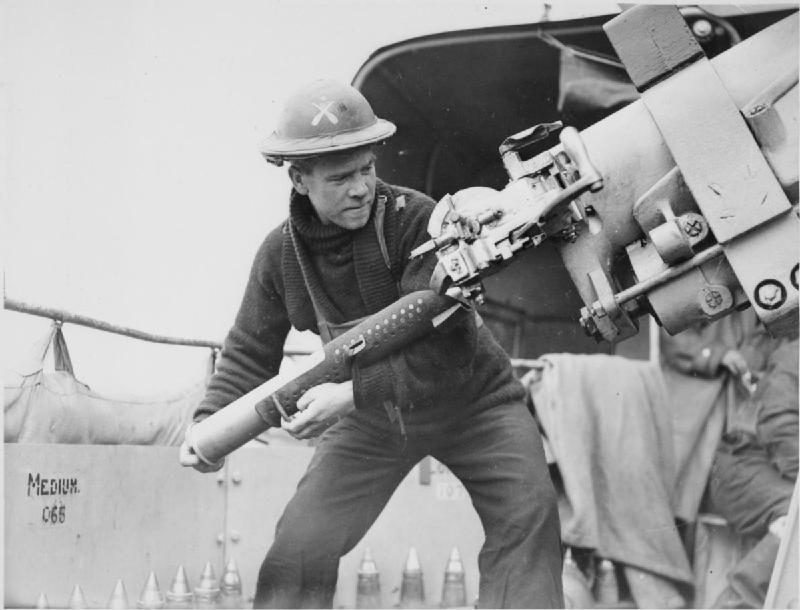
Able Seaman W. Connor loading a 12-pounder AA gun, 1941.

Vanoc was commanded by Lieutenant Commander James Godfrey Wood Deneys from 9 February 1939 to 15 December 1941. At the outbreak of the war, the ship was assigned to the 11th Destroyer Flotilla, based out of Plymouth, and in the early stages of hostilities undertook patrols in the English Channel and South Western Approaches areas. In February 1940, Vanoc accompanied HMS Scarborough escorting a Gibraltar bound convoy, before escorting two Liverpool bound convoys in March. In mid April, she accompanied Chrobry into Namsos in Norway. On 29 April 1940, she deployed with the destroyers HMS Echo, Firedrake, Havelock and Arrow to evacuate troops from Mo and Bodø to Harstad. Later, in June 1940, Vanoc took part in Operation Aerial, the evacuation of British and Allied troops from ports in western France, escorting a convoy of 10 ships from St Nazaire on 18 June.

In early March 1941, Vanoc was assigned to the 5th Escort group and on 15 March the group joined Convoy HX 112 as escort. On the night of 15/16 March, the German submarine U-110, commanded by Fritz-Julius Lemp, sighted the convoy, and made a surface attack, torpedoing the tanker Erdona, which did not sink. The destroyer Scimitar spotted U-110 and summoned Vanoc and Walker. Together, the three destroyers attacked U-110 with depth charges, and Vanoc and Scimitar were assigned to keeping the submarine submerged while the convoy sailed away. Despite this, Lemp evaded the destroyers and re-sighted the convoy later that night, sending location signals that helped to direct more U-boats against the convoy.

At about 10:00 pm on the night of 16/17 March U-99 under the command of Otto Kretschmer infiltrated the convoy and fired U-99's remaining eight torpedoes, hitting six merchant ships and sinking five of them. At 01:30, Walker's sonar detected a submerged submarine, and after an initial attack by Walker and Vanoc, Walker left to rescue survivors from U-99's attack, leaving Vanoc to continue the attack. The depth charges caused serious flooding aboard the German submarine, U-100, under the command of Joachim Schepke, and Schepke, fearing the submarine would sink, and hoping that he could torpedo the British destroyer, ordered U-100 to the surface. Vanoc spotted U-100 on the recently fitted but primitive Type 286M radar, the first confirmed British surface ship radar sighting of a U-boat, and rammed the German submarine, sinking her. Only six of U-100's crew, not including Schepke, survived. Shortly afterwards, U-99, which was trying to slip out of the convoy on the surface, spotted Walker and dived. Walker picked up U-99 on her sonar and attacked with depth charges, forcing the submarine to the surface. Vanoc spotted the surfaced U-99, and both destroyers opened fire on the stricken U-boat, which was scuttled by her crew as they abandoned ship.

From March 1942 she joined the Escort Group B-5 team of destroyers HMS Havelock, Caldwell, Walker, frigate Swale, and corvettes Pimpernel, Godetia, Saxifrage, Buttercup and Lavender. Escort Group B-5 was reassigned to Caribbean trade convoys from March 1942; and returned to the Mid-Ocean Escort Force a year later to escort Convoy SC 122.

On 16 March 1944, in the Straits of Gibraltar at position 35°55′N 05°41′W she co-operated with the frigate HMS Affleck and three 3 US Catalina aircraft (VP 63) to sink the submarine U-392 with a hedgehog attack, resulting in 52 dead (all hands) from U-392. On 21 January 1945, Vanoc collided with, and sank, the naval trawler HMS Computator off Normandy. (49°42′N 00°37′W).

In June 1945, the ship was placed into reserve before being sold for scrap to T.W. Ward the following month. She was broken up sometime after mid-1946 in Falmouth.
