= International Maritime Confederation =

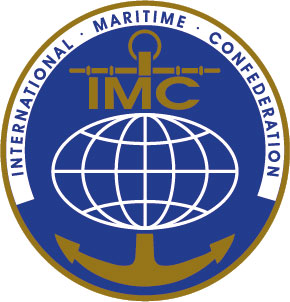
Logo - International Maritime Confederation

The International Maritime Confederation (IMC) is the umbrella organization of maritime organizations and marine societies on the European level. The purpose of the Federation is the joint furthering of maritime understanding and the promotion of maritime ideas on the basis of international cooperation.

== History ==
In 1967, the Deutscher Marinebund (DMB), in cooperation with its French partner association, Fédération des Associations de Marins et de Marins Anciens Combattants (F.A.M.M.A.C.), founded a joint organization. This became the starting point for the IMC, whose statutes were put into force in 1972 within the framework of the DMB delegate meeting. Founding members were maritime associations and societies from Belgium, France, the Netherlands, Austria and Germany. In subsequent years, Great Britain (Royal Naval Association), Italy (Associazone Nationale Marinai d'Italia), and Croatia (Hrvatska Pomorska Straza) joined the Federation. For every nation, only one organization can join the association.

The presidency of the Federation changes every 3 years. Initially, the presidency was occupied by France. In October, 2012, the presidency was assigned to the DMB. Currently, the office is held by the President of the DMB, Karl Heid, located in Laboe in the vicinity of Kiel.

== Activities ==
The stated purpose of the federation is "joint furthering of maritime understanding and the promotion of maritime ideas on the basis of international cooperation." The organization holds annual conferences. The 49th Conference took place in Split, Croatia in October 2024. The 38th meeting took place in the Netherlands in October 2012. Larger numbers of participants are attracted by the international IMC conventions, which so far have been held once every three years. The IMC's annual youth sailing camp enjoys great popularity. The sailing camp 2012 was held from July 9–19 in Ostende, Belgium. The camp in 2013 was organised by the DMB in Germany.

In 2016 the IMC was held in Croatia, where 37 U18's participated. This also included team leaders from 7 different associations.
