= HMS Walker =

Destroyer of the Royal Navy

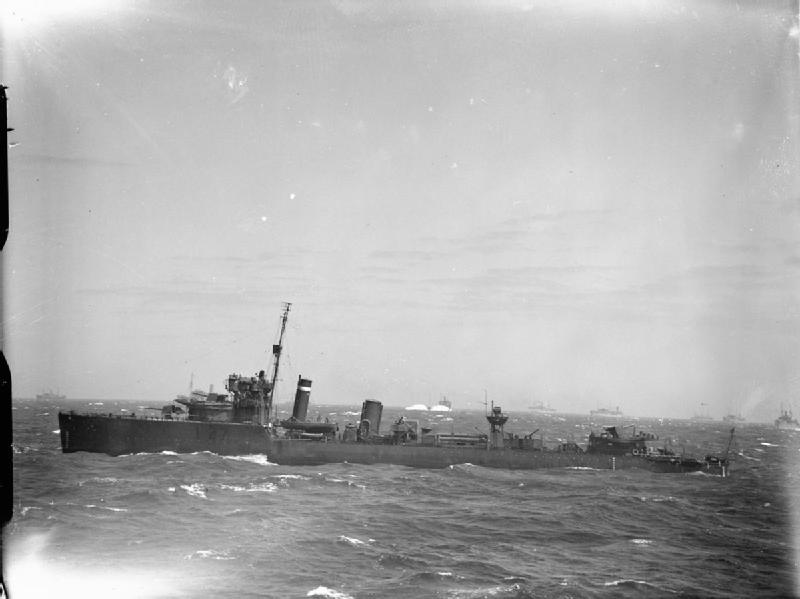
- HMS Walker underway in choppy conditions

History

United Kingdom
- Name: HMS Walker
- Ordered: 9 December 1916
- Builder: William Denny and Brothers, Dumbarton
- Laid down: 26 March 1917
- Launched: 29 November 1917
- Completed: 12 February 1918
- Commissioned: 12 February 1918
- Decommissioned: 1932
- Identification: Pennant number: G22 (January 1918); G08 (April 1918); D27 (interwar); I27 (May 1940)
- Recommissioned: August 1939
- Decommissioned: 1945
- Motto: Ready and faithful
- Honours and awards: Battle honours for: Atlantic 1939-1943; Norway 1940; Normandy 1944; English Channel 1944; Arctic 1944-1945
- Fate: Sold 15 March 1946 for scrapping
- Badge: A stag's head proper issuant from an Eastern Crown on a blue field

General characteristics
- Class & type: Admiralty W-class destroyer
- Displacement: 1,100 tons
- Length: 300 ft (91 m) o/a, 312 ft (95 m) p/p
- Beam: 26 ft 9 in (8.15 m)
- Draught: 9 ft (2.7 m) standard, 11 ft 3 in (3.43 m) in deep
- Propulsion: 3 Yarrow type Water-tube boilers; Brown-Curtis steam turbines; 2 shafts; 27,000 shp (20 MW)
- Speed: 34 knots (63 km/h)
- Range: 320-370 tons oil, 3,500 nmi (6,500 km) at 15 knots (28 km/h), 900 nmi (1,700 km) at 32 knots (59 km/h)
- Complement: 110
- Armament: 4 × QF 4-inch (102 mm) Mk.V guns, mount P Mk.I; 2 × QF 2-pounder Mk.II "pom-pom" (40 mm L/39) or; 1 × QF 3 inch 20 cwt (76 mm), mount HA Mk.II; 6 (2x3) tubes for 21-inch (533 mm) torpedoes

HMS Walker (D27) was a W-class destroyer of the British Royal Navy that saw service in the final months of World War I, in the Russian Civil War and in World War II.

== Construction and commissioning ==
Walker was ordered on 9 December 1916; she was laid down by William Denny and Brothers at Dumbarton, Scotland, on 26 March 1917. She was launched on 29 November, completed on 12 February 1918 – fitted to lay mines and commissioned on the same day. She was assigned the pennant number G22 in January 1918; it was changed to G09 in April 1918, and to D27 during the interwar period.

== Service history ==
=== World War I ===
All of the V- and W-class destroyers, Walker among them, were assigned to the Grand Fleet or Harwich Force for the rest of World War I, which ended with the armistice with Germany on 11 November 1918.

=== Interwar ===
Walker took part in the British campaign against Bolshevik forces in the Baltic Sea during 1919, seeing action against Russian warships; from May 1919 she participated in a blockade of Bolshevik warships in Kronstadt and suffered two hits from the Bolshevik battleship Petropavlovsk during an attempted breakout by the Bolshevik fleet. She was part of the 1st Destroyer Flotilla in the Atlantic Fleet from 1921 to 1930, and visited Helsinki in Finland, from 15 to 22 June 1926 when the flotilla made a cruise in the Baltic. She was decommissioned in 1932, transferred to the Reserve Fleet, and placed in reserve at Rosyth, Scotland.

In August 1939, Walker was recommissioned with a reserve crew to participate in the Royal Review of the Reserve Fleet by King George VI. She remained in commission after the review as the fleet mobilised in the face of rising tensions between the United Kingdom and Nazi Germany; proceeding to Plymouth to prepare for wartime service.

=== World War II ===
==== 1939 ====
When the United Kingdom entered World War II in early September 1939, Walker was assigned to the 11th Destroyer Flotilla at Plymouth for convoy defence and patrol duties in the Southwestern Approaches. On 9 September she and the destroyers Vanquisher and Winchelsea escorted Convoy OB 2. While returning to Plymouth after detaching from the convoy, Walker and Vanquisher collided, killing 14 men about 200 nautical miles (370 km) southwest of Cape Clear Island, Ireland, on 10 or 11 September 1939 (sources differ) with both ships suffering serious damage. Walker's First Lieutenant was compelled to shoot some of the injured who were trapped in the wreckage. She was able to proceed under her own power, but Vanquisher required a tow, so Walker embarked injured personnel from Vanquisher, proceeded to Plymouth and entered Devonport Dockyard for repairs on 14 September 1939. Her repairs were not complete until mid-November, when she rejoined her flotilla, while Vanquisher was not fully repaired until early January 1940.

==== 1940 ====
On 11 January 1940, Walker rescued 32 survivors of the British merchant tanker El Oro, which had sunk 6 nautical miles (11 km; 6.9 mi) west-northwest of Liverpool's Bar Lightship at 53°32′N 003°25′W on 6 January 1940 after striking a mine laid by the German submarine U-30. From 13 to 19 January 1940, Walker joined the destroyer leaders Broke and Keppel and the sloop Enchantress in escorting Convoy HG 15F during the final leg of its voyage from Gibraltar to Liverpool; Broke detached on 15 January and the destroyer Amazon joined the escort to relieve Keppel on 17 January. From 25 to 26 March, Walker, the destroyer leader Campbell, and the destroyers Volunteer and Wanderer escorted convoy Convoy OG 23 in the Southwestern Approaches during the first part of her voyage from the United Kingdom to Gibraltar until relieved by two French Navy warships. After detaching from OG 23, she, Campbell and Volunteer joined the sloops Scarborough and Wellington as the escort for Convoy HG 23 on the final leg of her voyage from Gibraltar to Liverpool, where she arrived on 30 March 1940.

===== Norway =====
On 8 April 1940, Walker was transferred to the Home Fleet at Scapa Flow in the Orkney Islands to support operations during the Norwegian Campaign, escorting British military convoys carrying troops and equipment to the Nordic country. She suffered slight damage during a German air attack on a convoy on 9 April 1940. She came under sustained German air attack on 30 April while evacuating Allied troops from Andalsnes and Molde, where she ferried troops from shore to the light cruiser Sheffield and destroyer Westcott for passage to the United Kingdom. On 1 May 1940, she covered the final evacuation from Andalsnes, also under heavy German air attack.

During May 1940, Walker's pennant number was changed to I27. On 28 May, she and the destroyers Beagle, Fame, and Havelock deployed in Norway's Rombaksfjord to provide gunfire support during an Allied ground operation to capture Narvik. As the Norwegian Campaign ended in an Allied failure to halt the German conquest of that country, Walker became the last Allied ship to leave the Narvik area as she escorted the final Allied evacuation convoy from Norway, departing Harstad on 8 June 1940.

Walker made an unsuccessful counterattack against the German submarine U-47 on 2 July 1940 after the U-boat torpedoed and sank the passenger ship SS Arandora Star while Arandora Star was carrying German and Italian prisoners of war to Canada with 1,676 people on board. The destroyer then returned to the United Kingdom and underwent repairs that lasted until September 1940. In October, she passed her post-repair acceptance trials and returned to convoy escort duties in the Western Approaches.

==== 1941 ====
On 5 February 1941, Walker became part of the 5th Escort Group as the flagship of its senior officer, Donald Macintyre, and continued with escort duties in the Western Approaches. In mid-March, she took part in the highly successful defence of Convoy HX 112. As part of the escort on 16 March, she rescued 38 survivors of the Canadian merchant ship J. B. White, which the German submarine U-99 had torpedoed and sunk at 60°57′00″N 012°27′00″W while attacking the convoy. On 17 March, she and the destroyer Vanoc counterattacked the German submarine U-100 – commanded by one of the Kriegsmarine's top submarine commanders, Kapitänleutnant Joachim Schepke – with depth charges while defending the convoy, forcing U-100 to the surface; Vanoc then rammed and sank U-100 at 03:18 hours at the approximate position 61°00′00″N 012°12′00″W, crushing Schepke to death with her bows while he stood on the submarine's bridge. Thirty-seven other members of U-100's crew also died in the sinking; Walker took aboard her six survivors. While rescuing them, Walker detected U-99 – commanded by another top German submarine officer, Korvettenkapitän Otto Kretschmer – attempting another attack on HX 112, and used depth charges to force her to the surface, after which her crew abandoned ship and scuttled her with the loss of three men dead, at 03:43 or 03:48 hours (sources differ), at the approximate position 61°00′00″N 012°00′00″W. Walker rescued U-99's 40 survivors, among them Kretschmer, who spent the rest of the war as a prisoner-of-war. The loss of these two officers, as well as of another highly successful submarine commander, Korvettenkapitän Günther Prien, killed 10 days earlier in the loss of U-47 while attacking Convoy OB 293, was a major early blow to the German submarine force.

Walker remained on convoy escort duty in the Western Approaches for the remainder of 1941 and into 1942.

==== 1942 ====
From 12 to 15 January 1942, Walker joined Vanoc, Volunteer, and the destroyer Witherington as the local escort of Convoy WS 15, consisting of 22 troopships bound – from the River Clyde in Scotland – for Suez, Egypt; Bombay, India and Singapore; during the first leg of her voyage in the Northwestern Approaches. On 17 February 1942, she joined Convoy WS 16 – 21 troopships headed for Suez and Bombay – in the Clyde to serve along with Witherington, the destroyer Verity, and a large Home Fleet force consisting of the battleship Malaya, the aircraft carriers Eagle and Formidable, the light cruiser Hermione, and the destroyers Active, Anthony, Blankney, Croome, Duncan, Firedrake, Laforey, and Lightning, as escort. On 21 February, the Home Fleet force detached to proceed independently to Gibraltar, but Walker, Verity and Witherington remained with WS 16 until 22 February, when the light cruiser Newcastle and destroyer Paladin relieved them as escort and they detached.

Walker remained on convoy duty in the Western Approaches for the rest of 1942. Near the end of the year, the Royal Navy selected her for conversion into a Long-Range Escort.

==== 1943 ====
Walker was taken into dockyard hands on the River Thames in January 1943 for her conversion. Upon completion, she underwent post-conversion acceptance trials in May and having passed them, spent June in work-ups in preparation for her return to combat service. In July 1943, she was assigned to the 4th Escort Group for convoy defence duties in the Northwestern Approaches and North Atlantic, which she continued until the end of the year.

==== 1944 ====
In January 1944, Walker was transferred to the Home Fleet to escort Arctic convoys to and from the Soviet Union. In February 1944, she was part of the close escort group for Convoy JW 57 during its voyage from the United Kingdom to the Soviet Union along with Keppel, the destroyers Beagle and Boadicea, and four Flower-class corvettes; although the convoy endured German air and submarine attacks during its passage, it suffered no losses among its convoyed ships and arrived at the Kola Inlet on 28 February 1944. On 2 March, the ship joined the same vessels as close escort for the returning Convoy RA 57, which came under attack by German submarines on 4 March and arrived at Loch Ewe, Scotland, on 10 March 1944.

On 29 March 1944, Walker joined Beagle, Boadicea, Keppel, and the sloops of the 2nd Escort Group – Magpie, Starling, Whimbrel, Wild Goose, and Wren, – as close escort for Convoy JW 58 during its voyage to the Soviet Union; it came under German air and submarine attack, but arrived at the Kola Inlet on 4 April. From 7 to 12 April, Walker, Beagle, Boadicea, Keppel and the destroyers Inconstant, Venus, Westcott, Whitehall, and Wrestler escorted Convoy RA 58 during its voyage from the Kola Inlet to Loch Ewe, which the Germans did not detect. On 20 April, Walker joined 15 other Home Fleet destroyers, the escort aircraft carriers Activity and Fencer, the light cruiser Diadem, and three Royal Canadian Navy frigates in escorting the merchant ship Nea Hellas on a voyage to collect ships and personnel from various Soviet Arctic ports, culminating in an arrival at the Kola Inlet. Nea Hellas had to return to the United Kingdom with mechanical problems, but the other ships pushed on, arriving at the Kola Inlet on 23 April 1944. On 13 May, Walker embarked 13 United States Navy enlisted men for transportation to the United Kingdom and departed the Kola Inlet as part of the escort for Convoy RA 59 on its voyage to the United Kingdom. After experiencing very bad weather and two days of German submarine attacks, she detached from RA 59 on 3 May 1944.

Selected for participation in Operation Neptune, the assault phase of the Allied invasion of Normandy which was scheduled for early June 1944, Walker upon her arrival in the United Kingdom, was assigned to Escort Group 137 along with the corvette Honeysuckle and the trawlers Lincolnshire and La Nantaise. The escort group spent the rest of May preparing for Neptune, then proceeded in early June to Milford Haven in Wales, where it joined Convoy E2B2Z – 32 troop transports carrying United States Army troops and equipment to reinforce the beachhead – on 4 June 1944. The convoy arrived at the invasion beaches on 8 June, two days after the initial assault. On 10 June, Walker began escorting convoys to the beachhead during the initial build-up period in Normandy.

Released from supporting the beachhead later in June, Walker returned to escort work in the North Atlantic. She continued this until October, when she was reassigned to the 8th Escort Group for another tour of duty escorting Arctic convoys. On 20 October, she joined the sloops Lapwing and Lark and three Flower-class corvettes as the close escort for Convoy JW 61, which arrived at the Kola Inlet on 28 October without suffering any losses during its passage from the United Kingdom. From 2 to 9 November she joined the same ships in providing the close escort for Convoy RA 61 during its trip from the Kola Inlet to Loch Ewe. The ship then resumed convoy escort work in the Northwestern Approaches, but in December 1944 returned to the Arctic run, joining Keppel, Westcott, and the sloops of the 8th Escort Group on 30 December 1944 as the close escort of Convoy JW 63 during its voyage to the Soviet Union.

==== 1945 ====
Convoy JW 63 arrived at the Kola Inlet on 8 January 1945 after an uneventful passage from the United Kingdom. From 11 to 23 January, Walker, Keppel, and Westcott provided the close escort for Convoy RA 63 during its voyage from the Kola Inlet to the Clyde, a passage made in very bad weather that allowed only slow progress.

Walker returned to Atlantic convoy duty in February 1945. In March, she was assigned to antisubmarine warfare operations and convoy defence in the waters around the British Isles, continuing in this role until the German surrender in early May.

== Decommissioning and disposal ==
Walker did not deploy operationally after Germany's capitulation; the Royal Navy soon decommissioned her and placed her in reserve. She was sold on 15 March 1946 for scrap and was disposed of at Troon in Scotland.

== Bibliography ==
- Campbell, John (1985). Naval Weapons of World War II. Annapolis, Maryland: Naval Institute Press. ISBN 0-87021-459-4.
- Chesneau, Roger, ed. (1980). Conway's All the World's Fighting Ships 1922–1946. Greenwich, UK: Conway Maritime Press. ISBN 0-85177-146-7.
- Colledge, J. J.; Warlow, Ben (2006) [1969]. Ships of the Royal Navy: The Complete Record of All Fighting Ships of the Royal Navy from the 15th Century to the Present (3rd Rev ed.). London: Chatham Publishing. ISBN 978-1-86176-281-8. OCLC 67375475.
- Cocker, Maurice. Destroyers of the Royal Navy, 1893–1981. Ian Allan. ISBN 0-7110-1075-7.
- Friedman, Norman (2009). British Destroyers From Earliest Days to the Second World War. Annapolis, Maryland: Naval Institute Press. ISBN 978-1-59114-081-8.
- Gardiner, Robert & Gray, Randal, eds. (1985). Conway's All the World's Fighting Ships 1906–1921. Annapolis, Maryland: Naval Institute Press. ISBN 0-85177-245-5.
- Lenton, H. T. (1998). British & Empire Warships of the Second World War. Annapolis, Maryland: Naval Institute Press. ISBN 1-55750-048-7.
- March, Edgar J. (1966). British Destroyers: A History of Development, 1892–1953; Drawn by Admiralty Permission From Official Records & Returns, Ships' Covers & Building Plans. London: Seeley Service. OCLC 164893555.
- Preston, Antony (1971). 'V & W' Class Destroyers 1917–1945. London: Macdonald. OCLC 464542895.
- Raven, Alan & Roberts, John (1979). 'V' and 'W' Class Destroyers. Man o'War. Vol. 2. London: Arms & Armour. ISBN 0-85368-233-X.
- Rohwer, Jürgen (2005). Chronology of the War at Sea 1939–1945: The Naval History of World War Two (Third Revised ed.). Annapolis, Maryland: Naval Institute Press. ISBN 1-59114-119-2.
- Whinney, Bob (2000). The U-boat Peril: A Fight for Survival. Cassell. ISBN 0-304-35132-6.
- Whitley, M. J. (1988). Destroyers of World War 2. Annapolis, Maryland: Naval Institute Press. ISBN 0-87021-326-1.
- Winser, John de D. (1999). B.E.F. Ships Before, At and After Dunkirk. Gravesend, Kent: World Ship Society. ISBN 0-905617-91-6.
