= HMS Gentian (K90) =

Flower-class corvette

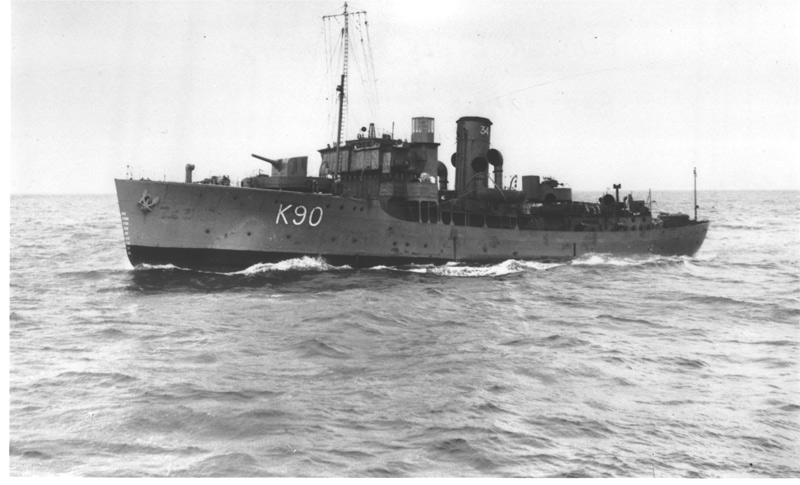
- HMS Gentian – September 1941

History

United Kingdom
- Name: HMS Gentian
- Namesake: gentian
- Ordered: 19 September 1939
- Builder: Harland and Wolff
- Yard number: 1070
- Laid down: 20 April 1940
- Launched: 6 August 1940
- Completed: 22 September 1940
- Commissioned: 20 September 1940
- Identification: Pennant number: K90
- Honours and awards: Atlantic 1939-45; Mediterranean 1940-45; Normandy 1944
- Fate: Scrapped Purfleet 21 August 1947

General characteristics
- Class & type: Flower-class corvette
- Displacement: 950 tons
- Length: 205 ft (62 m)
- Installed power: 2,750 hp (2,050 kW)
- Propulsion: Reciprocating engine, 1 shaft
- Speed: 16 knots (30 km/h; 18 mph)
- Range: 3,500 nmi (6,500 km; 4,000 mi) at 12 knots (22 km/h; 14 mph)
- Complement: 85
- Armament: 1 × BL 4 in (102 mm) Mk IX gun; 1 × QF 2-pounder AA gun; 4 × .303 in AA machine guns

HMS Gentian was a Royal Navy Flower-class corvette that served in the Battle of the Atlantic during World War II.

One of the first batch of wartime corvettes laid down, she served most of the time in the Western Approaches, escorting convoys across the North Atlantic with Escort Group B2 and was also on the Arctic runs to Murmansk and Archangel. In 1941 the ship was also involved in escort work out of Gibraltar and was one of the Royal Navy corvettes employed on escort duties during D-Day.

== Kington ==
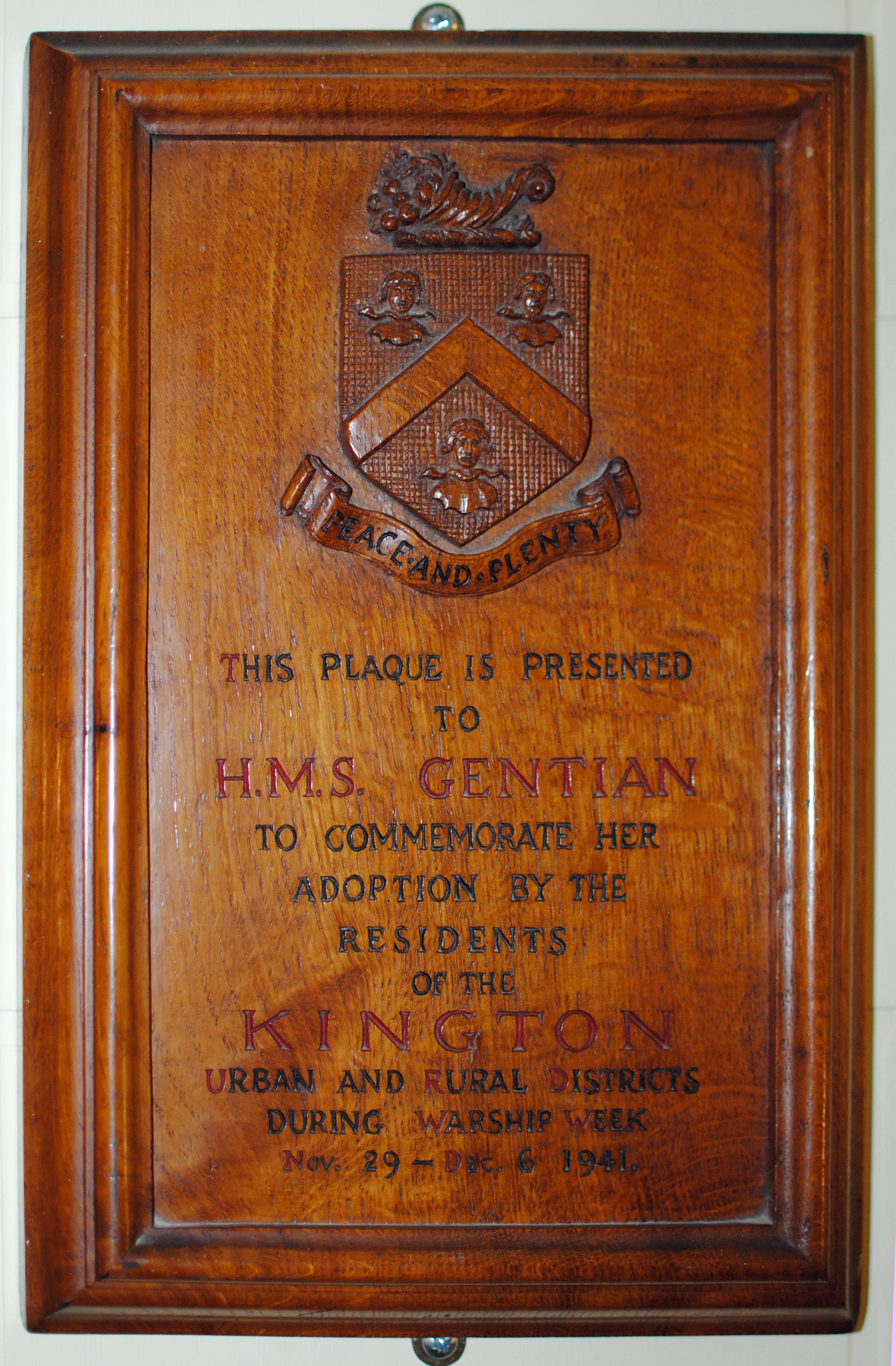
Adoption plaque

The ship was adopted by the residents of the Kington Urban and Rural Districts, during Warship Week, 29 November – 6 December 1941. The plaque presented to the ship is now in Kington Museum.

== Wartime service ==
Western Approaches Command convoy's involving HMS Gentian

- HX 82 (Departed Halifax, 20 October 1940, arrived Liverpool, 6 November 1940 – ESCORT 01/11 – 04/11)
- SC 9 (Departed Sydney CB, 24 October 1940, arrived Liverpool, 9 November 1940 – ESCORT 04/11 – 09/11)
- OB 236 (Departed Liverpool, 29 October 1940, dispersed 2 December 1940 – ESCORT 01/11 – 01/11)
- HX 90 (Departed Halifax, 21 November 1940, rendezvous with Gentian 2 December 1940, arrived Liverpool, 5 December 1940)
- OB 251 (Departed Liverpool, 28 November 1940, dispersed 17.20W 1 December 1940 – ESCORT 28/11 – 01/12)
- SL-57 (Departed Freetown, 28 November 1940, arrived Liverpool, 19 December 1940 – ESCORT 15/12 – 17/12)
- OB 258 (Departed Liverpool, 12 December 1940, dispersed 15 December 1940 – ESCORT 12/12 – 15/12)
- OB 265 (Departed Liverpool, 26 December 1940, dispersed 30 December 1940 – ESCORT 26/12 – 30/12)
- HX 97 (Departed Halifax, 18 November 1940, arrived Liverpool, 3 January 1941 – ESCORT 30/12 – 03/01)
- OB 271 (Departed Liverpool, 8 January 1941, dispersed 12 January 1941 – ESCORT 8/1 – 12/1)
- HX 100 (Departed Halifax, 1 January 1941, arrived Liverpool, 18 January 1941 – ESCORT 13/01 – 17/01)
- HX 103 (Departed Halifax, 15 January 1941, arrived Liverpool, 1 February 1941 – ESCORT 27/01-)
- OB 277 (Departed Liverpool, 22 January 1941, dispersed 27 January 1941 – ESCORT 22/01 – 26/01)
- OG-52 (Departed Liverpool, 5 February 1941, arrived Gibraltar 21 February 1941 – ESCORT 05/02 – 21/02)
- HG-55 (Departed Gibraltar, 3 March 1941, arrived Liverpool 22 March 1941 – ESCORT 03/03 – 10/03)
- HG-57 (Departed Gibraltar, 25 March 1941, arrived Liverpool, 11 April 1941 – ESCORT 24/03)
- HG-59 (Departed Gibraltar, 15 April 1941, arrived Liverpool, 1 May 1941 – ESCORT 15/04 – 22/04)
- HG-61 (Departed Gibraltar, 6 May 1941, arrived Liverpool, 20 May 1941)
- SL-74 (Departed Freetown, 10 May 1941, arrived Liverpool, 4 June 1941 – ESCORT 30/05 – 04/06)
- OB 321 (Departed Liverpool, 11 May 1941, dispersed 17 May 1941 – ESCORT 12/05 – 17/05)
- OB 333 (Departed Liverpool, 10 June 1941, dispersed 40.20N 34.40W 21 June 1941 – ESCORT 10/06 – 21/06)
- HG-69 (Departed Gibraltar, 28 July 1941, arrived Liverpool, 11 August 1941- ESCORT 08/08 – 11/08 )
- OS-2 (Depart Liverpool, 3 August 1941, arrived Freetown, 22 August 1941 – ESCORT 04/08 – 08/08)
- OG-73 (Departed Liverpool, 29 August 1941, arrived Gibraltar 13 September 1941 – ESCORT 29/08 – 11/09)
- HG-73 (Departed Gibraltar, 17 September 1941, arrived Liverpool, 1 October 1941 – ESCORT 17/09 – 30/09)
- ON 27 (Departed Liverpool, 16 October 1941, dispersed 2 November 1941 – ESCORT 17/10 – 24/10)
- HX 155 (Departed Halifax, 16 October 1941, arrived Liverpool, 31 October 1941 – ESCORT 25/10 – 31/10)
- ON 34 (Departed Liverpool, 7 November 1941, dispersed 46.18N 52.40W 21 November 1941 – ESCORT 07/11 – 12/11)
- ON 41 (Departed Liverpool, 27 November 1941, dispersed 47.44N 45.16W 11 December 1941 – ESCORT 27/11 – 06/12)
- HX 162 (Departed Halifax, 27 November 1941, arrived Liverpool, 11 December 1941 – ESCORT 07/12 – 10/12)
- ON 48 (Departed Liverpool, 19 December 1941, dispersed 43.59N 54.56W 31 December 1941 – ESCORT 19/12 – 26/12)
- HX 166 (Departed Halifax, 21 December 1941, arrived Liverpool, 5 January 1942 – ESCORT 30/12 – 04/01)
- ON 56 (Departed Liverpool, 12 January 1942, dispersed 59.00N 17.00W 16 January 1942- ESCORT 12/01 – 16/01)
- SC 65 (Departed Halifax, 17 January 1942, arrived Liverpool, 4 February 1942 – ESCORT 29/01 – 31/01)
- SC 67 (Departed Halifax, 30 January 1942, arrived Liverpool, 15 February 1942 – ESCORT 11/02 – 14/02)
- ON 69 (Departed Liverpool, 20 February 1942, dispersed off Cape Cod 6 March 1942 – ESCORT 24/02 – 04/03)
- HX 180 (Departed Halifax, 15 March 1942, arrived Liverpool, 27 March 1942 – ESCORT 19/03 – 27/03)
- ON 83 (Departed Liverpool, 4 April 1942, arrived Halifax 17 April 1942 – ESCORT 05/04 – 15/04)
- SC 81 (Departed Halifax, 23 April 1942, arrived Liverpool, 9 May 1942 – ESCORT 27/04 – 09/05)
- HX 203 (Departed Halifax, 16 August 1942, arrived Liverpool, 28 August 1942)
- ON 128 (Departed Liverpool, 5 September 1942, arrived New York City, 24 September 1942 – Gentian relieved on 18 September 1942)
- HX 208 (Departed New York City, 17 September 1942, arrived Liverpool, 2 October 1942 – Gentian joined convoy on 23 September 1942)
- ON 138 (Departed Liverpool, 11 October 1942, arrived New York City, 3 November 1942 – ESCORT 13/10 – 28/10)
- HX 213 (Departed New York City, 26 October 1942, arrived Liverpool, 10 November 1942)
- ON 148 (Departed Liverpool, 23 November 1942, arrived New York City, 13 December 1942 – ESCORT 24/11 – 04/12)
- HX 219 (Departed New York City, 13 December 1942, arrived Liverpool, 29 December 1942)
- ON 159 (Departed Liverpool, 4 January 1943, arrived New York, 20 January 1943)
- ON 161 (Departed Liverpool, 12 January 1943, arrived New York, 31 January 1943 – Gentian joined convoy on 24 January 1943)
- SC 117 (Departed New York City, 12 January 1943, arrived Liverpool, 3 February 1943 – ESCORT 29/01 – 02/02)
- ON 170 (Departed Liverpool, 3 March 1943, arrived New York, 20 March 1943)
- SC 123 (Departed New York City, 14 March 1943, arrived Liverpool, 3 April 1943 – ESCORT 21/03 – 01/04)
- ONS 4 (Departed Liverpool, 13 April 1943, arrived Halifax, 5 May 1943 – ESCORT 14/04 – 29/04)
- SC 129 (Departed Halifax, 2 May 1943, Gentian joined convoy with Escort Group B2 on 6 May)
- ONS 9 (Departed Liverpool, 28 May 1943, arrived Halifax, 9 June 1943 – ESCORT 01/06 – 07/06)
- SC 134 (Departed Halifax, 16 June 1943, arrived Liverpool, 1 July 1943 – ESCORT 20/06 – 29/06)
- ONS 13 (Departed Liverpool, 14 July 1943, arrived Halifax, 29 July 1943 – ESCORT 15/07 – 25/07)
- SC 138 (Departed Halifax, 30 July 1943, arrived Liverpool, 12 August 1943 – ESCORT 03/08 – 12/08)
- ONS 22 (Departed Liverpool, 4 November 1943, arrived Halifax, 22 November 1943 – ESCORT 05/11 – 17/11)
- HX 267 (Departed New York City, 19 November 1943, arrived Liverpool, 3 December 1943 – ESCORT 25/11 – 02/12)
- ONS 25 (Departed Liverpool, 15 December 1943, arrived Halifax, 3 January 1944 – ESCORT 17/12 – 30/12)
- HX 273 (Departed New York City, 29 December 1943, arrived Liverpool, 14 January 1944 – ESCORT 03/01 – 14/01)
- ON 221 (Departed Liverpool, 24 January 1944, arrived NYC, 11 February 1944 – ESCORT 25/01 – 06/02)
- HX 278 (Departed New York City, 5 February 1944, arrived Liverpool, 20 February 1944 – ESCORT 10/02 – 20/02)
- ON 226 (Departed Liverpool, 29 February 1944, arrived NYC, 15 March 1944 – ESCORT 01/03 – 10/03)
- SC 155 (Departed Halifax, 14 March 1944, arrived Liverpool, 29 March 1944 – ESCORT 17/03 – 28/03)
- WP.SP-30 (Depart Milford Haven, 27 April 1944, arrived Portsmouth, 29 April 1944 – ESCORT 27/04 – 29/04)
- WP-528 (Depart Milford Haven, 26 May 1944, arrived Portsmouth, 28 May 1944 – ESCORT 26/05 – 27/05)
- EBM-1 (Depart Clyde, 1 June 1944, arrived Seine Bay, 1 June 1944 – ESCORT 01/06)
- FTC-1 (Departed Seine Bay, 8 June 1944, arrived Southend 10 June 1944 – ESCORT 08/06 – 10/06)
- FTC-6 (Departed Seine Bay, 13 June 1944, arrived Southend 14 June 1944 – ESCORT 13/06 – 14/06)
- FTM-29 (Departed Seine Bay, 6 July 1944, arrived Southend 7 July 1944 – ESCORT 06/07 – 06/07)
- MKS-74G (Departed Gibraltar, 31 December 1944, arrived Liverpool, 10 January 1945 – ESCORT 08/01 – 10/01)
- BTC-82 (Departed Milford Haven 27 February 1945, arrived Southend 2 March 1945 – ESCORT 27/02 – 02/03)
