= HMS Heather (K69) =

British Flower-class corvette

History

United Kingdom
- Name: HMS Heather
- Builder: Harland & Wolff
- Yard number: 1073
- Laid down: 22 May 1940
- Launched: 17 September 1940
- Completed: 1 November 1940
- Commissioned: 1 November 1940
- Identification: Pennant number: K69
- Fate: Sold for scrap 22 May 1947

General characteristics
- Class & type: Flower-class corvette
- Displacement: 940 tons

HMS Heather was a Flower-class corvette of the Royal Navy.
