= German submarine U-100 (1940) =

German World War II submarine

Coordinates: 61°04′N 11°30′W

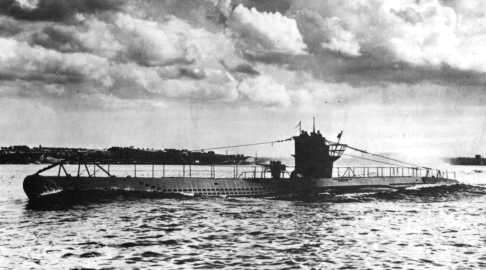
- U-100

History

Nazi Germany
- Name: U-100
- Ordered: 15 December 1937
- Builder: Germaniawerft, Kiel
- Yard number: 594
- Laid down: 22 May 1939
- Launched: 10 April 1940
- Commissioned: 30 May 1940
- Fate: Sunk 17 March 1941

General characteristics
- Class & type: Type VIIB submarine
- Displacement: 753 tonnes (741 long tons) surfaced; 857 t (843 long tons) submerged
- Length: 66.50 m (218 ft 2 in) o/a; 48.80 m (160 ft 1 in) pressure hull
- Beam: 6.20 m (20 ft 4 in) o/a; 4.70 m (15 ft 5 in) pressure hull
- Height: 9.50 m (31 ft 2 in)
- Draught: 4.74 m (15 ft 7 in)
- Installed power: 2,800–3,200 PS (2,100–2,400 kW; 2,800–3,200 bhp) (diesels); 750 PS (550 kW; 740 shp) (electric)
- Propulsion: 2 shafts; 2 × diesel engines; 2 × electric motors
- Speed: 17.9 kn (33.2 km/h; 20.6 mph) surfaced; 8 knots (15 km/h; 9.2 mph) submerged
- Range: 8,700 nmi (16,100 km; 10,000 mi) at 10 knots (19 km/h; 12 mph) surfaced; 90 nmi (170 km; 100 mi) at 4 knots (7.4 km/h; 4.6 mph) submerged
- Test depth: 220 m (720 ft); Crush depth: 230–250 m (750–820 ft)
- Complement: 4 officers, 40–56 enlisted
- Sensors & processing systems: Gruppenhorchgerät
- Armament: 5 × 53.3 cm (21 in) torpedo tubes (four bow, one stern); 14 torpedoes or 26 TMA mines; 1 × 8.8 cm (3.5 in) deck gun with 220 rounds; 1 × 2 cm (0.79 in) C/30 anti-aircraft gun

Service record
- Part of: 7th U-boat Flotilla; 30 May 1940 – 17 March 1941
- Identification codes: M 01 800
- Commanders: Kptlt. Joachim Schepke; 30 May 1940 – 17 March 1941
- Operations: 6 patrols: 1st patrol: 9 August – 1 September 1940; 2nd patrol: 11 – 25 September 1940; 3rd patrol: 12 – 23 October 1940; 4th patrol: 7 – 27 November 1940; 5th patrol: 2 December 1940 – 1 January 1941; 6th patrol: 9 – 17 March 1941
- Victories: 25 merchant ships sunk (135,614 GRT); 1 merchant ship total loss (2,205 GRT); 4 merchant ships damaged (17,229 GRT)

German submarine U-100 was a Type VIIB U-boat of Nazi Germany's Kriegsmarine during World War II.

== Design ==
German Type VIIB submarines were preceded by the shorter Type VIIA submarines. U-100 had a displacement of 753 tonnes (741 long tons) when at the surface and 857 tonnes (843 long tons) while submerged. She had a total length of 66.50 m (218 ft 2 in), a pressure hull length of 48.80 m (160 ft 1 in), a beam of 6.20 m (20 ft 4 in), a height of 9.50 m (31 ft 2 in), and a draught of 4.74 m (15 ft 7 in). The submarine was powered by two Germaniawerft F46 four-stroke, six-cylinder supercharged diesel engines producing a total of 2,800 to 3,200 metric horsepower (2,060 to 2,350 kW; 2,760 to 3,160 shp) for use while surfaced, two BBC GG UB 720/8 double-acting electric motors producing a total of 750 metric horsepower (550 kW; 740 shp) for use while submerged. She had two shafts and two 1.23 m (4 ft) propellers. The boat was capable of operating at depths of up to 230 metres (750 ft).

The submarine had a maximum surface speed of 17.9 knots (33.2 km/h; 20.6 mph) and a maximum submerged speed of 8 knots (15 km/h; 9.2 mph). When submerged, the boat could operate for 90 nautical miles (170 km; 100 mi) at 4 knots (7.4 km/h; 4.6 mph); when surfaced, she could travel 8,700 nautical miles (16,100 km; 10,000 mi) at 10 knots (19 km/h; 12 mph). U-100 was fitted with five 53.3 cm (21 in) torpedo tubes (four fitted at the bow and one at the stern), fourteen torpedoes, one 8.8 cm (3.46 in) SK C/35 naval gun, 220 rounds, and one 2 cm (0.79 in) anti-aircraft gun. The boat had a complement of between 44 and 60.

== Service history ==
=== First patrol ===
The boat was launched on 10 April 1940, with a crew of 53, under the command of Kapitänleutnant Joachim Schepke. On her first active patrol, U-100 came into contact with two Allied convoys, OA-198 and OA-204. She shadowed both convoys.

=== Second patrol ===
U-100 departed for her second active patrol on 11 September 1940, coming into contact with the Allied convoy HX 72. HX 72 lost 11 ships in total, with U-100 accounting for 7 ships of 50,340 GRT. In the attack on this convoy, while other U-boats stood off to the side and fired their torpedoes to little or no success, U-100 penetrated inside the convoy before attacking, a tactic soon adopted by the C-in-C of U-boats, Admiral Karl Donitz.

=== Third patrol ===
After resupplying, U-100 departed for her third active patrol on 12 October 1940. She came into contact with two Allied convoys, HX 79 and SC 7.

=== Fourth patrol ===
U-100 departed on her fourth patrol on 7 November 1940. On 22 November she came into contact with the Allied convoy SC 11 and began to shadow it.

=== Fifth patrol ===
U-100 left for her fifth active patrol on 2 December 1940, sinking two vessels from Convoy OB 256, then a third solo vessel.

=== Sixth and final patrol ===
U-100 departed on her sixth and what would be her final patrol on 9 March 1941. She approached convoy HX 112 from astern in the pre-dawn hours of 17 March, but was detected at a range of 1,000 meters by the Type 286 radar aboard HMS Vanoc. U-100 was the first U-boat to be so discovered during World War II; she was rammed and sunk by Vanoc while attempting to submerge. Another destroyer, HMS Walker, was also present. Six of the boat's 53 crew members survived, spending the remainder of the war as POWs. Schepke was not one of them.

== Summary of raiding history ==
| Date | Ship | Flag | Tonnage (GRT) | Fate |
|---|---|---|---|---|
| 16 August 1940 | Empire Merchant | United Kingdom | 4,864 | Sunk |
| 25 August 1940 | Jamaica Pioneer | United Kingdom | 5,471 | Sunk |
| 29 August 1940 | Dalblair | United Kingdom | 4,608 | Sunk |
| 29 August 1940 | Hartismere | United Kingdom | 5,498 | Damaged |
| 29 August 1940 | Astra II | United Kingdom | 2,393 | Sunk |
| 29 August 1940 | Alida Gorthon | Sweden | 2,373 | Sunk |
| 29 August 1940 | Empire Moose | United Kingdom | 6,103 | Sunk |
| 21 September 1940 | Canonesa | United Kingdom | 8,286 | Sunk |
| 21 September 1940 | Torinia | United Kingdom | 10,364 | Sunk |
| 21 September 1940 | Dalcairn | United Kingdom | 4,608 | Sunk |
| 22 September 1940 | Empire Airman | United Kingdom | 6,586 | Sunk |
| 22 September 1940 | Scholar | United Kingdom | 3,940 | Sunk |
| 22 September 1940 | Frederick S. Fales | United Kingdom | 10,525 | Sunk |
| 22 September 1940 | Simla | Norway | 6,031 | Sunk |
| 18 October 1940 | Shekatika | United Kingdom | 5,458 | Damaged |
| 18 October 1940 | Boekelo | Netherlands | 2,118 | Damaged |
| 19 October 1940 | Blairspey | United Kingdom | 4,155 | Damaged |
| 20 October 1940 | Caprella | United Kingdom | 8,230 | Sunk |
| 20 October 1940 | Sitala | United Kingdom | 6,218 | Sunk |
| 20 October 1940 | Loch Lomond | United Kingdom | 5,452 | Sunk |
| 23 November 1940 | Justitia | United Kingdom | 4,562 | Sunk |
| 23 November 1940 | Bradfyne | United Kingdom | 4,740 | Sunk |
| 23 November 1940 | Ootmarsum | Netherlands | 3,628 | Sunk |
| 23 November 1940 | Bruse | Norway | 2,205 | Total Loss |
| 23 November 1940 | Salonica | Norway | 2,694 | Sunk |
| 23 November 1940 | Leise Maersk | United Kingdom | 3,136 | Sunk |
| 23 November 1940 | Bussum | Netherlands | 3,636 | Sunk |
| 14 December 1940 | Kyleglen | United Kingdom | 3,670 | Sunk |
| 14 December 1940 | Euphorbia | United Kingdom | 3,380 | Sunk |
| 18 December 1940 | Napier Star | United Kingdom | 10,116 | Sunk |
| Sunk: | | | 135,614 | |
| Total loss: | | | 2,205 | |
| Damaged: | | | 17,229 | |
| Total: | | | 155,048 | |

== Bibliography ==
- Busch, Rainer; Röll, Hans-Joachim (1999). German U-boat commanders of World War II : a biographical dictionary. Translated by Brooks, Geoffrey. London, Annapolis, Md: Greenhill Books, Naval Institute Press. ISBN 1-55750-186-6.
- Busch, Rainer; Röll, Hans-Joachim (1999). Deutsche U-Boot-Verluste von September 1939 bis Mai 1945 [German U-boat losses from September 1939 to May 1945]. Der U-Boot-Krieg (in German). Vol. IV. Hamburg, Berlin, Bonn: Mittler. ISBN 3-8132-0514-2.
- Gröner, Erich; Jung, Dieter; Maass, Martin (1991). German Warships 1815–1945, U-boats and Mine Warfare Vessels. Vol. 2. Translated by Thomas, Keith; Magowan, Rachel. London: Conway Maritime Press. ISBN 0-85177-593-4.
- Rohwer, J.; Hummelchen, G. (1992). Chronology of the War at Sea 1939–1945. Naval Institute Press. ISBN 1-55750-105-X.
- Kemp, Paul (1997). U-Boats Destroyed – German Submarine Losses in the World Wars. Arms and Armour Press. p. 69. ISBN 1-85409-321-5.
