= Joachim Schepke =

German World War II U-boat commander

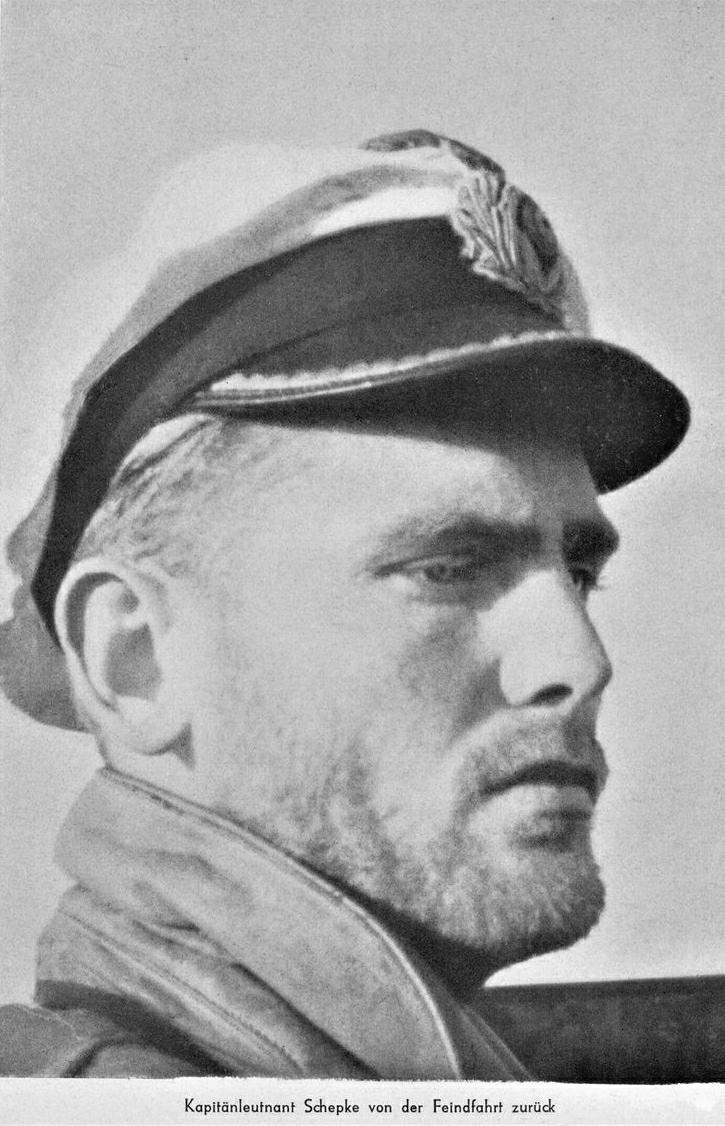
- Born: 8 March 1912; Flensburg, Province of Schleswig-Holstein, Prussia, Germany
- Died: 17 March 1941 (aged 29) U-100, Western Approaches, off British-occupied Iceland; 61°N 12°W
- Allegiance: Weimar Republic (to 1933); Nazi Germany
- Branch: Reichsmarine; Kriegsmarine
- Service years: 1930–41
- Rank: Kapitänleutnant
- Commands: U-3; U-19; U-100
- Conflicts: World War II
- Awards: Knight's Cross of the Iron Cross with Oak Leaves

Joachim Schepke (8 March 1912 – 17 March 1941) was a German U-boat commander during World War II. He was the seventh recipient of the Knight's Cross of the Iron Cross with Oak Leaves.

Schepke is credited with having sunk 36 Allied ships. During his career, he gained notoriety among fellow U-boat commanders for exaggerating the tonnage of ships sunk.

== Career ==
Schepke joined the Reichsmarine in 1930. In 1934, he was assigned to the newly created U-boat arm, and in 1938 he commanded U-3. After a short stint commanding U-19 and serving in a staff position, Schepke received the command of U-100, a Type VIIB boat. After 5 patrols in U-100 she was heavily damaged on 17 March 1941 by depth charges from HMS Walker and Vanoc while attacking Convoy HX 112. U-100 was forced to surface and was detected on radar and rammed by Vanoc. Schepke and most of the crew died.

Schepke claimed to have sunk 37 ships, for a total of 213,310 gross register tons (GRT) and damaged four more. If true, this would have made him the third skipper to have sunk over 200,000 tons. While he definitely sank 36 ships, he was known throughout the fleet to exaggerate his tonnage claims; other U-boat men came to use the expression "Schepke tonnage" in reference to this. Nonetheless, at one point Schepke ranked first in the number of ships sunk, and was recommended by Admiral Dönitz for the Knight's Cross with Oak Leaves.

== Awards ==
- Iron Cross (1939)
  - 2nd Class
  - 1st Class (27 February 1940)
- U-Boat War Badge (1939) (3 January 1940 – 30 April 1940)
- Knight's Cross of the Iron Cross with Oak Leaves
  - Knight's Cross on 24 September 1940 as Kapitänleutnant and commander of U-100
  - 7th Oak Leaves on 1 December 1940 as Kapitänleutnant and commander of U-100
