= List of shipwrecks in October 1940 =

The list of shipwrecks in October 1940 includes ships sunk, foundered, grounded, or otherwise lost during October 1940.

== 1 October ==
For the loss of SS Haulerwijk on the day, see the entry for 30 September 1940

List of shipwrecks: 1 October 1940
Ship	State	Description
Aghios Nicolaos	Greece	World War II: The cargo ship (3,687 GRT) was shelled and sunk in the Atlantic Ocean 300 nautical miles (560 km) off Lisbon, Portugal (40°00′N 16°55′W) by Maggiore Baracca (Regia Marina). Her 26 crew were allowed to leave the ship and survived.
Gondul	Sweden	World War II: The cargo ship (1,259 GRT) struck a mine and sank in shallow water in the Baltic Sea off Klagshamn, Sweden. The whole crew survived, five of them wounded. She was raised two weeks later, repaired and resumed service.
Highland Patriot	United Kingdom	World War II: The cargo liner (14,172 GRT) was torpedoed and sunk in the Atlantic Ocean west of Ireland (52°20′N 19°04′W) by U-38 (Kriegsmarine) with the loss of three of the 172 people aboard. Survivors were rescued by HMS Wellington (Royal Navy). Highland Patriot was on a voyage from Buenos Aires, Argentina to the Clyde.

== 2 October ==
List of shipwrecks: 2 October 1940
Ship	State	Description
Berillo	Regia Marina	World War II: The Perla-class submarine (695 GRT) was attacked in the Mediterranean Sea off Sidi Barrani, Egypt (33°09′N 26°24′E) by HMS Hasty and HMS Havock (both Royal Navy) and was scuttled by her crew. Two of her 47 crew were killed, the survivors were captured.
Kayeson	United Kingdom	World War II: The cargo ship (4,606 GRT) was torpedoed and sunk in the Atlantic Ocean west of Ireland (51°12′N 24°22′W) by U-32 (Kriegsmarine). The crew was seen to leave the ship and board the lifeboats, but were not seen again. All 38 crew members died.
Latymer	United Kingdom	World War II: Convoy HG 44: The cargo ship (2,096 GRT) was bombed and sunk in the Atlantic Ocean 4 nautical miles (7.4 km) west of the Skellig Islands, County Kerry, Ireland (51°20′N 10°30′W) by Focke-Wulf Fw 200 aircraft of I./Kampfgeschwader 40, Luftwaffe. Six of her crew were killed. The twenty-two survivors were picked up by the British trawler Kilgerran Castle.

== 3 October ==
List of shipwrecks: 3 October 1940
Ship	State	Description
Actuosity	United Kingdom	The coaster (359 GRT) on a trip from Tyne for London with a cargo of wheat, foundered in the North Sea off Cromer, Norfolk after striking a sunken wreck (52°57′30″N 1°29′30″E). Her eight crew were rescued.
HMS Lady of the Isles	Royal Navy	World War II: The cable layer (166 GRT) struck a mine 3 nautical miles (5.6 km) east of St. Anthony Point, Cornwall (50°10′N 4°24′W) and sank with the loss of sixteen of her crew. There were three survivors. She was under tow of the tug Lauwerzee that sank at the same time.
Lauwerzee	Netherlands	World War II: The tug (262 GRT) struck a mine 3 nautical miles (5.6 km) east of St. Anthony Point (50°10′N 4°24′W) and sank with the loss of twelve of her crew, leaving only one survivor. She was towing the cable layer Lady of the Isles that sank at the same time.

== 4 October ==
List of shipwrecks: 4 October 1940
Ship	State	Description
Franca Fassio	Italy	World War II: The passenger ship (1,858 GRT) on a trip from Genoa for Barcelona was torpedoed and sunk in the Gulf of Genoa 16 nautical miles (30 km) east of Capo Noli (44°10′N 9°25′E) by HMS Triton (Royal Navy). There were 64 dead and nine survivors.
Hugin	Sweden	World War II: The fishing trawler (42 GRT) struck a mine and sank in the Skaggerak off Hanstholm, Denmark, with the loss of her five crew.
J & M Garratt	United Kingdom	The schooner (104 GRT) burned off Drogheda, Ireland, after an engine fire and sank. The whole crew abandoned the ship safely.
Nina Bianchi	Italy	The cargo ship (2,251 GRT) collided with Veloce (Italy) in the Adriatic Sea off San Cataldo di Lecce (40°27′N 18°24′E) and sank. There were 21 dead and five survivors.
HMS Rainbow	Royal Navy	World War II: The Rainbow-class submarine (1,800 GRT) was sunk in a collision with Antonietta Costa (Italy) in the Adriatic Sea off Bari, Italy (41°28′N 18°05′E). All 56 crew were lost.
Sirdar	United Kingdom	World War II: The tug (34 GRT) was sunk in The Swale, Kent, either by Luftwaffe aircraft or by a mine, with the loss of all three crew.

== 5 October ==
List of shipwrecks: 5 October 1940
Ship	State	Description
Adaptity	United Kingdom	World War II: The coaster (372 GRT) struck a mine and sank in the Thames Estuary (51°44′N 1°17′E) with the loss of four crew members.
Bruce Cann	Canada	The coaster (48 GRT) was stranded on a sand bar off Partridge Island, Saint John, New Brunswick, at low tide. The crew walked ashore but the ship rolled on her side on the flood tide and broke up the next day.
HMT Kingston Sapphire	Royal Navy	World War II: The naval trawler (352 GRT) was torpedoed and sunk in the Atlantic Ocean 20 nautical miles (37 km) south of Cádiz, Spain (36°11′N 6°32′W) by Nani (Regia Marina) with the loss of three of her crew. The 38 or 39 survivors were rescued by a Spanish fishing trawler.
Maria Grazia	Italy	World War II: The coaster (188 GRT), an auxiliary barquentine, was rammed and sunk in the Mediterranean Sea (41°05′N 17°45′E) by HMS Regent (Royal Navy). There were no casualties
Ottoland	Netherlands	World War II: The collier (2,202 GRT) struck a mine and sank in the North Sea off Sunderland, County Durham, United Kingdom. Her crew were rescued.

== 6 October ==
List of shipwrecks: 6 October 1940
Ship	State	Description
Benlawers	United Kingdom	World War II: Convoy OB 221: The cargo ship (5,943 GRT) straggled behind the convoy. She was torpedoed and sunk in the Atlantic Ocean west of Ireland (53°20′N 26°10′W) by U-123 (Kriegsmarine) with the loss of 24 of her 51 crew. Survivors were rescued by Bengore Head and Forest (both United Kingdom).
Jersey Queen	United Kingdom	World War II: The coaster (910 GRT) struck a mine and sank in the English Channel off Falmouth, Cornwall with the loss of two of her crew. There were ten survivors.
Nina Borthen	Norway	World War II: The tanker (6,123 GRT) was torpedoed and sunk in the Atlantic Ocean west of Ireland (54°00′N 26°00′W) by U-103 (Kriegsmarine) with the loss of all crew (listed as 35 men but only 32 are known).
HMD Scotch Thistle	Royal Navy	The drifter (84 GRT) ran aground during the night near Frinton-on-Sea, England. Her eleven crew were all rescued. She was later reported to have sunk.
Vido	Yugoslavia	World War II: The cargo ship (1,919 GRT) struck a mine in the Black Sea 9.7 nautical miles (18.0 km) east of Sulina, Romania and was beached. Her crew survived.

== 7 October ==
List of shipwrecks: 7 October 1940
Ship	State	Description
British General	United Kingdom	World War II: The tanker (6,989 GRT) was torpedoed and damaged in the evening of 6 October in the Atlantic Ocean west of Ireland (51°42′N 24°03′W) by U-37 (Kriegsmarine). She remained afloat with her crew aboard until U-37 hit her again with two torpedoes the next day. She sank with the loss of all 47 crew.
Marie	Denmark	The cutter foundered in bad weather in the Kattegat off Hurup Thy, Denmark with the loss of one of her two crew.
Touraine	Norway	World War II: Convoy OB 224: The cargo ship (5,811 GRT) was torpedoed and sunk in the Atlantic Ocean (55°12′N 10°18′W) by U-59 (Kriegsmarine). All 35 crew survived; some were rescued by HMS Derbyshire (Royal Navy), others reached land in their lifeboats in Ireland where one of them died in hospital from injuries and/or exposure.

== 8 October ==
List of shipwrecks: 8 October 1940
Ship	State	Description
Bellona II	United Kingdom	World War II: The coaster (839 GRT) was bombed and damaged in the North Sea 4 nautical miles (7.4 km) off Gourdon, Aberdeenshire by Luftwaffe aircraft. She drifted ashore at Streathlethan Bay, Aberdeenshire and was declared a constructive total loss. Of the 27 people aboard six crew and three cargo workers were killed.
Confield	United Kingdom	World War II: Convoy HX 76: The cargo ship (4,956 GRT) straggled behind the convoy due to her cargo shifting. She was torpedoed and damaged in the Atlantic Ocean west of the Outer Hebrides (56°48′N 10°17′W) by U-58 (Kriegsmarine) with the loss of one of her 37 crew. Survivors were rescued by HMS Periwinkle and HMS Weston (both Royal Navy), the latter of which scuttled Confield.
Gemma	Regia Marina	World War II: The Perla-class submarine (695 GRT) was torpedoed by error and sank in the Mediterranean Sea east of Karpathos (35°30′N 27°18′E) by Tricheco (Regia Marina). All 45 crew were lost.
Hecht	Germany	World War II: The fishing trawler (222 GRT) was sunk by enemy action.
Natia	United Kingdom	World War II: The cargo ship (8,273 GRT) as shelled and sunk in the South Atlantic (0°44′N 32°12′W) by Thor (Kriegsmarine) with the loss of two of her 86 crew. Survivors were made prisoners of war and two of them died in captivity in France and Germany.

== 9 October ==
List of shipwrecks: 9 October 1940
Ship	State	Description
Alderney Queen	United Kingdom	World War II: The cargo ship (633 GRT) was bombed and sunk in the Bristol Channel off Grassholm, Pembrokeshire (51°38′30″N 5°25′30″W) by Luftwaffe aircraft. Her 10 crew were rescued.
Antonietta Costa	Italy	World War II: The cargo ship (5,900 GRT) was torpedoed and Adriatic Sea off Durrës, Albania (41°21′N 18°52′E) by HMS Regent (Royal Navy). One crew was killed and two or three wounded. The damaged ship was towed and beached the next day near Durrës (41°17′N 19°25′E), sinking in shallow water. It was planned to raise and repair her but this was finally cancelled.
Delphin	Greece	World War II: Convoy SC 6: The cargo ship (3,816 GRT) was torpedoed and damaged in the Atlantic Ocean west of Ireland (58°11′N 13°57′W) by U-103 (Kriegsmarine). She sank the next day at 57°46′N 13°50′W. Her whole crew was rescued.
Graigwen	United Kingdom	World War II: Convoy SC 6: The cargo ship (3,697 GRT) straggled behind the convoy. She was torpedoed and damaged in the Atlantic Ocean west of the Outer Hebrides (58°11′N 13°57′W) by U-103 (Kriegsmarine) with the loss of seven of her 37 crew. The survivors abandoned her and were rescued by HMS Enchantress (Royal Navy). The empty boat was torpedoed again the next day by U-123 (Kriegsmarine) and sunk.
HMT Sea King	Royal Navy	World War II: The 138.5-foot (42.2 m) minesweeping naval trawler (321 GRT) struck a mine in the Humber Estuary and sank with the loss of thirteen crew.
Zannes Gounaris	Greece	World War II: Convoy SC 6: The cargo ship (4,407 GRT) was torpedoed and sunk in the Atlantic Ocean west of the Outer Hebrides (58°11′N 13°57′W) by U-103 (Kriegsmarine) with the loss of one of her 34 crew.

== 10 October ==
List of shipwrecks: 10 October 1940
Ship	State	Description
HMT Girl Mary	Royal Navy	World War II: The auxiliary patrol vessel struck a mine and sank in the Firth of Forth 4 nautical miles (7.4 km) off Inchcolm with the loss of two of her seven crew.

== 11 October ==
List of shipwrecks: 11 October 1940
Ship	State	Description
HMY Aisha	Royal Navy	World War II: The naval yacht (117 GRT) struck a mine and sank in the Thames Estuary off the Isle of Sheppey, Kent. Her crew were rescued.
Brandanger	Norway	World War II: Convoy HX 77: The cargo ship (4,624 GRT) was torpedoed and sunk in the Atlantic Ocean west of the Hebrides, United Kingdom (57°10′N 17°00′W) by U-48 (Kriegsmarine) with the loss of six of her 30 crew. Survivors were rescued by Clan Macdonald (United Kingdom) and HMS Clarkia (Royal Navy).
Falcon	United States	The fishing vessel (10 GRT) was destroyed by fire 1/2 nautical mile (0.93 km) off Hood Bay (57°23′N 134°24′W) Alaska Territory. All four people on board survived.
HMT Listrac	Royal Navy	World War II: The naval trawler (778 GRT) was torpedoed and sunk in the English Channel off the Isle of Wight (50°25′N 1°50′W) by Greif (Kriegsmarine) with the loss of twelve of 36 crew.
Port Gisborne	United Kingdom	World War II: The cargo ship (8?390 GRT) was torpedoed and sunk in the Atlantic Ocean west of the Outer Hebrides (56°38′N 16°40′W) by U-48 (Kriegsmarine) with the loss of 26 of her 64 crew. Survivors were rescued by Salvona (United Kingdom).
Tiny Boy	United States	The motorboat (27 GRT) sank 1.5 nautical miles (2.8 km; 1.7 mi) off shore between Funter Bay and Point Retreat, Territory of Alaska. All six crew members survived.
HMT Warwick Deeping	Royal Navy	World War II: The naval trawler was shelled and sunk in the English Channel off the Isle of Wight (50°25′N 1°50′W) by Falke and Kondor (both Kriegsmarine). All crew were rescued.

== 12 October ==
List of shipwrecks: 12 October 1940
Ship	State	Description
Agba	United Kingdom	The cargo ship (498 GRT) was sunk in a collision with the steamer Mano off Sanda Island, Scotland.
Airone	Regia Marina	World War II: Battle of Cape Passero: The Spica-class torpedo boat was shelled and sunk in the Ionian Sea (35°37′N 16°42′E) by HMS Ajax (Royal Navy). There were 59 dead. Eighty-four survivors were rescued by Alcione and by MAS torpedo boats (all Regia Marina).
Ariel	Regia Marina	World War II: Battle of Cape Passero: The Spica-class torpedo boat was shelled and sunk in the Ionian Sea (35°37′N 16°42′E) by HMS Ajax (Royal Navy). There were 98 dead and 41 survivors.
Artigliere	Regia Marina	World War II: Battle of Cape Passero: The Soldati-class destroyer was shelled and severely damaged in the Ionian Sea by HMS Ajax (Royal Navy) and then shelled and sunk at (35°47′N 16°25′E) by HMS York (Royal Navy). There were 132 dead and 122 survivors. The wreck was located in June 2017.
Astrid	United Kingdom	World War II: The motor yacht and sunk by a mine off Sheerness, Kent.
B D Co. No. 2	United States	The scow (54 GRT) foundered 70 nautical miles (130 km; 81 mi) south south west of Cape Etolin, Territory of Alaska. No one was aboard her when she sank.
Brandenburg	Germany	World War II: The rescue ship (438 GRT) was torpedoed and sunk in the English Channel off Calais, France by MTB 22, MTB 31 and MTB 32 (all Royal Navy) with the loss of fifteen lives. Thirty-four survivors of Brandenburg and Nordenham were taken as prisoners of war.
Chasseur 6	Royal Navy	World War II: The submarine chaser, a former French Navy ship, was torpedoed and sunk by Greif (Kriegsmarine) with the loss of eight of her nineteen crew. Survivors were rescued by Greif and made prisoners of war.
Chasseur 7	Royal Navy	World War II: The submarine chaser, a former French Navy ship, was torpedoed and sunk by Greif (Kriegsmarine) with the loss of twelve of her nineteen crew. Survivors were rescued by Greif and made prisoners of war.
Davanger	Norway	World War II: Convoy HX 77: The tanker (7,102 GRT) was torpedoed and sunk in the Atlantic Ocean west of the Outer Hebrides, United Kingdom (57°00′N 19°10′W) by U-48 (Kriegsmarine) with the loss of 18 of her 30 crew.
Nordenham	Germany	World War II: The rescue ship (234 GRT) was torpedoed and sunk in the English Channel off Calais by MTB 22. MTB 31 and MTB 32 (all Royal Navy) with the loss of 13 lives. Thirty-four survivors of Brandenburg and Nordenham were taken as prisoners of war.
Orao	Yugoslavia	World War II: The cargo ship (5,135 GRT) was torpedoed and sunk in the Atlantic Ocean west of Gibraltar (35°34′N 10°35′W) by Enrico Tazzoli (Regia Marina) with the loss of two of her 35 crew.
Pacific Ranger	United Kingdom	World War II: Convoy HX 77: The cargo ship (6,865 GRT) was torpedoed and sunk in the Atlantic Ocean north west of County Donegal, Ireland (56°20′N 11°43′W) by U-59 (Kriegsmarine). All 53 crew and 2 passengers survived. Some were rescued by one of the escorting ships, others by the fishing trawler Þormóður ( Iceland) and some made land in their lifeboat.
HMT Resolvo	Royal Navy	World War II: The naval trawler struck a mine in the Thames Estuary north east of Sheerness, Kent and was severely damaged. Her whole crew was rescued by HMT Peter Carey (Royal Navy), two of them wounded. Resolvo was beached the next day at Sheerness and abandoned.
S 37	Kriegsmarine	World War II: The E-boat struck a mine and sank in the North Sea 40 nautical miles (74 km) east of Orfordness, Suffolk, United Kingdom. Thirteen of her 26 crew were killed and two of the survivors later died of their wounds after being rescued by S 30 (Kriegsmarine).
Saint Malô	Canada	World War II: Convoy HX 77: The cargo ship (5,779 GRT) straggled behind the convoy. She was torpedoed and sunk in the Atlantic Ocean west of the Outer Hebrides, United Kingdom (57°58′N 16°32′W) by U-101 (Kriegsmarine) with the loss of 28 of her 44 crew. Survivors were rescued by HMS Salvonia (Royal Navy).

== 13 October ==
List of shipwrecks: 13 October 1940
Ship	State	Description
Cargo Fleet No.2	United Kingdom	World War II: The hopper barge struck a mine and was damaged off the mouth of the River Tees. She was declared a total loss.
HMS Danube III	Royal Navy	World War II: The tug struck a mine and sank in the Thames Estuary north east of Sheerness, Kent. Eleven of her crew were killed.
Glynwen	United Kingdom	The collier (1,076 GRT) on a trip from Workington for Devonport with a cargo of coal, sank in the Irish Sea after striking a submerged object.
Hollandia	Sweden	The cargo ship (1,933 GRT) was rammed by the cargo ship Poseidon (Finland) in the Baltic Sea off Landsort, Sweden, and sank in one minute with her ore cargo. 13 of her crew were lost. The nine survivors were rescued by Poseidon.
Kobold 1	Kriegsmarine	World War II: The auxiliary minesweeper struck a mine (probably laid by HMS Narwhal (Royal Navy)) and sank off the Osterfjord, Norway (59°26′N 5°10′E). Exact casualties are not known but the names of six crew who died that day are known.
Kobold 3	Kriegsmarine	World War II: The auxiliary minesweeper struck a mine (probably laid by HMS Narwhal (Royal Navy)) and sank off the Osterfjord, Norway (59°26′N 5°10′E). Exact casualties are not known but the names of seven crew who died that day are known.
M 5207 Gnom 7	Kriegsmarine	World War II: The auxiliary minesweeper (49 GRT) struck a mine (probably laid by HMS Narwhal (Royal Navy)) and sank off the Osterfjord, Norway (59°26′N 5°10′E) with the loss of seven lives.
Nora	Estonia	World War II: The cargo ship (1,186 GRT) was torpedoed and sunk in the Atlantic Ocean west of the Outer Hebrides, United Kingdom (57°02′N 13°11′W) by U-103 (Kriegsmarine). Nineteen survivors were rescued by HMS Leith (Royal Navy). It is not known if there were casualties.
Stangrant	United Kingdom	World War II: Convoy HX 77: The cargo ship (5,804 GRT) straggled behind the convoy. She was torpedoed and sunk in the Atlantic Ocean west of the Outer Hebrides (58°27′N 12°36′W) by U-37 (Kriegsmarine) with the loss of eight of her 38 crew. Survivors were rescued by a Short Sunderland aircraft of 10 Squadron, Royal Australian Air Force.
HMT Summer Rose	Royal Navy	World War II: The Admiralty drifter (96 GRT) struck a mine and sank in the North Sea off Sunderland, County Durham. Two of her crew were killed.

== 14 October ==
List of shipwrecks: 14 October 1940
Ship	State	Description
HMS Cheshire	Royal Navy	World War II: The armed merchant cruiser (10,552 GRT) was torpedoed and damaged in the Atlantic Ocean north west of Ireland (55°13′N 13°02′W) by U-137 (Kriegsmarine). There were no casualties. Two hundred and twenty crew were rescued by HMS Periwinkle (Royal Navy) and HMCS Skeena (Royal Canadian Navy). HMS Cheshire was towed to Belfast Lough and beached. She was later repaired and returned to service.
Euler	Kriegsmarine	World War II: The supply ship (1,879 GRT) struck a mine and sank in the Bay of Biscay off Saint-Nazaire, Loire-Inférieure, France (47°11′50″N 2°18′40″W. She was subsequently refloated and scrapped.
Genua	Kriegsmarine	World War II: Operation DN: The netlayer (1,950 GRT) was torpedoed and sunk off Egersund, Norway by HMS Cossack (Royal Navy) with the loss of 78 of her 160 crew.
HMT Lord Stamp	Royal Navy	World War II: The naval trawler (448 GRT) struck a mine in the English Channel 17 nautical miles (31 km) off Portland Bill, Dorset and sank with the loss of all 25 crew.
Netze	Luftwaffe	World War II: Operation DN: The transport (1,025 GRT) was shelled and set on fire off Egersund, Norway by HMS Ashanti and HMS Maori (both Royal Navy). She was scuttled by gunfire from M 1106 (Kriegsmarine) some hours later. Ten crew were killed, and two of the eleven survivors were wounded.
Reculver	United Kingdom	World War II: The pilot vessel (683 GRT) struck a mine and sank in the Humber Estuary south of Spurn Point, Yorkshire. All 31 crew were rescued.

== 15 October ==
List of shipwrecks: 15 October 1940
Ship	State	Description
HMD Apple Tree	Royal Navy	The drifter (84 GRT) sank after a collision with RAF Pinnace No.50 in Oban Harbour. Her crew was saved.
Bellavale	United Kingdom	The collier (477 GRT) on a passage from Dundalk for Ayr in ballast, was driven ashore in a storm at St John's Point, Rossglass, County Down and was wrecked.
Bonheur	United Kingdom	World War II: Convoy OB 228: The cargo ship (5,327 GRT) was torpedoed and sunk in the Atlantic Ocean (57°10′N 8°36′W) by U-138 (Kriegsmarine). All 39 crew were rescued by HMT Sphene Royal Navy).
Hurunui	United Kingdom	World War II: Convoy OB 227: The cargo ship (9,331 GRT) was torpedoed and sunk in the Atlantic Ocean north west of the Outer Hebrides (58°58′N 9°54′W) by U-93 (Kriegsmarine) with the loss of two of her 75 crew. Survivors were rescued by St Margaret (United Kingdom) and transferred to HMS Fowey (Royal Navy).
Marly	Norway	The cargo ship (1,115 GRT) foundered in a cyclone in the Indian Ocean. Her last reported position was 18°30′N 72°21′E. Her whole crew (5 Norwegian officers and 41 Chinese sailors) was lost.
HMT Mistletoe	Royal Navy	World War II: The river patrol vessel (46 GRT) struck a mine and sank in the Humber Estuary south of Spurn Point, Yorkshire with the loss of four of her six crew.
Ringwood	Norway	World War II: The cargo ship (7,203 GRT) was captured in the Pacific Ocean north of Australia (5°29′N 159°42′E) by Orion (Kriegsmarine) and was scuttled with explosives. Her 36 crew were all taken aboard the raider.
Thistlegarth	United Kingdom	World War II: Convoy OB 228: The cargo ship (4,747 GRT) was torpedoed and sunk in the Atlantic Ocean north west of the Outer Hebrides (58°34′N 15°00′W) by U-103 (Kriegsmarine) with the loss of 30 of her 39 crew. Survivors were rescued by HMS Heartsease (Royal Navy).
HMS Triad	Royal Navy	World War II: The T-class submarine was shelled and sunk in the Gulf of Taranto 50 nautical miles (93 km) south of Cape Collonne, Italy (38°15′N 17°37′E) by Enrico Toti (Regia Marina) with the loss of all 52 crew.

== 16 October ==
List of shipwrecks: 16 October 1940
Ship	State	Description
Cimcour	France	World War II: The coaster (250 GRT) was torpedoed and sunk in the Bay of Biscay off Île d'Yeu (45°44′N 3°45′W) by HMS Tigris (Royal Navy). Three of her six crew were killed.
HMS Dundalk	Royal Navy	World War II: the Hunt-class minesweeper was heavily damaged by striking a mine in the North Sea off Harwich, Essex, England (51°57′N 1°27′E), and foundered the next day while under tow by HMS Sutton (Royal Navy). Three of her crew were missing and one died of his wounds.
Kabalo	Belgium	World War II: The cargo ship (5,074 GRT) was shelled and sunk in the Atlantic Ocean off the Azores, Portugal (31°59′N 31°20′W) by Comandante Cappellini (Regia Marina) with the loss of one of her 43 crew. Twenty-six survivors were rescued by Comandante Cappelini and landed three days later on the island of Santa Maria in the Azores. The 16 other were rescued by Pan American (United States).
L. C. Høyer	Denmark	The fishing boat (13 GRT) was wrecked after running aground near Greena Lighthouse, Denmark. Her three crew all reached land safely.
MTB 106	Royal Navy	World War II: The Thorneycroft MTB 106-class motor torpedo boat struck a mine and sank in the Thames Estuary north of Sheerness, Kent. The only casualty was a wounded crew.
Pride	United Kingdom	World War II: The fishing vessel (25 GRT) struck a mine and sank in the North Sea off Scarborough, Yorkshire with the loss of all three crew.
Trevisa	Canada	World War II: Convoy SC 7: The cargo ship (1,813 GRT) straggled behind the convoy. She was torpedoed and sunk in the Atlantic Ocean (57°28′N 20°30′W) by U-124 (Kriegsmarine) with the loss of seven of her 21 crew. Survivors were rescued by HMS Bluebell (Royal Navy).
Verace	Italy	World War II: The cargo ship (1,219 GRT) struck a mine and sank in the Mediterranean Sea off Benghazi, Libya. Her crew survived, four of them being wounded.

== 17 October ==
List of shipwrecks: 17 October 1940
Ship	State	Description
Aenos	Greece	World War II: Convoy SC 7: The cargo ship (3,554 GRT) was shelled and sunk in the Atlantic Ocean by U-38 (Kriegsmarine) with the loss of four of her 29 crew. Survivors were rescued by Eaglescliffe Hall (United Kingdom).
Albatross	United Kingdom	World War II: The fishing vessel (15 GRT) struck a mine and sank in the North Sea off Grimsby, Lincolnshire. Five of her crew were killed.
HMS Ashanti	Royal Navy	The Tribal-class destroyer hit rocks at high speed off Whitburn, County Durham (54°47′05″N 1°21′00″W) and was severely damaged. There were no casualties. She was refloated on 1 November, repaired and returned to service in June 1941.
Cheerful	Faroe Islands	World War II: The fishing trawler (65 GRT) struck a mine and sank in the Faroe Islands off Skopun. All seven crew were killed.
Craft Transport No.2	Canada	The barge (150 GRT) was cut in two in a collision with Gypsum Empress (United Kingdom) and sank north of Hell Gate, East River, New York. One crew was lost with her, while the other six survived.
Dokka	Norway	World War II: Convoy OB 228: The cargo ship (1,168 GRT) was torpedoed and sunk in the Atlantic Ocean south of Iceland (60°46′N 16°30′W) by U-93 (Kriegsmarine) with the loss of ten of her seventeen crew. Survivors were rescued by HMS Folkestone (Royal Navy).
HMS Fame	Royal Navy	The F-class destroyer hit rocks at high speed off Whitburn, County Durham (54°47′05″N 1°21′00″W). She was severely damaged, and fire broke out in her stokehold. There were no casualties. She was refloated on 1 December, repaired and returned to service in September 1942.
Frankrig	United Kingdom	World War II: The cargo ship (1,361 GRT) struck a mine and sank in the North Sea off Orford Ness, Suffolk (52°03′N 1°48′E). Her nineteen crew were rescued by HMS Holderness (Royal Navy).
Gasfire	United Kingdom	World War II: Convoy FN 11: the collier (2,972 GRT) was torpedoed by S 24 (Kriegsmarine) in the North Sea 6 nautical miles (11 km) north-northeast of Smith's Knoll off Cromer, Norfolk, blowing off her stern, disabling her and killing ten merchant sailors and one Royal Navy gunner. She was beached at Spurn Head, Yorkshire, but was later repaired and returned to service.
Hauxley	United Kingdom	World War II: Convoy FN 311: The cargo (1,595 GRT) ship was torpedoed and damaged in the North Sea 6 nautical miles (11 km) off Cromer by S-18 (Kriegsmarine) with the loss of a crew member. She was taken in tow by HMS Worcester (Royal Navy) but sank the next day at 50°03′00″N 1°35′30″E.
Janna A.	Netherlands	World War II: The clipper struck a mine and sank in the Oosterschelde, Zeeland, Netherlands. Two of the three brothers who crewed the vessel lost their lives.
HMT Kingston Cairngorm	Royal Navy	World War II: The naval trawler (448 GRT) had been damaged by running aground on 29 January 1940 and was towed to be refitted for further service when she struck a mine in the English Channel south of the Isle of Portland, Dorset. She was taken in tow but sank the next day (50°23′N 2°42′W). There were no casualties.
Languedoc	United Kingdom	World War II: Convoy SC 7: The tanker (9,512 GRT) was torpedoed and damaged in the Atlantic Ocean (59°14′N 17°51′W) by U-48 (Kriegsmarine). All 41 crew were rescued, most of them by HMS Bluebell (Royal Navy). The ship was declared beyond salvage and was scuttled by HMS Bluebell.
P.L.M.14	United Kingdom	World War II: Convoy FN 11: the cargo was torpedoed by S 27 (Kriegsmarine) in the North Sea off Smith's Knoll off Cromer, Norfolk, killing eight merchant sailors. She was towed to safety, repaired and returned to service.
Scoresby	United Kingdom	World War II: Convoy SC 7: The cargo ship (3,483 GRT) was torpedoed and sunk in the Atlantic Ocean (59°14′N 17°51′W) by U-48 (Kriegsmarine). All 39 crew were rescued by HMS Bluebell (Royal Navy).
Uskbridge	United Kingdom	World War II: Convoy OB 228: The cargo ship (2,715 GRT) was torpedoed and sunk in the Atlantic Ocean west of the Outer Hebrides (60°40′N 15°50′W) by U-93 (Kriegsmarine) with the loss of two of her 29 crew. Survivors were rescued by Katwijk (Netherlands) and Montreal City (United Kingdom).

== 18 October ==
List of shipwrecks: 18 October 1940
Ship	State	Description
Beatus	United Kingdom	World War II: Convoy SC 7: The cargo ship (4,885 GRT) was torpedoed and sunk in the Atlantic Ocean (57°31′N 13°10′W) by U-46 (Kriegsmarine) Her 37 crew were rescued by HMS Bluebell (Royal Navy).
Boekelo	Netherlands	World War II: Convoy SC 7: The cargo ship (2,118 GRT) fell behind convoy SC 7 because she rescued survivors from Beatus (United Kingdom). She was torpedoed and damaged in the Atlantic Ocean (57°14′N 10°38′W) by U-100 (Kriegsmarine). She was torpedoed and sunk in the early hours of the next day by U-123 (Kriegsmarine). All 25 crew were rescued by HMS Fowey (Royal Navy).
Convallaria	Sweden	World War II: Convoy SC 7: The cargo ship (1,996 GRT) was torpedoed and sunk in the Atlantic Ocean west of the Outer Hebrides, United Kingdom (57°20′N 10°40′W) by U-46 (Kriegsmarine). Her crew were rescued by HMS Fowey (Royal Navy). There were no casualties.
Creekirk	United Kingdom	World War II: Convoy SC 7: The cargo ship (3,917 GRT) was torpedoed and sunk in the Atlantic Ocean west of the Outer Hebrides (57°30′N 11°10′W) by U-101 (Kriegsmarine) with the loss of all 36 crew.
Cuma	Italy	World War II: The cargo ship (8,260 GRT) on a passage from Porto Empedocle for Catania, struck a mine and sank in the Mediterranean Sea 12 nautical miles (22 km) east of Licata (37°01′50″N 14°06′12″E) with the loss of four lives.
Director II	United States	Director II The schooner ran aground off Gladstone, Queensland, Australia and was wrecked. The whole crew was saved.
Durbo	Regia Marina	World War II: The Adua-class submarine was depth charged and sunk in the Mediterranean Sea east of Gibraltar (34°54′N 4°17′W) by two Saunders-Roe London flying boats of 202 Squadron, Royal Air Force, and by HMS Firedrake and HMS Wrestler (both Royal Navy). All 46 crew survived and were captured.
Empire Miniver	United Kingdom	World War II: Convoy SC 7: The Design 1016 ship (6,055 GRT) was torpedoed and sunk in the Atlantic Ocean by U-99 (Kriegsmarine) with the loss of three of her 38 crew. Survivors were rescued by HMS Bluebell (Royal Navy).
Fiscus	United Kingdom	World War II: Convoy SC 7: The cargo ship (4,815 GRT) was torpedoed and sunk in the Atlantic Ocean (57°29′N 11°10′W) by U-99 (Kriegsmarine) with the loss of 38 of her 39 crew. The survivor was rescued by HMS Clematis (Royal Navy).
Gunborg	Sweden	World War II: Convoy SC 7: The cargo ship (1,572 GRT) was torpedoed and sunk in the Atlantic Ocean 150 nautical miles (280 km) west of the Outer Hebrides (57°14′N 11°00′W) by U-46 (Kriegsmarine). All 23 crew were rescued by HMS Bluebell (Royal Navy).
HMS H49	Royal Navy	World War II: The H-class submarine was depth charged and sunk in the North Sea off Texel, North Holland, Netherlands by UJ 116 and UJ 118 (both Kriegsmarine) with the loss of 26 of her 27 crew.
Niritos	Greece	World War II: Convoy SC 7: The cargo ship (3,854 GRT) was torpedoed and sunk in the Atlantic Ocean west of the Outer Hebrides (57°14′N 10°38′W) by U-99 (Kriegsmarine) with the loss of one of her 28 crew. Survivors were rescued by HMS Bluebell (Royal Navy).
Sandsend	United Kingdom	World War II: Convoy OB 229: The cargo ship (3,612 GRT) was torpedoed and sunk in the Atlantic Ocean 300 nautical miles (560 km) west north west of Rockall, Inverness-shire (58°12′N 21°29′W) by U-38 (Kriegsmarine) with the loss of five of her 39 crew. Survivors were rescued by HMS Hibiscus (Royal Navy).
Shekatika	United Kingdom	World War II: Convoy SC 7: The cargo ship (5,458 GRT) 'romped' ahead of the convoy. She was torpedoed and damaged 90 nautical miles (170 km) east south east of Rockall (57°12′N 11°08′W) by U-123. U-100 (Kriegsmarine) fired a coup de grâce which did not sink her. All 36 crew were rescued by HMS Fowey (Royal Navy). The next day, U-123 fired another torpedo, which sank her at that location.

== 19 October ==
List of shipwrecks: 19 October 1940
Ship	State	Description
Aridity	United Kingdom	World War II: The coaster (336 GRT) struck a mine and sank in the Thames Estuary near the Oaze Lightship ( Trinity House), north east of the Isle of Sheppey, Kent. The whole crew was saved.
Assyrian	United Kingdom	World War II: Convoy SC 7: The cargo ship (2,962 GRT) was torpedoed and sunk in the Atlantic Ocean (57°12′N 10°43′W) by U-101 (Kriegsmarine) with the loss of seventeen of the 51 people aboard. The survivors were rescued by HMS Leith (Royal Navy).
Bilderdijk	Netherlands	World War II: Convoy HX 79: The cargo ship (6,865 GRT) was torpedoed and sunk in the Atlantic Ocean (56°35′N 17°15′W) by U-38 (Kriegsmarine). Her 39 crew were rescued by HMS Jason (Royal Navy).
HMCS Bras d'Or	Royal Canadian Navy	The minesweeper (269 GRT) sank for an unknown reason in the Gulf of St. Lawrence with the loss of all 30 crew.
Clintonia	United Kingdom	World War II: Convoy SC 7: The cargo ship (3,106 GRT) was torpedoed and damaged west of the Outer Hebrides (57°10′N 11°20′W) by U-99 (Kriegsmarine). Clintonia was then shelled and sunk by U-123 with the loss of one of her 35 crew.
Empire Brigade	United Kingdom	World War II: Convoy SC 7: The cargo ship (5,154 GRT) was torpedoed and sunk in the Atlantic Ocean (57°12′N 10°43′W) by U-99 (Kriegsmarine), with the loss of six of her 41 crew. Survivors were rescued by HMS Fowey (Royal Navy.
Matheran	United Kingdom	World War II: Convoy HX 79: The cargo ship (7,653 GRT) was torpedoed and sunk in the Atlantic Ocean west of the Hebrides (57°00′N 17°00′W) by U-38 (Kriegsmarine) with the loss of nine of her 81 crew. Survivors were rescued by Loch Lomond (United Kingdom).
Ruperra	United Kingdom	World War II: Convoy HX 79: The cargo ship (4,548 GRT) was torpedoed and sunk in the Atlantic Ocean 90 nautical miles (170 km) south west of Rockall, Inverness-shire (57°00′N 16°00′W) by U-46 (Kriegsmarine with the loss of 30 crew and one gunner. The seven survivors were rescued by Induna (United Kingdom).
Sedgepool	United Kingdom	World War II: Convoy SC 7: The cargo ship (5,556 GRT) was torpedoed and sunk in the Atlantic Ocean west of the Outer Hebrides (57°20′N 11°22′W) by U-123 (Kriegsmarine) with the loss of three of her 39 crew. Survivors were rescued by HMS Salvonia (Royal Navy).
Shirak	United Kingdom	World War II: Convoy HX 79: The tanker (6,023 GRT) was torpedoed and damaged in the Atlantic Ocean 90 nautical miles (170 km) south west of Rockall (57°00′N 16°53′W) by U-47 (Kriegsmarine). She was abandoned by her crew and was then torpedoed and sunk in the early hours of the next day by U-48 (Kriegsmarine). Her 37 crew were rescued by HMT Blackfly (Royal Navy).
Snefjeld	Norway	World War II: Convoy SC 7: The cargo ship (1,644 GRT) was torpedoed and sunk in the Atlantic Ocean (57°28′N 11°10′W) by U-99 (Kriegsmarine). All 21 crew survived and were rescued by HMS Clematis (Royal Navy) on 23 October.
Soesterberg	Netherlands	World War II: Convoy SC 7: The cargo ship (1,904 GRT) was torpedoed and sunk in the Atlantic Ocean (57°12′N 10°43′W) by U-101 (Kriegsmarine) with the loss of six of her 25 crew. Survivors were rescued by HMS Leith (Royal Navy).
Thalia	Greece	World War II: Convoy SC 7: The cargo ship (5,875 GRT) was torpedoed and sunk in the Atlantic Ocean west of the Outer Hebrides (57°00′N 11°30′W) by U-99 (Kriegsmarine) with the loss of 22 of her 26 crew.
Uganda	United Kingdom	World War II: Convoy HX 79: The cargo ship (4,996 GRT) was torpedoed and sunk in the Atlantic Ocean west of the Outer Hebrides (56°37′N 17°15′W) by U-47 (Kriegsmarine). Her 40 crew were rescued by HMS Jason (Royal Navy).
HMT Velia	Royal Navy	World War II: The 130.2-foot (39.7 m), 290-ton naval trawler struck a mine and sank in the North Sea 8 miles Southeast of South Ship Head, Shipwash, Thames River Estuary, or off the Kentish Knock Lightship ( Trinity House) (51°48′05″N 1°44′00″E). Her crew were rescued by HMT Hekla and HMT Stella Carina (both Royal Navy).
HMS Venetia	Royal Navy	World War II: The V-class destroyer struck a mine and sank in the North Sea off Margate, Kent (51°33′N 1°10′E). 35 crew were killed and 18 of the 84 survivors were wounded.
Wandby	United Kingdom	World War II: Convoy HX 79: The cargo ship (4,947 GRT) was torpedoed in the Atlantic Ocean west of the Outer Hebrides (56°45′N 17°07′W) by U-46 or U-47 (both Kriegsmarine). She remained afloat on her cargo of lumber until she sank on 21 October. Her 34 crew were rescued by HMT Angle (Royal Navy) and Indira (Norway).

== 20 October ==
List of shipwrecks: 20 October 1940
Ship	State	Description
British Colonel	United Kingdom	World War II: Attack on convoy BN 7: The tanker was shelled in the Red Sea, southwest of the Farasan Islands, by Pantera (Regia Marina) with the loss of one of her lifeboats, set ablaze by an explosion. The crude oil tanker spent six months in Suez for repairs until 17 April 1941.
Caprella	United Kingdom	World War II: Convoy HX 79: The tanker (8,230 GRT) on a trip from Curaçao for Mersey with a cargo of fuel oil was torpedoed and sunk in the Atlantic Ocean north west of County Donegal, Ireland (56°37′N 17°15′W) by U-100 (Kriegsmarine) with the loss of one of her 53 crew. Survivors were rescued by HMT Angle and HMT Lady Elsa (both Royal Navy).
Conakrian	United Kingdom	World War II: Convoy OA 232: The cargo ship (4,876 GRT) was torpedoed and damaged in the North Sea 9 nautical miles (17 km) off Girdleness, Aberdeenshire by a Luftwaffe Heinkel He 115 floatplane. She was taken in tow by HMS Cleveland and reached Aberdeen but started to list heavily in bad weather in the early hours of the 23rd and was abandoned. She later stranded at Bridge of Don, Aberdeenshire. She was later raised and repaired. There were no casualties.
Cubano	Norway	World War II: Convoy OB 229: The cargo ship (5,810 GRT) on a passage from Manchester for Montreal in ballast, was torpedoed and sunk west of the Outer Hebrides, United Kingdom (57°55′N 25°00′W) by U-124 (Kriegsmarine) with the loss of two of her 35 crew. Survivors were rescued by HMCS Saguenay (Royal Canadian Navy).
Janus	Sweden	World War II: Convoy HX 79: The tanker (9,965 GRT) on a voyage from Curaçao for Clyde with a cargo of fuel oil, straggled behind the convoy. She was torpedoed and sunk in the Atlantic Ocean north west of County Donegal (56°36′N 15°03′W) by U-46 (Kriegsmarine) with the loss of four of her 37 crew. Survivors were rescued by HMS Hibiscus (Royal Navy).
La Estancia	United Kingdom	World War II: Convoy HX 79: The cargo ship (5,185 GRT) on a trip from Mackay for Middlesbrough with a cargo of sugar, was torpedoed and sunk in the Atlantic Ocean west of the Outer Hebrides (57°00′N 17°00′W) by U-47 (Kriegsmarine) with the loss of one of her 34 crew. Survivors were rescued by Indira (Norway).
Lafolè	Regia Marina	World War II: The Adua-class submarine was depth charged, rammed and sunk in the Mediterranean Sea north of Melilla, Spain (36°00′N 3°00′W) by HMS Gallant, HMS Griffin and HMS Hotspur (all Royal Navy). Forty of her 49 crew were killed. Survivors were rescued by HMS Gallant and HMS Hotspur.
Loch Lomond	United Kingdom	World War II: Convoy HX 79: The cargo ship (5,452 GRT) on a trip from Montreal for Immingham with a cargo of steel and lumber, straggled behind the convoy. She was shelled and sunk in the Atlantic Ocean north west of County Donegal (56°00′N 14°30′W) by U-100 (Kriegsmarine) with the loss of one of her 40 crew. Survivors, including all 72 from Matheran (United Kingdom) were rescued by HMS Jason (Royal Navy).
Sitala	United Kingdom	World War II: Convoy HX 79: The tanker (6,218 GRT) on a voyage from Curaçao for Manchester with a cargo of crude oil, was torpedoed and sunk in the Atlantic Ocean 150 nautical miles (280 km) south west of Rockall, Inverness-shire (56°37′N 17°15′W) by U-100 (Kriegsmarine) with the loss of one of her 44 crew. Survivors were rescued by HMT Angle and HMT Lady Elsa (both Royal Navy).
Sulaco	United Kingdom	World War II: Convoy OB 229: The 5,389 GRT cargo ship on a passage from Avonmouth for Victoria in ballast, was torpedoed and sunk in the Atlantic Ocean west of the Outer Hebrides (57°25′N 25°00′W) by U-124 (Kriegsmarine with the loss of 66 of her 67 crew. The survivor was rescued by HMCS Saguenay (Royal Canadian Navy).
Whitford Point	United Kingdom	World War II: Convoy HX 79: The cargo ship (5,026 GRT) on a trip from Baltimore for London with a cargo of steel, was torpedoed and sunk in the Atlantic Ocean 90 nautical miles (170 km) south west of Rockall (56°38′N 16°00′W) by U-47 (Kriegsmarine) with the loss of 36 of her 39 crew. The 3 survivors were rescued by HMS Sturdy (Royal Navy).

== 21 October ==
List of shipwrecks: 21 October 1940
Ship	State	Description
Astrid	Finland	World War II: The cargo ship (602 GRT) was sunk in the Gulf of Finland east of Gogland Island in a collision with S-102 (Soviet Navy). Ten of her crew were lost, three were rescued by the submarine.
Francesco Nullo	Regia Marina	World War II: Attack on convoy BN 7: The Sauro-class destroyer was shelled, torpedoed and sunk by HMS Kimberley (Royal Navy) off Harmi Island, Italian Somaliland. Eleven of her 120 crew were killed and 14 were wounded, 3 of them dying from their wounds in the next weeks.
Houston City	United Kingdom	World War II: The cargo ship (4,935 GRT) struck a mine and was damaged in the Thames Estuary north east of Leysdown-on-Sea, Kent. She was beached at 5°28′53″N 1°00′12″E. Salvage was abandoned on 1 November following repeated bombing during salvage efforts.
HMS MTB 17	Royal Navy	World War II: The BPB 60-foot-class motor torpedo boat (MTB) was severely damaged by an explosion, possibly caused by one of her own torpedoes, off Ostend, West Flanders, Belgium. Her whole crew survived and was picked up by other MTBs. The wreck was found the next day in shallow water by the Germans and towed to Ostend but was too heavily damaged and was scrapped.
HMT Waveflower	Royal Navy	World War II: The auxiliary minesweeping trawler (368 GRT) struck a mine and sank in the North Sea off Aldeburgh with the loss of 15 of her 22 crew. Survivors were rescued by HMT Thomas Leeds (Royal Navy).

== 22 October ==
List of shipwrecks: 22 October 1940
Ship	State	Description
Blue Beard	Canada	The sailfish (14 GRT) went missing off Flint, Nova Scotia, with five crew members.
Cairnglen	United Kingdom	The 5,019 GRT cargo ship on a trip from Montreal for Leith with general cargo, ran aground at Marsden, Northumberland (54°59′12″N 1°22′42″W). Her 49 crew were all rescued. She broke in two on 19 January 1941 and was declared a total loss.
HMT Joseph Button	Royal Navy	World War II: The Castle class minesweeping naval trawler struck a mine and sank in the North Sea off Aldeburgh, Suffolk with the loss of five of her crew.
HMT Hickory	Royal Navy	World War II: The Tree-class trawler struck a mine and sank in the English Channel south of the Isle of Portland, Dorset (50°26′24″N 2°45′48″W) with the loss of 23 of her crew.
Kerry Head	Ireland	World War II: The cargo ship (825 GRT) was bombed and sunk in the Atlantic Ocean off Cape Clear Island, County Cork, Ireland. All twelve crew were lost.
HMCS Margaree	Royal Canadian Navy	World War II: Convoy OL 8: The D-class destroyer collided with Port Fairy (United Kingdom) and sank in the Atlantic Ocean with the loss of 143 of her crew. The 34 survivors were rescued by Port Fairy.

== 23 October ==
List of shipwrecks: 23 October 1940
Ship	State	Description
Essie	Sweden	World War II: The fishing trawler (54 GRT) struck a mine and sank in the Skagerrak 10 nautical miles (19 km) south of Skagen, Denmark, with the loss of six of her crew.
Hannah	Sweden	World War II: The 1,196 GRT cargo ship on a trip from Cardiff for Leixões with a cargo of coal, ran aground and was wrecked outside of Leixões harbor.
Jean Nicolet	Canada	The motor vessel (20 GRT) sank in the port of Quebec City after a collision with North Gaspe (Canada).
Prinsesse Ragnhild	Norway	World War II: The 1,590 GRT passenger ship travelling from Bodø for Lofoten with 90 Norwegian passengers, a crew of 50 and about 140 German soldiers on board, struck a mine and sank in the Norwegian Sea off Landegode. 54 passengers, 25 crew and 69 Germans were lost.

== 24 October ==
List of shipwrecks: 24 October 1940
Ship	State	Description
Giasone	Italy	World War II: The cable ship was sunk by an Italian mine off Pantelleria. There were two dead and 83 survivors.
WBS 5 Adolf Vinnen	Kriegsmarine	World War II: The weather ship (384 GRT) was shelled and sunk off Stadtlandet, Norway (62°29′N 4°23′E) by HMS Matabele, HMS Punjabi and HMS Somali (all Royal Navy). Seven of her fourteen crew were killed during the sinking and two more died of exposure before the 5 survivors were rescued by the fishing trawler Odin (Norway).

== 25 October ==
List of shipwrecks: 25 October 1940
Ship	State	Description
Blairspey	United Kingdom	World War II: Convoy SC 7: Taken under tow after being torpedoed in the Atlantic Ocean east-northeast of Rockall, Inverness-shire on 18 October by U-101 (Kriegsmarine) and again on 19 October by U-100 (Kriegsmarine), the cargo ship was beached in the Clyde. She was repaired and returned to service.
Carlton	United Kingdom	World War II: The fishing trawler struck a mine at the mouth of the Humber and sank with the loss of three of her ten crew.
HMT Duthies	Royal Navy	World War II: The naval trawler was bombed and sunk at Montrose, Angus. Her crew were rescued.
Encourage	United Kingdom	World War II: The fishing trawler struck a mine and sank in the English Channel off Plymouth, Devon with the loss of all four crew.
Kyle Skye	United Kingdom	The coaster (311 GRT) on a passage from Campbeltown for Workington in ballast, ran aground in poor weather at Cleats Beach, on the south coast of the Isle of Arran, Bute and was wrecked.
HMT Lord Inchcape	Royal Navy	World War II: The naval trawler struck a mine and sank in the English Channel off Plymouth with the loss of a crew member. She was later salvaged.
South Goodwin Lightship	Trinity House	World War II: The lightship was bombed and sunk in the North Sea off St. Margarets Bay, Kent by Luftwaffe aircraft.
Sunbeam	United States	The fishing vessel sank in Cross Sound in the Alexander Archipelago off the side of George Island (58°12′00″N 136°23′45″W) facing Three Hill Island, Alaska Territory (58°09′58″N 136°23′43″W). One of the two people on board was lost.
Windsor	United Kingdom	World War II: The fishing vessel struck a mine and sank in the Humber south of Spurn Point, Yorkshire with the loss of a crew member.

== 26 October ==
List of shipwrecks: 26 October 1940
Ship	State	Description
Albi	Vichy France	World War II: The cargo ship was intercepted by HMS Delhi (Royal Navy) off the coast of Africa and was scuttled by her crew. She was on a voyage from Dakar to Libreville, French West Africa.
Dosinia	United Kingdom	World War II: The 8,053 GRT tanker on a passage from Stanlow for Table Bay in ballast, struck a mine, broke in two and sank in Liverpool Bay off Southport, Lancashire. Her 56 crew were rescued. The wreck was subsequently dispersed by explosives.
H. J. Kyvig	Norway	World War II: The 763 GRT coaster on a passage from Ballangen for Drammen with a cargo of pyrites was torpedoed and sunk in Sunnfjord off Gjeita by Royal Air Force aircraft with the loss of five of her crew.
V-71 Intrepido	Regia Marina	World War II: The requisitioned 551 GRT motor schooner on a trip from Benghasi for Tobruk struck a mine and sank off Deriana (32°28′N 20°16′E). Her crew were rescued by another sailing vessel. The mine was probably laid by HMS Rorqual (Royal Navy).
Matina	United Kingdom	World War II: The 5,389 GRT cargo ship on a trip from Port Antonio for Garston with a cargo of bananas, was torpedoed, shelled and damaged in the Atlantic Ocean west of the Outer Hebrides (57°30′N 16°31′W) by U-28 (Kriegsmarine). Her 69 crew took to the lifeboats, but were not seen again. Her drifting wreck was torpedoed and sunk on 29 October by U-31 (Kriegsmarine).
Strombus	Norway	World War II: The whale factory ship struck a mine and broke in two in the Bristol Channel off Swansea, Glamorgan, United Kingdom (51°33′48″N 3°56′48″W).The bow section capsized and sank. The stern section was beached. Her 40 crew were rescued by HMT Silja (Royal Navy) and Victor (United Kingdom). The stern section was refloated in 1942 and scrapped.

== 27 October ==
List of shipwrecks: 27 October 1940
Ship	State	Description
Gerda	Denmark	World War II: The fishing boat was sunk by a mine north of Frederikshavn, Denmark, with the loss of both crew.
Margaretha	Netherlands	World War II: The 325 GRT coaster on a passage from Newport for Plymouth, struck a mine and sank in the Bristol Channel off Barry Docks (51°22′N 3°12′W). Her crew were rescued.
Meggie	Sweden	World War II: The 1,583 GRT cargo ship on a trip from Dunston for Madeira with a cargo of coal, was shelled and sunk in the Atlantic Ocean 70 nautical miles (130 km) off Santa Maria Island, Azores, Portugal by Nani (Regia Marina). Her crew were rescued.
Persevere	United Kingdom	World War II: The drifter struck a mine and sank in the Firth of Forth. Both crew were rescued.
Suavity	United Kingdom	World War II: The 634 GRT coaster on a trip from Sunderland for London with a cargo of wheat, struck a mine and sank in the North Sea off Hartlepool, County Durham (54°44′N 1°05′W). Her crew were rescued.

== 28 October ==
List of shipwrecks: 28 October 1940
Ship	State	Description
Devonia	United Kingdom	World War II: The 98 GRT tug on a passage from Appledore for Avonmouth, struck a mine and sank in the Bristol Channel off Newport, Monmouthshire (51°23′N 3°15′W) with the loss of three of her four crew.
Empress of Britain	United Kingdom	World War II: The troopship was torpedoed and sunk in the Atlantic Ocean north west of Ireland (at 55°16′N 9°50′W) by U-32 (Kriegsmarine), after having been bombed and damaged by a Focke-Wulf Fw 200 Condor aircraft of 2 Staffeln, Kampfgeschwader 40, Luftwaffe with the loss of 45 of the 623 people on board.
HMT Harvest Gleaner	Royal Navy	World War II: The 96 GRT naval trawler was bombed and sunk in the North Sea off Southwold, Suffolk with the loss of four of her crew.
Malygin	Soviet Union	The icebreaker foundered in a storm off Kamchatka. All 98 aboard were lost.
Sagacity	United Kingdom	World War II: The 490 GRT coaster en route from Kings Lynn for Tyne with a cargo of grain, struck a mine and sank in the Humber south west of Spurn Point, Yorkshire. Her crew were rescued.
Sheaf Field	United Kingdom	World War II: The 2,719 GRT cargo ship on a passage from Tyne for London, struck a mine and sank in the North Sea off the mouth of the River Deben, Suffolk (51°58′45″N 1°27′15″E). Her 26 crew survived.
Wythburn	United Kingdom	World War II: The cargo ship struck a mine and sank in the Bristol Channel off Newport (51°22′N 3°15′W) with the loss of five of her crew.

== 29 October ==
List of shipwrecks: 29 October 1940
Ship	State	Description
G. W. Humphreys	United Kingdom	World War II: The sludge carrier struck a mine and sank in the East Oaze Deep, Thames Estuary, north of Leysdown-on-Sea, Kent with the loss of seven of her crew.

== 30 October ==
List of shipwrecks: 30 October 1940
Ship	State	Description
Alcora	United Kingdom	The 1,381 GRT cargo ship on a trip from San Juan for Tees with general cargo, came ashore 2 nautical miles (3.7 km) north of Rattray Head, Aberdeenshire (57°37′45″N 1°44′00″W) and was wrecked. Her crew survived.
Attendant	United Kingdom	The 357 GRT passenger tender on a passage from Stornoway for Oban in ballast, was wrecked in the Sound of Canna. Later raised, repaired and returned to service.
Baron Minto	United Kingdom	World War II: The 4,637 GRT cargo ship on a trip from Texas City for Hull with a cargo of steel and iron scrap, was driven ashore in the Loch of Strathbeg near Rattray Head (57°35′15″N 1°50′00″W). She was attacked by Luftwaffe aircraft between 11 November 1940 and 31 May 1941 and was consequently declared a constructive total loss on 9 May 1945.
Bragi	Iceland	The 321 GRT steam fishing trawler was sunk in a collision with Duke of York (United Kingdom) off the Wyre Light, Lancashire, United Kingdom.
Lisbon	United Kingdom	The 1,984 GRT cargo ship on a trip from Lisbon for London with general cargo, was driven ashore and wrecked 1 nautical mile (1.9 km) west of Rattray Head (57°37′10″N 1°47′00″W).
HMS ML 109	Royal Navy	World War II: The Fairmile A motor launch struck a mine near Chequer Shoal Buoy off the mouth of the Humber and sank with the loss of three of her crew.
Placidas Faroult	France	The auxiliary lugger was stranded and wrecked at Salcombe, Devon, United Kingdom.
Seagem	United Kingdom	The tugboat sank.
Simonburn	United Kingdom	The 5,213 GRT cargo ship on a trip from Montreal for London with a cargo of wheat, ran aground and became stranded between Rattray Head and Fraserburg and was subsequently wrecked. She floated off and sank.
HMS Sturdy	Royal Navy	World War II: Convoy SC 8: The S-class destroyer ran aground off Tiree, Inner Hebrides and was wrecked with the loss of five of her crew.
U-32	Kriegsmarine	World War II: The Type VIIA submarine was depth charged and sunk in the Atlantic Ocean north west of Ireland by HMS Harvester and HMS Highlander (both Royal Navy) with the loss of nine of her 42 crew. Survivors were rescued by HMS Harvester and HMS Highlander.
Victoria	Greece	World War II: Convoy SLS 51: The cargo ship was bombed and sunk in the Atlantic Ocean west of County Donegal, Ireland by Focke-Wulf Fw 200 aircraft of I Staffeln, Kampfgeschwader 40, Luftwaffe. Her 29 crew survived.

== 31 October ==
List of shipwrecks: 31 October 1940
Ship	State	Description
Hillfern	United Kingdom	The 1,535 GRT cargo ship on a trip from Sunderland for Cork with a cargo of coal, was bombed and sunk in the North Sea 35 nautical miles (65 km) off Buchan Ness, Aberdeenshire (57°57′00″N 2°25′30″W), by the Luftwaffe aircraft, with the loss of eight of her nineteen crew.
MTB 16	Royal Navy	World War II: The BPB 60-foot-class motor torpedo boat struck a mine and sank in the North Sea off Clacton-on-Sea, Essex.
Rutland	United Kingdom	World War II: Convoy HX 82: The 1,437 GRT cargo ship on a trip from Demerara for Larne with a cargo of bauxite and general cargo, straggled behind the convoy. She was torpedoed and sunk in the Atlantic Ocean west of the Outer Hebrides (58°45′N 16°00′W) by U-124 (Kriegsmarine) with the loss of all 29 crew.
HMT Wardour	Royal Navy	World War II: The 335 GRT naval trawler struck a mine and was abandoned in the North Sea. Her twelve crew were rescued by HMS Douglas (Royal Navy). The vessel stayed afloat and was subsequently repaired and returned to service.

== Unknown date ==
List of shipwrecks: Unknown date 1940
Ship	State	Description
Foca	Regia Marina	World War II: The Foca-class submarine left for a minelaying mission in the Mediterranean Sea off Haifa, Palestine but disappeared without a trace, probably between 12 and 16 October, with her 69 crew.
North Goodwin Lightship	Trinity House	The lightship was driven ashore at Walmer, Kent after her anchor chain broke in a storm.
Oscar Robinson	Australia	The ketch sank in the Pacific Ocean off Port Adelaide, South Australia.
