= SS Soesterberg =

Dutch cargo steamship

Coordinates: 57°12′N 10°43′W

History

Netherlands
- Name: Soesterberg
- Namesake: Soesterberg in the province of Utrecht
- Owner: Stoomboot Mij Hillegersberg NV
- Operator: Vinke & Co, Rotterdam
- Port of registry: Amsterdam
- Builder: Antwerp Engineering Co Ltd, Hoboken, Belgium
- Yard number: 90
- Completed: April 1927
- Out of service: 19 October 1940
- Identification: Code letters PSKN (until 1933); Call sign PHPG (1934–40); IMO number: 5606634
- Fate: Sunk by torpedo, 19 October 1940

General characteristics
- Class & type: cargo steamship
- Tonnage: (1939 onwards): 1,904 GRT; tonnage under deck 1,701; 1,117 NRT
- Length: 278.5 feet (84.9 m) p/p
- Beam: 40.2 feet (12.3 m)
- Draught: 17 feet 8 3/4 inches (5.40 m)
- Depth: 18.4 feet (5.6 m)
- Installed power: 214 NHP
- Propulsion: triple-expansion steam engine; single screw
- Speed: 10 knots (19 km/h)
- Crew: 25, including DEMS gunners (1940)
- Sensors & processing systems: wireless direction finding (1940)

SS Soesterberg was a Dutch-owned cargo steamship that was built in Belgium in 1927 and sunk by a U-boat in 1940 in the Battle of the Atlantic.

== Building ==
Antwerp Engineering Co Ltd, of Hoboken built the ship, completing her in April 1927. Her owner was Stoomboot Mij Hillegersberg NV, who named her after the town of Soesterberg in the province of Utrecht, registered her in Amsterdam and appointed Vinke & Co of Rotterdam to manage her.

Soesterberg had six corrugated furnaces with a combined grate area of 93 square feet (9 m^{2}) that heated two 180 lb_{f}/in^{2} single-ended boilers with a combined heating surface of 3,632 square feet (337 m^{2}). The boilers fed a three-cylinder triple expansion steam engine that was rated at 214 NHP and drove a single screw.

== Wartime career ==
After the German invasion of the Netherlands in May 1940 Soesterberg remained in Allied service, making transatlantic crossings between Canada and Britain. In June 1940 she sailed in Convoy OB 174 from Liverpool to Halifax, Nova Scotia. In July she returned from Halifax to Liverpool in Convoy HX 59 with a cargo of pit props. Early in September she sailed with Convoy OA 208 from Methil in Scotland to Halifax. Early in October she sailed from Chatham, New Brunswick, carrying 790 fathoms (1,440 m) of pit props bound for Hull. She went via Sydney, Nova Scotia, where she joined Convoy SC 7 bound for Liverpool.

== Sinking ==
SC 7 left Sydney on 5 October. At first the convoy had only one escort ship, the Hastings-class sloop HMS Scarborough. A wolf pack of U-boats found the convoy on 16 October and quickly overwhelmed it, sinking many ships over the next few days. At 0122 hours on 19 October SC 7 was about 102 nautical miles (189 km) west by north of Barra Head, Outer Hebrides when German submarine U-101, commanded by Fritz Frauenheim, fired three bow torpedoes at the convoy. Frauenheim followed this two minutes later with a stern torpedo. He hit two ships: Assyrian with a bow torpedo, and Soesterberg with the stern torpedo.

The explosion on Soesterberg blew four men overboard and wrecked her starboard lifeboat. The other survivors abandoned ship: three DEMS gunners on a liferaft, and the rest in the port lifeboat. A headcount showed that the men from the engine room were missing. The Master and the First Officer re-boarded the ship in search of them, but concluded they had been killed on watch below. The two officers then returned to the lifeboat.

The now abandoned Soesterberg remained afloat and drifting, as did the stricken Assyrian. Soesterberg collided with Assyrian's stern, then suddenly turned upright. Shortly thereafter Soesterberg sank, spilling her cargo of pit props, several of which fell on survivors of the Assyrian. This wrecked most of their liferafts, but the survivors then clung to the floating pit props as they awaited rescue.

Six of the 25 men aboard Soesterberg had been killed. One of her stokers survived the sinking and was rescued by a lifeboat from the Empire Brigade, which had been sunk by Otto Kretschmer's U-99 in the same Wolfpack attack. The Grimsby-class sloop HMS Leith rescued the various survivors and landed them at Greenock.
