= German submarine U-101 (1940) =

German World War II submarine

Coordinates: 54°07′N 10°50′E

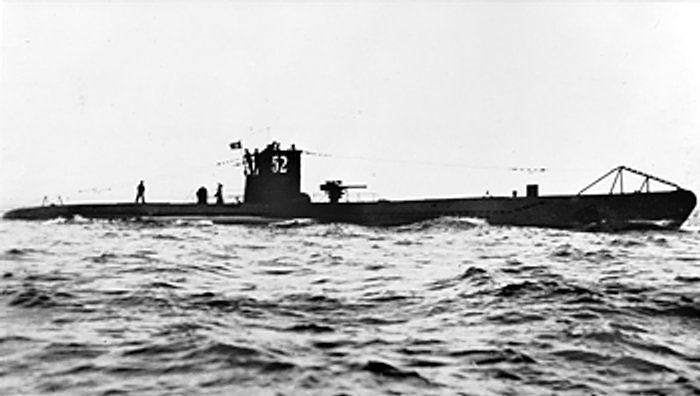
- U-52, a typical Type VIIB boat

History

Nazi Germany
- Name: U-101
- Ordered: 15 December 1937
- Builder: Germaniawerft, Kiel
- Yard number: 595
- Laid down: 31 March 1939
- Launched: 13 January 1940
- Commissioned: 11 March 1940
- Decommissioned: 22 October 1943
- Fate: Scuttled on 3 May 1945; wreck later scrapped
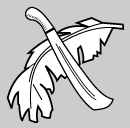
- Badge

General characteristics
- Class & type: Type VIIB U-boat
- Displacement: 753 t (741 long tons) surfaced; 857 t (843 long tons) submerged
- Length: 66.50 m (218 ft 2 in) o/a; 48.80 m (160 ft 1 in) pressure hull
- Beam: 6.20 m (20 ft 4 in) o/a; 4.70 m (15 ft 5 in) pressure hull
- Draught: 4.74 m (15 ft 7 in)
- Installed power: 2,800–3,200 PS (2,100–2,400 kW; 2,800–3,200 bhp) (diesels); 750 PS (550 kW; 740 shp) (electric)
- Propulsion: 2 shafts; 2 × diesel engines; 2 × electric motors
- Speed: 17.9 knots (33.2 km/h; 20.6 mph) surfaced; 8 knots (15 km/h; 9.2 mph)
- Range: 8,700 nmi (16,100 km; 10,000 mi) at 10 knots (19 km/h; 12 mph) surfaced; 90 nmi (170 km; 100 mi) at 4 knots (7.4 km/h; 4.6 mph) submerged
- Test depth: 230 m (750 ft); Calculated crush depth: 250–295 m (820–968 ft)
- Boats & landing craft carried: 1 inflatable rubber boat
- Complement: 4 officers, 40–56 enlisted
- Sensors & processing systems: Gruppenhorchgerät
- Armament: 5 × 53.3 cm (21 in) torpedo tubes: four bow, one stern; 14 × torpedoes or 26 TMA mines; 1 × 8.8 cm (3.5 in) deck gun with 220 rounds; 1 × 2 cm (0.79 in) C/30 anti-aircraft gun

Service record
- Part of: 7th U-boat Flotilla; 11 March 1940 – 28 February 1942; 26th U-boat Flotilla; 1 – 31 March 1942; 21st U-boat Flotilla; 1 April – 31 August 1942; 24th U-boat Flotilla; 1 September 1942 – 31 August 1943; 23rd U-boat Flotilla; 1 September – 22 October 1943
- Identification codes: M 15 344
- Commanders: Kptlt. Fritz Frauenheim; 11 March – 18 November 1940; Kptlt. Ernst Mengersen; 18 November 1940 – 31 December 1941; Oblt.z.S. Karl-Heinz Marbach; 1 January – 3 February 1942; Oblt.z.S. Friedrich Bothe; 4 February – 31 March 1942; Oblt.z.S. Ernst von Witzendorff; May – 25 October 1942; Oblt.z.S. Helmut Münster; 15 September 1942 – 22 October 1943
- Operations: 10 patrols: 1st patrol: a. 29 April – 3 May 1940; b. 5 – 10 May 1940; 2nd patrol: 21 May – 25 June 1940; 3rd patrol: 9 August – 16 September 1940; 4th patrol: 5 – 24 October 1940; 5th patrol: 24 November – 7 December 1940; 6th patrol: 23 January – 19 February 1941; 7th patrol: 24 March – 2 May 1941; 8th patrol: 28 May – 4 July 1941; 9th patrol: a. 7 August – 4 September 1941; b. 4 – 6 October 1941; 10th patrol: 11 October – 16 November 1941
- Victories: 22 merchant ships sunk (111,673 GRT); 1 warship sunk (1,190 tons); 2 merchant ships damaged (9,113 GRT)

German submarine U-101 was a Type VIIB U-boat of Nazi Germany's Kriegsmarine during World War II. She had a highly successful career.

== Design ==
German Type VIIB submarines were preceded by the shorter Type VIIA submarines. U-101 had a displacement of 753 tonnes (741 long tons) when at the surface and 857 tonnes (843 long tons) while submerged. She had a total length of 66.50 m (218 ft 2 in), a pressure hull length of 48.80 m (160 ft 1 in), a beam of 6.20 m (20 ft 4 in), a height of 9.50 m (31 ft 2 in), and a draught of 4.74 m (15 ft 7 in). The submarine was powered by two MAN M 6 V 40/46 four-stroke, six-cylinder supercharged diesel engines producing a total of 2,800 to 3,200 metric horsepower (2,060 to 2,350 kW; 2,760 to 3,160 shp) for use while surfaced, two AEG GU 460/8-276 double-acting electric motors producing a total of 750 metric horsepower (550 kW; 740 shp) for use while submerged. She had two shafts and two 1.23 m (4 ft) propellers. The boat was capable of operating at depths of up to 230 metres (750 ft).

The submarine had a maximum surface speed of 17.9 knots (33.2 km/h; 20.6 mph) and a maximum submerged speed of 8 knots (15 km/h; 9.2 mph). When submerged, the boat could operate for 90 nautical miles (170 km; 100 mi) at 4 knots (7.4 km/h; 4.6 mph); when surfaced, she could travel 8,700 nautical miles (16,100 km; 10,000 mi) at 10 knots (19 km/h; 12 mph). U-101 was fitted with five 53.3 cm (21 in) torpedo tubes (four fitted at the bow and one at the stern), fourteen torpedoes, one 8.8 cm (3.46 in) SK C/35 naval gun, 220 rounds, and one 2 cm (0.79 in) anti-aircraft gun The boat had a complement of between forty-four and sixty.

== Service history ==
U-101 was ordered on 15 December 1937 and laid down on 31 March 1939 at Germaniawerft, Kiel, as yard number 595. She was launched on 13 January 1940 and commissioned under her first commander Kapitänleutnant Fritz Frauenheim on 23 September of that year. Frauenheim commanded her for her work-up with the 7th U-boat Flotilla between 11 March and 18 November 1940. She then became a front (operational) boat, also with the 7th Flotilla and set out from Kiel to Trondheim in Norway on her first war patrol on 28 April 1940 in the North Sea.

=== Based at Kiel ===
Her first patrol took her to Trondheim and back to Kiel; it was largely uneventful. She sailed again from Kiel on 21 May on a second patrol that was to last 36 days and be highly successful, taking her around the perimeter of the British Isles, to the Western Approaches and the Portuguese coast. She sank a total of seven ships, for a total tonnage of 42,022 gross register tons (GRT). On 22 May she sighted an enemy submarine. On the 23rd she again sighted either the original enemy craft or another. A torpedo track was seen, but it passed 50 metres across her bow and she continued her journey. On 29 May, at 16:30 she was spotted and attacked by an aircraft, which dropped two bombs on U-101 as she was west of the English Channel. She suffered minor damage in this attack.

Her first victim was the British merchant ship Stanhall on 30 May. The next day she sank the British Orangemoor, but following this attack she was hunted by convoy escorts for four hours, during which they dropped 34 depth charges. When U-101 risked rising to periscope depth she was spotted by an armed trawler, which dropped another seven depth charges at 22:00, causing some damage. U-101 survived this encounter and went on to sink Polycarp on 2 June. She was attacked again on 4 June at 20.14 hours, this time by an aircraft which dropped a bomb as she sailed west of the English Channel. She escaped damage.

On 11 June she torpedoed and sank the Greek Mount Hymettus and on 12 June she claimed the British Earlspark. The final two successes came when she sank the Greek Antonis Georgandis on 14 June followed by the British Wellington Star on the 16th. Between 12 and 15 June U-101 operated as part of wolfpack Rösing. She was attacked again on 23 June at 04:08 while in the North Sea returning to base, when an aircraft dropped three bombs, damaging the periscope. She returned to Kiel on 25 June.

=== Based at Lorient ===
U-101's next patrol was less successful, but still claimed three merchantmen, totalling 2,311 GRT. She left Kiel on 9 August, passed north of the British Isles and the north-west coast of Ireland and arrived at Lorient in France 39 days later on 16 September. She sank the British Ampleforth on 19 August, the Finnish Elle on 28 August and the Greek Efploia on 1 September. While searching for a convoy west of Ireland on 3 September, she was attacked by an escort with depth charges in five separate efforts, when she suffered considerable damage and began to flood, which was controlled by the crew.

U-101 sailed again on 5 October for a shorter war patrol lasting 20 days. She operated in the North Atlantic, working to intercept convoys sailing to Britain. She sank the Canadian Saint-Malo on 12 October, before being one of a number of U-boats to launch a successful 'wolfpack' attack on Convoy SC 7. She damaged SS Blairspey and sank SS Creekirk on 18 October. The next day she sank SS Assyrian and SS Soesterberg. While carrying out a final attack she was sighted by one of the merchantmen, which shelled her. She was able to fire her last torpedoes and escape the shells that fell behind her. The merchant ship had turned away and began zig-zagging, and so escaped without being hit. U-101 returned to Lorient having sunk four ships totalling 14,562 GRT and damaged another for 4,155 GRT. On his return Frauenheim was relieved by Kptlt. Ernst Mengersen.

=== Under Mengersen ===
Mengersen undertook one last war patrol during 1940, sailing from Lorient on 24 November. Despite only lasting 14 days, this was another successful voyage. On 31 November the British Aractaca was sunk. The following day U-101 attacked convoy HX 90, sinking Appalachee and damaging Loch Ranza on 1 December. The following day she sank a further two ships from the convoy, Kavak and Lady Glanely. U-101 returned to Lorient on 7 December having sunk 22,483 GRT of shipping and damaged a further 4,958 GRT.

The boat's next patrol started with her departure from Lorient on 23 January. Despite spending 28 days at sea, this was one of U-101’s less successful cruises. While attempting to attack convoy SC 19 at 04:16 on 29 January, an escorting destroyer fired on her, forcing her to dive. The warship then dropped three depth charges, but these failed to cause any damage. U-101 later sank two ships, Belcrest on 14 February and Gairsoppa on the 17th. She arrived back at base on 19 February, having accounted for a further 10,699 GRT of Allied shipping. She sailed again on 24 March for her longest war patrol, lasting 40 days. This took her deep into the North Atlantic in search of enemy shipping. On 23 April she encountered a British submarine which fired two torpedoes at her, but both missed. U-101 returned to base on 2 May without having sunk or damaged any enemy ships.

Her next patrol began on 28 May and was slightly more successful. While operating further to the south of her previous location, she discovered the convoys OB 327 and 329 and sank the British merchant ships Trecarrell and Trevarrack on 4 and 9 June respectively. Also on 4 June she lost a man, Matrosenobergefreiter Horst Jackl, overboard. She returned to base on 4 July having accounted for 10,541 GRT of shipping.

U-101's next patrol took her from Lorient on 7 August. On 24 August at 09:53, she was attacked by an aircraft while off Rockall. Two bombs were dropped but failed to damage her. Nevertheless, U-101 was forced to crash-dive another five times that day and the next to avoid aircraft operating in the area. She then attempted to attack convoy OS-4 on 28 August but was forced to dive by a destroyer at 03:03. She was hunted for three hours by several of the convoy's escorts, which dropped 30 depth charges. Despite the accuracy of these attacks, the only serious damage sustained was a disabled periscope. U-101 put into Saint Nazaire (also on the French Atlantic coast), on 4 September after 29 days at sea during which she had not been able to sink or damage any ships.

=== Final war patrol ===
U-101’s final patrol took her from Saint Nazaire back to Kiel around the British Isles once more, departing from her French base on 11 October. While outward bound through the Bay of Biscay on 13 October she was attacked at 10:45 by a twin-engine aircraft. Three bombs were dropped. Some damage must have been visible on the surface as she was attacked again while submerged with a further three bombs at 16:42. She carried out an attack on Convoy SC 48 on 18 October, during which she torpedoed and sank the convoy escort HMS Broadwater.

She did not have any further success and arrived in Kiel on 16 November having spent 37 days at sea. This marked the end of her active wartime career. She had sunk 22 merchant ships, totalling 112,618 GRT and a warship of 1,190 tons; she also damaged a further two vessels for a total of 9,113 GRT.

=== As a training boat and fate ===
Oberleutnant zur See (Oblt.z.S.) Karl-Heinz Marbach briefly became commander of U-101 on 1 January 1942, serving as such until 3 February. Oblt.z.S. Friedrich Bothe then took over until 31 March. On 1 March U-101 was part of the 26th Flotilla for crew training, until the end of March. Between 1 April and 31 August, she became a training boat for the 21st U-boat Flotilla. On 1 September she joined the 24th Flotilla, again in a training capacity, terminating these duties on 31 August 1943. Between May 1942 and 25 October 1942 she was commanded by Ernst von Witzendorff. He was replaced by Oblt.z.S. Helmut Münster who commanded U-101 until she was decommissioned. She was moved to the 23rd Flotilla on 1 September 1943 until 22 October 1943.

She was then decommissioned at Neustadt. She was laid up until being scuttled on 3 May 1945 prior to the German surrender. The wreck was later broken up.

=== Wolfpacks ===
U-101 took part in four wolfpacks, namely:

- Rösing (12 – 15 June 1940)
- West (2 – 20 June 1941)
- Grönland (12 – 27 August 1941)
- Reissewolf (21 – 29 October 1941)

== Summary of raiding history ==
Date	Ship	Nationality	Tonnage (Note: Merchant ship tonnages are in gross register tons. Military vessels are listed by tons displacement.)	Fate
26 May 1940	Stanhall	United Kingdom	4,831	Sunk
31 May 1940	Orangemoor	United Kingdom	5,775	Sunk
2 June 1940	Polycarp	United Kingdom	3,577	Sunk
11 June 1940	Mount Hymettus	Greece	5,820	Sunk
12 June 1940	Earlspark	United Kingdom	5,250	Sunk
14 June 1940	Antonis Georgandis	Greece	3,557	Sunk
16 June 1940	Wellington Star	United Kingdom	13,212	Sunk
19 August 1940	Ampleforth	United Kingdom	4,576	Sunk
28 August 1940	Elle	Finland	3,868	Sunk
1 September 1940	Efploia	Greece	3,867	Sunk
12 October 1940	Saint-Malo	Canada	5,779	Sunk
18 October 1940	Blairspey	United Kingdom	4,155	Damaged
18 October 1940	Creekirk	United Kingdom	3,917	Sunk
19 October 1940	Assyrian	United Kingdom	2,962	Sunk
19 October 1940	Soesterberg	Netherlands	1,904	Sunk
30 November 1940	Aracataca	United Kingdom	5,378	Sunk
1 December 1940	Appalachee	United Kingdom	8,826	Sunk
1 December 1940	Loch Ranza	United Kingdom	4,958	Damaged
2 December 1940	Kavak	United Kingdom	2,782	Sunk
2 December 1940	Lady Glanely	United Kingdom	5,497	Sunk
14 February 1941	Belcrest	United Kingdom	4,517	Sunk
17 February 1941	Gairsoppa	United Kingdom	5,237	Sunk
4 June 1941	Trecarrell	United Kingdom	5,271	Sunk
9 June 1941	Trevarrack	United Kingdom	5,270	Sunk
18 October 1941	HMS Broadwater	Royal Navy	1,190	Sunk

== Bibliography ==
- Busch, Rainer; Röll, Hans-Joachim (1999). German U-boat commanders of World War II : a biographical dictionary. Translated by Brooks, Geoffrey. London, Annapolis, Md: Greenhill Books, Naval Institute Press. ISBN 1-55750-186-6.
- Gröner, Erich; Jung, Dieter; Maass, Martin (1991). German Warships 1815–1945, U-boats and Mine Warfare Vessels. Vol. 2. Translated by Thomas, Keith; Magowan, Rachel. London: Conway Maritime Press. ISBN 0-85177-593-4.
