= SS Creekirk =

Cargo steamship sunk during World War II

Coordinates: 57°18′N 11°06′W

History

Romania, Greece, UK
- Name: SS Mariston (1912–13); SS Milcovul (1913–33); SS Hyphaestos (1933–38); SS Creekirk (1938–40)
- Namesake: Milcovul, Romania (1913–33); Hephaestus (Greek god) (1933–38)
- Owner: Romania Prima Societate Naţională de Navigație Maritimă (1913–33); Ant. G. Yannoulatos & Sons (1933–38); Cree SS Co. Ltd. (1938–40)
- Operator: Muir Young Ltd. (1938–40)
- Port of registry: (Romania) Brăila (1913–33); (Greece) Piraeus (1933–38); (United Kingdom) London (1938–40)
- Builder: Robert Duncan & Co, Port Glasgow
- Launched: 21 February 1912
- Completed: May 1912
- Out of service: 18 October 1940
- Identification: Romania (1913–33): official number 549; code letters PHBN; Greece (1933–38): official number 741; Call sign SVKX; UK (1938–40): official number 133032; call sign GJJT
- Fate: torpedoed and sunk

General characteristics
- Type: cargo steamship
- Tonnage: (1938 figures); 3,913 GRT; tonnage under deck 3,537; 2,405 NRT
- Length: 353.3 ft (107.7 m)
- Beam: 51.1 ft (15.6 m)
- Draught: 21 ft 10 in (6.65 m)
- Depth: 23.8 ft (7.3 m)
- Installed power: 338 NHP
- Propulsion: triple-expansion steam engine; single screw
- Speed: 8.5 knots (15.7 km/h)
- Crew: 35 + 1 DEMS gunner
- Sensors & processing systems: direction finding apparatus

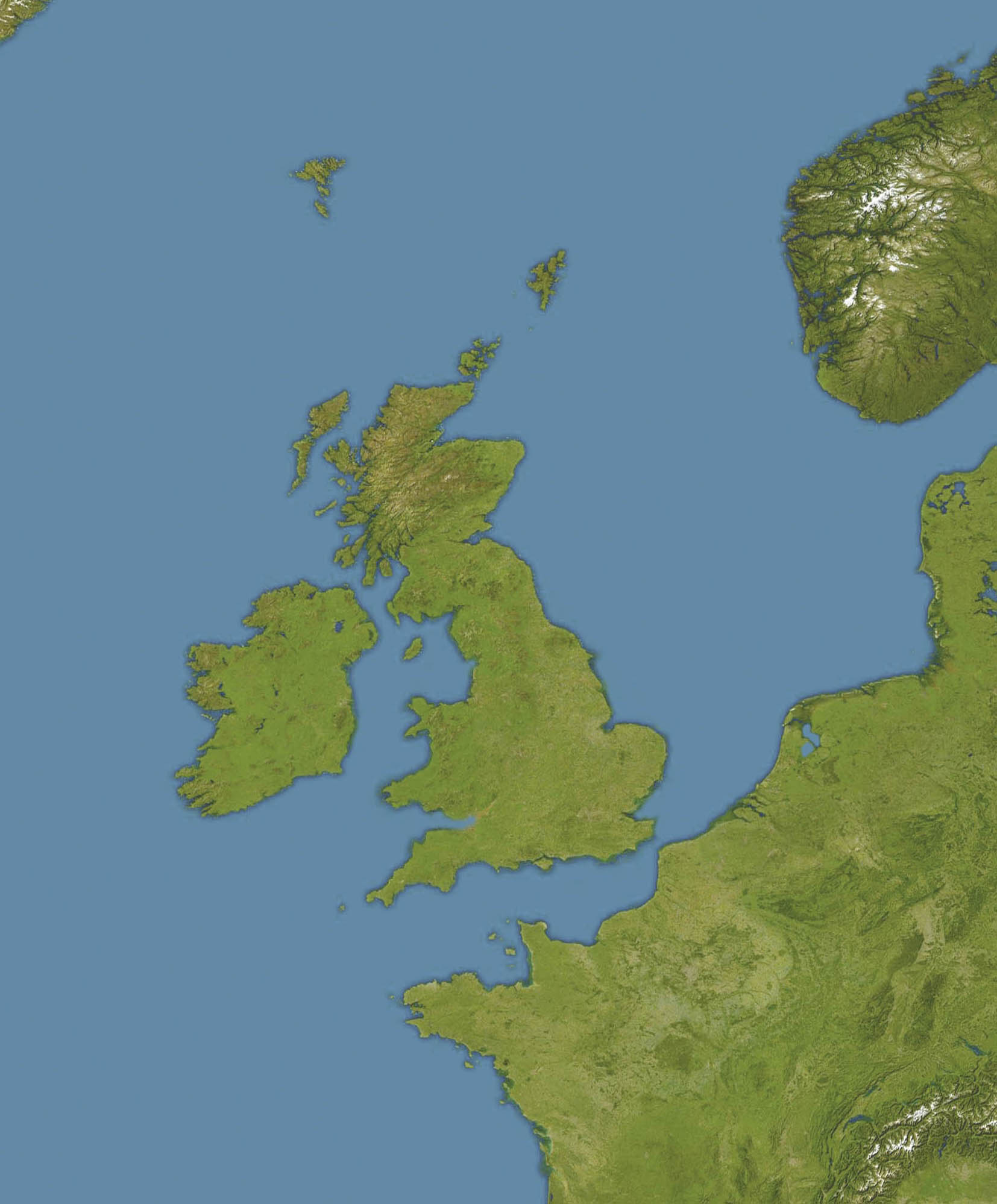
Approximate position of Creekirk's wreck

SS Creekirk was a cargo steamship that was built in Scotland in 1912 and sunk with all hands by a German submarine in 1940. At her launch in 1912 she was named SS Mariston. In her 28-year career she was renamed SS Milcovul in 1913, SS Hyphaestos in 1933 and SS Creekirk in 1938.

== Building and first owner ==
Robert Duncan and Company of Port Glasgow built the ship for W.S. Miller's Ellaston Steam Ship Company of Glasgow and completed her as Mariston in 1912. She had six corrugated furnaces with a combined grate area of 130 square feet (12 m^{2}) that heated two 180 lb_{f}/in^{2} single-ended boilers with a combined heating surface of 5,384 square feet (500 m^{2}). These fed one three-cylinder triple-expansion steam engine built by Rankin and Blackmore of Greenock. Her engine drove a single screw and was rated at 338 NHP.

== Changes of owner and name ==
In 1913 Mariston's owners sold her to Romania Prima Naţională de Navigație Maritimă, who renamed her Milcovul and registered her in Brăila on the River Danube. In August 1916 Romania entered the First World War, and by the end of the year Milcovul had been requisitioned as a transport ship for the Imperial Russian Navy. In 1918 German Empire forces captured her but that November the Central Powers conceded defeat to the Entente Powers and Milcovul's owners recovered her.

Milcovul was in Romania Prima Naţională de Navigație Maritimă's fleet for two decades. When the Russian émigré Alexandre Vlasov took over the company in 1933, Milcovul was sold to Ant. G. Yannoulatos and Sons, who renamed her Hyphaestos and registered her in Piraeus. Yannoulatos ran Hyphaestos for five years and then sold her in 1938 to the Cree Steam Ship Company Ltd of London. Cree renamed the ship Creekirk, registered her in London and appointed Muir, Young Ltd to manage her.

== Convoy SC 7 and loss ==
In autumn 1940 Creekirk loaded 5,900 tons of iron ore at Wabana and Conception Bay in Newfoundland and then sailed to Sydney, Nova Scotia. There she joined Convoy SC 7, which on 5 October sailed for Liverpool. Creekirk was typical of SC 7's 35 merchant ships: old, slow (one source says she could manage only 8.5 knots (15.7 km/h)) and vulnerable. Creekirk had only one DEMS professional military gunner: her armament would have been operated largely by members of her own Merchant Navy crew. At first the convoy had but one escort ship, the Hastings-class sloop HMS Scarborough.

On 16 October a wolf pack of U-boats found SC 7 and quickly overwhelmed its inadequate defences. The attack continued for several days, and on 18 October it intensified as the number of U-boats increased. At 2112 hrs Creekirk was in the Western Approaches northwest of Rockall when Fritz Frauenheim's U-101 torpedoed her. She sank quickly with the loss of all hands: her Master Elie Robilliard, 34 crew and her one DEMS gunner.
