= SS Assyrian =

SS Assyrian may refer to:

- SS Assyrian (1897), a British cargo ship built in 1897 and wrecked in 1901.
- SS Assyrian (1914), a cargo ship built in Germany in 1914, transferred to British owners in 1920 as war reparations and sunk by a German submarine in 1940.
