= Order of the Roman Eagle =

Civil and Military Order of the Roman Eagle
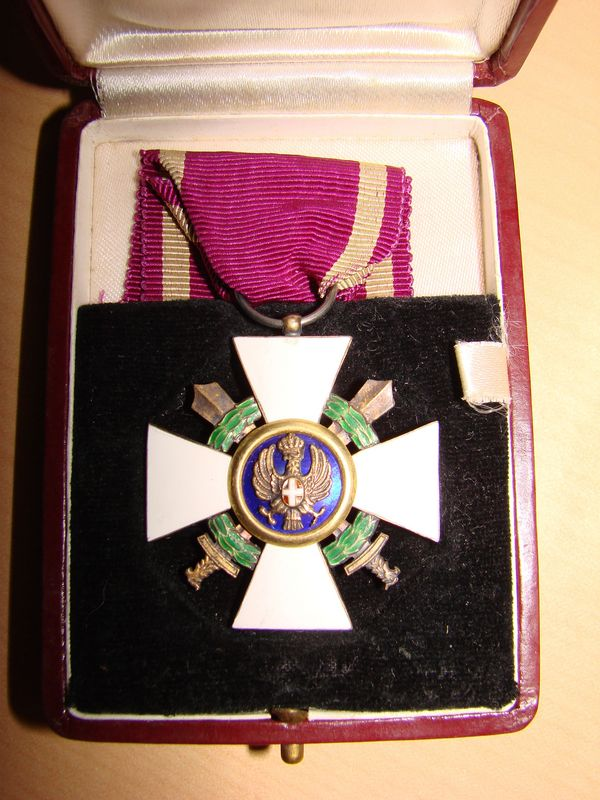
- The insignia of Order of the Roman Eagle
- Presented by: the Kingdom of Italy
- Status: abolished
- Established: 14 March 1942
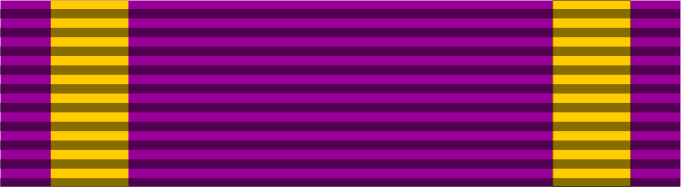
- Ribbon of the order

The Fascist Civil and Military Order of the Roman Eagle founded in 1942 with civil and military divisions, was abolished in Italy in 1944; although it continued to be awarded by Benito Mussolini in the short-lived Italian Social Republic until 1945. A self-styled order of the same name was founded by Romano Mussolini, fourth and youngest son of Benito Mussolini, in 1997.

== Degrees ==
The various degrees of the order, with corresponding ribbons, were as follows:

| Ribbon | Class (English) | Full title in Italian |
|---|---|---|
| | 1st Class / Knight Grand Cross | Cavaliere di Gran Croce dell'Ordine civile e militare dell'Aquila romana |
| | 2nd Class / Grand Officer | Grande Ufficiale dell'Ordine civile e militare dell'Aquila romana |
| | 3rd Class / Commander | Commendatore dell'Ordine civile e militare dell'Aquila romana |
| | 4th Class / Officer | Ufficiale dell'Ordine civile e militare dell'Aquila romana |
| | 5th Class / Knight | Cavaliere dell'Ordine civile e militare dell'Aquila romana |

The separate Order of the Patron Saints of Italy (Ordine dei Santi Patroni d'Italia), St. Francis of Assisi and St. Catherine of Siena, was also conferred by the so-called Republic of Salò between February and April 1945. An organisation of this name was also founded by Romano Mussolini in 1997.

== Recipients ==
- Karl von Eberstein
- Fritz Frauenheim
- Arthur Laumann
- Victor Emmanuel III of Italy

== See also ==
- List of Italian orders of knighthood
- Colonial Order of the Star of Italy
