= SS Snefjeld =

Coordinates: 57°28′N 11°10′W

- Snefjeld in 1912, whilst the Ottoland

History

Norway
- Name: Snefjeld
- Operator: NV Stoomvaart Mij Maasstad (Driebeek & Sons), Rotterdam (1901–1909); Stoomvaart Mij Nederlandsche Lloyd, Rotterdam (1909–1915); Harald Grieg Martens, Bergen (1915–1940)
- Builder: NV Scheepswerf Voorheen Jan Smit Czn, Alblasserdam
- Completed: May 1901
- Renamed: Launched as Maasstad; renamed Ottoland in 1909; renamed Snefjeld in 1915
- Fate: Sunk on 19 October 1940

General characteristics
- Type: Steam merchant ship
- Tonnage: 1,643 GRT
- Crew: 21

SS Snefjeld was a steam merchant ship active from 1909 to 1940, serving in both world wars. The ship served first under Dutch flag, followed by the Norwegian. Snefjeld also sailed under two other names - the Maasstad and the Ottoland - before being finally named the SS Snelfjeld. During her time, she has sailed in numerous Allied convoys, crossing the Atlantic Ocean several times.

The vessel was involved in a brief conflict during World War II, when it rescued several sailors from the sunken SS Thalia. The Thalia was sunken after being attacked by a U-boat. However, after rescuing the sailors, the ship itself was hit by a torpedo, forcing her crew to abandon ship. There were no casualties.

== Construction and early years ==
Snefjeld was completed in May 1901 at the yards of NV Scheepswerf Voorheen Jan Smit Czn, Alblasserdam. She initially entered service with NV Stoomvaart Mij Maasstad (Driebeek & Sons), Rotterdam in 1901 as the Maasstad. She served with them for eight years, being transferred to Stoomvaart Mij Nederlandsche Lloyd, Rotterdam in 1909, when she was renamed Ottoland. She was sold in 1915 to the Norwegian firm of Harald Grieg Martens, Bergen and was renamed Snefjeld.

== Wartime career ==
She sailed in a number of allied convoys after the outbreak of the Second World War, her first being as part of the UK to Norway convoy ON 14 in February 1940. She returned in March with a cargo of pulp. She also made several transatlantic crossings, including with the Halifax, Nova Scotia to UK convoy HX 61, where she transported a cargo of pit props. She appears to have returned to North America in September with convoy OB 207.

=== Convoy SC 7 ===
Snefjeld joined convoy SC 7 for the return voyage to the UK. She arrived at the convoy assembly point at Sydney, Nova Scotia from Caraquet, New Brunswick carrying a cargo of 719 standards of timber and bound for London. The convoy left Sydney on 5 October but later came under attack from several U-boats successfully utilising wolf pack tactics. One of the ships lost was the SS Thalia, a Greek merchant which was torpedoed and sunk on 19 October by U-99. The Snefjeld stopped at 01:15 and lowered three boats to look for survivors from the Thalia. They located four and two boats returned to the Snefjeld and were prepared to be pulled back aboard. At 02:00 U-99 fired a torpedo at the stationary Snefjeld, hitting her on her starboard side near Hatch No. 2.

=== In the lifeboats ===
The second mate, the steward and the mess boy were injured in the explosion, whilst the first mate, who had been in one of the boats was blown into the water. He managed to reboard the Snefjeld but the ship was now ablaze. The Snefjeld listed to starboard sending the deck cargo on the foredeck overboard. The two lifeboats that had been lowered to search for the survivors were destroyed, but the motorboat which had also been launched was able to pick up several of the crew. The rest left the ship in a dinghy. The Snefjeld floated for another hour before breaking in two. She sank at about 08:00. There had been no casualties, and the survivors initially waited in the area in the hope of being spotted. When this did not happen they began to row towards land, but encountered heavy seas. The two boats were separated during the night, but were subsequently able to rejoin the next day. Later that day they came across one of the Thalia's empty lifeboats, and took on its supplies. They then came across another empty life boat from the SS Empire Brigade and transferred some men into it. They then spotted a man on some nearby wreckage. On taking him aboard they found he was a survivor from the SS Fiscus, which had also been lost from the convoy. On 21 October they made contact with a lifeboat containing 29 survivors from the SS Port Gisborne, which had been torpedoed over a week previously. The boats eventually became separated however.

By now the motorboat had been leaking considerably and the men transferred into the lifeboat. They continued rowing east for another day and on 23 October they were picked up by HMS Clematis. The Clematis landed them at Methil on 26 October. The second mate, the steward and the messboy were subsequently hospitalised for a period of time.
