= SS Fiscus =

Coordinates: 57°29′N 11°10′W

History

United Kingdom
- Name: Fiscus
- Owner: Tempus Shipping Co, Ltd
- Operator: W.H. Seager & Co Ltd
- Port of registry: Cardiff
- Builder: Northumberland Shipbuilding Co (1927) Ltd, Howdon, Tyneside
- Yard number: 401
- Launched: 6 Mar 1928
- Completed: Apr 1928
- Out of service: 18 October 1940
- Identification: code letters LBQK (until 1933); Call sign GNTB (1934–40); UK official number: 148298
- Fate: Torpedoed and sunk, 18 October 1940

General characteristics
- Class & type: cargo steamship
- Tonnage: 4,815 GRT; tonnage under deck 4,409; 2,943 NRT
- Length: 399.0 ft (121.6 m) p/p
- Beam: 54.5 ft (16.6 m)
- Draught: 24 ft 9 3/4 in (7.56 m)
- Depth: 25.2 ft (7.7 m)
- Installed power: 432 NHP
- Propulsion: triple-expansion steam engine; single screw
- Speed: 10 knots (19 km/h)
- Crew: 38 + 1 DEMS gunner
- Sensors & processing systems: wireless direction finding (by 1940)

SS Fiscus was a UK cargo steamship that was built in 1928, served in the Second World War and was sunk by a U-boat in 1940.

== Building ==
Northumberland Shipbuilding Co (1927) Ltd of Howdon-on-Tyne built Fiscus, completing her in April 1928. She had nine corrugated furnaces with a combined grate area of 175 square feet (16 m^{2}) that heated three 180 psi (1,200 kPa) single-ended boilers with a combined heating surface of 7,395 square feet (687 m^{2}). The boilers fed a three-cylinder triple expansion steam engine that was rated at 432 nominal horsepower and drove a single screw. The engine was built by the North Eastern Marine Engineering Co, Ltd of Newcastle upon Tyne.

Fiscus was registered in Cardiff, managed by W.H. Seager & Co Ltd and owned by another of William Seager's companies, Tempus Shipping Co, Ltd.

== Wartime career ==
Fiscus was sailing in convoys by May 1940, when she sailed in Convoy OB 152 from Port of Liverpool as far as Canada and then continued unescorted to Charleston, South Carolina. In July 1940 she brought a cargo of scrap iron across the North Atlantic to the United Kingdom via Bermuda, where she joined Convoy BHX 55 and Halifax, Nova Scotia, where BHX 55 joined Convoy HX 55. In September Fiscus again crossed to North America, this time in Convoy OB 208 from Liverpool to Canada.

== Convoy SC 7 and sinking ==
Early in October 1940 Fiscus left Trois-Rivières, Quebec, carrying a cargo of steel, timber and a deck cargo of crated aircraft bound for the River Clyde in Scotland. Her Master was Ebenezer Williams. She went via Sydney, Nova Scotia, where she joined Convoy SC 7 which was bound for Liverpool. SC 7 left Sydney on 5 October. At first the convoy had only one escort ship, the Hastings-class sloop HMS Scarborough. A wolf pack of U-boats found the convoy on 16 October and quickly overwhelmed it, sinking many ships over the next few days.

At 2355 hours on 18 October SC 7 was east of Rockall in the Western Approaches when the German submarine U-99 commanded by Kapitänleutnant Otto Kretschmer torpedoed Fiscus. The steamship sank almost immediately, killing Captain Williams, 36 crew members and one DEMS gunner were lost. One man survived. A lifeboat from the Norwegian cargo steamship SS Snefjeld, which had been sunk earlier by U-99, sighted him standing on some débris and took him aboard. The Flower-class corvette HMS Clematis rescued him and Snefjeld's survivors on 23 October.

Fiscus' fatalities included two of the youngest killed in UK Merchant Navy service in the Second World War. Brothers Kenneth and Raymond Lewis from Wales were 14 and 15 years old respectively. They had joined Fiscus' crew a few months earlier using a forged letter purporting to be from their father giving them permission to go to sea.
