= SS Assyrian (1914) =

Cargo ship sunk during World War II

Coordinates: 57°12′N 10°43′W

History

Germany, UK
- Name: MS Fritz (1914–20); MS Assyrian (1920–25); SS Assyrian (1925–40)
- Owner: Woermann-Linie (1914–20) Ellerman & Papayanni Lines (1920–40)
- Port of registry: (German Empire) Hamburg (1914–20); (United Kingdom) Liverpool (1920–40)
- Builder: Blohm + Voss, Hamburg
- Yard number: 207
- Launched: 24 February 1914
- Completed: August 1914
- Out of service: 19 October 1940
- Identification: UK official number 143952; code letters KDGS (until 1933); Call sign GCVK (1934–40)
- Fate: Sunk by torpedo

General characteristics
- Type: Cargo ship
- Tonnage: 2,962 GRT; tonnage under deck 2,717; 1,761 NRT
- Length: 332.0 feet (101.2 m)
- Beam: 44.8 feet (13.7 m)
- Draught: 22 feet 4 inches (6.81 m)
- Depth: 23.1 feet (7.0 m)
- Installed power: 280 NHP (1925–40)
- Propulsion: twin screws driven by: 2 × marine diesel engines (1914–25); 2 × triple-expansion steam engines (1925–40)
- Speed: 10 knots (19 km/h) full speed
- Crew: 36 (1940)

SS Assyrian was a cargo ship that was built in Hamburg for German owners in 1914, transferred to British owners in 1920 as war reparations and sunk by a U-boat in 1940. She was launched as MS Fritz, and when she changed owners in 1920 she was renamed MS Assyrian. She had been built as a motor ship but in 1925 she was converted to a steamship and became SS Assyrian.

== From MS Fritz to SS Assyrian ==
Blohm + Voss of Hamburg built the ship, completing her as MS Fritz in August 1914 for Woermann-Linie, who registered her in Hamburg. In 1919 she was designated for war reparations and in 1920 she was acquired by the British Ellerman and Papayanni Lines, who renamed her Assyrian and registered her in Liverpool.

In 1925 Ellerman's had her converted from diesel to steam propulsion with a pair of three-cylinder triple-expansion steam engines built by Cooper and Greig of Dundee, Scotland and rated at a combined power output of 280 NHP. Steam came from a pair of 180 lb_{f}/in^{2} single-ended boilers with a combined heating surface of 7,551 square feet (702 m^{2}), heated by a total of six corrugated furnaces with a combined grate area of 134 square feet (12 m^{2}).

== Second World War career ==
Within weeks of the UK entering the Second World War, Assyrian was sailing in convoys, starting with Convoy OA 7 in September 1939 which assembled off the coast of Southend and dispersed in the North Atlantic. Assyrian continued to Gibraltar, where she joined Convoy Green 4. Green 4 was bound for Port Said in Egypt, but Assyrian sailed with it only as far as Malta. From December 1939 until May 1940 she worked between Gibraltar and Liverpool, making outward voyages from Liverpool to Gibraltar in Convoy OG 15 in January and Convoy OG 24 in April.

Assyrian was then transferred to transatlantic convoys between the UK and Canada, starting with Convoy OB 162 from Liverpool in June 1940 and returning the next month in Convoy HX 55 from Halifax, Nova Scotia. In August she went to the US, sailing with Convoy OB 195 from Liverpool until it dispersed at sea.

== Final voyage and sinking ==
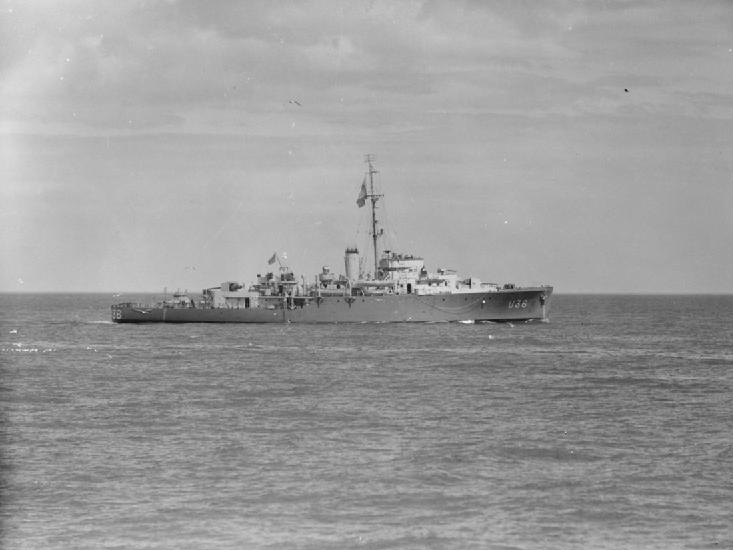
HMS Leith rescued Assyrian's survivors

In September 1940 Assyrian loaded 3,700 tons of grain and sailed from New Orleans to Bermuda, where she joined Convoy BHX 77 to Halifax. There BHX 77 joined Convoy HX 77 to Liverpool, but Assyrian went to Sydney, Nova Scotia where she joined Convoy SC 7, which left for Liverpool on 5 October. Assyrian's Master was Reginald Kearon and she carried the convoy commodore, retired vice admiral Lachlan Mackinnon.

At first the convoy had only one escort ship, the Hastings-class sloop HMS Scarborough. A wolf pack of U-boats found the convoy on 16 October and quickly overwhelmed it, sinking many ships over the next few days. On 19 October, as the convoy was in the Western Approaches, a U-boat was sighted 100 yards ahead of Assyrian. She went full ahead to ram her, making 10 knots (19 km/h) for the first time in her career. She chased the enemy ship for 40 minutes but her main gun was astern and she was unable to bring any of her small guns to bear. The U-boat eventually escaped, leaving Assyrian ahead of the convoy and unescorted.

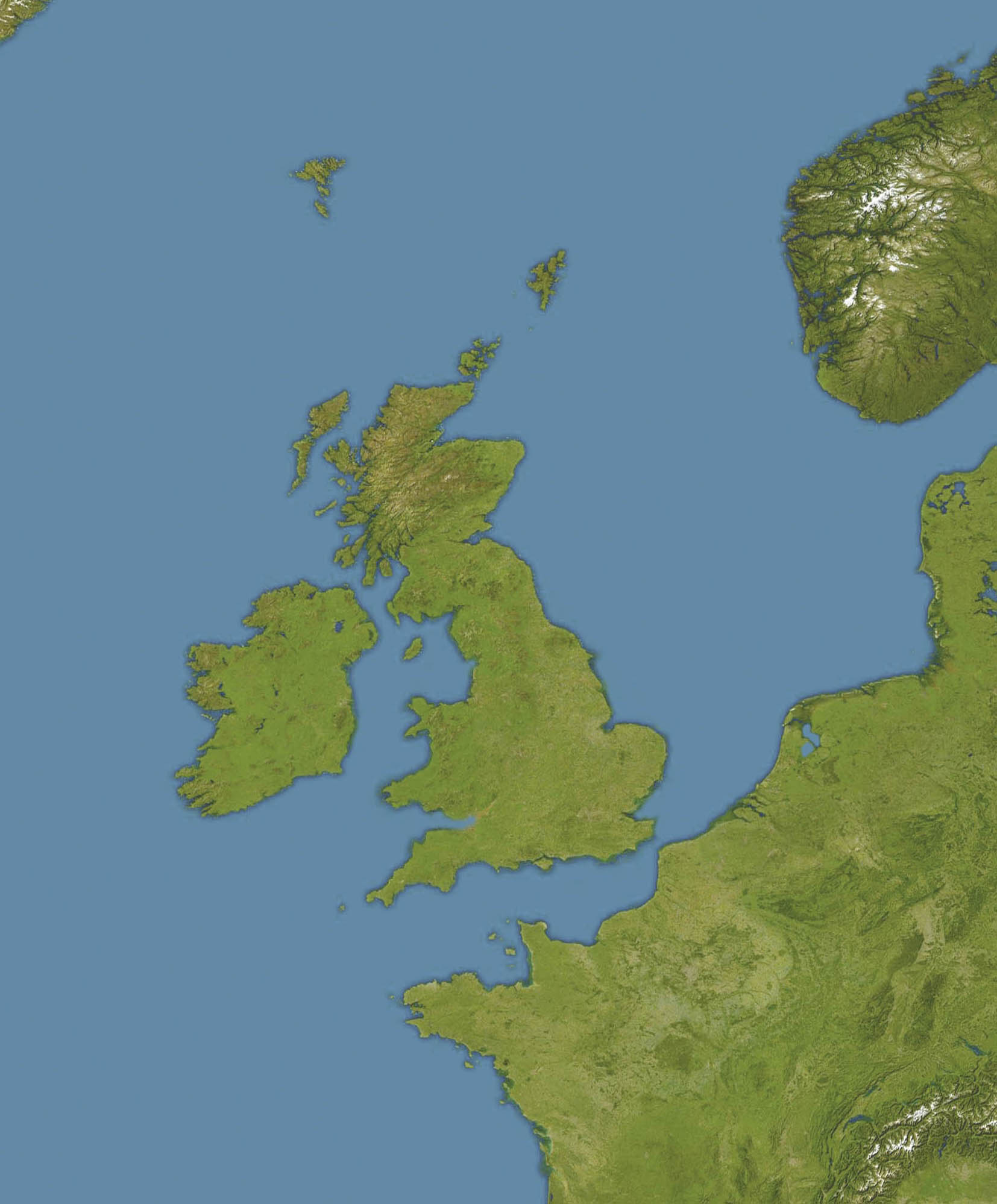
Approximate position of Assyrian's wreck

U-101, commanded by Fritz Frauenheim, sighted Assyrian 102 nautical miles (189 km) west by north of Barra Head, Outer Hebrides. At 0122 hours U-101 fired three bow torpedoes at the convoy, followed two minutes later by a stern torpedo. Frauenheim later reported four hits and four ships sunk.

In fact two of the bow torpedoes missed, but one hit Assyrian on her starboard side, stopping her engines and putting out her lights. U-101's stern torpedo hit the cargo ship Soesterberg. Both of Assyrian's lifeboats were damaged in the explosion and most of the surviving crew took to the life-rafts. A sinking merchant ship drifted down upon Assyrian, her cargo of pit props rolling off and further damaging Assyrian and sinking one of the life-rafts. A small party including Captain Kearon, his Chief Officer and Admiral Mackinnon were stranded aboard the sinking ship. They made a raft from whatever they could find and launched it as Assyrian sank. The raft disintegrated as it hit the water, but most of the occupants managed to cling to pieces of wreckage.

Out of a complement of 51, 17 were killed: 15 crew members and two Royal Navy personnel. The Grimsby-class sloop HMS Leith rescued 34 survivors: her Master, the Commodore, three Royal Navy personnel, 20 crew members and nine passengers and landed them at Liverpool. Captain Kearon was awarded Lloyd's War Medal for Bravery at Sea and the OBE.
