= German submarine U-99 (1940) =

German World War II submarine

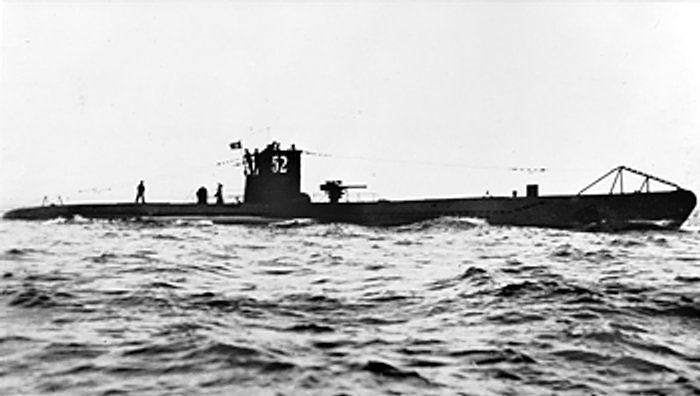
- U-52, a typical Type VIIB boat

History

Nazi Germany
- Name: U-99
- Ordered: 15 December 1937
- Builder: Germaniawerft, Kiel
- Yard number: 593
- Laid down: 31 March 1939
- Launched: 12 March 1940
- Commissioned: 18 April 1940
- Fate: Sunk on 17 March 1941

General characteristics
- Class & type: Type VIIB submarine
- Displacement: 753 tonnes (741 long tons) surfaced; 857 t (843 long tons) submerged
- Length: 66.50 m (218 ft 2 in) o/a; 48.80 m (160 ft 1 in) pressure hull
- Beam: 6.20 m (20 ft 4 in) o/a; 4.70 m (15 ft 5 in) pressure hull
- Height: 9.50 m (31 ft 2 in)
- Draught: 4.74 m (15 ft 7 in)
- Installed power: 2,800–3,200 PS (2,100–2,400 kW; 2,800–3,200 bhp) (diesels); 750 PS (550 kW; 740 shp) (electric)
- Propulsion: 2 shafts; 2 × diesel engines; 2 × electric motors
- Speed: 17.9 knots (33.2 km/h; 20.6 mph) surfaced; 8 knots (15 km/h; 9.2 mph) submerged
- Range: 9,400 nmi (17,400 km; 10,800 mi) at 10 knots (19 km/h; 12 mph) surfaced; 90 nmi (170 km; 100 mi) at 4 knots (7.4 km/h; 4.6 mph) submerged
- Test depth: 220 m (720 ft); Crush depth: 230–250 m (750–820 ft)
- Complement: 4 officers, 40–56 enlisted
- Sensors & processing systems: Gruppenhorchgerät
- Armament: 5 × 53.3 cm (21 in) torpedo tubes (four bow, one stern); 14 × torpedoes or 26 TMA mines; 1 × 8.8 cm (3.46 in) deck gun (220 rounds); 1 × 2 cm (0.79 in) C/30 anti-aircraft gun

Service record
- Part of: 7th U-boat Flotilla; 18 April 1940 – 17 March 1941
- Identification codes: M 17 046
- Commanders: K.Kapt. Otto Kretschmer; 18 April 1940 – 17 March 1941
- Operations: 8 patrols: 1st patrol: 18–25 June 1940; 2nd patrol: 27 June – 21 July 1940; 3rd patrol: 25 July – 5 August 1940; 4th patrol: 4 – 25 September 1940; 5th patrol: 13 – 22 October 1940; 6th patrol: 30 October – 8 November 1940; 7th patrol: 27 November – 12 December 1940; 8th patrol: 22 February – 17 March 1941
- Victories: 35 merchant ships sunk (198,218 GRT); 3 auxiliary warships sunk (46,440 GRT); 5 merchant ships damaged (37,965 GRT); 1 merchant ship taken as prize (2,136 GRT)

German submarine U-99 was a Type VIIB U-boat of Nazi Germany's Kriegsmarine during World War II. She was laid down on 31 March 1939 at the Friedrich Krupp Germaniawerft in Kiel as yard number 593. She was launched on 12 March 1940 under the command of Korvettenkapitän Otto Kretschmer and was assigned to the 7th U-boat Flotilla based in Kiel and later in St Nazaire.

U-99 was one of the most successful German U-boats in the war, sinking 38 ships for a total tonnage of 244,658 gross register tons (GRT) of Allied shipping in eight patrols. She damaged five more ships and took one vessel as a prize. U-99 was sunk on 17 March 1941 by British destroyer HMS Walker while attacking convoy HX 112.

== Design ==
German Type VIIB submarines were preceded by the shorter Type VIIA submarines. U-99 had a displacement of 753 tonnes (741 long tons) when at the surface and 857 tonnes (843 long tons) while submerged. She had a total length of 66.50 m (218 ft 2 in), a pressure hull length of 48.80 m (160 ft 1 in), a beam of 6.20 m (20 ft 4 in), a height of 9.50 m (31 ft 2 in), and a draught of 4.74 m (15 ft 7 in). The submarine was powered by two Germaniawerft F46 four-stroke, six-cylinder supercharged diesel engines producing a total of 2,800 to 3,200 metric horsepower (2,060 to 2,350 kW; 2,760 to 3,160 shp) for use while surfaced, two BBC GG UB 720/8 double-acting electric motors producing a total of 750 metric horsepower (550 kW; 740 shp) for use while submerged. She had two shafts and two 1.23 m (4 ft) propellers. The boat was capable of operating at depths of up to 230 metres (750 ft).

The submarine had a maximum surface speed of 17.9 knots (33.2 km/h; 20.6 mph) and a maximum submerged speed of 8 knots (15 km/h; 9.2 mph). When submerged, the boat could operate for 90 nautical miles (170 km; 100 mi) at 4 knots (7.4 km/h; 4.6 mph); when surfaced, she could travel 8,700 nautical miles (16,100 km; 10,000 mi) at 10 knots (19 km/h; 12 mph). U-99 was fitted with five 53.3 cm (21 in) torpedo tubes (four fitted at the bow and one at the stern), fourteen torpedoes, one 8.8 cm (3.46 in) SK C/35 naval gun, 220 rounds, and one 2 cm (0.79 in) anti-aircraft gun The boat had a complement of between 44 and 60.

== Service history ==
From April to June 1940, the crew of U-99 were under training, based at Kiel and St. Nazaire.

=== First patrol ===
On 18 June, U-99 departed Kiel for operations in the North Sea west of Norway. An Arado Ar-196 seaplane from the German battlecruiser Scharnhorst attacked her, having mistaken her for a British submarine. Two days later, U-99 was attacked by two aircraft; minor damage was inflicted. She returned to Kiel on 25 June.

=== Second patrol ===
U-99 departed Wilhelmshaven on 27 June to patrol southwest of Ireland. On 29 June, she was attacked by British aircraft. A crash dive was carried out with the result that the boat hit the seabed, causing some damage which was able to be repaired. On this patrol U-99 sank six ships and captured one, the Estonian 2,136 GRT cargo steamship Merisaar, carrying a load of timber from New Orleans, to Cork, Ireland. An attack on the 5,360 GRT Manistee was called off on 7 July, when the defensively equipped merchant ship returned fire. On 8 July, over 100 depth charges were dropped by the escorts of Convoy HX 53, but U-99 escaped undamaged. The patrol ended on 21 July.

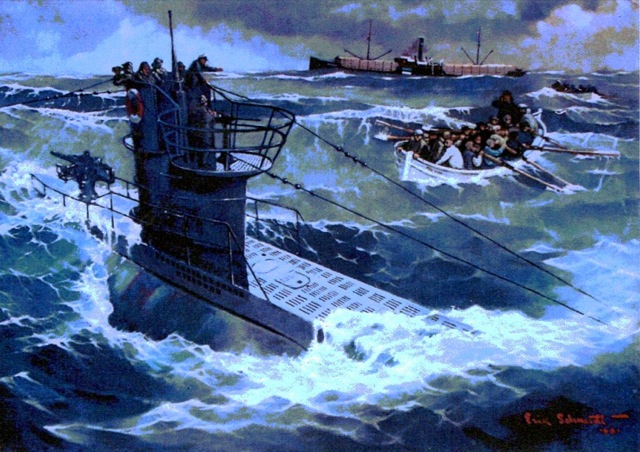
Painting of Merisaar's lifeboat approaching U-99 on 12 July 1940

Date	Ship	Nationality	Tonnage (Note: Merchant ship tonnages are in gross register tons. Military vessels are listed by tons displacement.)	Fate
5 July 1940	Magog ^{†}	Canada	2,053	Sunk
7 July 1940	Bissen	Sweden	1,514	Sunk
7 July 1940	Manistee	United Kingdom	5,360	Escaped
7 July 1940	Sea Glory	United Kingdom	1,964	Sunk
8 July 1940	Humber Arm ^{‡}	United Kingdom	5,758	Sunk
12 July 1940	Ia	Greece	4,860	Sunk
12 July 1940	Merisaar^{*}	Estonia	2,136	Captured as prize
18 July 1940	Woodbury	United Kingdom	4,434	Sunk

† Convoy HX 52, ‡ Convoy HX 53, * sunk by German bombing, 15 July 1940

=== Third patrol ===
On 25 July, U-99 departed Lorient for the North Atlantic. Four ships were sunk and three others damaged. On the 31st, the escorts of Convoy OB 191 dropped 20 depth charges on the boat without effect. Later that evening, a flying boat also attacked her, again without causing any damage. The patrol ended on 5 August.

Date	Ship	Nationality	Tonnage (GRT)	Fate
28 July 1940	Auckland Star	United Kingdom	13,212	Sunk
29 July 1940	Clan Menzies	United Kingdom	7,336	Sunk
31 July 1940	Jamaica Progress	United Kingdom	5,475	Sunk
31 July 1940	Jersey City ^{†}	United Kingdom	6,322	Sunk
2 August 1940	Alexia ^{†, ‡}	United Kingdom	8,016	Damaged
2 August 1940	Lucerna ^{†, ‡}	United Kingdom	6,556	Damaged
2 August 1940	Strinda ^{†, ‡}	Norway	10,973	Damaged

† Convoy OB 191, ‡ Damaged

=== Fourth patrol ===
U-99 departed Lorient on 4 September for the North Atlantic; seven ships were sunk. The patrol ended on the 25th. U-99 was slightly damaged in an air raid on Lorient on 27 September.

Date	Ship	Nationality	Tonnage (GRT)	Fate
11 September 1940	Albionic	United Kingdom	2,468	Sunk
15 September 1940	Kenordoc ^{†}	Canada	1,780	Sunk
16 September 1940	Lotos ^{†}	Norway	1,327	Sunk
17 September 1940	Crown Arun ^{‡}	United Kingdom	2,372	Sunk
21 September 1940	Baron Blythswood ^{*}	United Kingdom	3,668	Sunk
21 September 1940	Elmbank ^{*}	United Kingdom	5,156	Sunk
21 September 1940	Invershannon^{*}	United Kingdom	9,154	Sunk

† Convoy SC 3, ‡ Convoy HX 71, * Convoy HX 72

=== Fifth patrol ===
On 13 October, U-99 departed Lorient to patrol the North West Approaches. Six ships from Convoy SC 7 were sunk and another was damaged. The patrol ended on 22 October.

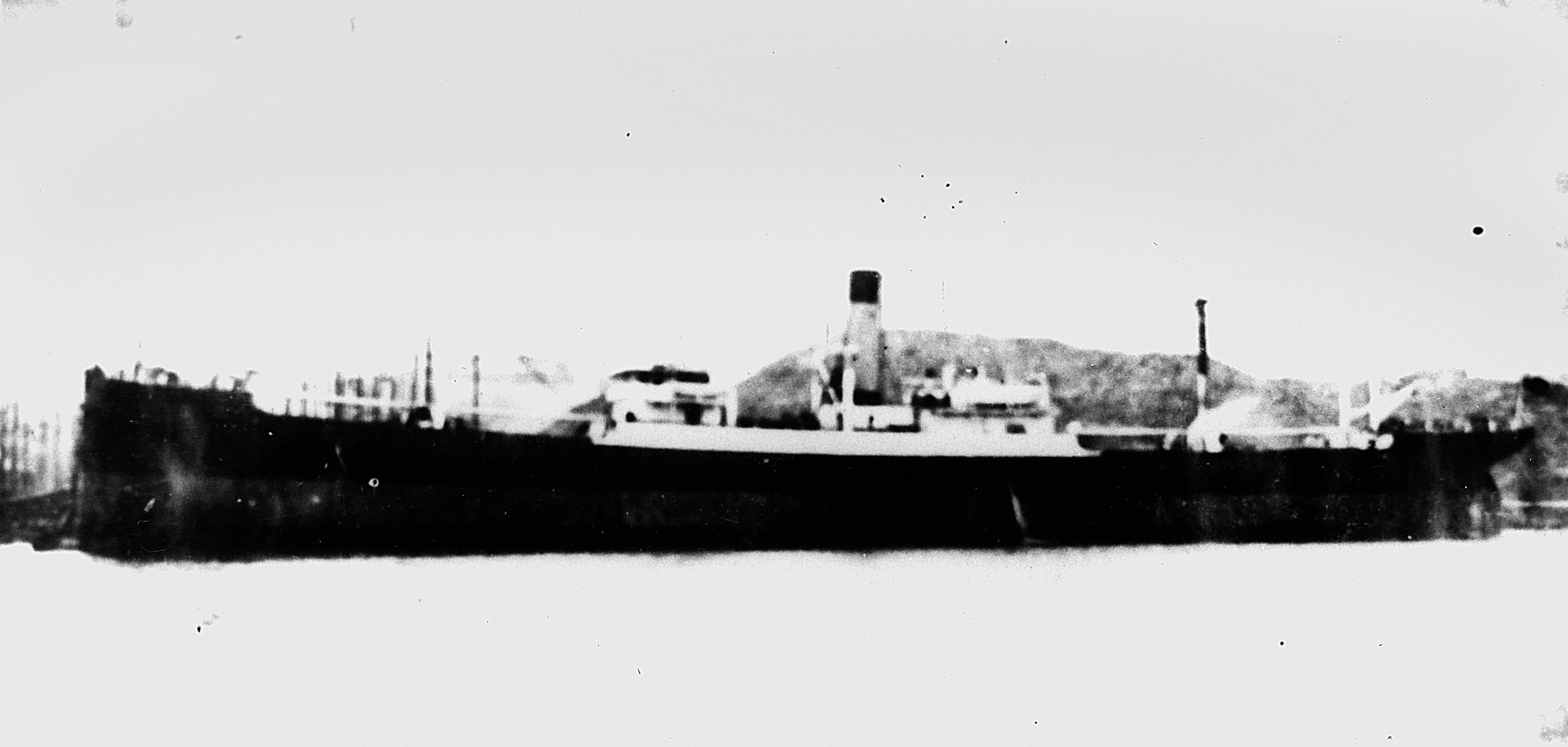
Empire Brigade

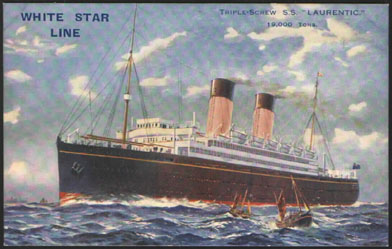
Postcard of Laurentic

Date	Ship	Nationality	Tonnage (GRT)	Fate
18 October 1940	Empire Miniver	United Kingdom	6,055	Sunk
18 October 1940	Fiscus	United Kingdom	4,815	Sunk
18 October 1940	Niritos	Greece	3,854	Sunk
19 October 1940	Clintonia ^{†}	United Kingdom	3,106	Damaged
19 October 1940	Empire Brigade	United Kingdom	5,154	Sunk
19 October 1940	Snefjeld	Norway	1,643	Sunk
19 October 1940	Thalia	Greece	5,875	Sunk

=== Sixth patrol ===
U-99 departed Lorient for the North West Approaches on 30 October 1940; four ships were sunk. The patrol ended on 8 November.

Date	Ship	Nationality	Tonnage (GRT)	Fate
3 November 1940	Casanare	United Kingdom	5,376	Sunk
3 November 1940	HMS Laurentic	Royal Navy	18,724	Sunk
4 November 1940	HMS Patroclus	Royal Navy	11,314	Sunk
5 November 1940	Scottish Maiden ^{†}	United Kingdom	6,993	Sunk

† Convoy HX 83

=== Seventh patrol ===
On 27 November, U-99 departed Lorient for the North Atlantic. Four ships were sunk. The patrol ended on 12 December.

Date	Ship	Nationality	Tonnage (GRT)	Fate
2 December 1940	HMS Forfar	Royal Navy	16,402	Sunk
2 December 1940	Samnanger	Norway	4,276	Sunk
3 December 1940	Conch ^{†}	United Kingdom	8,376	Sunk
7 December 1940	Farmsum ^{‡}	Netherlands	5,237	Sunk

† Convoy HX 90, ‡ Convoy OB 252

=== Eighth patrol ===
U-99 departed Lorient on 22 February 1941 to patrol in the North Atlantic; eight ships were sunk. U-99 was attacked herself, with severe damage inflicted. Kretschmer surrendered and scuttled the submarine with the loss of three lives.

Date	Ship	Nationality	Tonnage (GRT)	Fate
7 March 1941	Athelbeach ^{†}	United Kingdom	6,568	Sunk
7 March 1941	Terje Viken	United Kingdom	20,638	Sunk
16 March 1941	Beduin ^{‡}	Norway	8,136	Sunk
16 March 1941	Ferm ^{‡}	Norway	6,593	Sunk
16 March 1941	Franche-Comté ^{‡}	United Kingdom	9,314	Damaged
16 March 1941	J. B. White	Canada	7,375	Sunk
16 March 1941	Korshamn ^{‡}	Sweden	6,673	Sunk
16 March 1941	Venetia ^{†}	United Kingdom	5,728	Sunk

† Convoy OB 293, ‡ Convoy HX 112

== Fate ==
On 17 March 1941, U-99 had just fired the last of her torpedoes and sunk Korshamn when the Watch Officer spotted a destroyer, southeast of Iceland in approximate position 61°N 12°W. He immediately ordered a dive, contrary to Kretschmer's standing orders, but once the boat was under it was quickly fixed on ASDIC and attacked by HMS Walker and Vanoc. U-99 was driven deep by the attack but was nonetheless severely damaged. Kretschmer had no choice but to surface; immediately a barrage of fire greeted the boat. Kretschmer sent a message to Donald Macintyre, Walker's captain, "CAPTAIN TO CAPTAIN. I AM SUNKING [sic] PLEASE RESCUE MY CREW." He then ordered that the boat should be scuttled. Forty crew, including Kretschmer, were rescued to become POWs. Three crewmen – the engineering-officer and two ratings – lost their lives. The engineering officer re-entered the sinking U-boat and perished while opening the galley hatch, to hasten the boat's sinking and prevent the British from boarding it.

Macintyre took Kretschmer's binoculars as a souvenir. However in 1955, he gave them back to Kretschmer.

== Wolfpack operations ==
U-99 operated with the following Wolfpacks during her career:

- Wolfpack 1 (20 – 22 September 1940)
- Wolfpack 2 (17 – 19 October 1940)

== Summary of raiding history ==
Date	Name	Nationality	Tonnage	Fate
5 July 1940	Magog	Canada	2,053	Sunk
7 July 1940	Sea Glory	United Kingdom	1,964	Sunk
7 July 1940	Bissen	Sweden	1,514	Sunk
8 July 1940	Humber Arm	United Kingdom	5,758	Sunk
12 July 1940	Ia	Greece	4,860	Sunk
12 July 1940	Merisaar	Estonia	2,136	Captured as prize
18 July 1940	Woodbury	United Kingdom	4,434	Sunk
28 July 1940	Auckland Star	United Kingdom	13,212	Sunk
29 July 1940	Clan Menzies	United Kingdom	7,336	Sunk
31 July 1940	Jamaica Progress	United Kingdom	5,475	Sunk
31 July 1940	Jersey City	United Kingdom	6,322	Sunk
2 August 1940	Strinda	Norway	10,973	Damaged
2 August 1940	Lucerna	United Kingdom	6,556	Damaged
2 August 1940	Alexia	United Kingdom	8,016	Damaged
11 September 1940	Albionic	United Kingdom	2,468	Sunk
15 September 1940	Kenordoc	Canada	1,780	Sunk
16 September 1940	Lotos	Norway	1,327	Sunk
17 September 1940	Crown Arun	United Kingdom	2,372	Sunk
21 September 1940	Invershannon	United Kingdom	9,154	Sunk
21 September 1940	Baron Blythswood	United Kingdom	3,668	Sunk
21 September 1940	Elmbank	United Kingdom	5,156	Sunk
18 October 1940	Empire Miniver	United Kingdom	6,055	Sunk
18 October 1940	Niritos	Greece	3,854	Sunk
18 October 1940	Fiscus	United Kingdom	4,815	Sunk
19 October 1940	Empire Brigade	United Kingdom	5,154	Sunk
19 October 1940	Thalia	Greece	5,875	Sunk
19 October 1940	Snefjeld	Norway	1,643	Sunk
19 October 1940	Clintonia	United Kingdom	3,106	Damaged
3 November 1940	Casanare	United Kingdom	5,376	Sunk
3 November 1940	HMS Laurentic	Royal Navy	18,724	Sunk
4 November 1940	HMS Patroclus	Royal Navy	11,314	Sunk
5 November 1940	Scottish Maiden	United Kingdom	6,993	Sunk
2 December 1940	HMS Forfar	Royal Navy	16,402	Sunk
2 December 1940	Samnanger	Norway	4,276	Sunk
3 December 1940	Conch	United Kingdom	8,376	Sunk
7 December 1940	Farmsum	Netherlands	5,237	Sunk
7 March 1941	Terje Viken	United Kingdom	20,638	Sunk
7 March 1941	Athelbeach	United Kingdom	6,568	Sunk
16 March 1941	Beduin	Norway	8,136	Sunk
16 March 1941	Franche-Comté	United Kingdom	9,314	Damaged
16 March 1941	J. B. White	Canada	7,375	Sunk
16 March 1941	Korshamn	Sweden	6,673	Sunk
16 March 1941	Venetia	United Kingdom	5,728	Sunk
16 March 1941	Ferm	Norway	6,593	Sunk

== See also ==
- List of successful U-boats
- Operation Kiebitz

== Bibliography ==
- Busch, Rainer; Röll, Hans-Joachim (1999). German U-boat commanders of World War II : a biographical dictionary. Translated by Brooks, Geoffrey. London, Annapolis, Md: Greenhill Books, Naval Institute Press. ISBN 1-55750-186-6.
- Busch, Rainer; Röll, Hans-Joachim (1999). Deutsche U-Boot-Verluste von September 1939 bis Mai 1945 [German U-boat losses from September 1939 to May 1945]. Der U-Boot-Krieg (in German). Vol. IV. Hamburg, Berlin, Bonn: Mittler. ISBN 3-8132-0514-2.
- Edwards, Bernard (1996). Dönitz and the Wolf Packs – The U-boats at War. Cassell Military Classics. pp. 23, 27, 28, 32, 35, 42–44, 48–49. ISBN 0-304-35203-9.
- Gröner, Erich; Jung, Dieter; Maass, Martin (1991). German Warships 1815–1945, U-boats and Mine Warfare Vessels. Vol. 2. Translated by Thomas, Keith; Magowan, Rachel. London: Conway Maritime Press. ISBN 0-85177-593-4.
- Kemp, Paul (1997). U-Boats Destroyed, German Submarine Losses in the World Wars. Arms and Armour. ISBN 1-85409-515-3.
- Niestle, Axel (1998). German U-Boat Losses during World War II. Greenhill Books. ISBN 1-85367-352-8.
- Sharpe, Peter (1998). U-Boat Fact File. Great Britain: Midland Publishing. ISBN 1-85780-072-9.
- White, David Fairbank (2006). Bitter Ocean – The dramatic story of the Battle of the Atlantic 1939–1945. Headline Publishing Group. ISBN 978-0-7553-1089-0.
