= Fritz Frauenheim =

German U-boat commander

- Born: 9 March 1912; Berlin-Friedenau, German Empire
- Died: 28 September 1969 (aged 57); Hamburg, West Germany
- Military career
- Allegiance: Weimar Republic (to 1933); Nazi Germany
- Branch: Reichsmarine; Kriegsmarine
- Service years: 1930–45
- Rank: Fregattenkapitän
- Units: 2nd U-boat Flotilla; 1st U-boat Flotilla; 7th U-boat Flotilla; 23rd U-boat Flotilla; 29th U-boat Flotilla
- Commands: U-21, 1 October 1937 - 6 January 1940; U-101, 11 March 1940 - 18 November 1940
- Awards: Spanish Cross; Knight's Cross of the Iron Cross; Order of the Roman Eagle
- Other work: Oil industry

Fritz Frauenheim (9 January 1912 – 28 September 1969) was a German U-boat commander of the Second World War. From September 1939 until retiring from front line service in December 1940, he sank 19 ships for a total of 78,853 gross register tons (GRT), and damaged two others. He was a recipient of the Knight's Cross of the Iron Cross of Nazi Germany.

== Early life ==
Frauenheim was born in Berlin-Friedenau on 9 March 1912. He entered the navy and spent his initial training on the cadet ship Schleswig-Holstein, followed by a period on the light cruiser Karlsruhe. He was transferred to the U-boat force in January 1936 and rose quickly through the ranks and on 1 April 1939 he was promoted to Kapitänleutnant. He appears to have spent time with the German forces supporting the Spanish Nationalist forces during the Spanish Civil War, as he was awarded the Spanish Cross on 6 June 1939.

== Wartime career ==
Frauenheim had been made watch officer on U-25 in 1938, eventually spending over a year in this role, until October 1939. He was appointed to command U-21 on 1 October 1937, eventually carrying out five patrols, eventually sinking four merchant ships. He also laid mines, one of which damaged HMS Belfast on 21 November, putting her out of action for nearly three years. The Net-class boom defence vessel Bayonet was sunk by one of U-21’s mines on 21 December.

Frauenheim left U-21 on 6 January 1940, taking over command of the newly built U-101 on 11 March 1940. He commissioned the boat and took her on four successful patrols. He sank a total of 12 ships, including three sunk and one damaged from convoy SC 7. He left U-101 on 18 November 1940 and became a teacher in the 2nd ULD. He went on to hold a number of staff positions, before taking command of 23rd U-boat Flotilla in the Mediterranean in September 1941. In 1942 he moved to command 29th U-boat Flotilla. On 1 March 1943 he was promoted to Korvettenkapitän. In February 1944 Frauenheim joined the staff of the Admiral der Kleinkampfverbände (Admiral of Small Battle Units), where he remained for the rest of the war. He was again promoted, this time to Fregattenkapitän on 1 December 1944.

== Post war ==
After the end of the war Frauenheim spent eight months in Allied captivity before being released. For almost 20 years until his death, Frauenheim worked at the Mobil Oil AG in the Federal Republic of Germany. His last position was as a member of the board and head of the department of Marine Transportation and Pipelines. He died in Hamburg on 28 September 1969, aged 57.

== Awards ==
- Wehrmacht Long Service Award 4th Class (2 October 1936)
- Spanish Cross in Bronze (6 June 1939)
- Iron Cross (1939)
  - 2nd Class (2 October 1939)
  - 1st Class (7 November 1939)
- Sudetenland Medal (20 December 1938)
- Knight's Cross of the Iron Cross on 29 August 1940 as Kapitänleutnant and commander of U-101
- Knight's Cross of the Order of the Roman Eagle with Swords (18 June 1943)
- German Cross in Gold on 23 November 1944 as Korvettenkapitän with the Admiral of the Kleinkampfverbände

== Promotions ==
10 October 1930:	Seekadett (Midshipman)
1 January 1932:	Fähnrich zur See (Officer Cadet)
1 April 1934:	Oberfähnrich zur See (Senior Ensign)
1 October 1934:	Leutnant zur See (Second Lieutenant)
1 June 1936:	Oberleutnant zur See (First Lieutenant)
1 April 1939:	Kapitänleutnant (Captain Lieutenant)
1 March 1943:	Korvettenkapitän (Corvette Captain), effective as of 1 March 1943 with rank age dated 1 April 1943
1 December 1944:	Fregattenkapitän (Frigate Captain)

Military offices
Preceded by Kapitänleutnant Werner Jacobsen	Commander of the 4th U-boat Flotilla; July 1942	Succeeded by Fregattenkapitän Heinz Fischer
Preceded by Korvettenkapitän Franz Becker	Commander of the 29th U-boat Flotilla; May 1942 – July 1943	Succeeded by Korvettenkapitän Gunter Jahn
