= SS Empire Brigade =

UK cargo steamship, involved in both World Wars

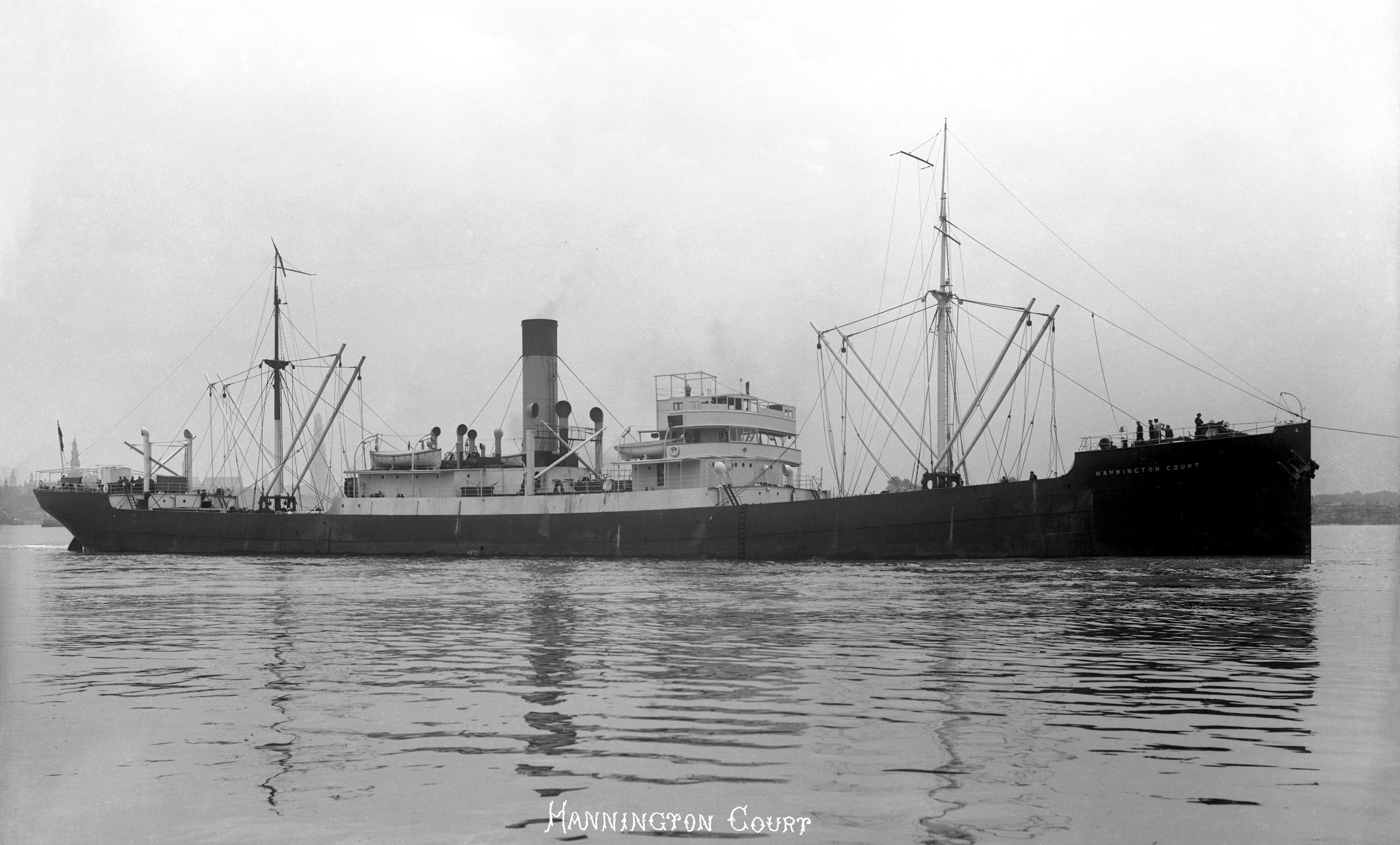
- Hannington Court in Antwerp

History
- Name: 1912: Hannington Court; 1936: Elios; 1940: Empire Brigade
- Owner: 1912: Court Line; 1936: United British SS Co; 1936: Achille Lauro; 1940: Ministry of War Transport
- Operator: 1912: Haldinstein & Co; 1915: Haldin & Co; 1929: Haldin & Philipps; 1936: Achille Lauro; 1940: Cairns, Noble & Co Ltd
- Port of registry: 1912: (United Kingdom of Great Britain and Ireland) London; 1936: (Italy) Naples; 1940: (United Kingdom) Newcastle-upon-Tyne
- Builder: John Priestman & Co, Sunderland
- Yard number: 239
- Launched: 10 October 1912
- Completed: November 1912
- Identification: UK official number 135157; 1912: code letters JBDQ; 1930: call sign GRSZ; 1936: Italian official number 462; 1936: call sign IBFO; 1940: call sign GLZS
- Fate: sunk by torpedo, October 1940

General characteristics
- Type: cargo steamship
- Tonnage: 5,166 GRT, 3,217 NRT
- Length: 400.0 ft (121.9 m)
- Beam: 53.5 ft (16.3 m)
- Draught: 23 ft 9 in (7.24 m)
- Depth: 26.6 ft (8.1 m)
- Decks: 1
- Installed power: triple-expansion engine; 440 NHP
- Propulsion: 1 × screw
- Speed: 10 knots (19 km/h)
- Crew: 41

SS Empire Brigade was a cargo steamship. She was built for Court Line in 1912 as Hannington Court. In 1936, Achille Lauro bought her and renamed her Elios. In 1940, the United Kingdom seized her as a war prize; and the Ministry of War Transport (MoWT) took her over. She became an Empire ship, with the name Empire Brigade. Four months later, a German U-boat sank her by torpedo, killing six members of her crew.

She was the first of three Court Line ships that were called Hannington Court. All three were built at shipyards in Sunderland. The second was a motor ship that was built in 1939, and caught fire and sank in 1941. The third was a motor ship that was built in 1954; sold in 1963 and renamed; and scrapped in 1976.

== Building ==
Sir John Priestman & Co Ltd in Southwick, Sunderland built the ship for Philip Haldinstein as yard number 239. She was launched on 10 October 1912, and completed that November. She was the eighth new ship that Haldinstein had bought from English shipyards since he founded Court Line in 1905. She was also the largest Court Line ship to date, and the only one built by Priestman.

The ship's registered length was 400.0 ft (121.9 m); her beam was 53.5 ft (16.3 m); her depth was 26.6 ft (8.1 m); and her draught was 23 ft 9 in (7.24 m). Her tonnages were 5,166 GRT, 3,217 NRT. She had a single screw, driven by a three-cylinder triple-expansion steam engine built by Blair and Co Ltd of Stockton-on-Tees. The engine was rated at 440 NHP, and gave her a speed of 10 knots (19 km/h).

== Hannington Court and Elios ==
Haldinstein registered Hannington Court in London. Her UK official number was 135157, and her code letters were JBDQ. By 1930 her wireless telegraph call sign was GRSZ, and by 1934 this had superseded her code letters.

In 1915, Haldinstein shortened his name to Haldin, and his company became Haldin & Co. In 1929, Richard Philipps became a partner with Haldin, and the company was renamed Haldin & Philipps. In 1936, Haldinstein set up a new company, the United British Steamship Co. Hannington Court belonged to the new company only briefly, before Haldin sold her.

In the course of 1936, Achille Lauro bought Hannington Court; renamed her Elios; and added her to his Flota Lauro. She was registered in Naples; her Italian official number was 462; and her call sign was IBFO.

On 10 June 1940 Italy declared war on France and the UK and invaded France. Elios was in port in Newcastle, where the UK authorities seized her as a war prize. The Ministry of War Transport renamed her Empire Brigade; registered her in Newcastle; and appointed Cairns, Noble & Co Ltd to manage her. Her new call sign was GLSZ.

== Empire Brigade ==
On 8 August 1940, Empire Brigade left the River Tyne and joined convoy FN 245, which had assembled in the Thames Estuary off Southend-on-Sea, and was bound for the Firth of Forth off Methil. On 11 August she left Methil with convoy OA 197, but for some reason returned to port. On 31 August she left again, this time with convoy OA 207, which dispersed at sea.

In October 1940 Empire Brigade loaded a cargo of 750 tons of copper, 129 tons of ferrous alloys and 980 tons of steel at Montreal in Canada and then sailed to Sydney, Nova Scotia where she joined Convoy SC 7 which was bound for Liverpool. Empire Brigade's cargo was bound for Leith via the Tyne. Her Master was Captain Sydney Parks, and she carried 40 crew, including her DEMS gunners.

Approximate position of Empire Brigade's wreck

The convoy left Sydney on 5 October 1940; at first with only one escort ship; the Hastings-class sloop HMS Scarborough. A wolf pack of U-boats found the convoy on 16 October and quickly overwhelmed it, sinking many ships over the next few days. Empire Brigade survived until 0138 hrs on 19 October, when U-99 torpedoed and sank her in the Western Approaches about 100 nautical miles (190 km) east-southeast of Rockall, at position 57°12′N 10°43′W. One DEMS gunner and five other crew members were killed. The Shoreham-class sloop HMS Fowey rescued Captain Parks and 34 of his crew, and landed them at Greenock.

== Bibliography ==
- Lloyd's Register of Shipping. Vol. I.–Steamers. London: Lloyd's Register of Shipping. 1914 – via Internet Archive.
- Lloyd's Register of Shipping. Vol. I.–Sailing Vessels, Owners, &c. London: Lloyd's Register of Shipping. 1915 – via Internet Archive.
- Lloyd's Register of Shipping (PDF). Vol. II.–Steamers and Motorships of 300 tons gross and over. London: Lloyd's Register of Shipping. 1934 – via Southampton City Council.
- Lloyd's Register of Shipping (PDF). Vol. II.–Steamers and Motorships of 300 tons gross and over. London: Lloyd's Register of Shipping. 1938 – via Southampton City Council.
- Lloyd's Register of Shipping (PDF). Vol. II.–Steamers and Motorships of 300 tons. Trawlers, tugs, dredgers, &c. London: Lloyd's Register of Shipping. 1940 – via Southampton City Council.
- Registrar General of Shipping and Seamen (1930). Mercantile Navy List. London: Board of Trade – via Crew List Index Project.
