= Grimsby (disambiguation) =

Grimsby is a UK seaport on the Humber Estuary in North East Lincolnshire.

Grimsby may also refer to:

== Places ==
- Grimsby, Illinois, an unincorporated community in the United States
- Grimsby, Ontario, a town in Ontario, Canada
- Little Grimsby, village near Louth, Lincolnshire, England, part of Brackenborough with Little Grimsby parish
- Great Grimsby (UK Parliament constituency), a United Kingdom parliamentary constituency
- New Grimsby and Old Grimsby, villages on the island of Tresco in the Isles of Scilly, England

== Sport ==
- Grimsby Town F.C., a Football League club
- Grimsby Borough F.C., a Central Midlands Football League club

== Military ==
- Grimsby Chums, a British First World War Pals battalion
- RAF Grimsby, a World War II Royal Air Force station
- Grimsby-class sloop, a World War II class of warships
  - HMS Grimsby, ships of the Royal Navy named after the city

== Other uses ==
- "Grimsby" (song), a song by Elton John from his 1974 album Caribou
- Grimsby (film), a 2016 action-comedy film starring Sacha Baron Cohen
- Roger Grimsby (1928–1995), a former American news anchor and actor
- Grimsby, a character from the 1970 Rankin/Bass Christmas special Santa Claus Is Coming to Town
- Grimsby, a character from Disney's 1989 animated film The Little Mermaid

== See also ==
- Grimsay (disambiguation)
