= Philip King Enright =

Royal Navy Admiral (1894–1960)

Admiral Sir Philip King Enright KBE CB
- Born: 4 August 1894; Liskeard, Cornwall
- Died: 28 September 1960 (aged 66); Exmouth, Devon
- Military career
- Allegiance: United Kingdom
- Branch: Royal Navy
- Service years: 1910–1953
- Rank: Admiral
- Commands: HMS Grimsby; HMS Cardiff; HMS Cumberland
- Conflicts: World War II
- Awards: Order of the British Empire; Order of the Bath

Admiral Sir Philip King Enright KBE CB (4 August 1894 – 29 September 1960) was a Royal Navy officer who saw active service during the Second World War. He was the first person to reach the rank of full admiral from the lower deck in the history of the Royal Navy.

== Biography ==
Enright was born in Liskeard, Cornwall, the son John and Bridget E. Enright, and received his schooling at the Royal Hospital School, Greenwich, before joining the Navy aged 15 as a Boy, 2nd Class on 19 April 1910 at HMS Ganges, a naval training school based at Shotley, near Ipswich in Suffolk. He later attended the Royal Naval College, Greenwich. Admiral Enright was in fact the first person in the history of the Royal Navy to be promoted from the lower deck (non-commissioned ranks) to become a full admiral. In 1953 he was the honored guest at his old School (RHS) on Speech Day and took the salute at the Speech Day march past of the entire school.

Promoted to lieutenant on 19 May 1922 (with seniority backdated to 28 June 1919), Enright served aboard Vulcan, a submarine depot ship based at Portland, between 1923 and 1925. He then served aboard the cruiser Caradoc in the Mediterranean Fleet in 1925–26. In 1927 he was aboard the destroyer flotilla leader Keppel on the China Station, receiving promotion to lieutenant commander on 28 June of that year, and from 1928 until 1931 was on the battleship Nelson of the Atlantic Fleet, being promoted again, to commander, on 31 December 1931. He spent most of 1932 serving as executive officer of the light cruiser Coventry in the Mediterranean.

From March 1934 to February 1936 Enright was executive officer at the naval training school HMS Ganges, then from May 1936 to July 1937 was Naval Officer-in-Charge at Aden, receiving promotion to captain on 30 June 1937. Between the end of 1937 and 1939 he was commander of the sloop Grimsby on the China Station, then served as both commander of the light cruiser Cardiff and as flag captain to the vice admiral commanding the Reserve Fleet Destroyer Flotillas from July 1939 until February 1941.

From August 1942 into 1943 he served as Captain of the Fleet, Mediterranean Fleet, then from February 1943 until the end of the year on the Staff of the Commander-in-Chief, Levant, based at Alexandria. From July 1944 until April 1946 he commanded the heavy cruiser Cumberland in the Eastern Fleet.

From July 1946 until January 1947 he served as naval aide-de-camp to King George VI, receiving promotion to rear admiral on 8 January 1947. In 1947-48 he was flag officer of the Training Squadron. Promoted to vice admiral on 1 May 1950, he served as admiral superintendent of the Devonport Dockyard until May 1953.

Enright retired from the Navy on 15 September 1953, receiving promotion to admiral that day.

Admiral Enright died at Exmouth, Devon, on 29 September 1960.

== Awards ==
Enright was made a Commander of the Order of the British Empire (CBE) on 11 June 1946, a Companion of the Order of the Bath (CB) on 1 January 1949, and Knight Commander of the Order of the British Empire (KBE) in the 1952 New Years Honours.
