= HMS Londonderry (U76) =

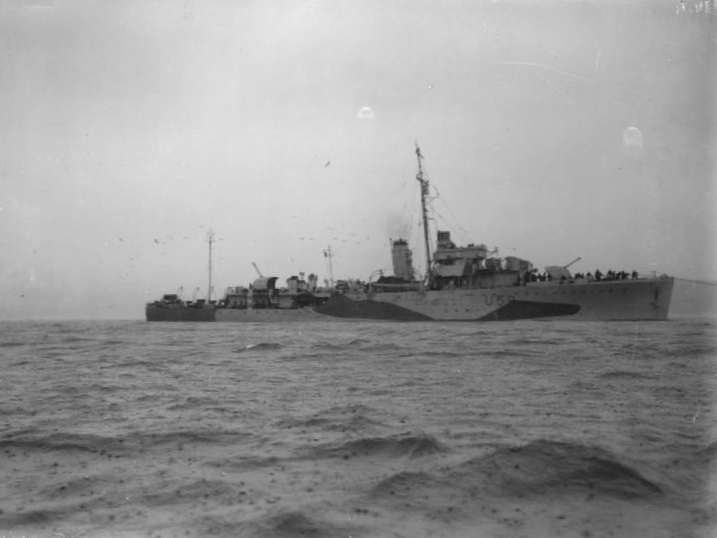
- Sister ship HMS Lowestoft in March 1943

History

United Kingdom
- Name: HMS Londonderry
- Ordered: 1 November 1932
- Builder: Devonport Dockyard
- Laid down: 11 June 1934
- Launched: 16 January 1935
- Completed: 20 September 1935
- Fate: Scrapped 1948

General characteristics
- Class & type: Grimsby-class sloop
- Displacement: 990 long tons (1,010 t) standard
- Length: 266 ft 3 in (81.15 m) o/a
- Beam: 36 ft (11.0 m)
- Draught: 9 ft 6 in (2.90 m) (full load)
- Propulsion: Two Admiralty 3-drum water-tube boilers; Parsons geared steam turbines; Two shafts; 2,000 shp (1,500 kW)
- Speed: 16.5 kn (30.6 km/h; 19.0 mph)
- Range: 6,000 nmi (11,000 km; 6,900 mi) at 10 kn (19 km/h; 12 mph)
- Complement: 100
- Armament: 2 × 4.7 in (120 mm) Mark IX guns; 1 × QF 3 inch 20 cwt anti-aircraft gun; 4 × 3-pounder guns

HMS Londonderry was a Grimsby-class sloop of the Royal Navy. Built at Devonport Dockyard in the 1930s, Londonderry was launched in early 1935 and commissioned later that year. She served in the Red Sea and the South Atlantic until the outbreak of the Second World War. Londonderry served as a convoy escort during the war, which she survived. The ship was sold for scrap in 1948.

== Construction and design ==
HMS Londonderry was one of two Grimsby-class sloops constructed under the 1933 construction for the Royal Navy. She was ordered from Devonport Dockyard on 1 March 1934. Two Grimsby-class sloops had been ordered under each of the 1931 and 1932 programmes, and two more would be ordered in the programme for next year, giving a total of eight Grimsby-class ships built for the Royal Navy. Four more were built for Australia and one for India. The Grimsby class, while based on the previous Shoreham class, was intended to be a more capable escort vessel than previous sloops, and carried a more powerful armament.

Londonderry was 266 feet 3 inches (81.15 m) long overall, with a beam of 36 feet (10.97 m) and a draught of 9 feet 6 inches (2.90 m) at deep load. Displacement was 990 long tons (1,010 t) standard, and 1,355 long tons (1,377 t) full load. The ship was powered by two geared steam turbines driving two shafts, fed by two Admiralty 3-drum boilers. This machinery produced 2,000 shaft horsepower (1,500 kW) and could propel the ship to a speed of 16.5 knots (30.6 km/h; 19.0 mph). The ship had a range of 6,000 nautical miles (11,000 km; 6,900 mi) at 10 knots (19 km/h; 12 mph).

Two 4.7 in (120 mm) Mark IX guns were mounted fore and aft on the ship's centreline. As the 4.7 inch guns were low-angle guns, not suited to anti-aircraft use, a single QF 3 inch 20 cwt anti-aircraft gun (Note: "Cwt" is the abbreviation for hundredweight, 20 cwt referring to the weight of the gun.) was mounted in "B" position. Four 3-pounder saluting guns and eight machine guns completed the ship's gun armament. The initial anti-submarine armament was small, with a design loadout of four depth charges. The ship could be fitted for minesweeping or minelaying (for which the aft 4.7 inch gun was removed, allowing 40 mines to be loaded) as well as escort duties. The ship had a crew of 103 officers and men.

Londonderry was laid down on 11 June 1934 and was launched on 16 January 1935. She was formally commissioned on 17 September 1935 with construction completing on 20 September that year.

=== Modifications ===
Londonderry underwent a major refit in 1939, which replaced the 4.7-inch and 3-inch guns with 2 twin QF 4 inch (102 mm) Mk XVI anti-aircraft guns. Anti-aircraft armament increased by the addition of Oerlikon 20 mm cannon throughout the war, with the close-in anti-aircraft outfit reaching six Oerlikons by 1943. Anti-submarine armament gradually increased throughout the ship's career. The number of depth charges carried increased first to 40, matching that carried by the last two ships of the Grimsby-class, and later to 60. A Hedgehog anti-submarine mortar was fitted in 1943 while the ship was being repaired after her stern was blown off.

Type 286 radar was fitted during 1941, later supplemented by Type 271 and Type 291, while HF/DF radio direction-finding gear was also fitted.

== Service ==
On commissioning, Londonderry sailed to her station as part of the Red Sea division, her presence on station being made more urgent by the ongoing Abyssinia Crisis caused by the threat of war between Italy and Ethiopia. She remained based in the Red Sea until 1938, interrupted by regular maintenance periods at Malta. In April 1938 Londonderry left the Red Sea and was refitted at Simonstown naval base in South Africa before joining the South Atlantic Station in June 1938. The ship underwent a major refit at Simonstown from February to July 1939, being fitted with a more capable anti-aircraft armament, with dual-purpose 4-inch guns replacing the low-angle 4.7-inch guns previously fitted.

The outbreak of the Second World War in September 1939 saw Londonderry initially used for local patrols in South African waters, before deploying north to Freetown, Sierra Leone in October that year, carrying out minesweeping and local escort duties. On 24 November 1939 she left West Africa for British waters, arriving at Devonport on 12 December when she underwent a brief refit. On completing the refit, she joined the Rosyth Escort Force, providing anti-aircraft escort for convoys running along Britain's East coast. On 14 February 1940 Londonderry was part of the escort of Convoy FS.96, bound for Southend, when a submarine was detected and attacked by Londonderry and the destroyer Westminster. On 11 November 1940, Londonderry, along with the destroyer Vivien, formed the escort for Convoy FN332, from Southend to Methil, when the convoy came under attack from German bombers. Both Londonderry and Vivien claimed one bomber shot down, while the tug St. Mellons claimed a German fighter.

In December 1940, Londonderry was transferred to Western Approaches Command, operating out of Liverpool as part of 1st Anti-Aircraft Division, serving as a convoy escort in the Western Approaches. She transferred to Newfoundland in June 1941, based at St John's. Service in the Western Atlantic was brief, however, and Londonderry crossed the Atlantic in July, joining the Sloop Division at her namesake port of Londonderry, and operating as part of the 42nd Escort Group.

In December 1941 Londonderry joined 40th Escort Group escorting convoys to Freetown. On 31 January 1942, the 40th Escort Group, including Londonderry was escorting Convoy SL 98 when the convoy was attacked by the German submarine U-105, which torpedoed and sank the sloop Culver. Londonderry picked up 13 survivors from Culver, with the remaining 127 of Culver's crew killed. From April to June 1942 Londonderry was refitted at Avonmouth. She then rejoined 40th Escort Group. On 14 July 1942 Londonderry was part of the escort for Convoy SL115 when the sloop Lulworth detected nearby radio signals using her HF/DF gear, and on investigating the signal, discovered the German submarine U-130 and the Italian submarine Pietro Calvi on the surface, which both promptly dived. Lulworth depth charged Pietro Calvi, forcing the Italian submarine to the surface, where she was badly damaged by gunfire and ramming. Londonderry went to the assistance of Lulworth, which boarded the Italian submarine. The boarding attempt was aborted when U-130 attempted to torpedo Lulworth, which responded with depth charges, which drove off the German submarine, but also hastened Pietro Calvi's sinking. 35 of the 78-man crew of Calvi was rescued by the British ships.

From October 1942 to January 1943 Londonderry was employed escorting convoys to North Africa following Operation Torch, the Anglo-American invasion of French North Africa. On 3 February 1943, Londonderry part of the escort for Convoy HX224, was attacking a suspected submarine contact when she was badly damaged by an underwater explosion, possibly due to premature detonation of her depth charges. (Note: While both Hague and Smith attribute the explosion to Londonderry's depth charges, H.M. Ships Damaged or Sunk by Enemy Action claims the damage was as a result of a torpedo. Both Smith and H.M. Ships Damaged or Sunk by Enemy Action state the incident occurred on 3 February while Hague states 4 February.) Four of her crew were killed. Her stern was badly damaged and broke off when the ship was under tow. The ship underwent temporary repairs at Londonderry, then on 12 March was towed to Devonport for permanent repairs, which lasted until November that year.

After the repairs were completed, Londonderry joined the 39th Escort Group, escorting convoys between Britain and Gibraltar. On 5 February 1944 she collided with the trawler Cape Argona but received little damage. In May 1944 Londonderry joined the 41st Escort Group, based at Devonport, escorting shipping in the English Channel in preparation for the upcoming invasion of France. During Operation Neptune, the landings in France, Londonderry acted as an escort and as a command ship for landing craft. Once landings were complete, she returned to escort operations in the Channel.

Londonderry left operational service after VE Day and was laid up in reserve at Milford Haven in May 1945. She was transferred to BISCO for scrapping on 8 March 1948 and was scrapped by E Rees at Llanelly from 8 June 1948.

== Pennant number ==
Note: The Pennant number was not painted on the ship's side until September 1939.

Pennant number	From	To
L76	1935	April 1940
U76	April 1940	1945
