= HMS Aberdeen =

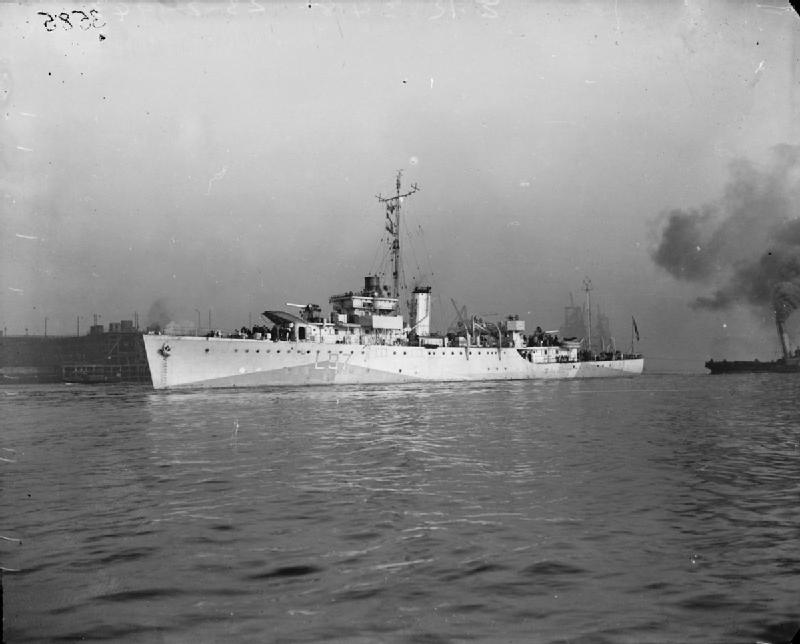
- HMS Aberdeen, underway on the Tyne; Pennant No L97

History

United Kingdom
- Name: HMS Aberdeen
- Ordered: 1 March 1935
- Builder: Devonport Dockyard
- Laid down: 12 June 1935
- Launched: 22 January 1936
- Sponsored by: Mrs E Watt
- Commissioned: 17 September 1936
- Identification: Pennant number: L97 (later U97)
- Motto: Bon accord; ("Good fellowship")
- Honours and awards: Atlantic 1939–45; North Africa 1942
- Fate: Sold for scrapping, 16 December 1948
- Badge: On a Field Red, a triple towered castle surrounded by a double treasure all Silver.

General characteristics
- Class & type: Grimsby-class sloop
- Displacement: 990 long tons (1,006 t) standard; 1,300 long tons (1,321 t) full
- Length: 250 ft (76.2 m) p/p; 266 ft (81.1 m) o/a
- Beam: 36 ft (11.0 m)
- Draught: 7 ft 6 in (2.29 m)
- Propulsion: Parsons geared steam turbines; 2 × Admiralty 3-drum water-tube boilers; 2 shafts; 2,000 shp (1,500 kW)
- Speed: 16.5 knots (30.6 km/h; 19.0 mph)
- Range: 5,700 nmi (10,600 km; 6,600 mi) at 10 kn (19 km/h; 12 mph)
- Complement: 100
- Armament: 2 × 4 in (100 mm) QF guns; 4 × 0.5-inch (12.7 mm) AA machine guns; 1 × Hedgehog anti-submarine mortar (from late 1942)

HMS Aberdeen was a Grimsby-class sloop in the British Royal Navy. Built in Devonport Dockyard, Plymouth, UK by Thornycroft (Southampton, UK), she was launched on 22 January 1936.

== Construction and design ==
HMS Aberdeen was one of two Grimsby-class sloops constructed under the 1934 construction programme for the Royal Navy. She was ordered from Devonport Dockyard on 1 March 1935. Two Grimsby-class sloops had been ordered under each of the 1931, 1932 and 1933 programmes, giving a total of eight Grimsby-class ships built for the Royal Navy. Four more were built for Australia and one for India. The Grimsby class, while based on the previous Shoreham class, was intended to be a more capable escort vessel than previous sloops, and carried a more powerful armament.

Aberdeen was 266 feet 3 inches (81.15 m) long overall, with a beam of 36 feet (10.97 m) and a draught of 9 feet 6 inches (2.90 m) at deep load. Displacement was 990 long tons (1,010 t) standard, and 1,355 long tons (1,377 t) full load. The ship was powered by two geared steam turbines driving two shafts, fed by two Admiralty 3-drum boilers. This machinery produced 2,000 shaft horsepower (1,500 kW) and could propel the ship to a speed of 16.5 knots (30.6 km/h; 19.0 mph). The ship had a range of 6,000 nautical miles (11,000 km; 6,900 mi) at 10 knots (19 km/h; 12 mph).

While previous ships of the class had been built with a gun armament of 4.7-inch (120 mm) low-angle guns, designed for use against surface targets, by 1934 it was realised that attack from the air posed a significant risk to shipping, and it was decided to fit the sloops of the 1934 programme with an improved anti-aircraft armament. It was planned to equip Aberdeen with three 4-inch (102 mm) dual purpose (anti-aircraft and anti-surface) guns, but she was completed as a despatch vessel, with the aft 4-inch gun and minesweeping gear replaced by extra accommodation. Close-in anti-aircraft defence was provided by a single quadruple .50 in (12.7 mm) Vickers anti-aircraft machine gun mount.

Aberdeen was laid down on 14 June 1935, launched on 22 January 1936 and completed on 17 September 1936.

=== Modifications ===
Aberdeen was fitted with the originally planned third 4-inch gun in 1939, with four Oerlikon 20 mm cannon added during the war. The ship's depth charge loading increased from 15 to 60–90 during the war, while a Hedgehog anti-submarine mortar was fitted in 1942, replacing the forward 4-inch gun.

== Service history ==
Aberdeen was fitted for use as despatch vessel during construction, and was used by the Commander-in-Chief of the Mediterranean Fleet, replacing the First-World War vintage sloop Bryony in the role from November 1936. She returned to British waters in May 1937 to allow her to take part in the Fleet Review celebrating the Coronation of King George VI, before returning to the Mediterranean, where she served up until the outbreak of World War II. Recalled to UK at the outbreak of war she was deployed with 1st Escort Division of Western Approaches Command for convoy escort duty in English Channel and SW Approaches. In June 1940 she was transferred to Rosyth for escort of convoys in North Sea and NW Approaches. This redeployment was made consequent on the re-routing of Atlantic convoy traffic from Channel because of the German occupation of France November 1940 she was transferred to Liverpool Sloop Division for Atlantic convoy escort.March 1941 underwent refit, upon completion of this she resumed her North Atlantic escort duties. June 1941 she was transferred to 41st Escort Group based at Londonderry for defence of convoys between UK and Freetown. October & November 1942 participated in Operation Torch. December 1942 she went to the Tyne for refit, which continued through January and most of February. Early March she joined 40th Escort Group and took passage to St. John's, Newfoundland and was part of the escort of the badly mauled convoy HX229A. during the defense of convoy HX229A HMS Aberdeen ran aground on the ice-edge and sustained damage to hull structure including loss of underwater fittings for the submarine detection equipment. On arrival in UK underwent repair at Liverpool at this time she was also fitted with an additional radar for surface and aircraft detection (Type 291) as well as VHF radio telephone equipment for communication with other escorts and with aircraft. Repairs and trials lasted iuntil 30 May. She was then deployment at Freetown for Atlantic convoy defence and continue in this role until April 1944 when she returned to UK with convoy SL154 to undergo refit. repair work required was extensive and in June she was made seaworthy to take passage to Bermuda to have her refit completed there. Post refit trials finally took place in September after which she returned to continue her duties at Freetown. This continued until VE Day. After VE Day remained at Freetown for several months carrying out local patrol and air sea rescue duties, at this time extensive air traffic was being used for return of US service personnel from Europe. August 1945 she took passage to Gibraltar to pay off into reserve. She was kept in Reserve at Gibraltar until the end of 1946 when the ship was placed on the Disposal List. After tow to Devonport she was sold to BISCO on 16 December 1948 for breaking-up by T W Ward at Hayle, Cornwall where she arrived on 19 January 1949.
