= List of wars involving Gabon =

This is a list of wars involving Gabon.

Conflict	Combatants		Result	President
Battle of Gabon (1940)				
Central African Republic Civil War (2013–	Central African Republic; South Africa; France; DR Congo; Angola; Cameroon; Chad; Congo-Brazzaville; Gabon	(Central African Republic) Séléka (Central African Republic) Anti-balaka	Gabon forces withdrew following accusations of sexual crimes.	Ali Bongo Ondimba
