= HMS Grimsby =

Two ships of the Royal Navy have been named HMS Grimsby :

- HMS Grimsby (U16) was a Grimsby-class sloop commissioned in 1934 and sunk in 1941.
- HMS Grimsby (M108) is a Sandown-class minehunter originally of the British Royal Navy serving from 1999 to 2022, then transferred to Ukrainian Navy and renamed Chernihiv and in service since 2023.
