= HMS Milford (L51) =

Sloop of the Royal Navy

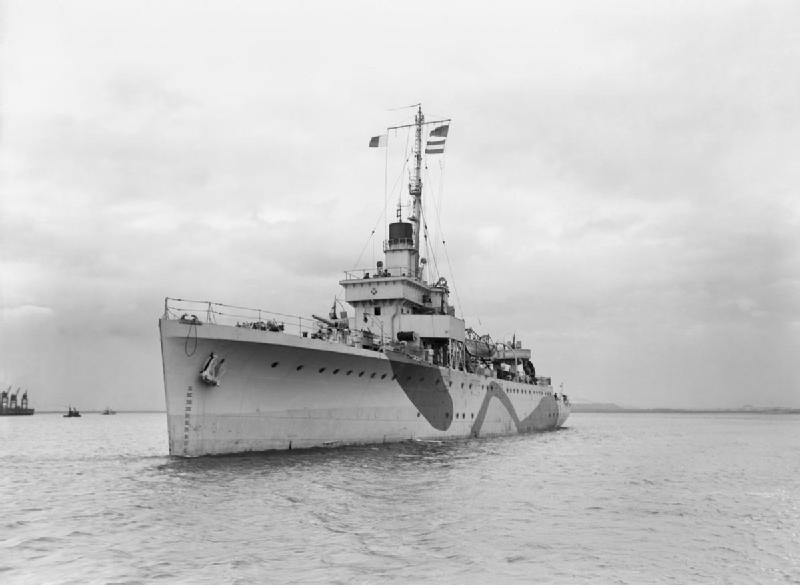
- HMS Milford in 1944

History

United Kingdom
- Name: Milford
- Ordered: 24 April 1931
- Builder: Devonport Dockyard
- Laid down: 14 September 1931
- Launched: 11 June 1932
- Completed: 22 December 1932
- Decommissioned: 1946
- Identification: Pennant number: L51 (1932–1940), U51 (1940-1949)
- Fate: Sold for scrap 3 June 1949

General characteristics
- Class & type: Shoreham-class sloop
- Displacement: 1,105 long tons (1,123 t)
- Length: 281 ft (86 m)
- Beam: 35 ft (11 m)
- Draught: 8 ft 3 in (2.51 m)
- Propulsion: Geared turbines, 2 shafts, 2,000 shp (1,491 kW)
- Speed: 16 knots (30 km/h; 18 mph)
- Complement: 95
- Armament: 2 × QF 4 in (100 mm) Mk V guns (2×1); 4 × .5-inch anti-aircraft machine guns (1×4)

HMS Milford was a Shoreham-class sloop (Note: Officially classified as a member of the "repeat Shoreham class", sometimes described as the Falmouth class.) of the British Royal Navy built at Devonport Dockyard in 1931–1932. After peacetime operations on the Africa Station during the 1930s, Milford served during the Second World War. Her wartime service between 1939 and 1943 mostly involved convoy escort duties off Africa, but in 1940 she also took part in Operation Catapult and Operation Menace, both targeting Vichy French forces at Dakar, Senegal, and in the Battle of Gabon, in which she damaged the Vichy French submarine Poncelet so severely that Poncelet's commander Bertrand de Saussine du Pont de Gault scuttled her, to ensure she did not fall into enemy hands. After training duty in 1944 and 1945, Milford was placed in reserve in 1946 and sold in 1949.

Milford's original pennant number was L51, but it was changed to U51 sometime in May or June 1940.

== Construction and design ==
The British Admiralty ordered four sloops as part of the 1930 construction programme, with two each ordered from Devonport and Chatham dockyards. Classified as repeat Shoreham or Falmouth-class ships, they, like the four Shoreham-class sloops ordered under the 1929 construction programme, were a lengthened and improved version of the Hastings class of the 1928 programme, which were themselves a modification of the Bridgewater class. They were intended for a dual role of patrol service in overseas stations in peacetime and minesweeping during war.

Milford was 281 feet 4 inches (85.75 m) long overall, with a beam of 35 feet (10.67 m) and a draught of 10 feet 2 inches (3.10 m) at full load. Displacement was 1,060 long tons (1,080 t) standard and 1,515 long tons (1,539 t) deep load. Two Admiralty 3-drum water-tube boilers fed two geared steam turbines which drove two propeller shafts. The machinery was rated at 2,000 shaft horsepower (1,500 kW), giving a speed of 16.5 knots (30.6 km/h; 19.0 mph).

The ship's main gun armament consisted of two 4-inch (102 mm) QF Mk V guns mounted fore-and-aft on the ship's centreline, with the forward gun on a high-angle (HA) anti-aircraft mounting and the aft gun on a low-angle (LA) mounting, suitable only for use against surface targets. Four 3-pounder saluting guns completed the ship's gun armament. The initial anti-submarine armament consisted of four depth charges. The ship had a crew of 100 officers and other ranks.

Milford was ordered from Devonport Dockyard on 24 April 1931 and was laid down on 14 September 1931. She was launched on 11 June 1932 and completed on 22 December 1932.

=== Modifications ===
Milford's anti-aircraft armament was improved during refits in 1937 and 1939 by replacing the aft LA 4-inch gun by a HA gun, and adding a quadruple Vickers .50 machine gun mount for close-in anti-aircraft duties. A second quadruple .50 machine gun mount was added in 1940, with the machine guns replaced by four (later five) Oerlikon 20 mm autocannon later in the war.

The ship's anti-submarine armament was also gradually increased during the war, with the number of depth charges carried increasing from 15 to as many as 60 to 90. Other wartime changes included the fitting of radar.

== Service ==
=== 1932–1939 ===
On commissioning, Milford joined the Africa Station, operating off both the west and east coast of Africa. In February 1934, she visited Bouvet Island in the far South Atlantic, carrying out survey operations and confirming the location of the remote island. Milford returned to the United Kingdom for refitting at Portsmouth Dockyard in May 1935, having steamed over 50,000 nautical miles (92,600 km; 57,500 mi) in her first commission. After this refit, she returned to the Africa Station, and was refitted again at Portsmouth from October to December 1937. In March 1938, Milford visited Tristan da Cunha, and she was refitted at Naval Base Simon's Town in Simonstown, South Africa, from January to May 1939.

=== World War II ===
==== 1939–1940 ====
The outbreak of the Second World War in September 1939 saw the Africa Station being renamed the South Atlantic Station, with Milford transferring to her war station at Freetown, Sierra Leone. Milford was used to escort convoys between South Africa and Gibraltar, before undergoing another refit at Simonstown from January to March 1940.

===== Dakar =====
On 7 July 1940, as a part of Operation Catapult, Milford, together with the aircraft carrier Hermes and the cruisers Dorsetshire and HMAS Australia, arrived off Dakar, Senegal, in order to force French Navy ships (especially the battleship Richelieu) to either join with the Royal Navy or be neutralised so they could not be seized by the Germans (a similar operation — also part of Operation Catapult — had resulted in the British attack on Mers-el-Kébir at Oran in Algeria on 3 July). Milford attempted to enter Dakar harbour with an emissary to carry out negotiations, but the French refused entry. During the night of 7-8 July a motor launch from Milford sneaked past the French defences and dropped a number four depth charges under Richelieu's stern in an unsuccessful attempt to disable her screws, then Fairey Swordfish torpedo bombers from Hermes attacked Richelieu, scoring one torpedo hit on the battleship, badly damaging the French ship. Milford subsequently returned to convoy defence duty at Freetown, but on 23 September 1940 she took part in Operation Menace, an unsuccessful attempt to seize Dakar by landing Free French forces with Royal Navy support. She then resumed her operations at Freetown.

===== Battle of Gabon =====
On 7 November 1940, Free French forces began amphibious landings to capture Gabon — at the time a territory of French Equatorial Africa — from Vichy France, resulting in the Battle of Gabon. British forces including Milford provided cover for the landings. At 07:45 Alpha Time on 7 November a Supermarine Walrus biplane flying boat from the heavy cruiser HMS Devonshire returned from a reconnaissance flight to report that the Vichy French submarine Poncelet was anchored off Port-Gentil, 8 nautical miles (15 km; 9.2 mi) bearing 138 degrees from Cape Lopez. Milford was on antisubmarine patrol to the north and northeast of Cape Lopez, and at 15:52 Alpha Time, she reported that Poncelet — which had orders to attack the transports carrying the Free French invasion force off Libreville and was heading toward the Baie des Baleiniers — had gotten underway. At 16:15, Milford reported Poncelet zigzagging on the surface on a course of 60 degrees, while Milford herself was making 16 knots (30 km/h; 18 mph) on a course of 60 degrees. At 16:19, Milford reported her own position as 00°20′S 008°50′E and that Poncelet was 7 nautical miles (13 km; 8.1 mi) distant, bearing 30 degrees and still on a course of 60 degrees.

Milford was too slow to intercept Poncelet as long as Poncelet remained on the surface and undamaged, so the British task force commander, Admiral John Cunningham, ordered Devonshire to launch a Walrus to attack Poncelet in the hope of either damaging her or forcing her to dive, which in either case would slow her and give Milford a chance to overtake her. Devonshire launched the Walrus at 16:50 Alpha Time. At 17:00 Alpha Time, Milford reported herself at 00°11′S 008°57′E and that Poncelet was 6.5 nautical miles (12.0 km; 7.5 mi) distant, making 16 knots (30 km/h; 18 mph) and steering a course of 39 degrees. The Walrus straddled Poncelet with two 100-pound (45 kg) depth charges, damaging her and forcing her to submerge.

At 17:20 Alpha Time, Milford reported that Poncelet had altered course to the west and submerged and that she was engaging Poncelet. Poncelet fired a torpedo at Milford which passed under Milford without exploding. Poncelet attempted to fire a second torpedo, but it got stuck in its tube, gave off toxic smoke into the interior of the submarine, and created a leak. Milford depth-charged Poncelet, damaging her and forcing her to the surface, then opened gunfire on her. Poncelet submerged again, but was too badly damaged to withstand the dive, and her crew faced the danger of asphyxiation from the smoke emitted by the torpedo, so Poncelet′s commanding officer, Capitaine de corvette (Corvette Captain) Bertrand de Saussine du Pont de Gault, ordered the submarine to surface and her crew to abandon ship. Soon after engaging Poncelet, Milford reported that Poncelet had surfaced at 00°04′S 008°56′E.

The British light cruiser HMS Delhi received orders at 18:01 Alpha Time to close with Poncelet and put a prize crew aboard her. At 18:05, Milford signaled that Poncelet′s engines had broken down and that she had surrendered. Once certain that his crew was safe, de Saussine went back aboard Poncelet and opened her seacocks, scuttling her at 00°20′S 008°50′E to prevent her from falling into enemy hands. He decided to remain aboard as she sank and went down with his ship, the only member of Poncelet′s crew lost in her sinking. At 18:20, Milford reported that Poncelet had been scuttled and that she was picking up survivors. Although Delhi received orders to assist in the rescue, Milford brought aboard all 54 survivors — three officers and 51 enlisted men.

Delhi reported at 19:22 Alpha Time on 7 November 1940 that she was in company with Milford and the British auxiliary naval trawler HMS Turcoman at 00°01′N 009°03′E and that the prisoners-of-war from Poncelet would spend the night of 7–8 November aboard Milford. Devonshire rendezvoused with Milford at 05:45 Alpha Time on 8 November 1940 to receive a full report on Milford′s engagement with Poncelet. Milford transferred Poncelet′s survivors to Delhi at 07:45 Alpha Time on 9 November 1940 while a Walrus from Devonshire flew over the scene to provide antisubmarine cover. In December 1940, Milford resumed convoy defence operations at Freetown.

==== 1941–1943 ====
Between 8 January and 1 February 1941, Milford joined the escort of two military convoys during the leg of their voyages between Freetown and the Cape of Good Hope. She then resumed local convoy defense duties at Freetown until May 1941, when she moved to Simonstown for a refit. Upon its completion, she remained at Simonstown from July to October 1941 to provide convoy defence in the South Atlantic and the Indian Ocean. She returned to Freetown in November 1941 to resume local convoy defense operations there.

Milford joined the escort of Convoy WS15 during the leg of its voyage between Freetown and Durban, South Africa, between 29 January and 13 February 1942, then moved to Cape Town, South Africa. She participated in local convoy defence from Cape Town, including convoy escort duty between Cape Town and Durban. Between 18 and 23 April 1942 she escorted a military convoy on the Freetown-Cape Town leg of its voyage, and in May 1942 returned to Freetown for local convoy defence operations there. She escorted another convoy from Freetown to Cape Town between 26 May and 6 June 1942, then returned to Freetown.

In July 1942, Milford proceeded from Freetown to Rio de Janeiro, Brazil, for a refit in a Brazilian Navy dockyard. After its completion, she returned to Freetown in September 1942 to resume local convoy escort duties. From 23 to 31 October 1942, she joined the escort of a convoy from Freetown to Cape Town. She returned to Freetown in November 1942 and remained on local convoy defence duty there through July 1943.

In August 1943, Milford proceeded to the United Kingdom for a refit on the River Clyde. After its completion in September 1943, she was assigned to the 40th Escort Group the for defence of convoys on the Gibraltar-West Africa-United Kingdom route. While she was escorting Convoys SL 139 and MKS 30, the convoys came under glider bomb attack by Luftwaffe Heinkel He 177 aircraft on 21 November 1943. Milford returned to the United Kingdom in December 1943 and was laid up at Ardrossan, Scotland, due to the poor condition of her hull.

==== 1944–1945 ====
In May 1944, Milford proceeded to the River Tees for refit and conversion to an escort and submarine training target for the 10th Submarine Flotilla. The conversion included the removal of her antisubmarine warfare armament and the installation of a davit for torpedo recovery and a Type 271 surface search radar. Upon completion of her refit, conversion, and post-conversion trials in October 1944, she headed for Rothesay, Scotland, to join the 10th Submarine Flotilla. She remained on at Rothesay on escort and target ship duty through the end of World War II in August 1945.

=== Post-World War II ===
After the end of hostilities, Milford continued her training duties with the 10th Submarine Flotilla at Rothesay until December 1945, when she transferred to the 7th Submarine Flotilla for a refit on the Clyde. She was placed in reserve in 1946 and on the disposal list in 1949. She was sold to the British Iron & Steel Corporation (BISCO) on 3 June 1949 for scrapping, and arrived at the breaker's yard on 22 July 1949.

== Bibliography ==
- Campbell, N. J. M. (1980). "Great Britain (including Empire Forces)". In Chesneau, Roger (ed.). Conway's All the World's Fighting Ships 1922–1946. Greenwich, UK: Conway Maritime Press. pp. 2–85. ISBN 0-85177-146-7.
- Clayton, Anthony (2014). Three Republics, One Navy: A Naval History of France 1870–1999. Solihull, England: Helion & Company Limited. ISBN 978-1-911096-74-0.
- Hague, Arnold (1993). Sloops: A History of the 71 Sloops Built in Britain and Australia for the British, Australian and Indian Navies 1926–1946. Kendal, UK: World Ship Society. ISBN 0-905617-67-3.
- Jennings, Eric T. (2015). French Africa in World War II. Cambridge University Press. ISBN 978-1107048485.
- Jordan, John & Dumas, Robert (2009). French Battleships 1922–1956. Barnsley: Seaforth Publishing. ISBN 978-1-84832-034-5.
- Picard, Claude (2006). Les Sous-marins de 1 500 tonnes (in French). Rennes: Marines Éditions. ISBN 2-915379-55-6.
- Rohwer, Jürgen; Hümmelchen, Gerhard (1992). Chronology of the War at Sea 1939–1945. London: Greenhill Books. ISBN 1-85367-117-7.
- Williams, John (1976). The Guns of Dakar: September 1940. London: William Heinemann Ltd. ISBN 978-0-434-86630-4.
