= Battle of Gabon =

1940 World War II battle

Coordinates: 0°23′24″N 9°27′6″E

- Part of World War II
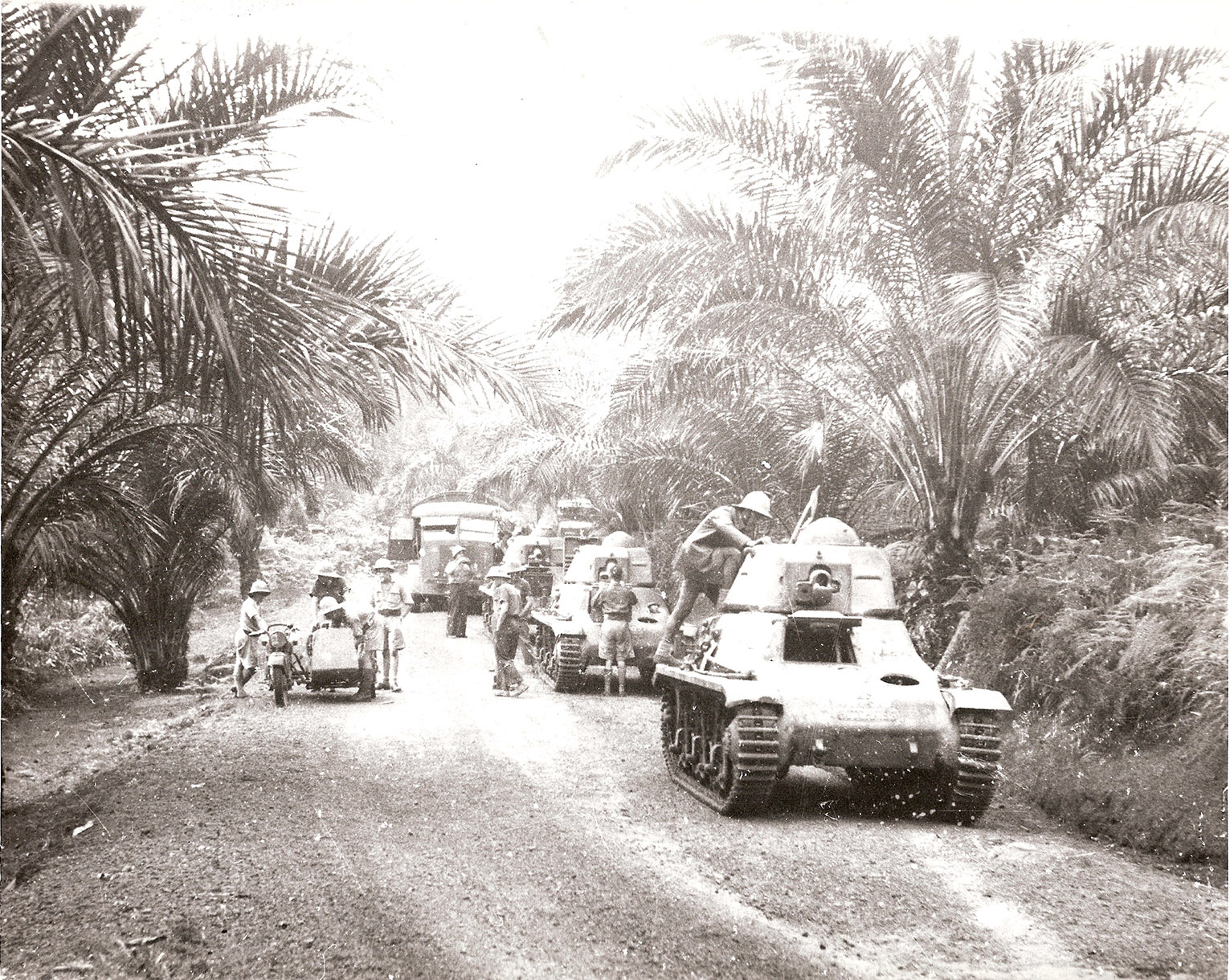
- Free French Hotchkiss H39 tanks during the Battle of Gabon
Date	27 October – 12 November 1940 (2 weeks and 2 days)
Location	Gabon, French Equatorial Africa
Result	Free French victory
Territorial changes	Free French Forces gain control over Gabon and the remainder of French Equatorial Africa from the Vichy regime.

Belligerents
Free France: French Chad; French Congo; French Cameroon; Naval support: United Kingdom	Vichy France: French Gabon

Commanders and leaders
(Free France) Philippe Leclerc; (Free France) Georges d'Argenlieu; (United Kingdom) John Cunningham	(Vichy France) Georges Masson †; (Vichy France) Marcel Têtu (POW)

Strength
Free French: 1,060 men 1 aviso 1 minesweeper 1 cargo ship Royal Navy: 1 heavy cruiser 1 sloop	1,500 men 1 aviso 1 submarine

Casualties and losses
20–100 killed 4 aircraft destroyed	At least 35 killed 1 aviso destroyed 1 submarine scuttled

The Battle of Gabon (French: Bataille du Gabon), also called the Gabon Campaign (Campagne du Gabon), occurred in November 1940 during World War II. The battle resulted in forces under the orders of General Charles de Gaulle taking the colony of Gabon and its capital, Libreville, from Vichy France, and the rallying of French Equatorial Africa to Free France.

== Background ==
In June 1940, Germany invaded and defeated France, and subsequently occupied a portion of the country. Philippe Pétain established a collaborationist government in Vichy to administer unoccupied French territory. On 18 June French General Charles De Gaulle broadcast an appeal over the radio to his compatriots abroad, calling on them to reject the Vichy regime and join the United Kingdom in its war against Germany and Italy. The broadcast provoked division in France's African territories, where colonists were forced to choose sides.

On 26 August, the governor and military commanders in the colony of French Chad announced that they were rallying to De Gaulle's Free French Forces. A small group of Gaullists seized control of French Cameroon the following morning, and on 28 August a Free French official ousted the pro-Vichy governor of French Congo. The next day the governor of Ubangi-Shari declared that his territory would support De Gaulle. His declaration prompted a brief struggle for power with a pro-Vichy army officer, but by the end of the day all of the colonies that formed French Equatorial Africa had rallied to Free France, except for French Gabon. On the evening of 28–29 August 1940, Governor Georges Masson had pledged Gabon's allegiance to Free France. He met immediate opposition from much of Libreville's French population and from Gabon's influential, conservative Catholic bishop, Louis Tardy, who favoured Vichy France's anti-Freemason policies. Facing pressure, Masson was forced to rescind his pledge. Free French sympathizers were subsequently arrested by the colonial administration and either imprisoned on board the auxiliary cruiser Cap des Palmes or deported to Dakar, Senegal. De Gaulle was perturbed by Gabon's refusal to join his cause and described his dilemma in his memoirs: "a hostile enclave, that was hard to reduce because it gave on to the ocean, was created in the heart of our equatorial holdings." General Edgard de Larminat stated that the failure to secure the territory would threaten "the very principle of our presence in Africa."

== Prelude ==
Following the rallying of Cameroon on 27 August, the authorities in Gabon decided to reinforce their frontier with that province along with the Ntem river. On 3 September, Roger Gardet entered Bitam by a ruse. On the pretext of medical necessity, he received permission from Captain Gourvès at Bitam to cross the frontier. Gourvès agreed to rally his troops to Free France only if his superior, the chief administrator of Woleu-Ntem based at Oyem, a certain Besson, did the same. Besson at first refused, but on 5 September Gardet informed him that he was relieving him of his command. Besson left for Cameroon and the following day, 6 September, Free French forces arrived in Bitam and Oyem with Pierre Roger Martocq as the new administrator of Woleu-Ntem.

On 11 September, Masson held a meeting with his army and navy commanders at which it was decided to reinforce Mayumba. On 9 and 15 September, Colonel André Parant brought a dozen Free French fighters into Mayumba on a Potez 540. On 15 September, Vichy reinforcements arrived on the Cap des Palmes, escorted by the submarine Poncelet: a troop of marines from the aviso Bougainville and the defence of Port-Gentil. While the commander of the submarine, Captain Bertrand de Saussine du Pont de Gault was breakfasting with the district administrator, the Free French invaded the administrator's residence. After several hours of discussions, and with Parant's men occupying the city, Saussine was permitted to leave, taking with him whoever did not wish to join the Free French. Most of the marines opted to stay in Mayumba. On 7 October, Free French forces from Moyen-Congo occupied Booué.

On 8 October, De Gaulle arrived in Douala, Cameroon. Four days later he authorised plans for the invasion of French Equatorial Africa. He wanted to use French Equatorial Africa as a base to launch attacks into Axis-controlled Libya. For this reason, he personally headed northward to survey the situation in Chad, located on the southern border of Libya. The Free French devised a two-prong attack, whereby one force from Douala would invade northern Gabon and another would attack southern Gabon from Moyen-Congo before both converged on Libreville.

== Battle ==
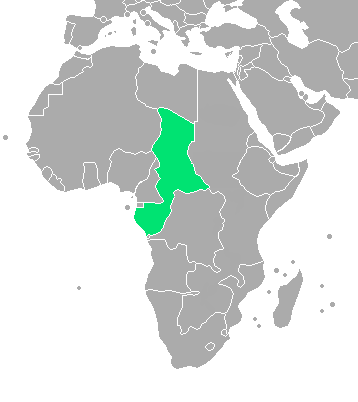
French Equatorial Africa

On 27 October 1940, Free French forces crossed into French Equatorial Africa and took the town of Mitzic. The European officers and colonists in the town fled following a Free French aerial bombardment, and the remaining Gabonese soldiers rallied to the Free French.

On 5 November, the Vichy garrison at Lambaréné capitulated. After Vichy officers fled, the Gabonese soldiers looted the town. Meanwhile, the main Free French forces under General Philippe Leclerc and Battalion Chief (major) Marie Pierre Koenig departed from Douala. Their goal was to take Libreville in French Equatorial Africa. The British expressed doubt in De Gaulle's ability to establish control over the Vichy territory, but they eventually agreed to lend naval support to the Free French. (Note: Eric Jennings, a historian, speculates that dissatisfaction with Pétain's handshake with German leader Adolf Hitler at Montoire-sur-le-Loir on 24 October 1940 crystallised British resolve to lend military aid to Free France.) The British limited their involvement to a naval blockade of the territory. French Foreign Legion officer John Hasey reported that after the first few days of fighting, 150 prisoners were taken who joined the Free French a few weeks later – "no one tried to convince them. They argued it out among themselves and joined up voluntarily."

On 7 November, Free French forces under Leclerc landed at the Bay of Mondah. In response, Commander Robert Morin of the Vichy French sloop Bougainville ordered the Redoutable-class submarine Poncelet to attack the Free French naval force.

On 8 November, the Shoreham-class sloop HMS Milford discovered Poncelet shadowing the Anglo-French task force and gave chase. The sloop was too slow to intercept the submarine, so Admiral Cunningham ordered his flagship, HMS Devonshire, to launch its Supermarine Walrus biplane. The aircraft straddled the submarine with two salvos of 100-pound (45 kg) depth charges as it attempted to dive, damaging it. The captain of the submarine evacuated his crew and then opened the vessel's sea valves, scuttling it off Port-Gentil. Koenig's forces landed at Pointe La Mondah on the night of 8 November. His forces included French Legionnaires (including the 13th Foreign Legion Demi-Brigade), Senegalese and Cameroonian troops.

On 9 November, Free French Westland Lysander aircraft operating out of Douala bombed Libreville aerodrome. The aerodrome was eventually captured, despite stiff resistance met by Koenig's force in its approach. Free French naval forces consisting of the minesweeper Commandant Dominé and the cargo vessel Casamance were led by Georges Thierry d'Argenlieu aboard the Bougainville-class aviso Savorgnan de Brazza in conducting coastal operations. Meanwhile, De Brazza encountered Bougainville on the Ogooué River. Following an attack by Free French aircraft, the Bougainville opened fire on De Brazza. As one third of its crew was on land to counter the invasion, its fire proved erratic and ineffective. After 20 minutes, the Vichy ship was disabled and set ablaze. Libreville was captured on 10 November.

On 12 November, the final Vichy forces at Port Gentil surrendered without a fight. Governor Georges Masson – despairing of his actions – committed suicide.

== Aftermath ==
The Free French lost four aircraft and six aircrew in the campaign. There is disagreement about the total number of human losses. De Gaulle said "some twenty" died in the campaign. Jean-Christophe Notin claimed 33 were killed. Eliane Ebako wrote that "dozens" lost their lives, while Jean-Pierre Azéma said "roughly one hundred" were killed. Another account states that 35 Vichy troops were killed to 8 Free French.

On 15 November, de Gaulle made a personal appeal that failed to persuade most of the captured Vichy soldiers—including General Marcel Têtu—to join the Free French. As a result, they were interned as prisoners of war in Brazzaville, French Congo for the duration of the war.

With their control consolidated in Equatorial Africa, the Free French began focusing on the campaign in Italian Libya. De Gaulle relieved Leclerc of his post in Cameroon and sent him to Fort Lamy, Chad to oversee offensive preparations.

The conflict in Gabon triggered a mass migration of Gabonese to Spanish Guinea. French Equatorial Africa cut its ties with the Vichy-controlled West African territories, and rebuilt its economy around trade with nearby British possessions, namely Nigeria. Tensions between Vichy and Free French factions remained long after the invasion. The seizure of Gabon and the rest of French Equatorial Africa gave Free France new-found legitimacy; no longer was it an organization of exiles in Britain, as it now had its own sizable territory to govern.
