= Marcel Têtu =

WWII French Air Force general

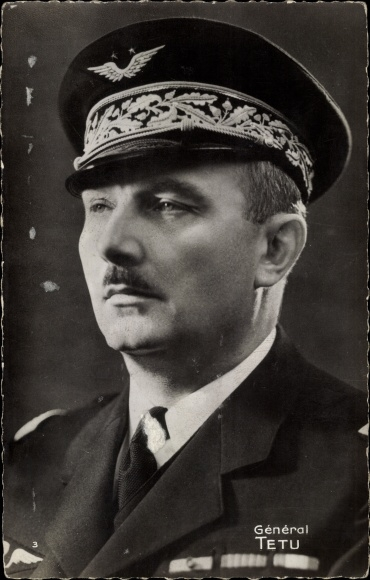
- Born: Marcel Louis Joseph Têtu; 30 October 1888; Chalon-sur-Saône, France
- Died: 15 December 1983 (aged 95); Nice, France
- Alma mater: École Polytechnique
- Military career
- Allegiance: France; Vichy France
- Branch: Armée de l'Air
- Service years: 1908–1942
- Rank: General
- Wars and battles: First World War; Second World War; Battle of France; Battle of Gabon

Marcel Louis Joseph Têtu (30 October 1888 – 15 December 1983) was a general of the French Air Force during World War II.

== Early life ==
Marcel Têtu was born in Chalon-sur-Saône, France on 30 October 1888, and he entered the French Army artillery and the air corps after graduating from the École Polytechnique in 1908.

Promoted to the rank of général de corps aérien (lieutenant general), he was appointed second in command to the Air Force Chief of Staff, General Joseph Vuillemin, by the left-wing minister Guy La Chambre.

== World War II ==
Têtu commanded the Cooperative Air Force during the Battle of France in 1940, leading both British Royal Air Force, including the British Air Forces in France, and French Air Force planes against the German Luftwaffe. He was responsible for liaison between land and air forces for the Théâtre d'Opérations du Nord-Est (North-eastern Theatre of Operations) under General Alphonse Georges. The Theatre of Operations consisted of three army groups; one of four armies (Army Group 1), one of three armies (Army Group 2) and one of one army and reserves (3rd Army Group (France)).

On 22 June 1940, he pledged his loyalty to Vichy France, and he became a colonial administrator in Gabon as Deputy Governor General of French Equatorial Africa. In October 1940, Gaullist Free French forces invaded Gabon, and Têtu was forced to surrender at Libreville on 9 November. Têtu refused to join the Free French, and he was interned in a prisoner-of-war camp for two years. He died in Nice in 1983 at the age of 95.
