= HMS Falmouth (L34) =

Sloop of the Royal Navy

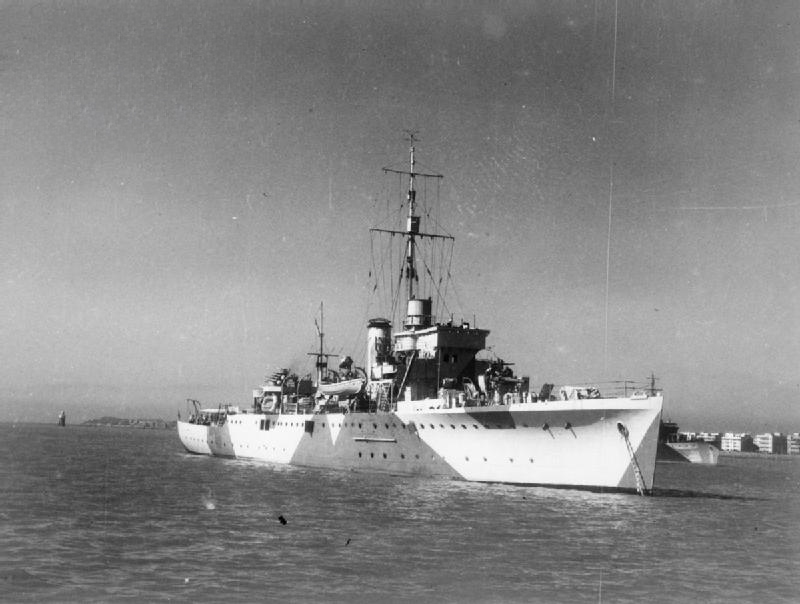
- Falmouth in 1942

History

United Kingdom
- Name: HMS Falmouth
- Builder: Devonport Dockyard
- Laid down: 14 August 1931
- Launched: 19 April 1932
- Completed: 27 October 1932
- Identification: Pennant number: L34 (later U34, F34)
- Fate: Scrapped 1968

General characteristics
- Class & type: Shoreham-class sloop
- Displacement: 1,105 long tons (1,123 t)
- Length: 281 ft (86 m)
- Beam: 35 ft (11 m)
- Draught: 8 ft 3 in (2.51 m)
- Propulsion: Geared turbines, 2 shafts, 2,000 shp (1,491 kW)
- Speed: 16 knots (18 mph; 30 km/h)
- Complement: 95
- Armament: 2 × QF 4 in (100 mm) Mk V guns (2×1); 4 × .5 inch anti-aircraft machine guns (1×4)

HMS Falmouth was a Shoreham-class sloop (Note: Officially classified as being a member of the "repeat Shoreham-class", although sometimes described as the Falmouth-class) of the British Royal Navy. Falmouth was built at Devonport Dockyard in 1931–1932. The ship was used as a despatch vessel on the China Station in the 1930s, but the Second World War resulted in her being rearmed, and used for escort duties. From 1952, Falmouth was used as a stationary drillship until she was scrapped in 1968.

== Construction and design ==
The British Admiralty ordered four sloops as part of the 1930 construction programme, with three ordered from Devonport and one from Chatham dockyard. Classified as repeat Shoreham or Falmouth-class ships, they, like the four Shoreham-class sloops ordered under the 1929 construction programme, were a lengthened and improved version of the Hastings class of the 1928 programme, which were themselves a modification of the Bridgewater class. They were intended for a dual role of patrol service in overseas stations in peacetime and minesweeping during war.

Falmouth was 281 feet 4 inches (85.75 m) long overall, with a beam of 35 feet (10.67 m) and a draught of 10 feet 2 inches (3.10 m) at full load. Displacement was 1,060 long tons (1,080 t) standard and 1,515 long tons (1,539 t) deep load. Two Admiralty 3-drum water-tube boilers fed two geared steam turbines which drove two propeller shafts. The machinery was rated at 2,000 shaft horsepower (1,500 kW), giving a speed of 16.5 knots (30.6 km/h; 19.0 mph).

The ship was completed as a despatch vessel, so had a reduced armament compared with the other members of the class. Main gun armament consisted of a single 4-inch (102 mm) QF Mk V guns mounted forward, on a High-Angle (HA) anti-aircraft mounting, with additional accommodation for the Admiral, his retinue and his staff replaced the aft 4-inch gun and minesweeping gear fitted to the remainder of the class. Four 3-pounder (47 mm) saluting guns completed the ship's gun armament. The ship had a crew of 100 officers and other ranks.

Falmouth was laid down at Devonport Dockyard on 31 August 1931. She was launched on 19 April 1932 and completed on 27 October 1932.

=== Modifications ===
The repeat Shorehams were modified in 1937 to 1939 to improve their anti-aircraft capability, with Falmouth having a second HA 4-inch gun fitted instead of the additional accommodation aft, and a quadruple Vickers .50 machine gun mount added for close-in anti-aircraft duties. In March 1940, she was refitted to add Sonar, and a second quadruple 0.50 machine gun mount added. During the war, the 3-pounders and multiple machine gun mounts were removed, and first two, and later four single Oerlikon 20 mm autocannon added.

The ship's anti-submarine armament was also gradually increased during the war, with the number of depth charges carried increasing from 15 to as many as 60–90. Other wartime changes included the fitting of radar.

== Service ==
=== China Station ===
On 30 October 1932, Falmouth hit a dock wall on leaving the dock, with the resultant damage reported as requiring several weeks to repair. After commissioning and workup, Falmouth was sent to the China Station where she was used as a despatch vessel for the commanding Admiral, allowing him and his staff to visit ports too small for the cruisers used as his flagship. In September 1933, Falmouth and the cruiser Kent visited Yokohama in Japan. In March 1934, Falmouth accompanied the cruiser Suffolk which carried Admiral Frederic Dreyer, the commander of the China Station, on a visit to the Philippines. In February 1935, Falmouth carried Admiral Dreyer on a visit to Singapore via Kuching, Sarawak (Kent being too large to navigate the Sarawak River), and was slightly damaged after hitting an uncharted Coral reef off Sarawak. Falmouth again visited Japan in May 1935, carrying Admiral Dreyer and escorting Kent which carried Robert Clive, the British Ambassador to Japan on a trip from Yokahama to Matsushima.

In August 1937, in one of the opening actions of the Second Sino-Japanese War, hostilities broke out between Chinese and Japanese forces in Shanghai. On 17 August 1937, Falmouth and the destroyer Duncan evacuated over 2000 British women and children from Shanghai down-river to Wusong, where the refugees were embarked on liners for onwards transfer to Hong Kong. Falmouth, along with the cruiser Danae and the American cruiser Augusta, were moored at Shanghai when they were narrowly missed by Chinese shells during an artillery duel between Chinese troops and Japanese warships on 3 September. On 4 October, Falmouth evacuated the British Ambassador to China, Hughe Knatchbull-Hugessen, who had been badly wounded when his car had been strafed by a Japanese aircraft, to Hong Kong.

=== Second World War ===
On the outbreak of the Second World War in September 1939, Falmouth remained on the China Station, carrying out patrols near Hong Kong to intercept any German shipping. In March 1940, Falmouth was refitted at Hong Kong to add Sonar and improve the ship's armament, and then from 23 March became part of the British Malaya Force - a force of British warships keeping watch on German merchant ships in Dutch East Indies harbours. Falmouth was to watch Tjilatjap in Java, where the German merchant ship Strassfurt was present. The German merchant ships were seized by the Dutch following the German invasion of the Netherlands in May 1940. Falmouth was then sent to Colombo in Ceylon (now Sri Lanka), before being deployed to the Persian Gulf. On 21 June 1940, Falmouth sank the Italian submarine Galvani off the entrance to the Gulf. Falmouth remained operating in the Gulf until December 1940, when she was refitted at Bombay.

After her refit, Falmouth returned to duties in the Gulf. On 3–4 April 1941, Rashid Ali al-Gaylani, the former Iraqi Prime Minister, launched a coup d'état, seizing power in Iraq and threatening British interests in Iraq, including the large airbase at RAF Habbaniya. In response, a convoy that was about to set out from Karachi for Malaya carrying a brigade of Indian troops was diverted to Basra in Iraq, with orders to occupy the Basra area, ensuring a base of operations if required. Falmouth formed part of the escort for the convoy, which arrived at Basra on 18 April, helping to lead the ships of the convoy along the Shatt al-Arab. The landings were not opposed by the Iraqis. Falmouth escorted more convoys to Basra as the British built up their forces in preparation for the Anglo-Iraqi War. On 25 August 1941 Britain and the Soviet Union invaded Iran, with Falmouth in charge of the landings at Khorramshahr, carrying two companies of the 3/10th Baluch Regiment. She ran aground when leaving Basra, and the Australian sloop Yarra continued on without Falmouth to ensure that Iranian naval forces at Khorramshahr did not interfere, sinking the Iranian sloop Babr and capturing two Iranian gunboats. Yarra then waited for Falmouth to arrive before the two ships landed their troops. In October 1941, Falmouth was sent to Suez, returning to Ceylon after the Japanese invasion of Malaya in December 1941.

Falmouth's duties included escorting convoys between India and Ceylon and Singapore and the Dutch East Indies, until the Japanese captured Singapore and the East Indies. From July to November 1942, Falmouth was again refitted at Bombay, and then was allocated to convoy escort duties between Bombay, Aden and ports in the Gulf. On 2 May 1943, the German submarine U-852 was attacked and badly damaged by a Vickers Wellington bomber from 621 Squadron RAF near Ras Hafun, Somalia. Attacks by aircraft of 621 Squadron and 8 Squadron continued for twelve hours, while a hunter-killer group of Falmouth, the destroyer Raider and the frigate Parret were summoned to finish the submarine off. U-852 attempted to make repairs in a small bay, but ran aground on a mud bank, with the submarine's crew abandoning ship and swimming to shore, where they were captured by shore parties landed by the three British ships and troops from the Somaliland Camel Corps. Falmouth was refitted at Durban in South Africa in June 1943, after which she was transferred to convoy escort duties along the East coast of Africa. Falmouth was refitted at Simonstown, South Africa, between December 1943 and February 1944, and again between March and June 1945.

In June 1945, Falmouth returned to the Indian Ocean, operating off Rangoon and the Burmese coast. She was allocated to take part on Operation Zipper, the planned British seaborne invasion of Malaya in September 1945, but after the Surrender of Japan was diverted to Singapore.

Falmouth returned to Britain at the end of 1946, and was laid up in reserve. It was decided to convert her into a drillship for the Royal Navy Volunteer Reserve (RNVR), and after a refit, in January 1952 she was moved to Newcastle-on-Tyne to serve with the Tyne Division of the RNVR as Calliope. She remained as a drillship on the Tyne until 30 April 1968, when she was towed away for scrapping at Blyth, Northumberland.
