= Grimsay (disambiguation) =

Grimsay may refer to several islands in Scotland:

- Grimsay, a tidal island north of Benbecula in the Outer Hebrides
- Grimsay (South East Benbecula), a tidal island south of Benbecula in the Outer Hebrides
- Graemsay, one of the Orkney Islands

See also:

- Grímsey, an island in Iceland
- Grimsby, a seaport on the Humber Estuary in Lincolnshire, England
- Grimsøy, a peninsula in Østfold, Norway
