= HMS Grimsby (U16) =

Sloop of the British Royal Navy

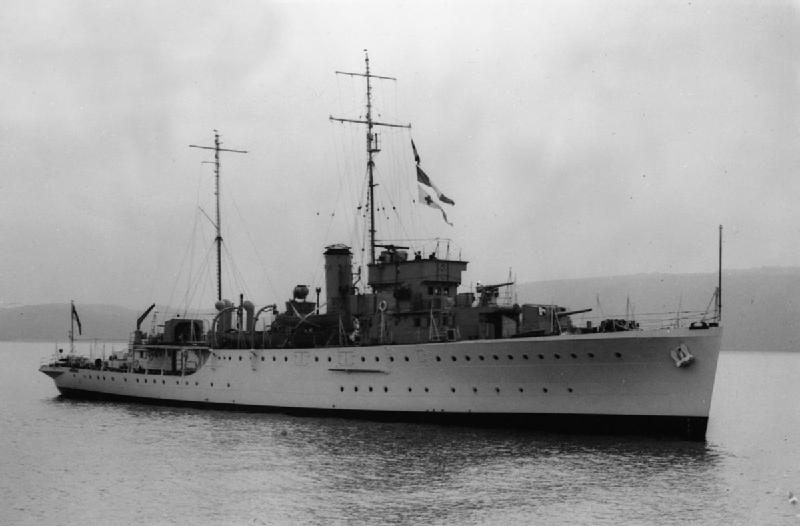
- Grimsby in 1934

History

United Kingdom
- Name: HMS Grimsby
- Ordered: 1 November 1932
- Builder: Devonport Dockyard
- Laid down: 23 January 1933
- Launched: 19 July 1933
- Completed: 17 May 1934
- Motto: "Premia post ardus"; ("Rewards come after toil")
- Honours and awards: Greece 1941, Crete 1941, Libya 1941
- Fate: Sunk 25 May 1941

General characteristics
- Class & type: Grimsby-class sloop
- Displacement: 990 long tons (1,010 t) standard
- Length: 266 ft 3 in (81.15 m) o/a
- Beam: 36 ft (11.0 m)
- Draught: 9 ft 6 in (2.90 m) (full load)
- Propulsion: Two Admiralty 3-drum water-tube boilers; Parsons geared steam turbines; Two shafts; 2,000 shp (1,500 kW)
- Speed: 16.5 kn (30.6 km/h; 19.0 mph)
- Range: 6,000 nmi (11,000 km; 6,900 mi) at 10 kn (19 km/h; 12 mph)
- Complement: 100
- Armament: 2 × 4.7 in (120 mm) Mark IX guns; 1 × QF 3 inch 20 cwt anti-aircraft gun; 4 × 3-pounder guns

HMS Grimsby was a sloop of the British Royal Navy, the lead ship of her class. Grimsby was built in the 1930s, entering service in 1934. Serving most of her pre-war service at Hong Kong, Grimsby was deployed on convoy escort duties along the East coast of the Britain and in the Mediterranean Sea during the Second World War, and was sunk by dive bombers off Tobruk on 25 May 1941.

== Construction and design ==
On 1 November 1933, the British Admiralty placed orders with Devonport Dockyard for two sloops, Grimsby and Leith, the first of a new class named after Grimsby that was eventually to number eight ships built for the Royal Navy, four for the Royal Australian Navy and one for the Royal Indian Marine. The Grimsby class, while based on the previous Shoreham class, was intended to be a more capable escort vessel than previous sloops, and carried a more powerful armament.

Grimsby was 266 feet 3 inches (81.15 m) long overall, with a beam of 36 feet (10.97 m) and a draught of 9 feet 6 inches (2.90 m) at deep load. Displacement was 990 long tons (1,010 t) standard, and 1,355 long tons (1,377 t) full load. The ship was powered by two geared steam turbines driving two shafts, fed by two Admiralty 3-drum boilers. This machinery produced 2,000 shaft horsepower (1,500 kW) and could propel the ship to a speed of 16.5 knots (30.6 km/h; 19.0 mph). The ship had a range of 6,000 nautical miles (11,000 km; 6,900 mi) at 10 knots (19 km/h; 12 mph).

Two 4.7 in (120 mm) Mark IX guns were mounted fore and aft on the ship's centreline. As the 4.7 inch guns were low-angle guns, not suited to anti-aircraft use, a single QF 3 inch 20 cwt anti-aircraft gun (Note: "Cwt" is the abbreviation for hundredweight, 20 cwt referring to the weight of the gun.) was mounted in "B" position. Four 3-pounder saluting guns and eight machine guns completed the ship's gun armament. (Note: Several of the Grimsby class were rearmed with two twin QF 4 inch Mk XVI anti-aircraft guns in 1939, but a planned upgrade of Grimsby's armament did not occur owing to pressures to keep the ship in service on East Coast convoys in 1939, along with a shortage of the gun mounts.) The ship could be fitted for minesweeping or minelaying (for which the aft 4.7 inch gun was removed) as well as escort duties. The ship had a crew of 103 officers and men.

Grimsby was laid down on 23 January 1933, launched on 19 July that year and completed on 17 May 1934.

== Service ==
Following commissioning and workup, Grimsby was deployed to the China Station, being based at Hong Kong, carrying out patrols along the coast of China seeking to deter piracy. Grimsby remained on the China station until 1939, her regular duties being punctuated by periodic dockings at Hong Kong or Singapore for refit and repair. Grimsby, along with the cruiser Dorsetshire and the American cruiser USS Marblehead, were present at Tsingtao in Eastern China on 10 January 1938, when the city was occupied by Japanese forces. Grimsby underwent a more major refit at Singapore between February and July 1939, after which she was transferred to the East Indies Station, which was responsible for operations in the Indian Ocean, Persian Gulf and Red Sea.

Following the outbreak of the Second World War, Grimsby returned to the United Kingdom, joining the Rosyth Escort Force, and escorting convoys on the East coast of the United Kingdom, mainly between the Firth of Forth and the Thames Estuary. Grimsby was refitted at Leith in April 1940, and was then sent overseas, joining the Red Sea Escort Force at the end of May 1940, escorting convoys between Aden and Suez through to March 1941.

At the end of March, Grimsby transferred to the Mediterranean, carrying out convoy escort duties, including escorting troop convoys to Greece. Germany invaded Greece on 8 April, and soon managed to overwhelm the Greek and British Commonwealth forces, with the British deciding to evacuate mainland Greece on 21 April. The evacuation operation, known as Operation Demon was carried out by naval forces under the command of Vice-Admiral Henry Pridham-Wippell, including Grimsby. On 26 April, the British steamer Scottish Prince was damaged by German bombers, and Grimsby, along with the destroyer Vampire, towed Scottish Prince to Suda Bay, Crete on 27 April. Grimsby and the netlayer Protector then towed the damaged transport HMS Glenearn from Kissamo Bay, Crete to Alexandria.

On 25 May 1941, Grimsby and the trawler Southern Main were escorting the tanker Helka to besieged Tobruk. It was customary for the RAF to provide fighter cover for such convoys along the North African coast, but this was not provided on that day, and seven Junkers Ju 87 dive bombers of the Italian 239^{a} Squadriglia attacked the convoy, sinking Hekla and damaging Grimsby. A second attack by Ju 87s of the German I/StG 1 later in the day sank Grimsby, killing eleven of Grimsby's crew at the cost of one Ju 87 shot down.
