= Grimsby-class sloop =

1933 class of sloops-of-war

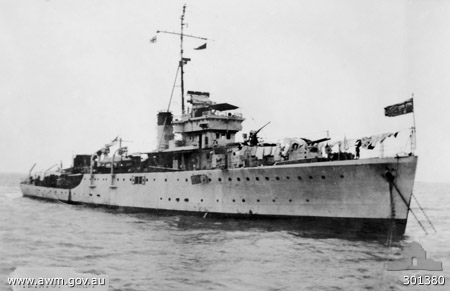
- HMAS Swan in 1945

Class overview
- Builders: Chatham Dockyard; Cockatoo Docks & Engineering Co.; Devonport Dockyard; R. & W. Hawthorn, Leslie & Co.
- Operators: Royal Navy (8); Royal Australian Navy (4); Royal Indian Navy (1)
- Preceded by: Shoreham class
- Succeeded by: Kingfisher class
- Cost: £220,000 for Australian ships
- Built: 1933–1940
- In commission: 1934–1966
- Completed: 13
- Lost: 4
- Preserved: 1

General characteristics RN Ships
- Displacement: RN ships : 990 long tons (1,006 t) standard
- Length: 266 ft 3 in (81.15 m) o/a
- Beam: 36 ft (11.0 m)
- Draught: RN ships : 9 ft 11 in (3.02 m) – 10 ft 1 in (3.07 m)
- Installed power: 2 Admiralty 3-drum boilers; 2,000 shp (1,500 kW)
- Propulsion: 2 shafts; geared steam turbines
- Speed: 16.5 knots (30.6 km/h; 19.0 mph)
- Complement: 100
- Armament: 2 × 4.7 in (120 mm) guns; 1 × QF 3-inch 20 cwt AA gun; 4 × 3-pounder guns; 15–90 depth charges

The Grimsby class were a class of 13 sloops laid down between 1933 and 1940. Of these, eight were built in the United Kingdom for the Royal Navy, four in Australia for the Royal Australian Navy and one for the Royal Indian Navy. Main armament was initially two 4.7-inch (120 mm) guns for RN ships and three 4-inch (100 mm) for Australian ships, but armament varied considerably between ships, and was increased later.

Losses during World War II were Grimsby, Indus, Yarra, and Parramatta. Some survivors of this class served into the 1960s. One ship, Wellington, is preserved as the headquarters of the Honourable Company of Master Mariners.

== Design ==
The Royal Navy started to build replacements for the Flower-class and Hunt-class sloops of the First World War, when the two vessels of the Bridgewater class were laid down in 1928, with the similar four-ship Hastings class laid down in 1929 and the eight ships of the Shoreham class being laid down in 1929–31. All of these ships were designed to combine the convoy-escort role of the Flower class with the minesweeping duties of the Hunt class, being fitted with equipment for both roles. By 1932, however, it became clear that what was needed was ships dedicated to a single role. Development therefore began of the Halcyon-class minesweepers as a cheaper mass-production minesweeper, while a new class of sloops would be built that was more closely matched to the escort role.

The new class of escort sloops, the Grimsby class, had a heavier gun armament than its predecessors, with two 4.7-inch (120 mm) Mark IX guns mounted fore and aft replacing the 4-inch (102 mm) guns of the earlier ships. As the 4.7-inch guns were low-angle guns, not suited to anti aircraft use, a single QF 3-inch 20 cwt anti-aircraft gun was mounted in "B" position. Four 3-pounder saluting guns completed the ships' gun armament. The ship was powered by two geared steam turbines driving two shafts, fed by two Admiralty 3-drum boilers. This machinery produced 2,000 shaft horsepower (1,500 kW) and could propel the ships to a speed of 16.5 knots (30.6 km/h; 19.0 mph).

Eight ships of the class were built for the Royal Navy, being laid down between 1933 and 1935 and completing between 1934 and 1936. The last two ships built for the Royal Navy, HMS Aberdeen and HMS Fleetwood had differing armaments, with Aberdeen replacing the 4.7 and 3-inch guns with two 4-inch anti-aircraft guns, and adding a quadruple .50-inch anti-aircraft machine gun mount, while Fleetwood had a main gun armament of two twin 4-inch anti-aircraft mounts, with a short-range anti-aircraft armament of four .50 in machine guns.

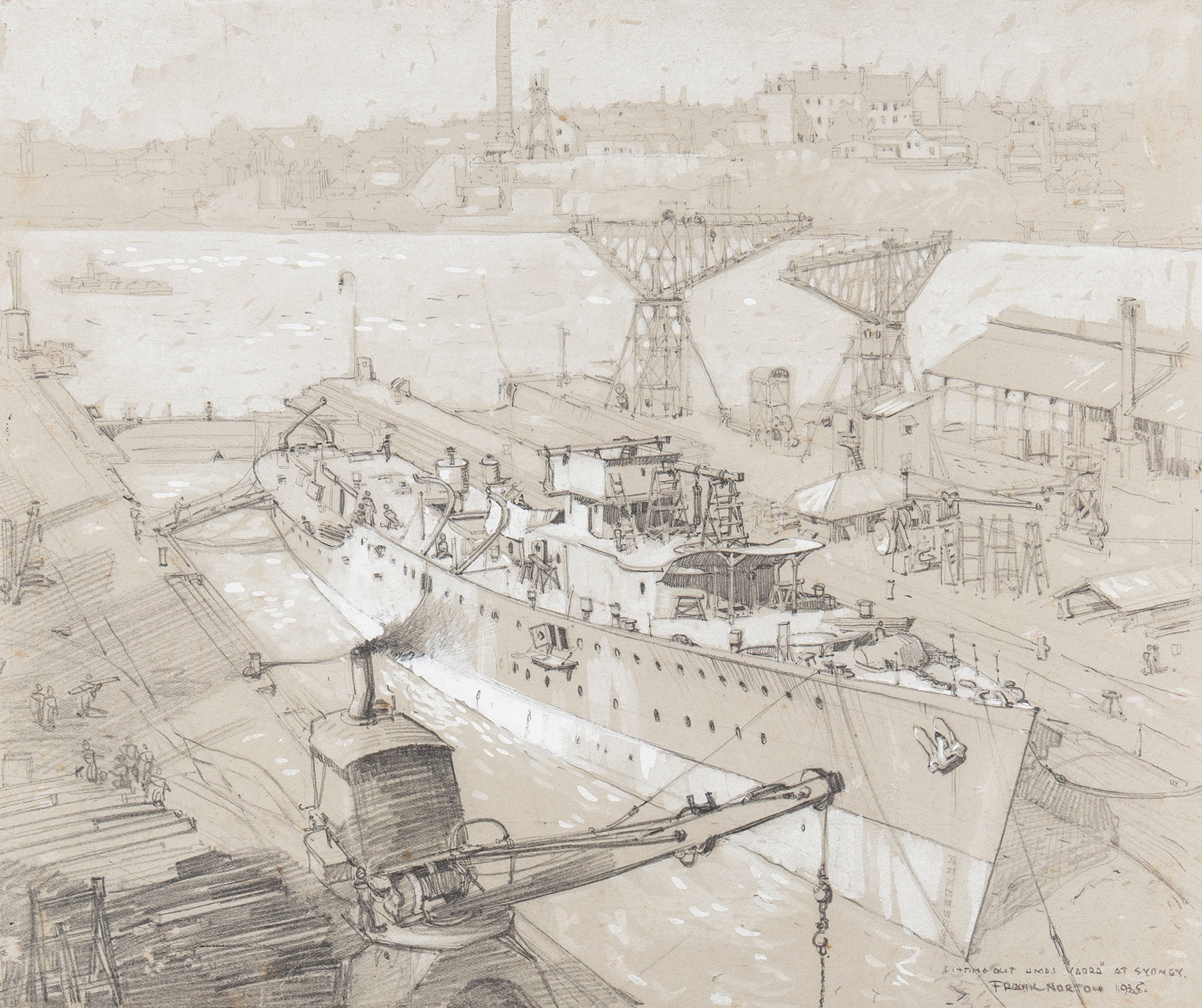
Fitting Out H.M.A.S. Yarra at Sydney (1935) by Frank Norton

The Royal Australian Navy also adopted the Grimsby class, with two ships being laid down in 1934–35 and completed in 1935–36, with two more ships laid down in 1938–39 and completed in 1940. The first two ships were armed with three single 4-inch anti-aircraft guns, while the third and fourth ships having one twin and one-single 4-inch mount, with short-range armament a quadruple machine gun mount in all four ships.

The armament of most of the class was reinforced during the Second World War, with several gaining additional 4-inch guns, with the close in anti aircraft armament being supplemented by the addition of Oerlikon 20 mm cannon. The ships' depth charge complement increased from 15 at the start of the war to 40 for Australian ships and up to 90 for Royal Navy ships, while several ships were also refitted with a Hedgehog anti-submarine projector.

== Ships ==
Name	Builder	Ordered	Laid down	Launched	Commissioned	Fate
Royal Navy
Group 1
Grimsby	HM Dockyard, Devonport	1 November 1932	23 January 1933	19 July 1933	17 May 1934	Sunk in air attack by Italian and German dive bombers off Tobruk, 25 May 1941
Leith	HM Dockyard, Devonport	1 November 1932	6 February 1933	9 September 1933	12 July 1934	Sold into mercantile service, 25 November 1946; Royal Danish Navy survey ship Galathea 1949; Scrapped 1955
Lowestoft	HM Dockyard, Devonport	1 May 1933	21 August 1933	11 April 1934	22 November 1934	Sold into mercantile service, 1946; Scrapped 1955
Wellington	HM Dockyard, Devonport	1 May 1933	25 September 1933	29 May 1934	24 January 1935	Sold to Honourable Company of Master Mariners as Headquarters, 1947
Londonderry	HM Dockyard, Devonport	1 March 1934	11 June 1934	16 January 1935	20 September 1935	Broken up at Llanelly, 1948
Deptford	HM Dockyard, Chatham	1 May 1933	30 April 1934	5 February 1935	20 August 1935	Broken up at Milford Haven, 1948
Group 2
Aberdeen	HM Dockyard, Devonport	1 March 1935	12 June 1935	22 January 1936	17 September 1936	Broken up at Hayle, 1949
Fleetwood	HM Dockyard, Devonport	1 March 1935	14 August 1935	24 March 1936	19 November 1936	Broken up at Gateshead, 1959
Royal Australian Navy
Yarra	Cockatoo Island Dockyard, Sydney	22 December 1933	24 May 1934	28 March 1935	19 December 1935	Sunk in surface action off Java, 4 March 1942
Swan	Cockatoo Island Dockyard, Sydney	2 January 1935	1 May 1935	28 March 1936	10 December 1936	Broken up at Sydney, 1964
Parramatta	Cockatoo Island Dockyard, Sydney	July 1938	9 November 1938	18 June 1939	8 April 1940	Sunk in torpedo attack off Tobruk, 27 November 1941
Warrego	Cockatoo Island Dockyard, Sydney	December 1938	10 May 1939	10 February 1940	21 August 1940	Broken up at Sydney, 1965
Royal Indian Navy
Indus	Hawthorn Leslie and Company, Hebburn	14 August 1933	8 December 1933	24 August 1934	15 March 1935	Sunk in air attack off Akyab, 6 April 1942

== See also ==
- List of corvette and sloop classes of the Royal Navy
- List of Royal Australian Navy ships
