= Shoreham-class sloop =

Class of warships of the Royal Navy built in the 1930s

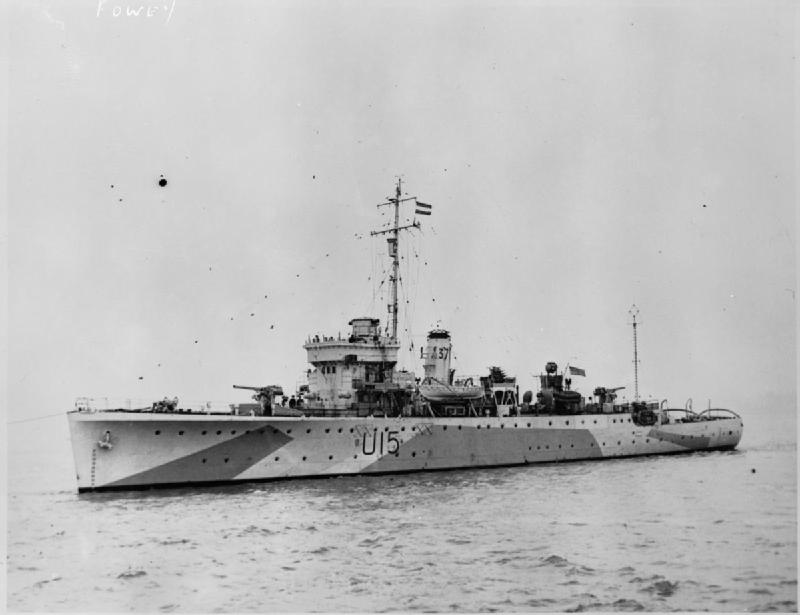
- HMS Fowey in May 1942

Class overview
- Operators: Royal Navy
- Preceded by: Hastings class
- Succeeded by: Grimsby class
- Built: 1930–1932
- In commission: 1931–1968
- Completed: 8

General characteristics
- Displacement: 1,105 long tons (1,123 t)
- Length: 281 ft (86 m)
- Beam: 35 ft (11 m)
- Draught: 8 ft 3 in (2.51 m)
- Propulsion: Geared turbines, 2 shafts, 2,000 shp (1,491 kW)
- Speed: 16 knots (30 km/h; 18 mph)
- Complement: 95
- Armament: 2 × single QF 4 in (100 mm) Mk V guns; 1 × quad 0.5 in (13 mm) anti-aircraft machine guns

The Shoreham-class sloops were a class of eight sloops of the Royal Navy built in the early 1930s. Developed from the Bridgewater class, with a longer hull, the Shoreham class were laid down between 1929 and 1931 at Chatham and Devonport Naval Dockyards.

== Ships ==
- HMS Shoreham (originally L32, from May 1940 U32) was launched on 22 November 1930 at Devonport and sold for scrapping in 1946. From 1932, HMS Shoreham served in the Persian Gulf and, from the outbreak of war, in the Red Sea. She was active in the suppression of the Regia Marina in East Africa, participating in the sinking of the submarine Torricelli. Shoreham was also involved in the invasion of Iran in 1941, where she suppressed Iranian naval ships at Abadan. Apart from a spell in the Mediterranean - including the Allied invasion of Sicily - from February 1943 to September 1943, Shoreham's war was spent with the Eastern Fleet, with which she served up until VJ Day. Shoreham returned to the UK in 1946, sold off in November and broken up in 1950. Her battle honours were Sicily 1943, Mediterranean 1943, Burma 1944-45.
- HMS Fowey was launched on 4 November 1930 and sold for merchant use in 1946. From 1940 to 1942, she was engaged in North Atlantic escort and anti-submarine duty. Fowey participated in the sinking of U-55 on 30 January 1940 and rescued survivors from various sinkings.
- HMS Bideford was launched on 1 April 1931 and scrapped in 1949. After participating in the Dunkirk evacuation (May 1940), she was used in anti-submarine sweeps and as a convoy escort in the North Atlantic. She rescued 63 survivors of the torpedoed MV Edward Blyden on 3 September 1941 and 31 more from the MV Abosso on 31 October 1942. In August 1943, Bideford, with the 40th Escort Group in the Bay of Biscay, was damaged by a Henschel Hs 293 glider bomb.
- HMS Rochester was launched on 16 July 1931, and was operating in the Persian Gulf when war was declared. She returned to England with convoy SL 32 in December 1939. After refit at Humber, she was assigned to the 2nd Escort division in March 1940 patrolling the Western Approaches for the Battle of the Atlantic. On 7 May 1941 she participated in the attack on U-94 while escorting convoy OB 218. She was then assigned to the 37th Escort Group in July after Type 271 radar was installed during refit at Liverpool. She participated in sinking U-204 while escorting convoy HG 74 on 19 October 1941. Rochester was then transferred to the 43rd Escort Group and participated in sinking U-82 while escorting convoy OS 18 on 2 February 1942. After installation of HF/DF and a new air search radar, she participated in sinking U-213 while escorting convoy OS 35 on 30 July 1942. Rochester escorted convoy KMS 2 to the Operation Torch invasion, and escorted convoys between Gibraltar and North Africa until returning to England in February 1943 with convoy MKS 7. She then transferred to the 39th Escort Group and participated in sinking U-135 while escorting convoy OS 51 on 15 July 1943. In May 1944 Rochester sailed to Portsmouth Harbour in preparation for the Invasion of Normandy and remained engaged in English Channel escort duties with the 41st Escort Group until refit in November. The refit completed in March 1945 included modifications for service as the training ship for the Portsmouth Navigation School, HMS Dryad. Rochester served as the navigation training ship until September 1949 and was scrapped in 1951.
- HMS Falmouth was launched on 19 April 1932 and became the RNVR Calliope in 1952. Scrapped in 1968. Falmouth was assigned to the China Station (later merged into the Eastern Fleet) where she was used as the Commander-in-Chief's yacht. In 1936, her new skipper was Frederick "Johnny" Walker who later became a highly successful anti-submarine commander in the Battle of the Atlantic. In June 1940 Falmouth sank the Italian submarine Galvani off the Gulf of Oman. She participated in Operation Countenance, the invasion of Iran, in August 1941. Her role was to transport infantry to Khorramshahr and, with HMAS Yarra, neutralise local Iranian land and sea forces. Her departure from the Shatt al-Arab near Basra was delayed when she ran aground and had to wait for the tide to refloat her.
- HMS Milford was launched on 11 June 1932 and scrapped in 1949. On 28 March 1938, Milford claimed Gough Island in the South Atlantic Ocean for Britain. In the Second World War she was credited with sinking the Vichy French submarine Poncelet off the coast of Gabon, on 7 November 1940, though this was later credited to David Corkhill flying a Supermarine Walrus biplane. On 30 May 1943, she went to the assistance of the freighter Flora McDonald, torpedoed off the coast of West Africa.
- HMS Weston was launched on 23 July 1932 and scrapped in 1947. She spent the war years in home waters and the North Atlantic. On several occasions, she rescued survivors of torpedoed ships and on 31 May 1940, Weston sank U-13 in the North Sea.
- HMS Dundee was launched on 20 September 1932 at Chatham and sunk on 15 September 1940 by U-48, while escorting a convoy.
