= Laertes =

Laertes may refer to:

- Laertes (father of Odysseus), Ionian king and the father of Odysseus in Greek mythology
- Laertes (Hamlet), son of Polonius and brother of Ophelia in Shakespeare's play Hamlet
- Laertes (Cilicia), an ancient town archeological site in Asiatic Turkey
- Laertes prepona, a butterfly in Central and South America
- 11252 Laërtes, a trojan asteroid
- HMS Laertes, three British Royal Navy ships
- USS Laertes, a Xanthus-class repair ship in the U.S. Navy from 1945 to 1972
