= Riesenberg =

Riesenberg may refer to:

== Places ==
- Riesenberg (Ore Mountains), Saxony, Germany
- Prabuty, Northern Poland (German: Riesenberg)
- Riisipere, Estonia (German: Riesenberg)
- A megalithic tomb near Nobbin, on the island of Rügen in Mecklenburg-Vorpommern, Germany

== People ==
- Doug Riesenberg (born 1965), American NFL football player
- Felix Riesenberg (1879–1939), American maritime officer and writer
- Sidney Riesenberg (1885–1971), American illustrator and artist

== Other uses ==
- SS Felix Riesenberg, a 1944 cargo ship
- House of Riesenberg, a West Bohemian noble family; see Hiltpoltstein Castle

== See also ==
- Riedenberg, Bad Kissingen, Bavaria, Germany
- Riesenburg, Pomeranian Voivodeship, Northern Poland
- Reisenberg, Baden, Austria
