= SS West Humhaw =

US Navy auxiliary ship

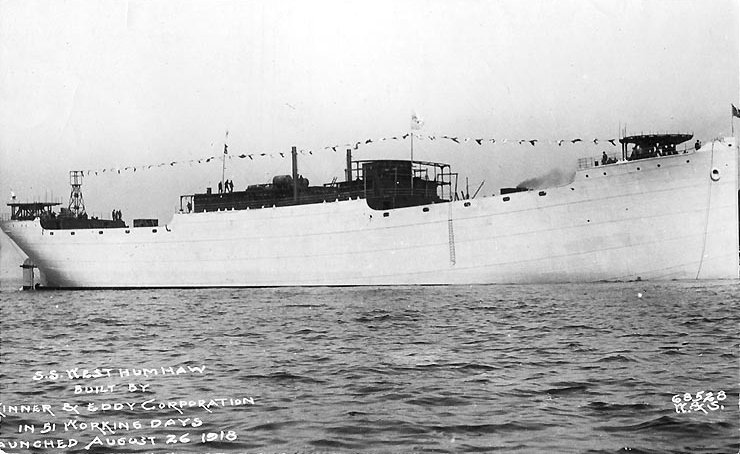
- SS West Humhaw shortly after launch on 28 August 1918 and before the completion of her superstructure.

History
- Name: West Humhaw
- Operator: U.S. Navy 18; U.S. Shipping Board 19; American-West African Line 24
- Builder: Skinner & Eddy
- Yard number: 30 (USSB #1183)
- Laid down: 27 June 1918
- Launched: 28 August 1918
- Acquired: 14 September 1918
- Commissioned: 16 September 1918–27 January 1919
- In service: 16 September 1918–8 November 1942
- Fate: Torpedoed and sunk, 8 November 1942

General characteristics
- Type: Design 1013 cargo ship
- Tonnage: 5,600 GRT; 8,800 DWT
- Displacement: 12,225 tons
- Length: 423 ft 9 in (129.16 m); 410 ft 5 in (125.10 m) bp
- Beam: 54 ft (16 m)
- Draft: 24 ft 2 in (7.37 m)
- Depth of hold: 29 ft 9 in (9.07 m)
- Installed power: 1 × Curtis geared turbine
- Propulsion: Single screw
- Speed: 11.5 kn (21.3 km/h)
- Complement: World War I (USN): 94; Peacetime: about 30; World War II: 54 (38 crew, 16 armed guards)
- Armament: World War I: 1 × 5-inch/51-caliber gun, 1 × 3-inch/50-caliber gun; World War II: 1 × 4-inch gun, 2 × 20 mm AA guns, 2 × .30 cal. machine gun

SS West Humhaw was a steel–hulled cargo ship built in 1918 as part of the United States Shipping Board's emergency World War I shipbuilding program.

The ship was delivered just weeks before the end of the war and immediately commissioned into the U.S. Navy as USS West Humhaw (ID-3718), but completed only one relief mission on the Navy's behalf before decommissioning in January 1919. West Humhaw subsequently operated as a merchant ship, firstly in transatlantic service and later on the trade routes between the U.S. and Africa.

With the outbreak of World War II, West Humhaw participated in a small number of Allied convoys before being sunk by U-161 off Takoradi, Ghana on 8 November 1942.

== Construction and design ==
West Humhaw was built in Seattle, Washington in 1918 at the No. 1 Plant of the Skinner & Eddy Corporation—the 15th in a series of 24 steel–hulled Design 1013 cargo ships built by Skinner & Eddy for the USSB's emergency wartime shipbuilding program. The ship was laid down on 27 June, launched just 51 working (62 calendar) days later on 28 August, and completed on 14 September—a total time under construction of 64 working (79 calendar) days, making West Humhaw one of the fastest-built ships of the war.

West Humhaw had a design deadweight tonnage of 8,800 tons and gross register tonnage of 5,600. The ship had an overall length of 423 feet 9 inches, a beam of 54 feet and a draft of 24 feet 2 inches. She was powered by a Curtis geared turbine driving a single screw propeller, delivering a service speed of 11.5 knots. For wartime service, West Humhaw was armed with one 5"/51 caliber and one 3"/50 caliber gun.

== Service history ==
=== U.S. Navy service, 1918-1919 ===
Immediately on completion, West Humhaw was turned over to the U.S. Navy on 13 September, and commissioned as USS West Humhaw (ID-3718) at the Puget Sound Navy Yard on 16 September for operation with the Naval Overseas Transportation Service (NOTS).

Loading a full cargo of flour for delivery to Europe, West Humhaw departed Seattle on 5 October, bound for the east coast of the United States, transiting the Panama Canal and arriving at New York on the 31st. On 12 November—the day after Armistice Day—West Humhaw departed for La Pallice, France, arriving two weeks later. From La Pallice, the ship sailed on to Bordeaux, where she unloaded her cargo and departed once more for New York on 21 December, arriving on 12 January 1919.

On 27 January, a few days after her return to the U.S., West Humhaw was decommissioned, struck from the Navy List, and returned the same day to the United States Shipping Board.

=== Interwar years ===
Following her decommissioning, West Humhaw was quickly placed into merchant service by the USSB as SS West Humhaw. The vessel's movements in the interwar period are poorly documented, but it appears that the ship was initially placed into transatlantic service. The Ellis Island ship database records that West Humhaw made a number of voyages from 1919 through the early 1920s from various ports in Europe, such as Danzig, Poland; Hamburg, Germany; Plymouth and London, England; and Pauillac, France, to New York.

West Humhaw was eventually turned over to the American-West African Line for operation between the U.S. and Africa. The date of the turnover is not available, but by 1924 West Humhaw was already operating between New York and African destinations such as Nigeria, Liberia, the Cape Verde and Canary Islands, and Côte d'Ivoire. After her turnover to the American-West African Line, the ship would remain under the control of this company for the rest of her career.

=== World War II ===
Following the outbreak of World War II, West Humhaw like most other U.S. merchant ships was fitted with some defensive armament, which in West Humhaw's case included a 4-inch gun, two 20mm antiaircraft guns, and two .30 caliber machine guns. To man the weapons, a group of 16 U.S. Navy armed guards was provided.

With America's entry into the war in December 1941, West Humhaw soon found herself part of the Allied convoy system. In July–August 1942, West Humhaw participated in convoys sailing from Trinidad to New York via Key West, Florida. In September, the ship returned in convoy to Trinidad via Guantanamo Bay, Cuba. From this point the ship appears to have proceeded independently to Freetown, Sierra Leone, on her way to Lagos, Nigeria.

On her way to Freetown, West Humhaw came across a lifeboat on 13 October, containing 18 survivors from another ship of the American-West African Line, John Carter Rose, which had been sunk by U-201 about a week earlier. Eight of the ship's crew had been killed in the attack. West Humhaw rescued the men and took them on to Freetown. The remaining survivors from John Carter Rose were picked up by the Argentinian tanker Santa Cruz and taken to Recife, Brazil.

==== Loss ====
On 4 November 1942, West Humhaw, laden with a cargo of 2000 tons of lubricating oil and 3,915 tons of general cargo, including cable drums and trucks as deck cargo, departed Freetown with a small escorted convoy of three ships, bound for Takoradi, Ghana. At 23:47 hours on 8 November, the convoy was attacked by U-161. U-161 fired four torpedoes, one of which hit and damaged the merchant ship Benalder and another of which struck West Humhaw. Once it became clear the vessel could not be saved, West Humhaw's crew abandoned ship, which sank by the bows in about thirty minutes. Fortunately, there were no deaths in the attack, and the survivors were rescued after about 45 minutes by the Motor Launch HMS ML-281, which transferred them to Takoradi.

== Bibliography ==
- Bunker, John (2006): Heroes in Dungarees: The Story of the American Merchant Marine in World War II, p. 137, Naval Institute Press, ISBN 978-1-59114-099-3.
- Bunker, John (1972): Liberty ships,: The ugly ducklings of World War II, Naval Institute Press.
- Hurley, Edward N. (1920): The New Merchant Marine, p. 93, The Century Co., New York.
- Pacific Ports Inc. (1919): Pacific Ports Annual, Fifth Edition, 1919, pp. 64–65, 402–405, Pacific Ports Inc.
- Silverstone, Paul H. (2006): The New Navy, 1883-1922, Routledge, ISBN 978-0-415-97871-2.
