= Syedra =

Ancient city in Anatolia

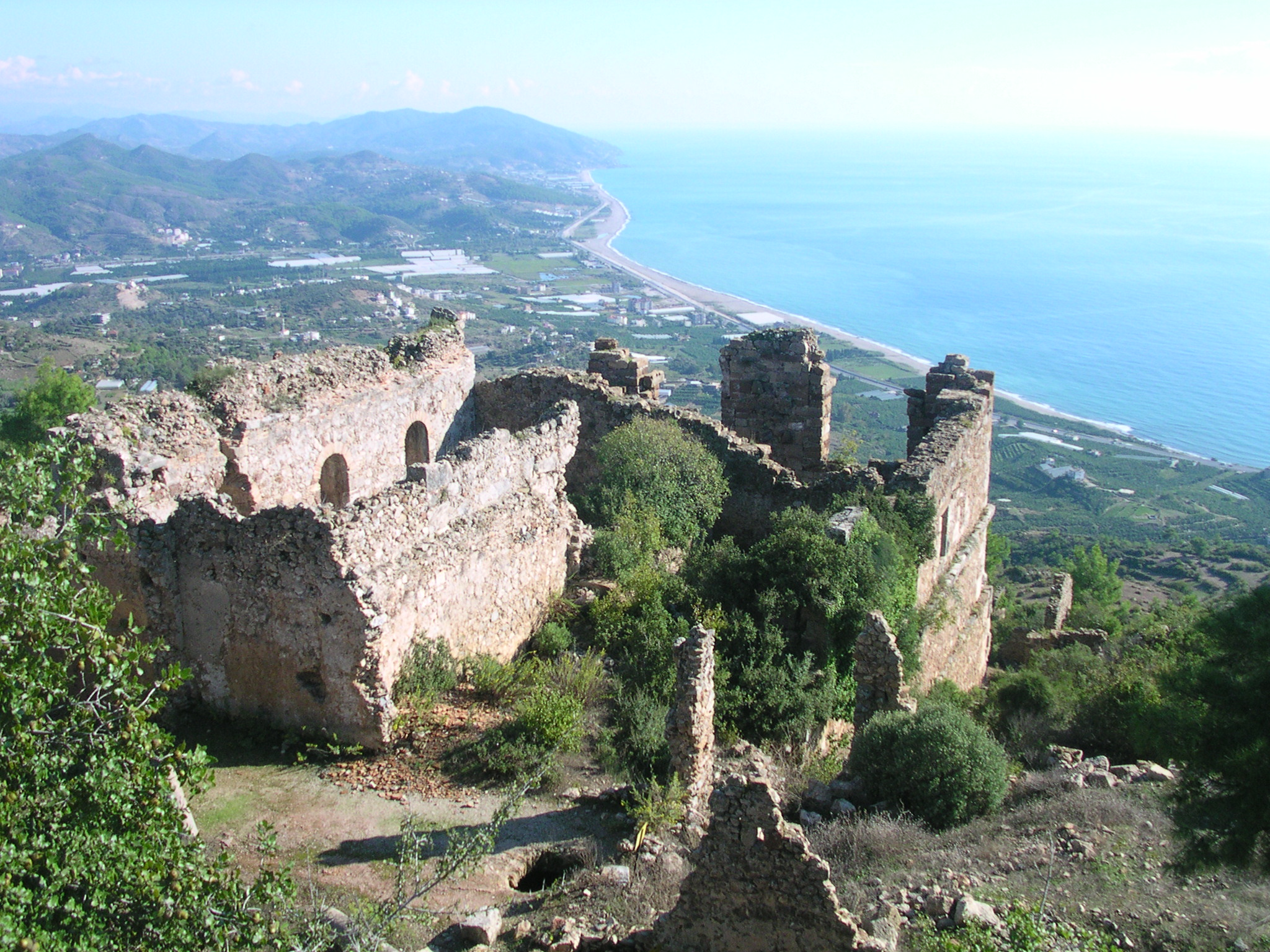
- Ruins of Syedra in 2007

- Location within Turkey
- 36°26′28″N 32°9′9″E
- Type: Settlement
- Cultures: Greek, Roman, Byzantine
- Location: Antalya Province, Turkey
- Region: Cilicia, Pamphylia, Isauria

History
- Built: 7th century BCE
- Abandoned: 13th century CE

Site notes
- Condition: In ruins

Syedra (Greek: Σύεδρα) was an ancient port city in region of ancient Cilicia, Pamphylia, or Isauria, on the southern coast of modern-day Turkey between the towns of Alanya and Gazipaşa. Syedra was settled in the 7th century BCE, and abandoned in the 13th century CE. The town had a port at sea level and an upper town 400m above. Ptolemy places it in Cilicia. Stephanus of Byzantium assigns it to Isauria. Hierocles places it in Pamphylia.

The Roman historians Lucan and Florus both mention Syedra as where the Roman General Pompey held his last war council in 48 BCE, before his fatal voyage to Egypt. The city experienced its height around the 2nd and 3rd centuries CE, and in 194 Roman Emperor Septimius Severus praised the city's resistance of ongoing Mediterranean piracy. A first century BCE inscription found in the town relates to the piracy, suggesting that the oracle, possibly of Apollo at Claros, advised the Syedrians to resist pirates with "violent battle, either driving away, or binding in unbreakable chains." In 193 Pescennius Niger made a war with Septimius Severus in order to become the Emperor. In 194 the war was over and Pescennius Niger defeated. After the war, Septimius Severus rewarded cities that supported him with new privileges and titles, while cities which went against him were punished, lost their privileges, some even became villages (κῶμαι). Syedra supported Septimius Severus, and took privileges.

Coins were minted in Syedra during various time periods going back to that of Roman Emperor Tiberius (r. 14 CE–37 CE). In 374 CE, the early Christian theologian Epiphanius of Salamis wrote his work Ancoratus (the well anchored man) as a reply letter to the Church at Syedra, describing it as needing to be anchored in a safe harbor.

Modern excavations began in 1994 under Dr. İsmail Karamut, then head of the Alanya Archaeological Museum. The main street in the upper town was excavated, as well as a cave decorated with Christian imagery likely used for baptisms. A mosaic found is now on display in the Alanya Museum. Other structures include a temple, a theater, shops, bathhouse, town walls, and several cisterns that provided water to the city. Also many churches have been unearthed. In 2011, archeologist excavating underwater dated relics of a port at Syedra to the Bronze Age, around 5,000 years ago.
