= Barber Steamship Lines =

Passengers and Shipping Company

Barber Steamship Lines and American West African Line
- Industry: Maritime transport
- Founded: 1902
- Defunct: 1978
- Fate: Sold
- Successor: Wilhelmsen Lines
- Headquarters: San Francisco, California (141 Battery Street)
- Area served: Far East and Worldwide
- Services: Cargo and Passengers Liners

Barber Steamship Lines was founded in 1902 as Barber & Company Inc. and also operated the New York & Oriental Steamship Company. In 1928 Barber Steamship Lines operated the American West African Line. In 1945 Barber Steamship Lines was renamed the Wilhelmsen Lines, as it was acquired by Wilh. Wilhelmsen, a Norwegian company, later was renamed again to Barber International. American West African Line was closed in 1946, now part of Barber Steamship Lines. Barber Steamship Lines operated in the Far East and then around the World with Wilh. Wilhelmsen ships. Barber Steamship Lines also operated ships of British James Chambers & Company (1945 to 1955), Norwegian Fearnley & Eger Company and A. F. Klaveness & Co.

== American West African Line ==
During World War II the American West African Line was active with charter shipping with the Maritime Commission and War Shipping Administration. After World War II American West African Line purchased some of the low-cost surplus ships. During wartime, the American West African Line operated Victory ships and Liberty ships.

== Ships ==
- Ship of Barber Steamship Lines and American West African Line:
- Cathlamet
- Challenger
- City of New York
- Otho
- Sagadahoc
- West Cawthon
- West Cusseta
- West Humhaw
- West Irmo, sunk 1942 by U-505.
- West Isleta
- West Kebar
- West Lashaway, sunk by U-66.
- Zarembo
- Stephen Smith
- Wesley W. Barrett
- George Ade
- John Carter Rose
- Jared Ingersoll
- Thomas Stone
- Cedar Rapids Victory
- Coastal Competitor
- Felix Riesenberg
- Belgium Equity
- Radcliffe Victory
- West Kedron
- Empire Gazelle
- Taos Victory
- Westbrook Victory
- Westerly Victory
- Zanesville Victory
- Drury Victory
- Escanaba Victor
- Richard Bland
- Richard D. Spaight
- Harvard Victory
- Felix Riesenberg
- Frank Adair Monroe
- Benjamin H. Bristow
- Bushrod Washington
- James A. Farrell
- James K. Polk
- James M. Goodhue
- Jared Ingersoll
- Jeremiah M. Daily
- Jeremiah Wadsworth
- Thomas Hooker
- Vernon L. Parrington
- John R. McQuigg
- Edward L. Grant
- Julia Ward Howe
- Oakley Wood
- Arthur P. Davis
- Matt W. Ransom
- West Nohno
- Empire Eland
- Bigorange XVIII
- Danae
- Franconia
- Talnati
- Tamesis
- Taronga
- Tender
- Champion
- Themis
- Tourcoing
- Tønsberg
- Taiko
- Tricolor
- Tampa
