= SS Fairport (1941) =

World War II American cargo ship

History
- Name: Fairport
- Owner: Waterman Steamship Company
- Port of registry: (United States) Mobile, Alabama
- Builder: Gulf Shipbuilding; Chickasaw, Alabama
- Yard number: 1
- Launched: 15 November 1941
- Completed: April 1942
- Fate: Sunk, 16 July 1942

General characteristics
- Type: Type C2-S-E1 ship
- Tonnage: 6,165 GRT
- Length: 445 ft 0 in (135.64 m)
- Beam: 63 ft 0 in (19.20 m)
- Draft: 31 ft 2 in (9.50 m)
- Propulsion: 2 steam turbines, geared to a single screw propeller
- Speed: 15.5 knots (28.7 km/h)
- Crew: 10 officers, 33 men, 14 Naval Armed Guardsmen
- Armament: 1 × 4 in (100 mm) gun; 4 × .50 cal (12.7 mm) machine gun; 2 × .30 cal (7.62 mm) machine gun

SS Fairport was a Type C2-S-E1 cargo ship built by Gulf Shipbuilding for the Waterman Steamship Company. She was sunk by U-161 on 16 July 1942. All hands were rescued by an American destroyer.

== Career ==
Fairport was laid down as the first ship constructed at Gulf Shipbuilding of Chickasaw, Alabama. Constructed under a United States Maritime Commission contract (MC hull number 849) on behalf of the Waterman Steamship Company of Mobile, Alabama, she was launched on 15 November 1941. After Fairport's April 1942 completion, she was registered at Mobile and armed with a 4-inch (100 mm) deck gun and six machine guns, and took on fourteen Naval Armed Guardsmen to man the guns.

On 13 July 1942, Fairport departed New York with convoy WS 4 for the Persian Gulf. She was carrying a cargo of 8,000 long tons (8,128.375 t) of materiel which included a deck load of tanks, (fifty-two tanks, eighteen self-propelled guns and other supplies) and also carried 66 passengers. The convoy consisted of six other merchant ships and an escort of three destroyers; Fairport's station in the convoy was in position #12, the second ship in the port column.

At 09:45 on 16 July, near position 27°10′N 64°33′W or about 500 nautical miles (930 km) northwest of the Virgin Islands, Fairport was struck by two torpedoes launched by Korvettenkapitän Albrecht Achilles, the commander of U-161. The first torpedo struck the cargo ship's #4 cargo hold on the port side, starting a fire that was quickly extinguished by inrushing seawater. The second torpedo struck ten seconds after the first, and opened a 30-by-25-foot (9.1 by 7.6 m) hole near the #1 hold. The engines were secured and the vessel ordered abandoned five minutes later. Fifteen minutes after the attack, Fairport sank by the stern. All 123 persons aboard the ship (10 officers, 33 men, 14 Naval Armed Guardsmen, 66 passengers) were rescued by destroyer Kearny, and landed at New York on 21 July.
