= SS John Carter Rose =

Liberty ship of WWII

History

United States
- Name: John Carter Rose
- Namesake: John Carter Rose
- Owner: War Shipping Administration (WSA)
- Operator: American West African Line, Inc.
- Ordered: as type (EC2-S-C1) hull, MCE hull 56
- Awarded: 14 March 1941
- Builder: Bethlehem-Fairfield Shipyard, Baltimore, Maryland
- Cost: $1,084,000
- Yard number: 2043
- Way number: 4
- Laid down: 10 June 1942
- Launched: 31 July 1942
- Sponsored by: Mrs. Harry B. Kreisher
- Completed: 10 August 1942
- Identification: Call sign: KGFZ
- Fate: Sunk, 8 October 1942

General characteristics
- Class & type: Liberty ship; type EC2-S-C1, standard
- Tonnage: 10,865 LT DWT; 7,176 GRT
- Displacement: 3,380 long tons (3,434 t) (light); 14,245 long tons (14,474 t) (max)
- Length: 441 feet 6 inches (135 m) oa; 416 feet (127 m) pp; 427 feet (130 m) lwl
- Beam: 57 feet (17 m)
- Draft: 27 ft 9.25 in (8.4646 m)
- Installed power: 2 × Oil fired 450 °F (232 °C) boilers, operating at 220 psi (1,500 kPa); 2,500 hp (1,900 kW)
- Propulsion: 1 × triple-expansion steam engine, (manufactured by Filer and Stowell, Milwaukee, Wisconsin); 1 × screw propeller
- Speed: 11.5 knots (21.3 km/h; 13.2 mph)
- Capacity: 562,608 cubic feet (15,931 m^{3}) (grain); 499,573 cubic feet (14,146 m^{3}) (bale)
- Complement: 38–62 USMM; 21–40 USNAG
- Armament: Varied by ship; Bow-mounted 3-inch (76 mm)/50-caliber gun; Stern-mounted 4-inch (102 mm)/50-caliber gun; 2–8 × single 20-millimeter (0.79 in) Oerlikon anti-aircraft (AA) cannons and/or, 2–8 × 37-millimeter (1.46 in) M1 AA guns

SS John Carter Rose was a Liberty ship built in the United States during World War II. She was named after John Carter Rose, a United States circuit judge of the United States Court of Appeals for the Fourth Circuit who was previously a United States District Judge of the United States District Court for the District of Maryland.

== Construction ==
John Carter Rose was laid down on 10 June 1942, under a Maritime Commission (MARCOM) contract, MCE hull 56, by the Bethlehem-Fairfield Shipyard, Baltimore, Maryland; she was sponsored by Mrs. Harry B. Kreisher, the wife of a yard employee, and was launched on 31 July 1942.

== History ==
She was allocated to American West African Line, Inc., on 10 August 1942.

=== Sinking ===
John Carter Rose had dispersed from Convoy TRIN-15 on 4 October 1942, during her maiden voyage. She carried 7,979 long tons (8,107 t) of gasoline, in 26,000 drums, along with food, piping, tires, and trucks. On 6 October, about 620 mi (1,000 km) east of Trinidad, she was spotted, unescorted, by German submarine U-201, at 16:04. A few hours later she was also spotted by U-202, which along with U-201, began to chase John Carter Rose east.

U-201 fired at John Carter Rose at 00:06 on 7 October, from her stern torpedo tube. U-201 was forced to dive after the torpedo she fired was either a dud, or missed, and John Carter Rose opened up with her stern 4-inch (100 mm)/50 caliber gun, firing four shots. Turning away and setting her speed to maximum, 12 kn (22 km/h; 14 mph), John Carter Rose unknowingly turned towards U-202, which at 00:29 fired a spread of three torpedoes at her. Hearing two detonation, but not observing any effect on John Carter Rose, at 00:35, U-202 fired her stern torpedo, which missed the zigzagging ship. John Carter Rose again opened up with her 4-inch gun, forcing U-202 to crash dive.

At 13:38, on 7 October, U-201 was able to again make contact with John Carter Rose. At 23:58 U-201 fired a two torpedo spread which again missed. At 02:32, on 8 October, after 32 hours, 290 mi (470 km), and seven torpedoes missing her, John Carter Rose was struck between the #2 and #3 holds by U-201. The explosion immediately ignited her cargo of gasoline and blew the hatch covers off. It took 20 minutes to stop the engines so the crew could abandon ship. Eight officers, 28 crewmen, and 17 Armed guards were able to escape in three lifeboats, three Armed guards and five crewmen died. U-201 fired another torpedo at the burning ship at 06:06, and then opened fire with her deck mounted 8.8-centimeter (3.5 in) naval gun at 11:00. Less than an hour later John Carter Rose sank at 10°27′N 45°37′W by the bow after having 51 8.8-cm rounds fired into her.

The survivors were questioned by the German crew which gave them cigarettes, bread, first aid, and directions to Venezuela. The U-boat crew also rescued one man from the water and transferred him to one of the lifeboats. On 13 October 1942, after the lifeboats had become separated, the merchant ship West Humhaw picked up 18 survivors from one lifeboat at 18:00. The Argentinean tanker Santa Cruz picked up the remaining 35 survivors the same day.

== Bibliography ==
- "Bethlehem-Fairfield, Baltimore MD". www.ShipbuildingHistory.com. 14 August 2008.
- Maritime Administration. "John Carter Rose". Ship History Database Vessel Status Card. U.S. Department of Transportation, Maritime Administration.
- Davies, James (May 2004). "Specifications (As-Built)" (PDF). p. 23.
- "SS John Carter Rose".
- "John Carter Rose".
