= German submarine U-161 (1941) =

German World War II submarine

Coordinates: 12°30′S 35°35′W

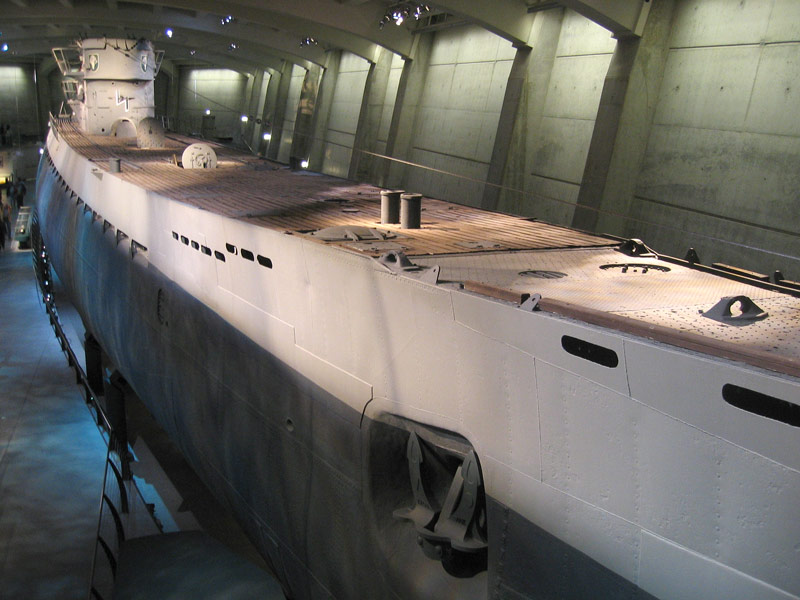
- U-505, a typical Type IXC boat

History

Nazi Germany
- Name: U-161
- Ordered: 25 September 1939
- Builder: Deutsche Schiff und Maschinenbau AG, Bremen
- Yard number: 700
- Laid down: 23 March 1940
- Launched: 1 March 1941
- Commissioned: 8 July 1941
- Fate: Sunk on 27 September 1943

General characteristics
- Class & type: Type IXC submarine
- Displacement: 1,120 t (1,100 long tons) surfaced; 1,232 t (1,213 long tons) submerged
- Length: 76.76 m (251 ft 10 in) o/a; 58.75 m (192 ft 9 in) pressure hull
- Beam: 6.76 m (22 ft 2 in) o/a; 4.40 m (14 ft 5 in) pressure hull
- Height: 9.60 m (31 ft 6 in)
- Draught: 4.70 m (15 ft 5 in)
- Installed power: 4,400 PS (3,200 kW; 4,300 bhp) (diesels); 1,000 PS (740 kW; 990 shp) (electric)
- Propulsion: 2 shafts; 2 × diesel engines; 2 × electric motors
- Speed: 18.3 knots (33.9 km/h; 21.1 mph) surfaced; 7.3 knots (13.5 km/h; 8.4 mph) submerged
- Range: 13,450 nmi (24,910 km; 15,480 mi) at 10 knots (19 km/h; 12 mph) surfaced; 64 nmi (119 km; 74 mi) at 4 knots (7.4 km/h; 4.6 mph) submerged
- Test depth: 230 m (750 ft)
- Complement: 4 officers, 44 enlisted
- Armament: 6 × torpedo tubes (4 bow, 2 stern); 22 × 53.3 cm (21 in) torpedoes; 1 × 10.5 cm (4.1 in) SK C/32 deck gun (180 rounds); 1 × 3.7 cm (1.5 in) SK C/30 AA gun; 1 × twin 2 cm FlaK 30 AA guns

Service record
- Part of: 4th U-boat Flotilla; 8 July – 31 December 1941; 2nd U-boat Flotilla; 1 January 1942 – 27 September 1943
- Identification codes: M 46 894
- Commanders: Kptlt. Hans-Ludwig Witt; 8 July – 31 December 1941; Kptlt. Albrecht Achilles; 1 January 1942 – 27 September 1943
- Operations: 6 patrols: 1st patrol: 3 – 15 January 1942; 2nd patrol: 24 January – 2 April 1942; 3rd patrol: 28 April – 7 August 1942; 4th patrol: 19 September 1942 – 9 January 1943; 5th patrol: 13 March – 7 June 1943; 6th patrol: 8 August – 27 September 1943
- Victories: 12 merchant ships sunk (60,107 GRT); 1 warship sunk (1,130 tons); 1 merchant ship total loss (3,305 GRT); 5 merchant ships damaged (35,672 GRT); 1 warship damaged (5,450 tons)

German submarine U-161 was a Type IXC U-boat of Nazi Germany's Kriegsmarine built for service during World War II. The keel for this boat was laid down on 23 March 1940 at the Deutsche Schiff und Maschinenbau AG, Bremen yard as yard number 700. She was launched on 1 March 1941 and commissioned on 8 July under the command of Kapitänleutnant Hans-Ludwig Witt (Knight's Cross).

The U-boat's service began with training as part of the 4th U-boat Flotilla. She then moved to the 10th flotilla on 1 January 1942 for operations. She sank 12 ships, totalling 60,107 gross register tons (GRT); one warship of 1,130 tons and damaged five others, for 35,672 GRT. She also damaged one warship (5,450 tons) and caused one merchant vessel to be declared a total loss (3,305 GRT).

She was sunk by an American aircraft on 27 September 1943.

== Design ==
German Type IXC submarines were slightly larger than the original Type IXBs. U-161 had a displacement of 1,120 tonnes (1,100 long tons) when at the surface and 1,232 tonnes (1,213 long tons) while submerged. The U-boat had a total length of 76.76 m (251 ft 10 in), a pressure hull length of 58.75 m (192 ft 9 in), a beam of 6.76 m (22 ft 2 in), a height of 9.60 m (31 ft 6 in), and a draught of 4.70 m (15 ft 5 in). The submarine was powered by two MAN M 9 V 40/46 supercharged four-stroke, nine-cylinder diesel engines producing a total of 4,400 metric horsepower (3,240 kW; 4,340 shp) for use while surfaced, two Siemens-Schuckert 2 GU 345/34 double-acting electric motors producing a total of 1,000 metric horsepower (740 kW; 990 shp) for use while submerged. She had two shafts and two 1.92 m (6 ft) propellers. The boat was capable of operating at depths of up to 230 metres (750 ft).

The submarine had a maximum surface speed of 18.3 knots (33.9 km/h; 21.1 mph) and a maximum submerged speed of 7.3 knots (13.5 km/h; 8.4 mph). When submerged, the boat could operate for 63 nautical miles (117 km; 72 mi) at 4 knots (7.4 km/h; 4.6 mph); when surfaced, she could travel 13,450 nautical miles (24,910 km; 15,480 mi) at 10 knots (19 km/h; 12 mph). U-161 was fitted with six 53.3 cm (21 in) torpedo tubes (four fitted at the bow and two at the stern), 22 torpedoes, one 10.5 cm (4.13 in) SK C/32 naval gun, 180 rounds, and a 3.7 cm (1.5 in) SK C/30 as well as a 2 cm (0.79 in) C/30 anti-aircraft gun. The boat had a complement of forty-eight.

== Service history ==
=== First and second patrols ===
The submarine's first patrol took her from Kiel on 3 January 1942, across the North Sea and into the Atlantic Ocean through the gap between the Faroe and Shetland Islands. She arrived at Lorient, in occupied France, on 3 May. She would be based at this Atlantic port for the rest of her career.

U-161's second sortie proved to be successful, damaging British Consul and Mokihana on 19 February 1942 while the ships rode at anchor in the Gulf of Paria off Port of Spain, Trinidad. She went on to sink ships such as Circe Shell, Lihue the petrol tanker Uniwaleco off St Vincent.

Then, daringly, she made her way at night through the narrow passage into Castries Harbour, St Lucia where she damaged the Lady Nelson and Umtata. One ship sunk by U-161, Sarniadoc, sank in 30 seconds after her boiler exploded. There were no survivors. On 15 March 1942, while en route alone from Curaçao, Netherlands West Indies to Antigua, British West Indies, the Speedwell-class USCGC Acacia, (formerly the U.S. Army mine planter General John P. Story transferred to the United States Lighthouse Service at no cost in 1922,) was sunk by gunfire from U-161 approximately 150 miles south of Port-au-Prince, Haiti. The entire crew of Acacia abandoned ship before she sank and all were rescued unscathed. She was the only U.S. tender sunk by enemy action during the war in the Caribbean.

=== Third patrol ===
The boat's third patrol took her past the Azores and Cape Verde Islands, to the Brazilian coast north of Fortaleza. She then followed that coastline north until she reached the Caribbean. On 16 June 1942 she stopped the sailing ship Neuva Altagracia with gunfire and sank the vessel with scuttling charges. She also attacked San Pablo while the ship was being unloaded in Puerto Limón, Costa Rica on 3 July. Although the ship sank, she was raised with the intention of repair; but she was declared a total loss and sunk as a target on 25 September.

She crossed the Atlantic in an easterly direction, but turned about and returned to the Caribbean. Having commenced the return leg to France, she encountered Fairport 500 nmi (930 km; 580 mi) north of St. Thomas, Virgin Islands on 16 July and sank her. The boat returned to Lorient on 7 August.

=== Fourth patrol ===
Her fourth foray was to west Africa. This patrol was her longest-113 days. She damaged the light cruiser HMS Phoebe six miles and 282° from Pointe Noire, French Equatorial Africa on 23 October 1942 and sank the West Humhaw 60 nmi (110 km; 69 mi) southwest of Takoradi in Ghana on 8 November.

=== Fifth patrol ===
The boat's fifth patrol involved another Atlantic crossing and sinking a second sailing ship, Angelus, north of Bermuda, again with gunfire. Ten survivors abandoned the vessel; only two were still alive when their lifeboat was discovered.

=== Sixth patrol and loss ===
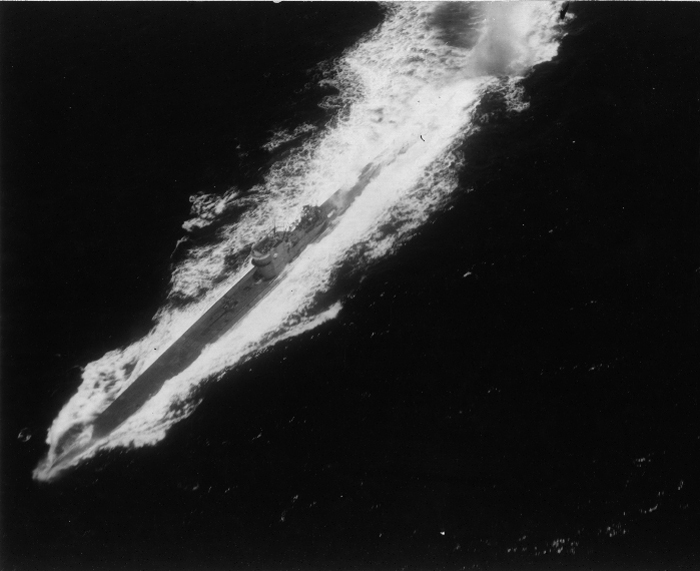
Aerial attack on U-161 by a PBM-Mariner of VP-74 on 27 September 1943.

The U-boat departed Lorient for the last time on 8 August 1943. She rendezvoused with the Japanese submarine I-8 on 20 August to transfer two radio technicians and a Metox radar detector for installation on the Japanese submarine. Returning to the Brazilian coast, she sank St. Usk on 20 September and Itapagé on the 26th. She was sunk with all hands (53 men), on 27 September 1943 by an American PBM Mariner aircraft of VP-74 in the South Atlantic.

== Summary of raiding history ==
| Date | Name | Nationality | Tonnage (Note: Merchant ship tonnages are in gross register tons. Military vessels are listed by tons displacement.) | Fate |
|---|---|---|---|---|
| 19 February 1942 | British Consul | United Kingdom | 6,940 | Damaged |
| 19 February 1942 | Mokihana | United States | 7,460 | Damaged |
| 21 February 1942 | Circe Shell | United Kingdom | 8,207 | Sunk |
| 23 February 1942 | Lihue | United States | 7,001 | Sunk |
| 7 March 1942 | Uniwaleco | South Africa | 9,755 | Sunk |
| 10 March 1942 | RMS Lady Nelson | Canada | 7,970 | Damaged |
| 10 March 1942 | Umtata | United Kingdom | 8,141 | Damaged |
| 14 March 1942 | Sarniadoc | Canada | 1,940 | Sunk |
| 15 March 1942 | USCGC Acacia | United States Coast Guard | 1,130 | Sunk |
| 16 June 1942 | Nueva Altagracia | Dominican Republic | 30 | Sunk |
| 3 July 1942 | San Pablo | Panama | 3,305 | Total loss |
| 16 July 1942 | Fairport | United States | 6,165 | Sunk |
| 23 October 1942 | HMS Phoebe | Royal Navy | 5,450 | Damaged |
| 8 November 1942 | Benalder | United Kingdom | 5,161 | Damaged |
| 8 November 1942 | West Humhaw | United States | 5,527 | Sunk |
| 29 November 1942 | Tjileboet | Netherlands | 5,760 | Sunk |
| 12 December 1942 | Ripley | United Kingdom | 4,997 | Sunk |
| 19 May 1943 | Angelus | Canada | 255 | Sunk |
| 20 September 1943 | St. Usk | United Kingdom | 5,472 | Sunk |
| 26 September 1943 | Itapagé | Brazil | 4,998 | Sunk |

== Bibliography ==
- Busch, Rainer; Röll, Hans-Joachim (1999). German U-boat commanders of World War II : a biographical dictionary. Translated by Brooks, Geoffrey. London, Annapolis, Md: Greenhill Books, Naval Institute Press. ISBN 1-55750-186-6.
- Busch, Rainer; Röll, Hans-Joachim (1999). Deutsche U-Boot-Verluste von September 1939 bis Mai 1945 [German U-boat losses from September 1939 to May 1945]. Der U-Boot-Krieg (in German). Vol. IV. Hamburg, Berlin, Bonn: Mittler. ISBN 3-8132-0514-2.
- Gröner, Erich; Jung, Dieter; Maass, Martin (1991). U-boats and Mine Warfare Vessels. German Warships 1815–1945. Vol. 2. Translated by Thomas, Keith; Magowan, Rachel. London: Conway Maritime Press. ISBN 0-85177-593-4.
- Grover, David (1987). U.S. Army Ships and Watercraft of World War II. Naval Institute Press. ISBN 0-87021-766-6. LCCN 87015514.
- Kemp, Paul (1999). U-Boats Destroyed – German Submarine Losses in the World Wars. London: Arms & Armour. ISBN 1-85409-515-3.
