= SS Wesley W. Barrett =

Liberty ship of WWII

History

United States
- Name: Wesley W. Barrett
- Namesake: Wesley W. Barrett
- Owner: War Shipping Administration (WSA)
- Operator: American West African Line Inc.
- Ordered: as type (EC2-S-C5) hull, MC hull 2345
- Builder: J.A. Jones Construction, Panama City, Florida
- Cost: $1,017,340
- Yard number: 86
- Way number: 2
- Laid down: 29 January 1945
- Launched: 7 March 1945
- Completed: 21 March 1945
- Identification: Call sign: ANQD
- Fate: Transferred to the, Beaumont Reserve Fleet, Beaumont, Texas, 18 September 1947; Sold for scrapping, 22 September 1964, removed from fleet, 8 February 1965

General characteristics
- Class & type: Liberty ship; type EC2-S-C5, boxed aircraft transport
- Tonnage: 10,600 LT DWT; 7,200 GRT
- Displacement: 3,380 long tons (3,434 t) (light); 14,245 long tons (14,474 t) (max)
- Length: 441 feet 6 inches (135 m) oa; 416 feet (127 m) pp; 427 feet (130 m) lwl
- Beam: 57 feet (17 m)
- Draft: 27 ft 9.25 in (8.4646 m)
- Installed power: 2 × Oil fired 450 °F (232 °C) boilers, operating at 220 psi (1,500 kPa); 2,500 hp (1,900 kW)
- Propulsion: 1 × triple-expansion steam engine, (manufactured by Joshua Hendy Iron Works, Sunnyvale, California); 1 × screw propeller
- Speed: 11.5 knots (21.3 km/h; 13.2 mph)
- Capacity: 490,000 cubic feet (13,875 m^{3}) (bale)
- Complement: 38–62 USMM; 21–40 USNAG
- Armament: Varied by ship; Bow-mounted 3-inch (76 mm)/50-caliber gun; Stern-mounted 4-inch (102 mm)/50-caliber gun; 2–8 × single 20-millimeter (0.79 in) Oerlikon anti-aircraft (AA) cannons and/or, 2–8 × 37-millimeter (1.46 in) M1 AA guns

SS Wesley W. Barrett was a Liberty ship built in the United States during World War II. She was named after Wesley W. Barrett.

== Construction ==
Wesley W. Barrett was laid down on 29 January 1945, under a Maritime Commission (MARCOM) contract, MC hull 2342, by J.A. Jones Construction, Panama City, Florida; she was launched on 7 March 1945.

== History ==
She was allocated to American West African Line Inc., on 21 March 1945. After a number of contracts, on 18 September 1947, she was laid up in the Beaumont Reserve Fleet, Beaumont, Texas. She was sold for scrapping, 22 September 1964, to Pinto Island Metals Co., for $49,666.88. She was withdrawn from the fleet, 8 February 1965.

== Bibliography ==
- "Jones Construction, Panama City FL". www.ShipbuildingHistory.com. 13 October 2010.
- Maritime Administration. "Wesley W. Barrett". Ship History Database Vessel Status Card. U.S. Department of Transportation, Maritime Administration.
- Davies, James (May 2004). "Specifications (As-Built)" (PDF). p. 23.
- "SS Wesley W. Barrett".
