= SS Cedar Rapids Victory =

United States Merchant Marine ship

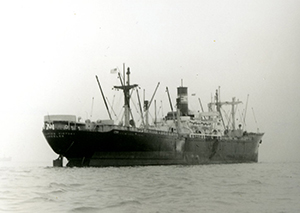
- The livestock ship SS Cedar Rapids Victory

History

United States
- Name: SS Cedar Rapids Victory
- Owner: War Shipping Administration`
- Operator: American West African Line
- Builder: California Shipbuilding Company, Los Angeles
- Laid down: November 25, 1944
- Launched: January 14, 1945
- Completed: February 17, 1945
- Identification: IMO number: 5066748
- Fate: Scrapped, 1985

General characteristics
- Class & type: VC2-S-AP3 Victory ship
- Tonnage: 7612 GRT, 4,553 NRT
- Displacement: 15,200 tons
- Length: 455 ft (139 m)
- Beam: 62 ft (19 m)
- Draught: 28 ft (8.5 m)
- Installed power: 8,500 shp (6,300 kW)
- Propulsion: HP & LP turbines geared to a single 20.5-foot (6.2 m) propeller
- Speed: 16.5 knots
- Boats & landing craft carried: 4 Lifeboats
- Complement: 62 Merchant Marine and 28 US Naval Armed Guards
- Armament: 1 × 5 inch (127 mm)/38 caliber gun; 1 × 3 inch (76 mm)/50 caliber gun; 8 × 20 mm Oerlikon

SS Cedar Rapids Victory was the 77th Victory ship built during World War II under the Emergency Shipbuilding program. She was launched by the California Shipbuilding Company on January 14, 1945, and completed on February 17, 1945. The ship's United States Maritime Commission designation was VC2-S-AP3 and her hull number was 77. Her operator was the American West African Line.

Cedar Rapids was one of the new 10,500-short-ton-class (9,500-tonne; 9,400-long-ton) ships known as Victory ships. They were designed to replace the earlier, smaller Liberty ships, which were designed to only be used for the duration of the war. Victory ships were faster, taller, longer and wider, had a thinner stack set farther toward the superstructure and had a long raised forecastle; they were built to last longer and serve after the war.

== World War II ==
She served as cargo transport in the Pacific Theater of World War II. She took supplies to the troops during the Battle of Okinawa in 1945. During the battle, she used her deck guns to defend herself and other ships against kamikaze attacks from airplanes. From May 19, 1945, to June 6, 1945, she was under heavy attack.

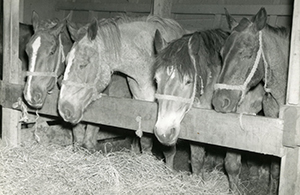
Horses on board SS Cedar Rapids Victory

== War relief and sea cowboys ==
From 1945 to 1947 the United Nations Relief and Rehabilitation Administration and the Brethren Service Committee of the Church of the Brethren sent livestock to war-torn countries using Victory ships. The 73 ships, known as "seagoing cowboys", made about 360 trips. Cedar Rapids Victory was one of these ships; she transported livestock across the Atlantic Ocean. In 1942, the Church of the Brethren started the Heifers for Relief project; this became Heifer International in 1953.

Cedar Rapids Victory departed Newport, Rhode Island, on July 10, 1946, and sailed to Trieste, Italy, with livestock for delivery to Yugoslavia. She continued to Poland on August 30, 1946. The ship moved horses, heifers and mules, as well as a few chicks, rabbits and goats. In November 1946 she delivered livestock to Kalamata, Greece. Cedar Rapids Victory took 750 wild horses from the plains of The Dakotas to Bremen, Germany, up the Weser River, departing on September 26, 1946, from Newport News, Virginia. The horses filled the cargo holds and a few were put on the main deck. Each cowboy was assigned 35 horses to feed, water and take care of during the trip. She ran into a tropical hurricane; the sailing was rough, but she made it to Germany. Cedar Rapids Victory was sailing with livestock from Buenos Aires, Argentina, on December 16, 1948, and delivered the livestock to Gothenburg, Sweden, on January 20, 1949. Returning to the U.S., Cedar Rapids Victory went adrift on February 11, 1948, beyond the Arctic Circle off Norway's northwest coast. Her propeller shaft was broken, so a salvage company was sent to tow her. The salvage company Norsk Bjergningskompani sent SS Achilles to the find Cedar Rapids Victory. Achilles was expected to reach her on February 12, 1948. She was found at a longitude of 67 degrees and 49 minutes north and a latitude of 14 degrees and 20 minutes east in the Vestfjorden sea, 6 miles off of the coast of Norway.

In 1948 she was stored in Wilmington, North Carolina, and later transferred to Beaumont, Texas, as part of the National Defense Reserve Fleet. She was scrapped in 1985 at Brownsville, Texas.

== Honors ==
The crew of the Navy Armed Guard on the SS Cedar Rapids earned Battle Stars in World War II for action during the assault on Okinawa from May 19, 1945, to June 6, 1945.

== See also ==
- Liberty ship
- List of Victory ships
- Type C1 ship
- Type C2 ship
- Type C3 ship

== Sources ==
- Sawyer, L.A. and W.H. Mitchell. Victory ships and tankers: The history of the ‘Victory’ type cargo ships and of the tankers built in the United States of America during World War II, Cornell Maritime Press, 1974, 0-87033-182-5.
- United States Maritime Commission:
- Victory Cargo Ships
