= SS Thomas Stone =

Liberty ship of WWII

History

United States
- Name: Thomas Stone
- Namesake: Thomas Stone
- Owner: War Shipping Administration (WSA)
- Operator: American West African Line Inc.
- Ordered: as type (EC2-S-C1) hull, MCE hull 27
- Awarded: 14 March 1941
- Builder: Bethlehem-Fairfield Shipyard, Baltimore, Maryland
- Cost: $1,147,240
- Yard number: 2014
- Way number: 13
- Laid down: 20 October 1941
- Launched: 12 April 1942
- Completed: 16 May 1942
- Identification: Call sign: KEWS
- Fate: Laid up in the Hudson River Reserve Fleet, Jones Point, New York, 30 December 1947; Laid up in the James River Reserve Fleet, Lee Hall, Virginia, 11 June 1952; Sold for scrapping, 13 April 1971, withdrawn from fleet, 5 May 1971

General characteristics
- Class & type: Liberty ship; type EC2-S-C1, standard
- Tonnage: 10,865 LT DWT; 7,176 GRT
- Displacement: 3,380 long tons (3,434 t) (light); 14,245 long tons (14,474 t) (max)
- Length: 441 feet 6 inches (135 m) oa; 416 feet (127 m) pp; 427 feet (130 m) lwl
- Beam: 57 feet (17 m)
- Draft: 27 ft 9.25 in (8.4646 m)
- Installed power: 2 × Oil fired 450 °F (232 °C) boilers, operating at 220 psi (1,500 kPa); 2,500 hp (1,900 kW)
- Propulsion: 1 × triple-expansion steam engine, (manufactured by General Machinery Corp., Hamilton, Ohio); 1 × screw propeller
- Speed: 11.5 knots (21.3 km/h; 13.2 mph)
- Capacity: 562,608 cubic feet (15,931 m^{3}) (grain); 499,573 cubic feet (14,146 m^{3}) (bale)
- Complement: 38–62 USMM; 21–40 USNAG
- Armament: Varied by ship; Bow-mounted 3-inch (76 mm)/50-caliber gun; Stern-mounted 4-inch (102 mm)/50-caliber gun; 2–8 × single 20-millimeter (0.79 in) Oerlikon anti-aircraft (AA) cannons and/or, 2–8 × 37-millimeter (1.46 in) M1 AA guns

SS Thomas Stone was a Liberty ship built in the United States during World War II. She was named after Thomas Stone, a Founding Father, American planter and lawyer who signed the United States Declaration of Independence as a delegate for Maryland. He later worked on the committee that formed the Articles of Confederation in 1777. He acted as President of Congress for a short time in 1784.

== Construction ==
Thomas Stone was laid down on 20 October 1941, under a Maritime Commission (MARCOM) contract, MCE hull 27, by the Bethlehem-Fairfield Shipyard, Baltimore, Maryland; and was launched on 12 April 1942.

== History ==
Thomas Stone was allocated to American West African Line Inc., on 16 May 1942. On 30 December 1947, she was laid up in the Hudson River Reserve Fleet, Jones Point, New York. On 11 June 1952, she was laid up in the James River Reserve Fleet, Lee Hall, Virginia. On 6 May 1954, Thomas Stone was withdrawn from the fleet to be loaded with grain under the "Grain Program 1954", she returned loaded on 17 May 1954. On 13 August 1956, she was withdrawn to be unload, she returned reloaded with grain 31 August 1956. On 4 May 1963, Thomas Stone was withdrawn from the fleet to be unloaded, she returned empty on 12 May 1963. She was sold for scrapping on 13 April 1971, to Northern Metal Company, for $41,200. She was removed from the fleet, 5 May 1971.

== Bibliography ==
- "Bethlehem-Fairfield, Baltimore MD". www.ShipbuildingHistory.com. 14 August 2008.
- Maritime Administration. "Thomas Stone". Ship History Database Vessel Status Card. U.S. Department of Transportation, Maritime Administration.
- Davies, James (May 2004). "Specifications (As-Built)" (PDF). p. 23.
- "SS Thomas Stone".
