= SS Richard A. Van Pelt =

World War II Liberty ship of the United States

History

United States
- Name: Richard A. Van Pelt
- Namesake: Richard A. Van Pelt
- Ordered: as type (EC2-S-C1) hull, MC hull 2401
- Builder: J.A. Jones Construction, Brunswick, Georgia
- Cost: $867,824
- Yard number: 186
- Way number: 4
- Laid down: 9 January 1945
- Launched: 17 February 1945
- Sponsored by: Mrs. Duncan Morton
- Completed: 28 February 1945
- Fate: Transferred to Belgium, 28 February 1945

Belgium
- Name: Belgium Equity
- Operator: American West African Line, Inc.
- Acquired: 28 February 1945
- Fate: Sold to Belgium, 18 December 1946

Belgium
- Name: Capitaine Heusers
- Fate: Scrapped, 1969

General characteristics
- Class & type: Liberty ship; type EC2-S-C1, standard
- Tonnage: 10,865 LT DWT; 7,176 GRT
- Displacement: 3,380 long tons (3,434 t) (light); 14,245 long tons (14,474 t) (max)
- Length: 441 feet 6 inches (135 m) oa; 416 feet (127 m) pp; 427 feet (130 m) lwl
- Beam: 57 feet (17 m)
- Draft: 27 ft 9.25 in (8.4646 m)
- Installed power: 2 × Oil fired 450 °F (232 °C) boilers, operating at 220 psi (1,500 kPa); 2,500 hp (1,900 kW)
- Propulsion: 1 × triple-expansion steam engine, (manufactured by General Machinery Corp., Hamilton, Ohio); 1 × screw propeller
- Speed: 11.5 knots (21.3 km/h; 13.2 mph)
- Capacity: 562,608 cubic feet (15,931 m^{3}) (grain); 499,573 cubic feet (14,146 m^{3}) (bale)
- Complement: 38–62 USMM; 21–40 USNAG
- Armament: Varied by ship; Bow-mounted 3-inch (76 mm)/50-caliber gun; Stern-mounted 4-inch (102 mm)/50-caliber gun; 2–8 × single 20-millimeter (0.79 in) Oerlikon anti-aircraft (AA) cannons and/or, 2–8 × 37-millimeter (1.46 in) M1 AA guns

SS Richard A. Van Pelt was a Liberty ship built in the United States during World War II. She was named after Richard A. Van Pelt.

== Construction ==
Richard A. Van Pelt was laid down on 9 January 1945, under a United States Maritime Commission (MARCOM) contract, MC hull 2401, by J.A. Jones Construction, Brunswick, Georgia; she was sponsored by Mrs. Duncan Morton, and launched on 17 February 1945.

== History ==
She was transferred to Belgium, and renamed Belgium Equity on 28 February 1945. She was operated by the American West African Line, Inc. On 18 December 1946, she was sold to Belgium, for $579,770.03. She was scrapped in 1969.

== Bibliography ==
- "Jones Construction, Brunswick GA". ShipbuildingHistory.com. 13 October 2010.
- "Liberty Ships – World War II".
- Maritime Administration. "Richard A. Van Pelt". Ship History Database Vessel Status Card. U.S. Department of Transportation, Maritime Administration. Archived from the original on 12 December 2019.
- Davies, James (May 2004). "Specifications (As-Built)" (PDF). p. 23.
- "SS Richard A. Van Pelt".
