= SS Jared Ingersoll =

Liberty ship of WWII

History

United States
- Name: Jared Ingersoll
- Namesake: Jared Ingersoll
- Owner: War Shipping Administration (WSA)
- Operator: American West African Line, Inc.
- Ordered: as type (EC2-S-C1) hull, MCE hull 60
- Awarded: 14 March 1941
- Builder: Bethlehem-Fairfield Shipyard, Baltimore, Maryland
- Cost: $1,074,809
- Yard number: 2047
- Way number: 1
- Laid down: 24 June 1942
- Launched: 15 August 1942
- Sponsored by: Mrs. B.N. Ward
- Completed: 25 August 1942
- Identification: Call sign: KGJR
- Fate: Laid up in the National Defense Reserve Fleet, Wilmington, North Carolina, 13 January 1947; Sold for scrapping, 7 July 1964, withdrawn from fleet, 4 August 1962

General characteristics
- Class & type: Liberty ship; type EC2-S-C1, standard
- Tonnage: 10,865 LT DWT; 7,176 GRT
- Displacement: 3,380 long tons (3,434 t) (light); 14,245 long tons (14,474 t) (max)
- Length: 441 feet 6 inches (135 m) oa; 416 feet (127 m) pp; 427 feet (130 m) lwl
- Beam: 57 feet (17 m)
- Draft: 27 ft 9.25 in (8.4646 m)
- Installed power: 2 × Oil fired 450 °F (232 °C) boilers, operating at 220 psi (1,500 kPa); 2,500 hp (1,900 kW)
- Propulsion: 1 × triple-expansion steam engine, (manufactured by Worthington Pump & Machinery Corp, Harrison, New Jersey); 1 × screw propeller
- Speed: 11.5 knots (21.3 km/h; 13.2 mph)
- Capacity: 562,608 cubic feet (15,931 m^{3}) (grain); 499,573 cubic feet (14,146 m^{3}) (bale)
- Complement: 38–62 USMM; 21–40 USNAG
- Armament: Varied by ship; Bow-mounted 3-inch (76 mm)/50-caliber gun; Stern-mounted 4-inch (102 mm)/50-caliber gun; 2–8 × single 20-millimeter (0.79 in) Oerlikon anti-aircraft (AA) cannons and/or, 2–8 × 37-millimeter (1.46 in) M1 AA guns

SS Jared Ingersoll was a Liberty ship built in the United States during World War II. She was named after Jared Ingersoll, an American Founding Father, lawyer, and statesman from Philadelphia, Pennsylvania. He was a delegate to the Continental Congress and a signatory of the Constitution of the United States.

== Construction ==
Jared Ingersoll was laid down on 24 June 1942, under a Maritime Commission (MARCOM) contract, MCE hull 60, by the Bethlehem-Fairfield Shipyard, Baltimore, Maryland; she was sponsored by Mrs. B.N. Ward, the wife of Commander Ward, the Assistant to the Industrial Manager, Fifth Naval District, Baltimore, and was launched on 15 August 1942.

== History ==
She was allocated to American West African Line, Inc., on 25 August 1942. On 13 January 1947, she was laid up in the National Defense Reserve Fleet, Wilmington, North Carolina. She was sold for scrapping on 7 July 1964, to Horton Industries, Inc., for $46,600. She was withdrawn from the fleet on 4 August 1964.

== Bibliography ==
- "Bethlehem-Fairfield, Baltimore MD". www.ShipbuildingHistory.com. 14 August 2008.
- Maritime Administration. "Jared Ingersoll". Ship History Database Vessel Status Card. U.S. Department of Transportation, Maritime Administration.
- Davies, James (May 2004). "Specifications (As-Built)" (PDF). p. 23.
- "SS Jared Ingersoll".
