= SS Stephen Smith =

Liberty ship of WWII

History

United States
- Name: Stephen Smith
- Namesake: Stephen Smith
- Owner: War Shipping Administration (WSA)
- Operator: American West African Line Inc.
- Ordered: as type (EC2-S-C1) hull, MC hull 2326
- Builder: J.A. Jones Construction, Panama City, Florida
- Cost: $928,380
- Yard number: 67
- Way number: 6
- Laid down: 26 September 1944
- Launched: 31 October 1944
- Sponsored by: Mrs. Edward Overcash
- Completed: 13 November 1944
- Identification: Call sign: KYUH
- Fate: Laid up in the James River Reserve Fleet, Lee Hall, Virginia, 7 May 1946; Placed in the National Defense Reserve Fleet, Wilmington, North Carolina, 26 February 1948; Sold for scrapping, 19 February 1960, withdrawn from the fleet, 28 March 1960

General characteristics
- Class & type: Liberty ship; type EC2-S-C1, standard
- Tonnage: 10,865 LT DWT; 7,176 GRT
- Displacement: 3,380 long tons (3,434 t) (light); 14,245 long tons (14,474 t) (max)
- Length: 441 feet 6 inches (135 m) oa; 416 feet (127 m) pp; 427 feet (130 m) lwl
- Beam: 57 feet (17 m)
- Draft: 27 ft 9.25 in (8.4646 m)
- Installed power: 2 × Oil fired 450 °F (232 °C) boilers, operating at 220 psi (1,500 kPa); 2,500 hp (1,900 kW)
- Propulsion: 1 × triple-expansion steam engine, (manufactured by Filer and Stowell, Milwaukee, Wisconsin); 1 × screw propeller
- Speed: 11.5 knots (21.3 km/h; 13.2 mph)
- Capacity: 562,608 cubic feet (15,931 m^{3}) (grain); 499,573 cubic feet (14,146 m^{3}) (bale)
- Complement: 38–62 USMM; 21–40 USNAG
- Armament: Varied by ship; Bow-mounted 3-inch (76 mm)/50-caliber gun; Stern-mounted 4-inch (102 mm)/50-caliber gun; 2–8 × single 20-millimeter (0.79 in) Oerlikon anti-aircraft (AA) cannons and/or, 2–8 × 37-millimeter (1.46 in) M1 AA guns

SS Stephen Smith was a Liberty ship built in the United States during World War II. She was named after Stephen Smith.

== Construction ==
Stephen Smith was laid down on 26 September 1944, under a Maritime Commission (MARCOM) contract, MC hull 2326, by J.A. Jones Construction, Panama City, Florida; sponsored by Mrs. Edward Overcash, wife of superintendent marine and electrical facilities, and launched on 31 October 1944.

== History ==
She was allocated to American West African Line Inc., 13 November 1944. On 7 May 1946, she was laid up in the James River Reserve Fleet, Lee Hall, Virginia. On 26 February 1948, she was placed in the National Defense Reserve Fleet, in Wilmington, North Carolina.

She was sold for scrapping, 19 February 1960, to Bethlehem Steel, for $70,161. She was withdrawn from the fleet, 28 March 1960.

== Bibliography ==
- "Jones Construction, Panama City FL". www.ShipbuildingHistory.com. 13 October 2010.
- Maritime Administration. "Stephen Smith". Ship History Database Vessel Status Card. U.S. Department of Transportation, Maritime Administration. This article incorporates text from this source, which is in the public domain.
- Davies, James (May 2004). "Specifications (As-Built)" (PDF). p. 23.
- "SS Stephen Smith".
