= USCGC Acacia (WAGL-200) =

American mine planter and buoy tender

History

United States Army
- Name: General John P. Story
- Namesake: Major General John P. Story
- Builder: Fabricated Shipbuilding Corporation and Coddington Engineering Company, Milwaukee, Wisconsin
- Laid down: 1918
- Launched: 15 September 1919
- Acquired: 1920
- Commissioned: 1920
- Fate: Transferred to the United States Lighthouse Service, 1927

United States Coast Guard
- Name: USCGC Acacia
- Namesake: Acacia
- Acquired: 1922
- Commissioned: 14 April 1927
- Identification: Hull symbol: WAGL-200
- Fate: Sunk by German submarine, 15 March 1942
- Notes: USLHS absorbed by the USCG 1 July 1939

General characteristics
- Class & type: mine planter as built, later Speedwell-class buoy tender
- Displacement: 1,130 long tons (1,150 t)
- Length: 172 ft 6 in (52.58 m)
- Beam: 32 ft (9.8 m)
- Draft: 11 ft 6 in (3.51 m)
- Installed power: 2 × Page & Burton water-tube boilers; 1,000 shp (750 kW)
- Propulsion: 2 × Allis-Chalmers compound, inverted, reciprocating steam engines; 2 × propellers
- Range: 1,692 mi (2,723 km) at 11 kn (20 km/h; 13 mph)
- Complement: 33 (pre-war); 44 (1942)

USCGC Acacia (WAGL-200) was originally built for service by the U.S. Army as a mine planter shortly after World War I and later transferred to the U.S. Lighthouse Service, which became part of the U.S. Coast Guard in 1939; when transferred the ship was redesignated as a Speedwell-class buoy tender. She was sunk in 1942 by a German U-boat.

== Construction ==
Acacia was laid down by Fabricated Shipbuilding Corporation and Coddington Engineering Company, Milwaukee, Wisconsin, as the mine planter USAMP General John P. Story, for the U.S. Army, sometime around 1 October 1918. She was named for Major General John Patten Story, Chief of Artillery 1904–1905. She was launched on 15 September 1919 and was delivered around 1 May 1920, then commissioned into the Army's Mine Planter Service at Milwaukee.

== Service history ==
=== Army – transfer to the Lighthouse Service ===
Acacia was a mine planter, USAMP General John P. Story, originally built for the U.S. Army in 1919. Although intended for the Coast Defenses of Pensacola, Florida, she never served there. Transferred in November 1920 to the Army Supply Base, Brooklyn, New York. Transferred in April 1921 to Fort Totten, New York in the Coast Defenses of Eastern New York. Transferred in August 1921 to Fort Monroe, Virginia in the Coast Defenses of Chesapeake Bay. The ship was decommissioned on 10 November 1921.

Six vessels of this type were transferred to the U.S. Lighthouse Service at no cost in 1921–1927 and redesignated as Speedwell-class lighthouse tenders, also functioning as buoy tenders. The original intent was for these vessels to serve a dual purpose: mine planter in case of a war, and lighthouse tender during peacetime. Unfortunately, this conversion proved to be impracticable and too expensive and they were modified exclusively for service as tenders at a cost of between $41,022 to $110,963. Each had a turtleback forecastle installed and their anchors were mounted high to prevent the ship from being hung up on a buoy she was servicing. A steel main deck was added forward; new windows were installed in the pilothouse, and a new refrigerating plant was added. All vessels were then commissioned from 1923 to 1927 with new names.

=== Lighthouse Service and Coast Guard service ===
Acacia was assigned to the San Juan, Puerto Rico, area 21 April 1927. The ship's field of operations included Puerto Rico and adjacent islands, Virgin Islands, Guantánamo Bay, and Cuba. Although the ship was designated as a lighthouse tender she was also used to perform construction and repair of stations, small structures, piers, etc. in addition to her work of tending aids to navigation. After the San Felipe hurricane on 13 September 1928, the crew nicknamed themselves "The Acacia Construction Company" because of the number of repairs they performed. She ran aground off Fajardo, Puerto Rico, in September 1932, during a hurricane, probably the San Ciprian hurricane, but was safely refloated.

The ship's main mission was to place and repair aids to navigation equipment, in which they maintained approximately 255 during her time in service. The crew supported shore lights, unwatched lights, lighted buoys, unlighted buoys and beacons, and radio beacons on both the Panama Canals Atlantic and Pacific sides, the western Caribbean, Morro Puercas and the Jicarita Island Lights. In addition, Acacia rendered numerous salvage services involving vessels and persons in distress. The most notable was the rescue of the Brazilian training ship Almirante Saldanha. The vessel and its crew were given up for lost after the ship had run aground off San Juan Harbor Entrance 25 July 1938. Acacia rescued her crew, and the rescue created a celebration in Brazil and gained the attention of international officials.

In June 1938, Boatswain Ora Doyle took command of the tender from Master John A. Anderson, who transferred to command USCGC Manzanita. In late 1939, Acacia and USCGC Unalga towed the seized Italian tanker Colorado, which had its engine room damaged through sabotage by its interned crew, from San Juan to Galveston, Texas for repairs, one of the longest towing operations in Coast Guard history to that time.

==== Sinking ====
On 15 March 1942, from 11:37 until 12:11, while en route alone from Curaçao, Netherlands West Indies to Antigua, British West Indies, Acacia was sunk by gunfire from the German submarine U-161 as part of Operation Neuland approximately 150 mi (130 nmi; 240 km) south of Port-au-Prince, Haiti. The U-boat opened fire on the unarmed tender with 68 rounds from her 10.5-centimetre (4.1 in)/45 caliber deck gun, 92 rounds from her 3.7-centimetre (1.5 in)/83 caliber anti-aircraft (AA) gun, and 70 rounds from her 2-centimetre (0.8 in)/65 caliber AA gun. Acacia caught fire and the entire crew of Acacia abandoned ship before she sank by the stern. The survivors were located by a PBY Catalina flying boat and picked up by the destroyer USS Overton. They were landed at San Juan 16 March 1942. She was the only U.S. buoy tender sunk by enemy action during World War II.

Acacia sank at 16°17′N 63°44′W, about 80 mi (70 nmi; 130 km) southwest of Saint Kitts and Nevis.

== See also ==
- List of ships of the United States Army § Mine Planters

== Notes ==
=== Bibliography ===
- "Shipbuilding Notes". Shipping: A Weekly Record of Marine Transportation, Supplemented by Ship Construction and Outfitting Notes and News. IV (5). Shipping Publishing Co. Inc., New York City. 3 August 1918.
- "Acacia, 1927" (PDF). U.S. Coast Guard Historian's Office. Archived from the original (PDF) on 22 August 2011. This article incorporates text from this source, which is in the public domain.
- "U.S. Coast Guard Tenders - 1915 Through WWII (WAG, WAGB, WAGL, WLB, WLM, WLI, WLR, WIX)". www.ShipbuildingHistory.com. 14 February 2016.
- Clay, Steven E. (2010). US Army Order of Battle 1919–1941, vol. 2 (PDF). Fort Leavenworth, Kansas: Combat Studies Institute Press. p. 1195.
- Helgason, Guðmundur. "USCGC Acacia (WAGL 200)". www.UBoat.net.
