= SS Uniwaleco =

South-African Whale Factory ship

History
- Name: (United Kingdom) Mahronda (1905-1923); (Norway) Sir James Clark Ross (1923-1930); (Denmark) Fraternitas (1923-1937); (South Africa) Uniwaleco (1937-1942)
- Owner: Union Whaling Co. Ltd.
- Port of registry: Durban, South Africa
- Builder: Harland and Wolff
- Yard number: 369
- Launched: 17 June 1905
- Completed: August 1905
- Identification: ZSGR; Official number: 120868
- Fate: Torpedoed and sunk 7 March 1942

General characteristics
- Type: Whale Factory ship
- Tonnage: 9,755 GRT
- Length: 147.5 metres (483 ft 11 in)
- Beam: 17.8 metres (58 ft 5 in)
- Depth: 9.5 metres (31 ft 2 in)
- Installed power: 1 x 4 cyl. Quadruple expansion steam engine
- Propulsion: Two screw propellers
- Speed: 12 knots
- Crew: 51

SS Uniwaleco was a South-African Whale Factory ship that was torpedoed by the German submarine U-161 in the Caribbean Sea 45 nautical miles (83 km) west of the Saint Vincent Passage on 7 March 1942 while she was travelling from Curaçao to Freetown with a stopover in Trinidad while carrying a cargo of 8800 tons of fuel oil.

== Construction ==
Uniwaleco was built at the Harland & Wolff shipyard in Belfast, United Kingdom in August 1905. Where she was launched and completed that same year. The ship was 147.5 metres (483 ft 11 in) long, had a beam of 17.8 metres (58 ft 5 in) and had a depth of 9.5 metres (31 ft 2 in). She was assessed at 9,755 GRT and had 1 x 4 cyl. Quadruple expansion steam engine driving two screw propellers. The ship could generate 658 n.h.p. with a speed of 12 knots thanks to her two double boilers, two single boilers and 18 corrugated furnaces.

== Sinking ==
Uniwaleco was travelling unescorted from Curaçao to Freetown with a stopover in Trinidad while carrying a cargo of 8800 tons of fuel oil when on 7 March 1942 at 17.59 pm, she was hit by one of two torpedoes from the German submarine U-161 in the Caribbean Sea 45 nautical miles (83 km) west of the Saint Vincent Passage. The damaged ship became uncontrollable and settled in the water while sailing in circles, but she did not sink. The U-boat fired a coup de grâce at Uniwaleco 15 minutes after the first attack and hit her in the aft of the ship which broke her in two and sank her within three minutes. The sinking took the lives of 18 crewmen with the 33 survivors taking to a lifeboat and landing on St. Vincent.

== Wreck ==
The wreck of Uniwaleco lies at (13°23′N 62°04′W).
