= SS Empire Eland =

5,613 GRT Design 1019 cargo ship that was built in 1920

History
- Name: West Kedron (1920–40); Empire Eland (1940–41)
- Owner: United States Shipping Board (1920–28); American West Africa Line (1928–33); United States Shipping Board (1933–37); United States Maritime Commission (1937–40); Ministry of Shipping (1940); Ministry of War Transport (1940–41)
- Operator: United States Shipping Board (1920–28); Barber Steamship Co (1928–33); United States Shipping Board (1933–37); United States Maritime Commission (1937–40); Douglas & Ramsey (1940–41)
- Port of registry: (United States) Los Angeles (1920-37); (United States) New York City; (United Kingdom) London (1940–41)
- Builder: Long Beach Shipbuilding Co
- Yard number: 137
- Launched: 1920
- Completed: August 1920
- Out of service: 15 September 1941
- Identification: United States Official Number 220317 (1920-40); United Kingdom Official Number 168041 (1940-41); Code Letters LWVR (1920-34); Code Letters KDAP (1934–40); Code Letters GLXD (1940–41)
- Fate: Torpedoed and sunk, September 1941

General characteristics
- Class & type: Design 1019 ship
- Tonnage: 5,620 GRT (1920-40); 5,613 GRT (1940-41); 3,516 NRT (1920-40); 3,520 NRT (1940–41); 8,538 DWT
- Length: 410 ft 5 in (125.10 m)
- Beam: 54 ft 2 in (16.51 m)
- Draught: 24 ft 0 1/2 in (7.328 m)
- Depth: 27 ft 2 in (8.28 m)
- Installed power: 359 nhp
- Propulsion: Triple expansion steam engine, single screw propeller
- Speed: 10.5 knots (19.4 km/h)
- Crew: 33, plus 5 DEMS gunners

Location where Empire Eland was torpedoed and sunk.

Empire Eland was a 5,613 GRT Design 1019 cargo ship that was built in 1920 as West Kedron by Long Beach Shipbuilding Co, Long Beach, California, United States for the United States Shipping Board (USSB). She was transferred to the United States Maritime Commission (USMC) in 1937. In 1940, she was transferred to the Ministry of War Transport (MoWT). She was torpedoed and sunk by U-94 on the night of 15–16 September 1941.

== Description ==
The ship was built in 1920 by Long Beach Shipbuilding Co, Long Beach, California. She was yard number 137,

As built, the ship was 410 feet 5 inches (125.10 m) long, with a beam of 54 feet 2 inches (16.51 m). She had a depth of 27 feet 2 inches (8.28 m), and a draught of 24 feet 0 1/2 inch (7.328 m). She was assessed at 5,620 GRT, 3,516 NRT, 8,538 DWT.

The ship was propelled by a 359 nhp triple expansion steam engine, which had cylinders of 24 1/2 inches (62 cm), 41 1/2 inches (105 cm)) and 72 inches (180 cm) diameter by 48 inches (120 cm) stroke. The engine was built by Llewellyn Iron Works, Los Angeles, California. It drove a single screw propeller and could propel the ship at 10.5 knots (19.4 km/h).

== History ==
West Kedron was built in 1920 for the USSB. The United States Official Number 220317 and Code Letters LWVR were allocated. Her port of registry was Los Angeles, California. She was delivered in August 1920. In 1928, she was transferred to the American West African Line, and placed under the management of the Barber Steamship Co. West Kedron was returned to the USSB in 1933. With the change of Code Letters in 1934, West Kedron was allocated KDAP. The USSB became the USMC in 1937, and her port of registry was changed to New York. West Kedron was then laid up as part of the reserved fleet.

In 1940, West Kedron was transferred to the Ministry of Shipping, which later became part of the MoWT. She was due to join Convoy HX 69, which departed from Halifax, Nova Scotia, Canada on 28 August and arrived at Liverpool, Lancashire on 12 September. She did not sail with this convoy, but joined the next convoy. This was Convoy HX 70, which sailed on 1 September and arrived at Liverpool on 16 September. West Kedron was carrying a cargo of pig iron bound for Swansea, Glamorgan. West Kedron was a member of Convoy WN 25, which departed from the Clyde on 23 October and arrived at Methil, Fife on 27 October. She then joined Convoy FS 322, which departed on 29 October and arrived at Southend, Essex on 1 November.

West Kedron was renamed Empire Eland becoming one of the Empire ships. The United Kingdom Official Number 168041 and Code Letters GLXD were allocated. She was placed under the management of Douglas & Ramsey. Her port of registry was London. She was assessed as 5,613 GRT, 3,520 NRT. Empire Eland was a member of Convoy FN 346, which departed from Southend on 29 November and arrived at Methil on 1 December. She then joined Convoy EN 35, which departed on 2 December and arrived at Oban, Argyllshire on 6 December. She continued on to the Clyde, arriving on 7 December. Empire Eland was a member of Convoy OB 262, which departed from Liverpool on 20 December and dispersed at sea on 23 December. She was in ballast, bound for Philadelphia, Pennsylvania, United States. She arrived on 10 January 1941, sailing on 27 January for Halifax, where she arrived on 22 January. Laden with a cargo of steel, Empire Eland was a member of Convoy HX 108, which departed from Halifax on 9 February and arrived at Liverpool on 27 February. She then sailed to Newport, Monmouthshire, from where she departed on 18 March for Swansea, arriving the next day.

Empire Eland departed from Swansea on 19 March for the Clyde, arriving on 21 March. She was a member of Convoy OB 303, which departed from Liverpool on 28 March and dispersed at sea on 3 April. She was bound for Baltimore, Ohio. Empire Eland is recorded as leaving Halifax on 15 April, and returning on 25 April. She then joined Convoy SC 30, which departed on 29 April and arrived at Liverpool on 20 May. She was carrying a cargo of steel, and left the convoy at Loch Ewe, arriving on 16 May. Empire Eland then sailed to the Belfast Lough, arriving on 19 May. She then joined Convoy BB 23, which departed on 20 May and arrived at Milford Haven, Pembrokeshire on 22 May. She sailed on to Newport, arriving later that day.

Empire Eland sailed from Newport to Swansea on 1 June, departing on 7 June for Milford Haven, where she arrived later that day, sailing two days later to join Convoy OB 333, which departed from Liverpool on 10 June and dispersed at 40°20′N 34°40′W on 21 June. She was bound for Boston, Massachusetts, where she arrived on 1 July. She sailed on 27 July for Halifax, arriving on 29 July. Empire Eland was a member of Convoy HX 142, which departed on 1 August and arrived at Liverpool on 18 August. She was carrying a cargo of scrap steel.

Empire Eland was a member of Convoy ON 14, which departed from Liverpool on 7 September and dispersed at 56°25′N 24°50′W on 14 September. She straggled behind the convoy. At 23:48 German time on 15 September, Empire Eland was struck by a torpedo fired by U-94, under the command of Kapitänleutnant Otto Ites. A coup de grâce fired at 23:57 missed, but a second fired at 00:30 sank the ship at 54°00′N 28°00′W. All 32 crew and five DEMS gunners were killed. Those killed serving on Empire Eland are commemorated on the Tower Hill Memorial.
