= Alanya Archaeological Museum =

Archaeological museum in Alanya, Turkey

Coordinates: 36°32′38″N 31°59′20″E

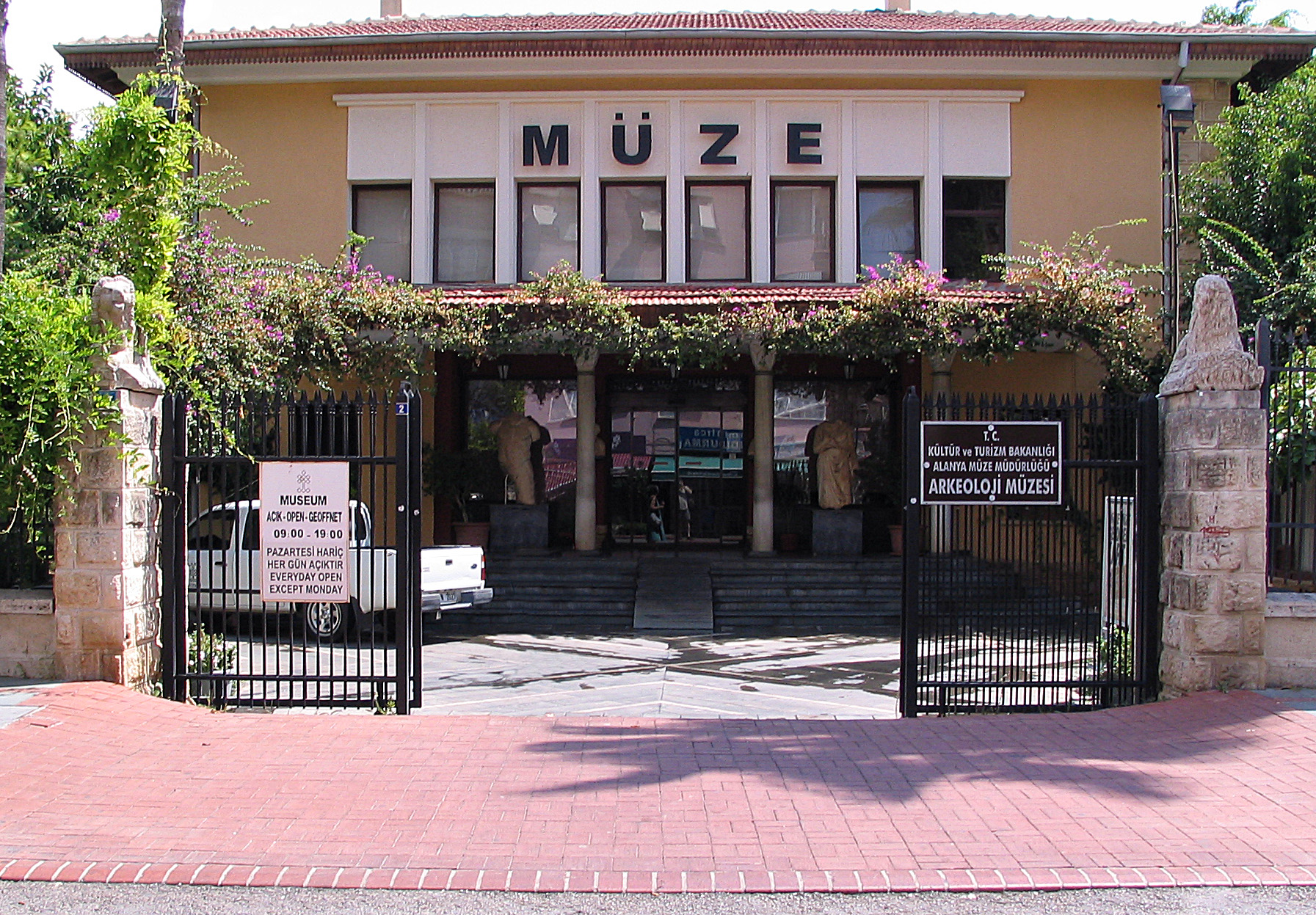
Alanya Archaeological Museum

Alanya Archaeological Museum is an archaeological museum in Alanya, Turkey. The museum is divided into two sections, with displays of archaeological and ethnographic artifacts. It contains numerous ceramic, marble, bronze and glass pieces and mosaics from the Hellenistic, Roman, and Byzantine periods. Of particular note is its 2nd century bronze statue of Hercules, which measures 52 centimetres (20 in) in height. The museum, which was established in 1967, was refurbished in 2012.

== History ==
The museum was founded in 1967. At the time of the museum's opening, the exhibits were provided by the Museum of Anatolian Civilizations in Ankara; these artifacts related to the periods of early Bronze Age, Urartian, Phrygian, and Lidyan. Artfacts from the excavations at Laertes were gifted to the museum. Two sections display exhibits related to archaeological and ethnographic artifacts. Objects from the Hellenistic, Roman, and Byzantine periods are included in the museum's collections.

== Exhibits ==
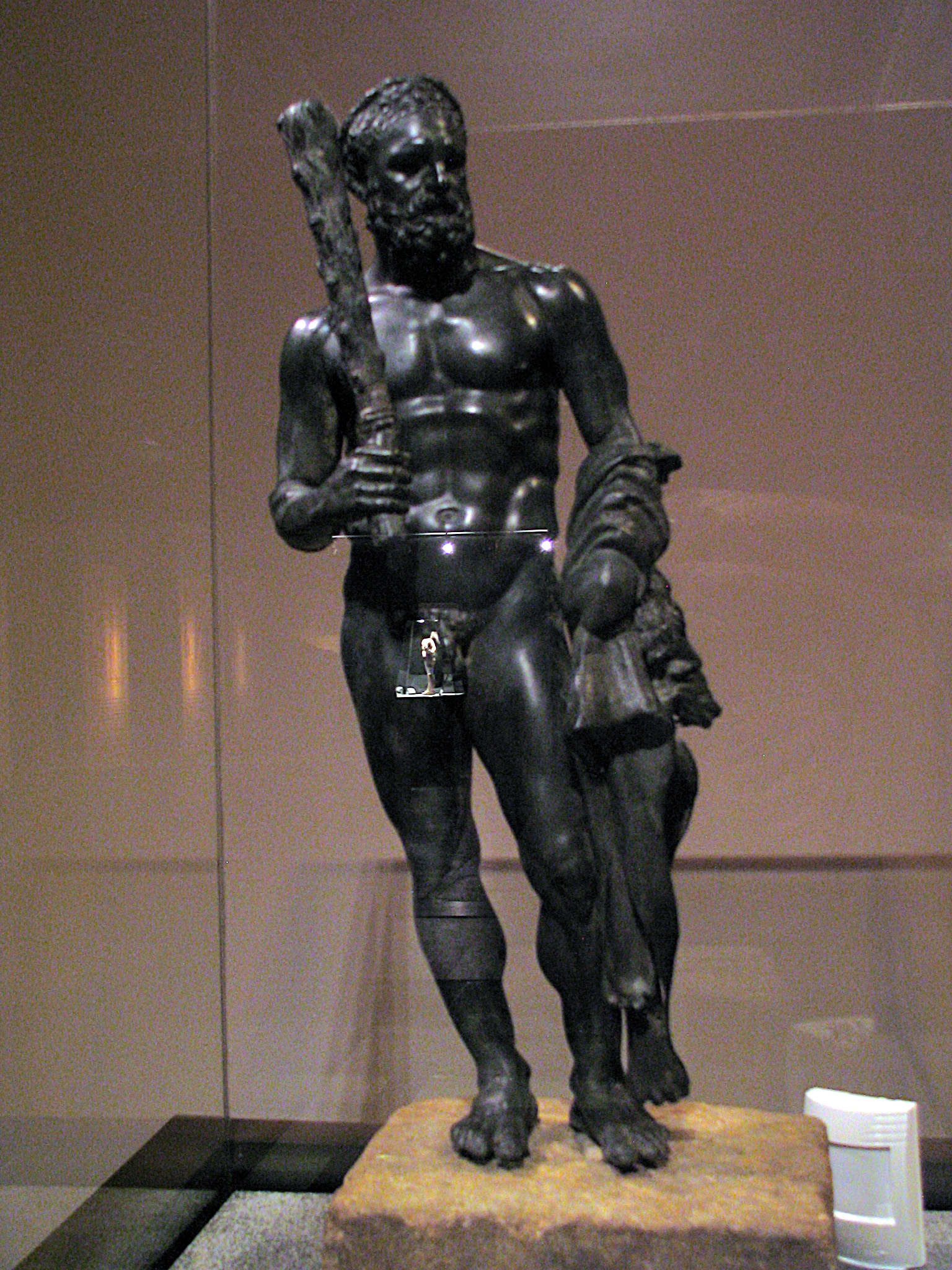
Bronze statue of Hercules

Some of the prominent artifacts on display include: two amphoras in good condition, which were recovered by fishermen from the waters in Antiochia and Cragnum, Greco-italic in form (dated to 250–150 BC), and a Will Type 10 Lamboglio 2 (dated to 100–40 BC); window frames with coverings carved with geometrical designs; an unusual wooden door frame with an inscription "Year 1237 H' (1821)" and flowery border ornamentation; coins from the period 700–500 B.C and also of the present period of the Turkish Republic; as well as a letter with 46 lines written by the Roman emperor Septimius Severus to the citizens of Syedra conveying a message of thanks.

Other is a prominent display in the central hall of an antiquity with an inscription on a stone of grey colour in the Phoenician language dated to 625 BC; also featured is traditional art of the Alanya area of the Yörük people such as bags made of goat's hair, bags attached to the saddle, garments, decorative fabric, cookware, table linen, cutlery, adornments, handwritten documents, writing tools and model room replicating everyday life. Additional displays include epigraphy and decorative artifacts of Orthodox Greeks from the Hagios Georgios church of Alanya; an array of exhibits related to navigation, such as a model of a ship loaded with amphorae found from the bed of the Mediterranean sea which were used to transport oil, and a container made of bronze ornamented with a sculpture of the mythical Pegasus.

== Grounds ==
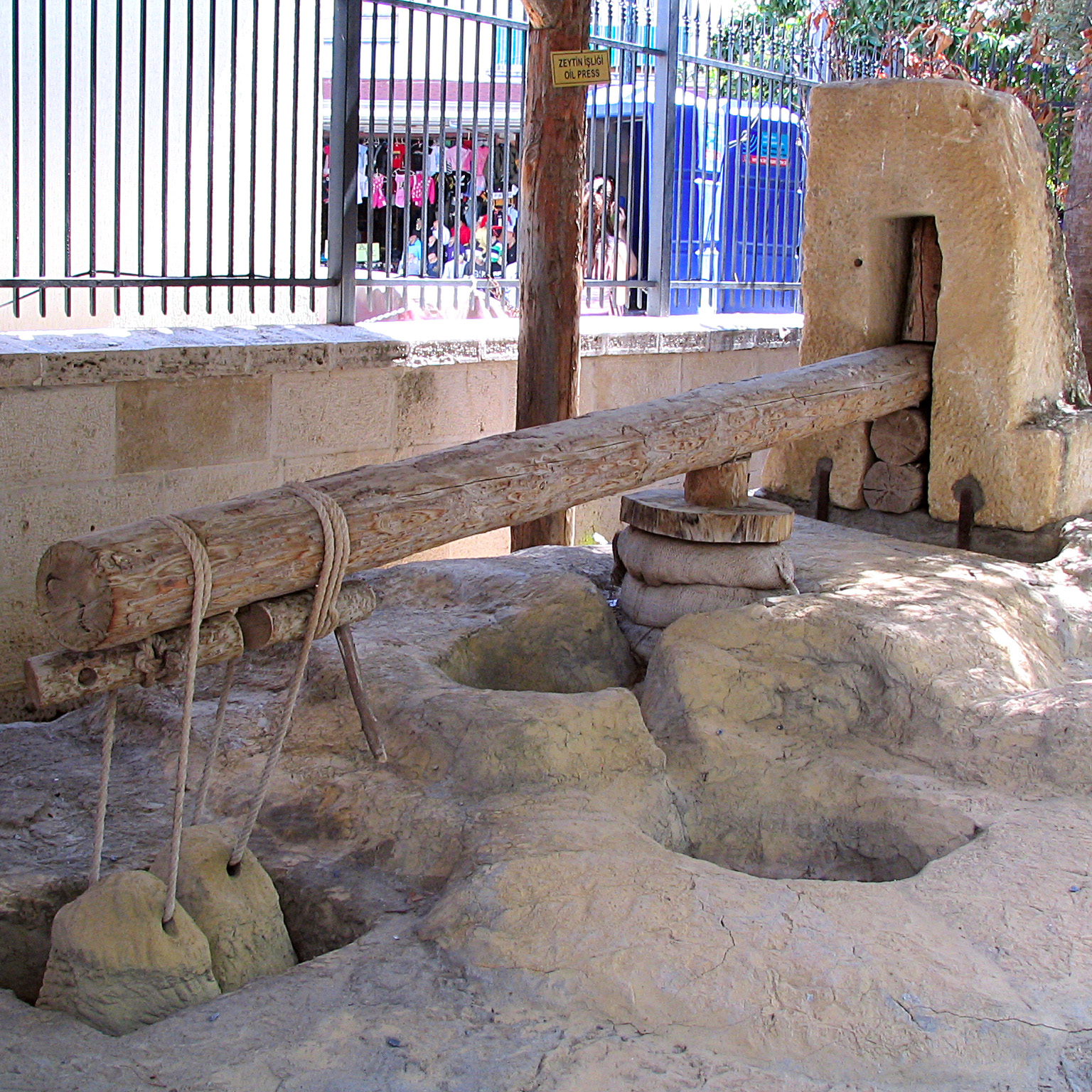
Oil press on the museum grounds

A garden surrounds the museum. There are a large number of artifacts related to funerary practices of the Roman period and the Islamic period of the Seljuk, Ottoman, and Republican periods. The open grounds have an exclusive wing in which exhibits related to agricultural practices of the Romans are on display including oil extraction methods followed in the ancient Mediterranean region.

== Bibliography ==
- Hoff, Michael C.; Townsend, Rhys F. (3 May 2013). Rough Cilicia: New Historical and Archaeological Approaches. Oxbow Books. ISBN 978-1-78297-060-6.
- Ireland, S.; Bechhoefer, William B. (1998). The Ottoman House: Papers from the Amasya Symposium, 24–27 September 1996. British Institute of Archaeology at Ankara. ISBN 978-1-898249-12-2.
- Oliver, G. J. (January 2000). The Sea in Antiquity. J. and E. Hedges. ISBN 978-1-84171-160-7.
