= Felix Riesenberg =

American maritime officer and writer

- Born: April 9, 1879; Milwaukee, Wisconsin
- Died: November 19, 1939 (aged 60); Scarsdale, New York
- Occupations: United States Merchant Marine; explorer; administrator; author
- Known for: writing

Felix Riesenberg (9 April 1879 – 19 November 1939) was an American maritime officer and writer of maritime professional, historical, and fictional literature in the early 20th century.

== Biography ==
External image
- Felix Riesenberg (1947). Portrait painting by his brother Sidney Riesenberg.

Riesenberg was born in Milwaukee, Wisconsin. He later attended the New York Nautical School, graduating in the class of 1897. Afterward, he secured a position as a deck officer in the United States Merchant Marine, serving in the United States Coast and Geodetic Survey. He also served in the United States Naval Reserve until 1909. Riesenberg was hired by Walter Wellman to be a part of the support crew in an unsuccessful attempt to reach the North Pole by airship in the summer of 1906. He was rehired by Wellman as the navigator aboard the three-man airship America in a second failed attempt to reach the North Pole in 1907.

After this, Riesenberg enrolled in the Columbia School of Engineering and Applied Science, from which he graduated in 1913.

Riesenberg worked as a civil Engineer for the State of New York from 1913 to 1915 and then again from 1920 to 1922. In the interim, he was the Chief Officer of the United States Shipping Board.

Riesenberg was the superintendent of the New York Nautical School on two occasions, from 1917 to 1919 as captain of the barkentine "Newport" and again from 1923 to 1924.

Riesenberg was also a prolific author, publishing a textbook, Standard Seamanship for the Merchant Service that became commonly used, as well as several maritime historical works and novels. He wrote several articles that appeared in the magazine The Nation. Riesenberg published his memoir Living Again in 1937.

Riesenberg died on 19 November 1939 in Scarsdale, New York. After a funeral service held in Bronxville. New York, his ashes were scattered at sea.

Riesenberg had four children, Felix Jr., William, Margaret (Peggy), and John (Jack). His son Felix Jr. (1913–1962) was also an author of numerous maritime books. Felix Jr.'s married a woman named Priscilla.

The New York Nautical School is today called the State University of New York Maritime College and is part of the State University of New York (SUNY) system. Present-day cadets are still taught the "Riesenberg Saying": "The sea is selective; slow at recognition of effort and aptitude, but fast in sinking the unfit."

== Selected bibliography ==
- Under Sail: A Boy's Voyage Around Cape Horn – 1918
- Standard Seamanship for the Merchant Service – 1922
- Bob Graham at Sea – 1925
- Vignettes of the Sea – 1926
- East Side, West Side – 1927, turned into a film of the same name also released in 1927
- Red Horses – 1928
- Shipmates: Sketches of the Sea – 1928
- Endless River – 1931
- The Maiden Voyage – 1931
- Passing Strangers – 1931
- Skyline – 1931, a film screenplay also based upon the 1927 novel East Side, West Side
- Mother Sea – 1933
- Log of the Sea – 1933
- The Left-handed Passenger – 1935
- Living Again : an Autobiography – 1937
- Cape Horn : the story of the Cape Horn region, including the straits of Magellan, from the days – 1939
- The Pacific Ocean – 1940 (published posthumously)

== Honors ==
The SS Felix Riesenberg, named in Riesenberg's honor, was a type EC2-S-C1 Liberty ship built at Brunswick, Georgia, and delivered to the U.S. Merchant Marine on 26 December 1944 . Following World War II she was sold to a private company in 1947 and finally scrapped in 1972.

In the 1940s, a sail training schooner at the United States Merchant Marine Academy in King's Point, New York, was renamed Felix Riesenberg, having previously been named Rhine.

Riesenberg Hall, on the campus of the State University of New York Maritime College, was dedicated on 6 May 1965 to honor Riesenberg. Riesenberg Hall, which houses the school's athletic department, contains a gymnasium and a natatorium. It hosts the college's basketball, volleyball, swimming, and diving events.

In 2001, Riesenberg was inducted into the National Maritime Hall of Fame at Kings Point.
