= Laertes (Cilicia) =

Town of ancient Cilicia

Coordinates: 36°30′38″N 32°09′57″E

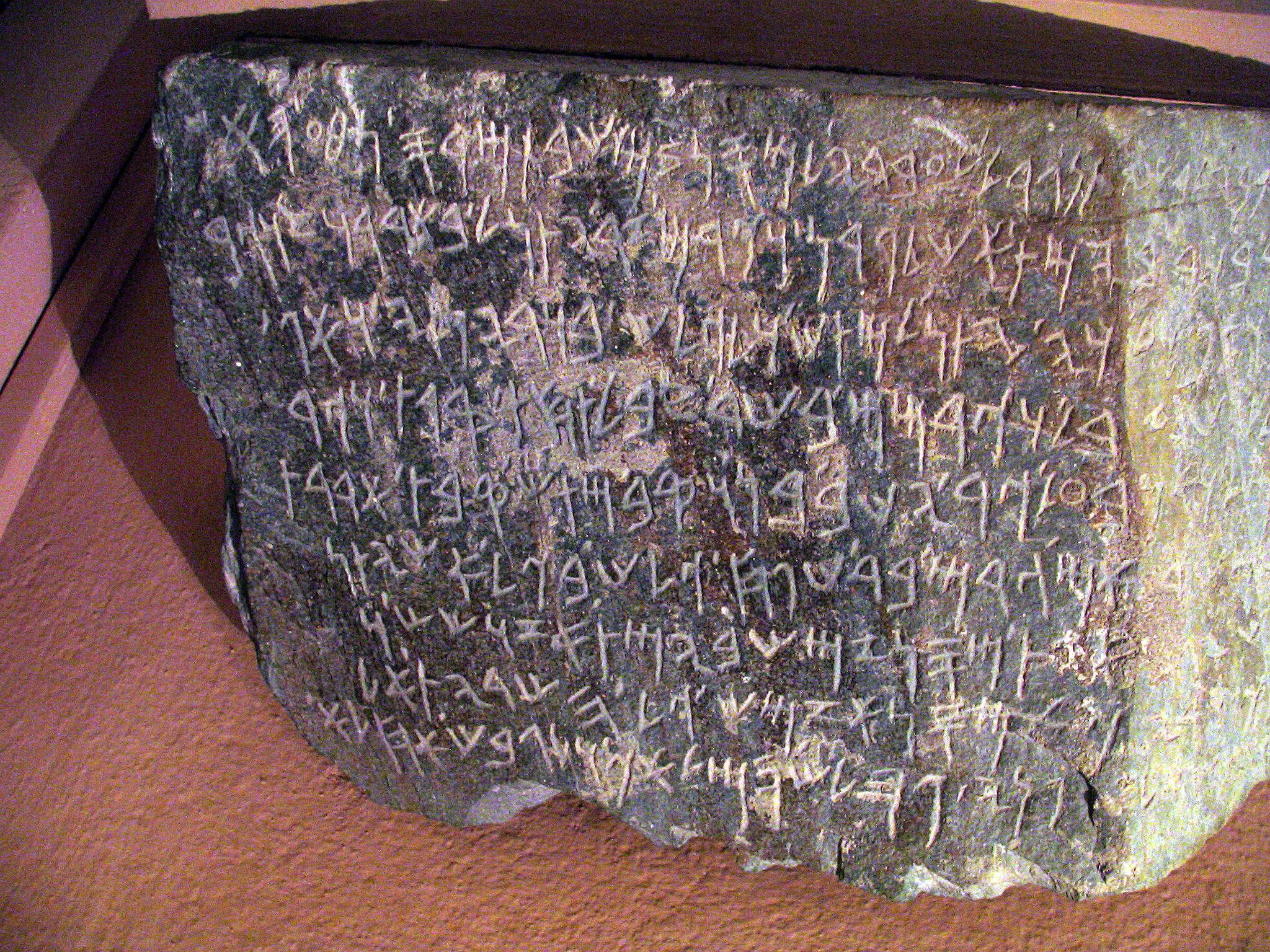
Çebel Ires Daǧı inscription - a Phoenician legal inscription found in Laertes

Laertes (Ancient Greek: Λαέρτης) was a town of ancient Cilicia. Some have supposed that the philosopher Diogenes Laërtius was from this town. Strabo called it a stronghold.

Its site is located near Cebelires in Antalya, Asiatic Turkey. Archaeologists have excavated the site; antiquities may be found at the Alanya Archaeological Museum.
