= HMS Laertes =

Three ships of the Royal Navy have borne the name HMS Laertes, after either Laertes, a figure in Greek mythology, or Laertes, a character in Shakespeare's Hamlet:

- HMS Laertes (1913) was a Laforey-class destroyer launched as HMS Sarpedon in 1913, but renamed shortly afterwards. She was sold for breaking up in 1921.
- HMT Laertes (T137) was an armed merchant trawler of the Royal Navy. She was torpedoed and sunk by U-201 on 25 July 1942 off Freetown, Sierra Leone.
- HMS Laertes (J433) was an Algerine-class minesweeper launched in 1944 and broken up in 1959.
