= 1151 Ithaka =

Carbonaceous asteroid from the inner regions of the asteroid belt

Discovery
- Discovered by: K. Reinmuth
- Discovery site: Heidelberg Obs.
- Discovery date: 8 September 1929

Designations
- Named after: Ithaca (Greek Ionian Island)
- Alternative designations: 1929 RK · 1966 LA
- Minor planet category: main-belt · (inner)

Orbital characteristics
- Epoch 4 September 2017 (JD 2458000.5)
- Uncertainty parameter 0
- Observation arc: 87.63 yr (32,007 days)
- Aphelion: 3.0719 AU
- Perihelion: 1.7417 AU
- Semi-major axis: 2.4068 AU
- Eccentricity: 0.2763
- Orbital period (sidereal): 3.73 yr (1,364 days)
- Mean anomaly: 212.71°
- Mean motion: 0° 15^{m} 50.4^{s} / day
- Inclination: 6.5616°
- Longitude of ascending node: 225.42°
- Argument of perihelion: 122.36°
- Earth MOID: 0.7459 AU · 290.6 LD

Physical characteristics
- Dimensions: 8.97±2.41 km 12.120±0.100 km 14±3 km 14.37 km (derived); 20.46±4.51 km
- Synodic rotation period: 4.93115±0.00011 h 4.9314±0.0003 h (Note: Pravec (2011), lightcurve plot of (1151) Ithaka. Observation: 14 September 2011. Rotation period 4.9314±0.0003 hours with a brightness amplitude of 0.12±0.01 mag. Quality Code of 3. Summary figures at Ondrejov Asteroid Photometry Project and LCDB); 4.932±0.001 h
- Geometric albedo: 0.02±0.02; 0.057 (assumed); 0.069±0.003; 0.0692±0.0033; 0.13±0.10
- Spectral type: C
- Absolute magnitude (H): 12.90±0.56 · 12.94 · 12.94±0.03 · 13.10 · 13.12 · 13.2

1151 Ithaka, provisional designation 1929 RK, is a carbonaceous asteroid from the inner regions of the asteroid belt, approximately 14 kilometers in diameter. It was discovered by Karl Reinmuth at the Heidelberg-Königstuhl State Observatory in 1929, and later named for the Greek island of Ithaca.

== Discovery ==
Ithaka was discovered on 8 September 1929, by German astronomer Karl Reinmuth at the Heidelberg Observatory in southwest Germany. Five nights later, it was independently discovered by Soviet astronomer Grigory Neujmin at Simeiz Observatory on the Crimean peninsula. Only the first discoverer is acknowledged by the Minor Planet Center. The body's observation arc begins with its official discovery observation at Heidelberg.

== Orbit and classification ==
Ithaka is a non-family asteroid from the background population. It orbits the Sun in the inner main-belt at a distance of 1.7–3.1 AU once every 3 years and 9 months (1,364 days). Its orbit has an eccentricity of 0.28 and an inclination of 7° with respect to the ecliptic.

== Physical characteristics ==
Ithaka is an assumed carbonaceous C-type asteroid, untypical for inner-belt asteroids.

=== Rotation period ===
In 2011, three rotational lightcurves of Ithaka were obtained from photometric observations. Lightcurve analysis gave a well-defined rotation period between 4.93115 and 4.932 hours with a brightness amplitude of 0.12 to 0.15 magnitude (U=3/3/3).

=== Diameter and albedo ===
According to the survey carried out by the NEOWISE mission of NASA's Wide-field Infrared Survey Explorer, Ithaka measures between 8.97 and 20.46 kilometers in diameter and its surface has an albedo between 0.02 and 0.13. A collaboration of Italian and American photometrists estimate a diameter of 14±3 kilometers, and the Collaborative Asteroid Lightcurve Link assumes a standard albedo for carbonaceous asteroids of 0.057 and derives a diameter of 14.37 kilometers based on an absolute magnitude of 12.94.

== Naming ==
This minor planet was named after the Greek Ionian Island of Ithaca located in the Ionian Sea. In Greek mythology, the legendary hero Odysseus was the King of Ithaca (also see 1143 Odysseus). The official naming citation was mentioned in The Names of the Minor Planets by Paul Herget in 1955 (H 107).
