= German submarine U-201 =

German World War II submarine

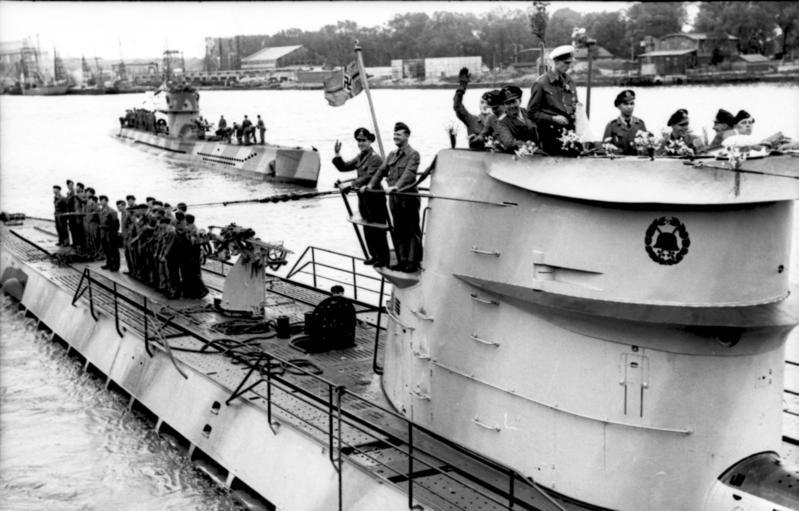
- U-123 and U-201 departing Lorient on 8 June 1941

History

Nazi Germany
- Name: U-201
- Ordered: 23 September 1939
- Builder: Germaniawerft, Kiel
- Yard number: 630
- Laid down: 20 January 1940
- Launched: 7 December 1940
- Commissioned: 25 January 1941
- Fate: Sunk, 17 February 1943

General characteristics
- Class & type: Type VIIC submarine
- Displacement: 769 tonnes (757 long tons) surfaced; 871 t (857 long tons) submerged
- Length: 67.10 m (220 ft 2 in) o/a; 50.50 m (165 ft 8 in) pressure hull
- Beam: 6.20 m (20 ft 4 in) o/a; 4.70 m (15 ft 5 in) pressure hull
- Height: 9.60 m (31 ft 6 in)
- Draught: 4.74 m (15 ft 7 in)
- Installed power: 2,800–3,200 PS (2,100–2,400 kW; 2,800–3,200 bhp) (diesels); 750 PS (550 kW; 740 shp) (electric)
- Propulsion: 2 shafts; 2 × diesel engines; 2 × electric motors
- Speed: 17.7 knots (32.8 km/h; 20.4 mph) surfaced; 7.6 knots (14.1 km/h; 8.7 mph) submerged
- Range: 8,500 nmi (15,700 km; 9,800 mi) at 10 knots (19 km/h; 12 mph) surfaced; 80 nmi (150 km; 92 mi) at 4 knots (7.4 km/h; 4.6 mph) submerged
- Test depth: 230 m (750 ft); Crush depth: 250–295 m (820–968 ft)
- Complement: 4 officers, 40–56 enlisted
- Armament: 5 × 53.3 cm (21 in) torpedo tubes (four bow, one stern); 14 × G7e torpedoes or 26 TMA mines; 1 × 8.8 cm (3.46 in) deck gun (220 rounds); 1 x 2 cm (0.79 in) C/30 AA gun

Service record
- Part of: 1st U-boat Flotilla; 25 January 1941 – 17 February 1943
- Identification codes: M 33 584
- Commanders: Oblt.z.S. / Kptlt. Adalbert Schnee; 25 January 1941 – 24 August 1942; Oblt.z.S. Günther Rosenberg; 25 August 1942 – 17 February 1943
- Operations: 9 patrols: 1st patrol: 22 April – 18 May 1941; 2nd patrol: 8 June – 19 July 1941; 3rd patrol: 14 – 25 August 1941; 4th patrol: 14 – 30 September 1941; 5th patrol: 29 October – 9 December 1941; 6th patrol: 24 March – 21 May 1942; 7th patrol: 27 June – 8 August 1942; 8th patrol: a. 6 September – 26 October 1942; b. 27 – 29 December 1942; 9th patrol: 3 January – 17 February 1943
- Victories: 22 merchant ships sunk (102,697 GRT); 2 auxiliary warships sunk (5,700 GRT); 2 merchant ships damaged (13,386 GRT)

German submarine U-201 was a Type VIIC U-boat of the Kriegsmarine in World War II.

The submarine was laid down on 20 January 1940 by Friedrich Krupp Germaniawerft yard at Kiel as yard number 630, launched on 7 December 1940, and commissioned on 25 January 1941 under the command of Kapitänleutnant Adalbert Schnee. Attached to the 1st U-boat Flotilla, she made nine successful patrols in the North Atlantic, the last two under the command of Oberleutnant zur See Günther Rosenberg. She was a member of eight wolfpacks.

She was sunk on 17 February 1943 in the North Atlantic, by depth charges from a British warship. All 49 hands were lost.

== Design ==
German Type VIIC submarines were preceded by the shorter Type VIIB submarines. U-201 had a displacement of 769 tonnes (757 long tons) when at the surface and 871 tonnes (857 long tons) while submerged. She had a total length of 67.10 m (220 ft 2 in), a pressure hull length of 50.50 m (165 ft 8 in), a beam of 6.20 m (20 ft 4 in), a height of 9.60 m (31 ft 6 in), and a draught of 4.74 m (15 ft 7 in). The submarine was powered by two Germaniawerft F46 four-stroke, six-cylinder supercharged diesel engines producing a total of 2,800 to 3,200 metric horsepower (2,060 to 2,350 kW; 2,760 to 3,160 shp) for use while surfaced, two AEG GU 460/8–27 double-acting electric motors producing a total of 750 metric horsepower (550 kW; 740 shp) for use while submerged. She had two shafts and two 1.23 m (4 ft) propellers. The boat was capable of operating at depths of up to 230 metres (750 ft).

The submarine had a maximum surface speed of 17.7 knots (32.8 km/h; 20.4 mph) but a maximum submerged speed of only 7.6 knots (14.1 km/h; 8.7 mph). When submerged, the boat could operate for 80 nautical miles (150 km) at 4 knots (7.4 km/h; 4.6 mph); when surfaced, she could travel 8,500 nautical miles (15,700 km) at 10 knots (19 km/h; 12 mph).

U-201 was armed with five 53.3 cm (21 in) torpedo tubes (four fitted at the bow and one at the stern) and fourteen torpedoes, one 8.8 cm (3.46 in) SK C/35 naval gun with 220 rounds, and a 2 cm (0.79 in) C/30 cannon for anti-aircraft defence. The boat had a complement of between forty-four and sixty.

== Service history ==
=== First patrol ===
U-201 departed Kiel for her first patrol on 22 April 1941. Her route took her across the North Sea, through the gap separating Iceland and the Faroe Islands and into the Atlantic Ocean. Her first 'kill' was Capulet which she sank on 2 May south of Iceland. The ship had already been torpedoed by U-552; her back was broken, she had caught fire and been abandoned.

Moving east of Greenland, she sank Greglia on 9 May and damaged Empire Cloud on the same day.

She was attacked over five hours by three escorts from Convoy OB 318. A total of 99 depth charges were dropped, severely damaging the boat, but she escaped at night. Damage to a fuel tank curtailed the patrol and it returned to Lorient in occupied France on 18 May.

=== Second patrol ===
The submarine's second foray passed without major incident: starting on 8 June 1941, finishing on 19 July but in Brest. (For the rest of her career she would be based in this French Atlantic port).

=== Third patrol ===
U-201's third sortie began from Brest on 14 August 1941. On the 19th in mid-Atlantic she took part in a wolfpack attack on Convoy OG 71. Firing one spread of four torpedoes she hit the cargo ship Ciscar and passenger liner Aguila, which was carrying the Convoy Commodore and 86 other Royal Navy personnel. Both ships sank, and Aguila's sinking killed 152 of the 168 people aboard, including all but one of the naval staff.

U-201 continued with the concerted attack on OG 71, sinking the Irish Clonlara on 22 August and British merchants Aldergrove and Stork northwest of Lisbon on the 23rd, before returning to Brest on the 25th.

=== Fourth patrol ===
Success continued to accompany U-201. Having departed Brest on 14 September 1941 she sank Runa, Lissa and Rhineland, all on 21 September.

She then sank Cervantes on 27 September. This ship had four survivors from Ciscar on board. She also accounted for HMS Springbank a Fighter catapult ship about 430 nmi (800 km; 490 mi) west southwest of Cape Clear, southern Ireland on the same date. One torpedo was seen to pass between Springbank and Leadgate, but two others sealed the British vessel's fate.

The submarine's final victim on this patrol was Margareta, which went down southwest of Cape Clear.

U-201 returned to Brest on 30 September.

=== Fifth patrol ===
U-201's fifth sortie into western North Atlantic lasted 49 days without finding any targets.

=== Sixth patrol ===
U-201 commenced her sixth and longest patrol on 24 March 1942. Having departed Brest and crossed the Atlantic, she damaged the neutral Argentinian merchant Victoria about 300 nmi (560 km; 350 mi) east of Cape Hatteras, North Carolina on 18 April. The crew, realizing that the ship, despite the torpedo strike, was not settling, decided to stay on board. The U-boat men saw the neutrality markings only after a second torpedo was fired and the submarine had surfaced. Victoria's complement then abandoned the ship; U-201 reported its mistake to the BdU (U-boat headquarters) which ordered it to clear the area, which it did.

USS Owl, an American minesweeper towing the barge YOG-38, picked up Victoria's distress signals and sent a boarding party across to the tanker to effect repairs. The ship reached New York on 21 April and after much legal wrangling, was repaired and requisitioned by the US government and returned to service in July. She survived the war.

Three more ships went to the bottom on this patrol - Bris on 21 April, SS San Jacinto (1903) and Derryheen, both on 22 April.

The boat returned to Brest on 21 May.

=== Seventh patrol ===
Patrol number seven was, in tonnage terms, the boat's most successful. Departing Brest on 27 June 1942, she operated in the eastern north Atlantic, sinking the Blue Star Liner Avila Star 90 nmi (170 km; 100 mi) east of São Miguel in the Azores on 6 July. Casualties were increased when a torpedo exploded under a lifeboat that had just been lowered from the ship and the remaining lifeboats became separated, one spending 20 days at sea before being rescued and another being lost without trace.

Another victim, Cortuna, was sunk about 383 nmi (709 km; 441 mi) west of Madeira on 12 July after U-116 had already hit her. The Siris was sunk the same day hit with a torpedo and then with 100 rounds from the deck gun.

Three more ships were sunk before the submarine returned to Brest on 8 August.

=== Eighth patrol ===
The eight patrol was off South America sinking three ships. The Liberty ship SS John Carter Rose, was sunk about 620 nmi (1,150 km; 710 mi) east of Trinidad, only after a chase lasting 32 hours, 290 nmi (540 km; 330 mi) and seven torpedoes on 8 October 1942. Also involved was U-202.

Another, Flensburg, was sunk the following day about 500 nmi (930 km; 580 mi) from Suriname. The 48 survivors were spotted by a Yugoslavian merchant ship, but when they learned of the prospect of an unescorted Atlantic crossing to Durban, opted to remain in their lifeboats until they reached the mouth of the River Marowijine between French Guiana and Suriname.

=== Ninth patrol and loss ===
The boat left Brest for the last time on 3 January 1943 and headed for the eastern coast of Canada. As part of the Taifun group attacking Convoy ONS 165 defended by Escort Group B6 she was sunk in position 50°50′N 40°50′W by depth charges from the British destroyer HMS Viscount east of Newfoundland. All 49 men died. It had been thought that U-201 was sunk after depth charges and ramming by the British destroyer HMS Fame, also of Escort Group B6, east of Newfoundland on 17 February 1943 but that was U-69.

=== Wolfpacks ===
U-201 took part in eight wolfpacks, namely:

- West (8 – 13 May 1941)
- Kurfürst (16 – 20 June 1941)
- Störtebecker (5 – 19 November 1941)
- Gödecke (19 – 25 November 1941)
- Letzte Ritter (25 November - 4 December 1941)
- Hai (3 – 20 July 1942)
- Falke (8 – 19 January 1943)
- Haudegen (19 January - 15 February 1943)

== Summary of raiding history ==
| Date | Ship Name | Nationality | Tonnage (GRT) | Fate | Position | Convoy | Deaths |
|---|---|---|---|---|---|---|---|
| 2 May 1941 | Capulet | United Kingdom | 8,190 | Sunk | 60°00′N 16°00′W | HX-121 | 9 |
| 9 May 1941 | Empire Cloud* | United Kingdom | 5,969 | Damaged | 61°00′N 32°30′W | OB 318 | 0 |
| 9 May 1941 | Gregalia | United Kingdom | 5,802 | Sunk | 60°24′N 32°37′W | OB 318 | 0 |
| 19 August 1941 | Aguila | United Kingdom | 3,255 | Sunk | 49°23′N 17°56′W | OG 71 | 152 |
| 19 August 1941 | Ciscar | United Kingdom | 1,809 | Sunk | 49°10′N 17°40′W | OG 71 | 13 |
| 23 August 1941 | Aldergrove | United Kingdom | 1,974 | Sunk | 40°43′N 11°39′W | OG 71 | 1 |
| 23 August 1941 | Stork | United Kingdom | 787 | Sunk | 40°43′N 11°39′W | OG 71 | 19 |
| 21 September 1941 | Lissa | United Kingdom | 1,511 | Sunk | 47°00′N 22°00′W | OG 74 | 26 |
| 21 September 1941 | Rhineland | United Kingdom | 1,381 | Sunk | 47°00′N 22°00′W | OG 74 | 26 |
| 21 September 1941 | Runa | United Kingdom | 1,575 | Sunk | 46°20′N 22°23′W | OG 74 | 14 |
| 27 September 1941 | Cervantes | United Kingdom | 1,810 | Sunk | 48°37′N 20°01′W | HG-73 | 8 |
| 27 September 1941 | HMS Springbank | Royal Navy | 5,155 | Sunk | 49°09′N 20°10′W | HG-73 | 32 |
| 27 September 1941 | Margareta | United Kingdom | 3,103 | Sunk | 50°15′N 17°27′W | HG-73 | 0 |
| 18 April 1942 | Victoria | Argentina | 7,417 | Damaged | 36°41′N 68°48′W | | 0 |
| 21 April 1942 | Bris | Norway | 2,027 | Sunk | 33°35′N 69°38′W | | 5 |
| 22 April 1942 | Derryheen | United Kingdom | 7,217 | Sunk | 31°20′N 70°35′W | | 0 |
| 22 April 1942 | San Jacinto | United States | 6,069 | Sunk | 31°10′N 70°45′W | | 14 |
| 6 July 1942 | Avila Star | United Kingdom | 14,443 | Sunk | 38°04′N 22°48′W | | 84 |
| 12 July 1942 | Cortona | United Kingdom | 7,093 | Sunk | 32°45′N 24°45′W | OS-33 | 31 |
| 12 July 1942 | Siris | United Kingdom | 5,242 | Sunk | 31°20′N 24°48′W | OS-33 | 3 |
| 13 July 1942 | Sithonia | United Kingdom | 6,723 | Sunk | 29°00′N 25°00′W | OS-33 | 7 |
| 15 July 1942 | British Yeoman | United Kingdom | 6,990 | Sunk | 26°42′N 24°20′W | | 43 |
| 25 July 1942 | HMS Laertes | Royal Navy | 545 | Sunk | 06°00′N 14°17′W | | 19 |
| 2 October 1942 | Alcoa Transport | United States | 2,084 | Sunk | 09°03′N 60°10′W | | 6 |
| 8 October 1942 | John Carter Rose | United States | 7,191 | Sunk | 10°27′N 45°37′W | TRIN-15 | 8 |
| 9 October 1942 | Flensburg | Netherlands | 6,421 | Sunk | 10°45′N 46°48′W | | 0 |

*Later sunk by U-564.

== Bibliography ==
- Busch, Rainer; Röll, Hans-Joachim (1999). German U-boat commanders of World War II : a biographical dictionary. Translated by Brooks, Geoffrey. London, Annapolis, Md: Greenhill Books, Naval Institute Press. ISBN 1-55750-186-6.
- Busch, Rainer; Röll, Hans-Joachim (1999). Deutsche U-Boot-Verluste von September 1939 bis Mai 1945 [German U-boat losses from September 1939 to May 1945]. Der U-Boot-Krieg (in German). Vol. IV. Hamburg, Berlin, Bonn: Mittler. ISBN 3-8132-0514-2.
- Edwards, Bernard (1996). Dönitz and the Wolfpacks - The U-boats at War. Cassell. p. 152. ISBN 0-304-35203-9.
- Gröner, Erich; Jung, Dieter; Maass, Martin (1991). U-boats and Mine Warfare Vessels. German Warships 1815–1945. Vol. 2. Translated by Thomas, Keith; Magowan, Rachel. London: Conway Maritime Press. ISBN 0-85177-593-4.
- Helgason, Guðmundur. "The Type VIIC boat U-201". German U-boats of WWII - uboat.net.
- Hofmann, Markus. "U 201". Deutsche U-Boote 1935-1945 - u-boot-archiv.de (in German).
