= MV Tønsberg =

Ro/ro ship

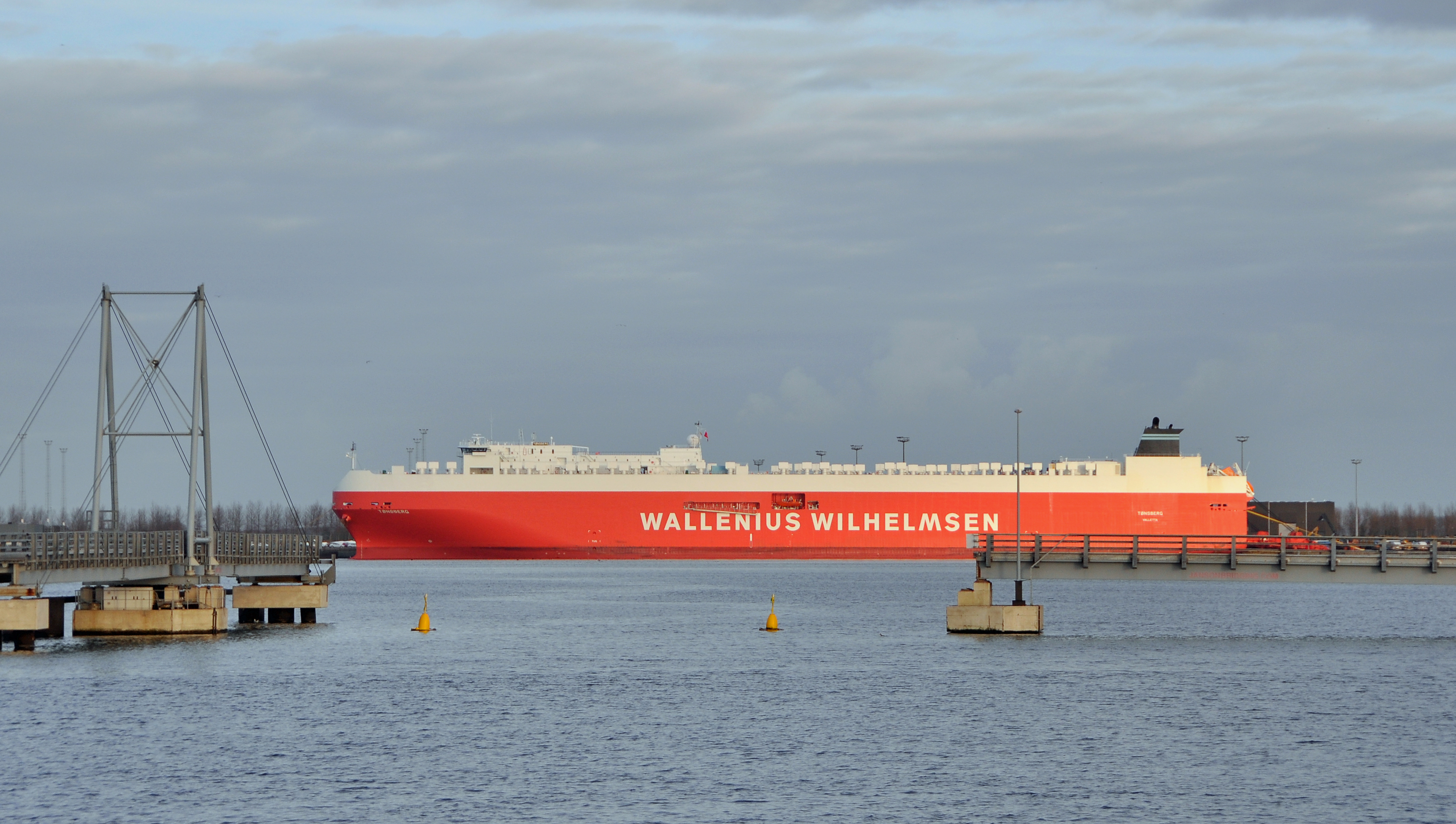
- Tønsberg in the port of Bruges-Zeebrugge

History
- Name: Tønsberg
- Namesake: Tønsberg
- Owner: Wilh. Wilhelmsen
- Port of registry: Valletta, Malta
- Builder: Mitsubishi Heavy Industries, Nagasaki, Japan
- Launched: 2 October 2010
- Identification: IMO number: 9515383; MMSI number: 249904000; Call sign: 9HA2066

General characteristics
- Class & type: Mark V-class Ro-Ro
- Tonnage: 75,251 GT; 41,820 DWT
- Length: 265 metres (869 ft)
- Beam: 32.27 metres (105.9 ft)
- Decks: Six fixed decks; three hoistable decks
- Installed power: MAN B&W 7L70ME engine providing 20,100 kilowatts (27,000 hp)
- Propulsion: 7.3m diameter 6-bladed propeller; two 2,500-kW Kawasaki thrusters (one stern, one bow)
- Speed: 20.25 knots (37.50 km/h; 23.30 mph)
- Capacity: 138,000 cubic metres (4,900,000 cu ft); 5,990 cars

MV Tønsberg is a roll-on/roll-off ship owned by Wilh. Wilhelmsen. When built, it was the largest RORO ship in the world.

== Specification ==
- Dimensions: MV Tønsberg is 265 m (869 ft) length overall and 32.26 m (105.8 ft) wide, and has 11 m (36 ft) draught and 46 m (151 ft) of air draught. Gross tonnage is 76,500 gt. Capacity, at 5,990 cars, is 5% – 7% higher than Mark IV roro ships.
- Decks: Six fixed decks and three hoistable ones (4B, 6 and 8, lifted by electric winches). The main deck can take loads 7.1 m high – more than other vessels – allowing very large loads. The total deck space is 50,335 m^{2} and cargo volume is 138,000 m³. Internal ramps are 8 metres wide; The weather deck (which can be used for outsize or unusual loads, such as wind turbine blades) also has a 4m wide ramp from below, to reduce the need for cranes.
- Stern ramp: The stern ramp is 12 m (39 ft) wide and can take loads of 505 tonnes.
- Design: Hull form has been improved, so compared to previous ships it will use 15 – 20% less fuel per unit of cargo. Stability has been improved, to reduce the need for ballast water. There is a double bottom and Deck 5 is also watertight.
- Propulsion: 7-cylinder MAN B&W engine, which has been derated from 22,890 kW to 20,100 kW MCR at 108rpm; (although normal output in service is 18,090 kW), driving a 7.3 m (24 ft) diameter 6-bladed propeller; plus two 2,500 kW Kawasaki thrusters (one each at the bow and the stern). Service speed is 20.25 knots.

== History ==
MV Tønsberg is the fourth Wilhelmsen ship to carry this name; it's named after the Norwegian coastal town where Wilhelmsen was founded in 1861. Its construction coincided with the 150th anniversary of Wilh. Wilhelmsen line. It is the first in a series of four "Mark V" ships, built in 2010-2011 by Mitsubishi Heavy Industries shipyard in Nagasaki, in Japan. The second ship of the class, Parsifal, was delivered in September 2011.

In June 2012, Tønsberg was awarded "Ship of the Year 2011" by the Japan Society of Naval Architects and Ocean Engineers, recognising its efficiency and environmental compatibility.
