= Aguila =

Águila or Aguila is Spanish for "eagle". It may refer to:

== Places ==
- El Aguila, Valle del Cauca, a town and municipality in Colombia
- Aguila, Arizona, United States

== Ships ==
- Chilean ship Águila, ships of the Chilean Navy
  - Chilean brigantine Águila (1796), the first ship of the Chilean Navy
- SS Aguila (1909), a British passenger ship sunk in 1915
- SS Aguila (1916), a British passenger ship sunk in 1941

== Firearms ==
- .17 PMC/Aguila, a type of ammunition cartridge
- Aguila Ammunition, a Mexican Ammunition manufacturer

== Other uses ==
- Águila, a beer made by Bavaria Brewery in Colombia
- C.D. Águila, a Salvadoran football club
- Compañía Mexicana de Petróleo El Aguila SA, a former Mexican oil company, now Pemex
- El Aguila, a character in the Marvel Comics universe
- Mr. Águila (born 1978), Mexican professional wrestler
- Aguila (film), a 1980 Filipino film

== People ==
- Aguila Saleh Issa (born 1944), Libyan jurist and politician
- Chris Aguila (born 1979), American major league baseball player
- Cynthia del Águila (born 1959), Guatemalan teacher and politician
- Piedad Martínez del Águila, Spanish killer
- Juan del Águila (1545–1602), Spanish general
- Roberto Solis or Pancho Aguila (born 1945), American fugitive and poet

== See also ==
- Agila (disambiguation)
- Aquila (disambiguation)
- Aguilar (disambiguation)
- Águila o sol, a 1937 Mexican film
- Orden del Águila Azteca, the highest decoration awarded to foreigners in Mexico
- Patrulla Águila, an aerobatic demonstration team of the Spanish Air Force
- Piedra del Águila Dam, a dam on the Limay River, Patagonia, Argentina
- Pico del Águila, a Mexican mountain peak near Mexico City
- Águila Islet, islet belonging to Chile and the southernmost point of South America
