= List of shipwrecks in August 1941 =

The list of shipwrecks in August 1941 includes all ships sunk, foundered, grounded, or otherwise lost during August 1941.

== 1 August ==
List of shipwrecks: 1 August 1941
Ship	State	Description
B23 Igea	Regia Marina	World War II: The auxiliary minesweeper (158 GRT) was shelled and set afire 5 nautical miles (9.3 km) west of Ghemines (32°35′N 19°56′E) by HMS Regent (Royal Navy). As she was carrying gasoline as her cargo, the ship was quickly abandoned by her crew, drifted and ran aground. She was boarded, searched and then sunk by gunfire. There were no casualties.
Kwaibo	United Kingdom	The 396 GRT coaster ran aground at Eket Bar in the Calabar River, Nigeria and was wrecked.
TK-123	Soviet Navy	World War II: The G-5-class motor torpedo boat was sunk in the Baltic Sea off Cape Domesnes, Latvia by Kriegsmarine R boats.
Trident	United Kingdom	World War II: The 4,317 GRT cargo ship on a trip from Montreal for Tyne with a cargo of grain, was bombed and damaged in the North Sea 4 nautical miles (7.4 km) off the mouth of the River Tyne by Luftwaffe aircraft. She sank the next day. Her 42 crew survived.

== 2 August ==
List of shipwrecks: 2 August 1941
Ship	State	Description
Loodsboot No.12	Netherlands	World War II: The pilot vessel was bombed and sunk in the North Sea west of Den Helder, North Holland by Royal Air Force aircraft.
Rozenburg	Netherlands	The cargo ship collided with Murena (Netherlands) in the Atlantic Ocean at Halifax, Nova Scotia, Canada and sank.
S-6	Soviet Navy	World War II: The S-class submarine departed Tallinn to patrol off Bornholm, not heard from since. Later established that she was sunk in the Baltic Sea off Öland, Sweden by a mine (55°52′56″N 17°10′43″E).
S-11	Soviet Navy	World War II: The S-class submarine struck a mine in the Soela Strait, Baltic Sea and sank with the loss of 45 of her crew. She was raised in 1955, and scrapped 1957–1958.
H 855 Stoomloodsvaartuig 12	Kriegsmarine	The 488 GRT guard ship, former Dutch pilot boat, was bombed and sunk by 4 Bristol Blenheim bombers off Katwijk (52°54.7′N 4°34.8′E) with a loss of 5 crew.
Tembien	Regia Marina	World War II: The Adua-class submarine was rammed and sunk in the Mediterranean Sea off Tunis, Tunisia (36°12′N 12°40′E) by HMS Hermione (Royal Navy) with the loss of all 42 crew.

== 3 August ==
List of shipwrecks: 3 August 1941
Ship	State	Description
Desmoulea	United Kingdom	World War II: The tanker already disabled by a torpedo attack in January, was bombed and severely damaged at Suez, Egypt by Heinkel He 111 aircraft of II Staffeln, Kampfgeschwader 26, Luftwaffe. She was subsequently used as a hulk for the remainder of the war.
Escaut	Belgium	World War II: The cargo ship (1,087 GRT) was torpedoed and sunk in Attaka Bay in the Gulf of Suez by Heinkel He 111 aircraft of II./KG 26, Luftwaffe with the loss of three of her crew.
Elisa	Italy	World War II: The coaster (216 GRT, 1903) was bombed and sunk in the Mediterranean Sea off Benghazi, Libya by Royal Air Force aircraft.
T-212 Shtag	Soviet Navy	World War II: The Fugas-class minesweeper hit a mine and sank in the western part of the Soela Strait as she was bringing in Shch-322. Four crew were lost.
U-401	Kriegsmarine	World War II: The Type VIIC submarine was depth charged and sunk in the Atlantic Ocean south west of Ireland (50°27′N 19°50′W) by HMS Hydrangea and HMS Wanderer (both Royal Navy) and HMS St Albans (Royal Norwegian Navy) with the loss of all 44 crew.
Unnamed	Kriegsmarine	World War II: The Siebel ferry was bombed and sunk in the Black Sea by Soviet Air Force aircraft and Ilyushin DB-3 aircraft of the Soviet Naval Air Force.

== 4 August ==
List of shipwrecks: 4 August 1941
Ship	State	Description
AC-6	United Kingdom	World War II: The floating crane barge was scuttled as a blockship in Skerry Sound, Scapa Flow.
Frankfurt	Germany	World War II: The blockade runner was intercepted in the Atlantic Ocean west of the Azores, Portugal by HMS Covina (Royal Navy) and was scuttled by her crew. There were no casualties. Twenty-Six of her crew were rescued and captured by HMS Covina. A second boatload refused to be picked up and managed to escape capture. The twenty men aboard were later rescued by Norden (Panama) and the destroyer NRP Vouga (Portuguese Navy).
Robert Max	United Kingdom	World War II: The fishing trawler was shelled and sunk in the Atlantic Ocean (36°47′N 21°15′W) by U-126 (Kriegsmarine). Her six crew were rescued.
Sumatra	Netherlands	World War II: The fishing vessel struck a mine and sank in the Baltic Sea north of Kolberg, Germany.
Tunisia	United Kingdom	World War II: The 4,337 GRT cargo ship on a trip from Pepel for Workington with manganese and iron ore, was bombed and sunk in the Atlantic Ocean (53°53′N 18°10′W) by Focke-Wulf Fw 200 aircraft of the Luftwaffe with the loss of 38 of her 43 crew.

== 5 August ==
List of shipwrecks: 5 August 1941
Ship	State	Description
Belgravian	United Kingdom	World War II: Convoy SL 81: The 3,336 GRT cargo ship on a trip from Port Harcourt for Hull with a cargo of tin ore and groundnuts, was torpedoed and sunk in the Atlantic Ocean west of Ireland (53°03′N 16°54′W) by U-372 (Kriegsmarine) with the loss of three of her 50 crew. Survivors were rescued by HMS Bluebell (Royal Navy)
Cape Rodney	United Kingdom	World War II: Convoy SL 81: The 4,512 GRT cargo ship on a voyage from Lagos for London with a cargo of manganese ore and groundnuts, was torpedoed and damaged in the Atlantic Ocean (53°26′N 15°40′W) by U-75 (Kriegsmarine). She was taken in tow by HMS Zwarte Zee (Royal Navy) but sank on 9 August at 52°44′N 11°41′W. Her 39 crew were rescued by HMS Hydrangea and HMS Zinnia (both Royal Navy).
Harlingen	United Kingdom	World War II: Convoy SL 81: The 5,415 GRT cargo ship on a trip from Lagos for Liverpool with a cargo of foodstuffs, was torpedoed and sunk in the Atlantic Ocean (53°26′N 15°40′W) by U-75 (Kriegsmarine) with the loss of three of her 42 crew. Survivors were rescued by HMS Hydrangea (Royal Navy).
Kumasian	United Kingdom	World War II: Convoy SL 81: The 4,922 GRT cargo ship on a trip from Lagos for London with general cargo, was torpedoed and sunk in the Atlantic Ocean (53°26′N 15°40′W) by U-74 (Kriegsmarine) with the loss of one of the 60 people on board. Survivors were rescued by HMS La Malouine (Royal Navy).
Swiftpool	United Kingdom	World War II: Convoy SL 81 The 5,205 GRT cargo ship on a trip from Pepel for Middlesbrough with a cargo of iron ore, was torpedoed and sunk in the Atlantic Ocean west of Ireland (53°03′N 16°00′W) by U-372 (Kriegsmarine) with the loss of 42 of her 44 crew. Survivors were rescued by HMS Bluebell (Royal Navy)
T-201 Zaryad	Soviet Navy	World War II: The Fugas-class minesweeper struck a mine and sank in the Baltic Sea, north off Ristna Lighthouse, while accompanying patrol boats Sneg and Tsiklon on a minelaying mission.

== 6 August ==
List of shipwrecks: 6 August 1941
Ship	State	Description
Aberhill	United Kingdom	World War II: Convoy FS 559: The cargo ship ran aground in a gale on Haisborough Sands, Norfolk (52°54′30″N 1°43′30″E), broke her back and was wrecked.
Afon Towy	United Kingdom	World War II: Convoy FS 559: The 178-foot (54 m), 684-ton coaster ran aground in a gale on Haisborough Sands and was wrecked.
HMT Agate	Royal Navy	World War II: Convoy FS 559: The 157.3-foot (47.9 m), 433-ton Gem-class anti-submarine naval trawler ran aground on Haisborough Sands in a gale and was lost with all 26 crew, or her captain and 17 crew, with 8 rescued.
Betty Hindley	United Kingdom	World War II: Convoy FS 559: The collier ran aground in a gale on Haisborough Sands and was wrecked. She was on a voyage from Blyth, Northumberland to London.
Bombardiere	Italy	World War II: The 613 GRT coaster was torpedoed and sunk in the Mediterranean Sea 6 nautical miles (11 km) off Fregene (41°47′N 12°06′E) by HNLMS O 24 (Royal Netherlands Navy).
Deerwood	United Kingdom	World War II: Convoy FS 559: The cargo shipran aground on Haisborough Sands in a gale and was wrecked.
Florvåg	Norway	The ferry sank off Gradval.
Gallois	United Kingdom	World War II: Convoy FS 559: The collier ran aground on Haisborough Sands (52°54′30″N 1°43′30″E) in a gale and was wrecked. Her crew were rescued.
Nita	Italy	World War II: The 6,813 GRT cargo ship bound for Tripoli with a cargo of gasoline in drums, vehicles and ammunition, was torpedoed and sunk in the Mediterranean Sea 20 nautical miles (37 km) south west of Lampedusa (35°15′N 12°17′E) by Fairey Swordfish aircraft of 830 Squadron, Fleet Air Arm.
Oxshott	United Kingdom	World War II: Convoy FS 559: The cargo ship ran aground on Haisborough Sands in a gale and was wrecked.
PS-70	Soviet Navy	World War II: The 558 GRT despatch vessel, former fishing trawler Kapitan Voronin, on a return trip from Iokanga for Polyarny with mail and passengers, was torpedoed and sunk in the Barents Sea 7 nautical miles (13 km) off Teriberka (at 69°18′N 35°00′E) by U-652 (Kriegsmarine). There were only 11 survivors out of approximately 60 men on board.
Taara	United Kingdom	World War II: Convoy FS 559: The collier ran aground on Haisborough Sands in a gale and was wrecked.

== 7 August ==
List of shipwrecks: 7 August 1941
Ship	State	Description
Amiral Lacaze	France	World War II: The tug was bombed and sunk at Famagusta, Cyprus by Luftwaffe aircraft.She was later refloated and repaired.
VT-538 Axel Carl	Soviet Navy	World War II: The cargo ship (2,170 GRT), a former Danish ship confiscated on 22 June 1941, struck a mine on a trip from Leningrad for Tallinn with military cargo and quickly sank about 9 nautical miles (17 km) west of Vaindloo (59°48′N 26°04′E), with a loss of eight of her crew.
HMS MMS 39	Royal Navy	World War II: The MMS-class minesweeper (165 GRT) struck a mine and sank in the Thames Estuary. Three of her 20 crew died.
Margherita Madre	Regia Marina	World War II: The requisitioned 305 GRT motor schooner (V. 59) was shelled and sunk in the Mediterranean Sea 8 nautical miles (15 km) southwest off Anzio (41°23′N 12°28′E) by HNLMS O 24 (Royal Netherlands Navy).
Venus	Germany	World War II: The cargo ship struck a mine and sank in the North Sea off Borkum, Germany.

== 8 August ==
List of shipwrecks: 8 August 1941
Ship	State	Description
Cordene	United Kingdom	World War II: Convoy FN 503: The 2,345 GRT cargo ship on a passage from Southend for Methil in ballast, was bombed and sunk in the North Sea (53°00′32″N 1°48′30″E) by Luftwaffe aircraft. Her crew were rescued.
Karl Marx	Soviet Navy	World War II: The Izyaslav-class destroyer was bombed and heavily damaged off Loksa by Junkers Ju 88 aircraft of 806 Küstenfliegergruppe. Due to impossibility of evacuation, the destroyer was scuttled on 11 August by Soviet torpedo boats. 38 crew were lost.
TShch-76 Val	Soviet Navy	The auxiliary minesweeper was bombed and sunk by Luftwaffe aircraft.
MO-410	Soviet Navy	The MO-2-class patrol vessel was bombed and sunk by Luftwaffe aircraft in Hara Bay.

== 9 August ==
List of shipwrecks: 9 August 1941
Ship	State	Description
Dagny I	Norway	World War II: The 1,392 GRT cargo ship on a trip from Svalbard for Kirkwall with passengers and coal, was bombed and damaged in the North Sea (61°40′N 6°10′W) by Luftwaffe aircraft. She was taken in tow by HMT Leicester City (Royal Navy) but sank the next day with the loss of six of the 74 people on board. Survivors were rescued by Wastwater (United Kingdom).
Gertrud III	Germany	World War II: The 210 GRT motor schooner struck a mine and sank in the Baltic Sea off Windau with a loss of one crew.
HMS MGB 62	Royal Navy	The BPB 70'-class gunboat collided with HMS MGB 67 (Royal Navy) and sank in the North Sea.
Ocean Victor	United Kingdom	World War II: The 202 GRT steam fishing trawler was torpedoed and sunk in the Atlantic Ocean south east of Iceland (62°33′N 14°07′W) by U-206 (Kriegsmarine) with the loss of all thirteen crew.

== 10 August ==
List of shipwrecks: 10 August 1941
Ship	State	Description
M-1102 H.A.W. Müller	Kriegsmarine	World War II: The minesweeper was sunk in the North Sea off Lindesnes, Norway by an air-dropped torpedo.
SP-11	Soviet Union	World War II: The sea-going tug towing unfinished cruiser Frunze from Nikolaev to Sevastopol was bombed and sunk by Luftwaffe aircraft off Ochakov. Raised, repaired and returned to service after the war.
SKR-12 Tuman	Soviet Navy	World War II: The 574 GRT guard ship, former steam fishing trawler Lebedka, was shelled and sunk off Tsypnavolok (69°33′6″N 33°40′20″E) by Z4 Richard Beitzen, Z10 Hans Lody and Z16 Friedrich Eckoldt (all Kriegsmarine). Fifteen of her crew were killed.
U-144	Kriegsmarine	World War II: The Type IID submarine was torpedoed and sunk in the Baltic Sea off Hiiumaa, Estonia (approximately 53°N 19°W) by Shch-307 (Soviet Navy) with the loss of all 23 crew.
Zhemchug	Soviet Navy	World War II: The Zemchug-class patrol vessel was torpedoed and sunk in the White Sea west of the Kanin Peninsula (at 68°39′N 42°07′E) by U-451 (Kriegsmarine) with the loss of all 61 crew.

== 11 August ==
List of shipwrecks: 11 August 1941
Ship	State	Description
Altai	Soviet Navy	World War II: The requisitioned 559 GRT coaster (VT-536) was bombed and sunk by Luftwaffe aircraft in Hari Strait, off Vormsi.
California	Regia Marina	World War II: The hospital ship was torpedoed and sunk at Syracuse, Sicily by Fairey Swordfish aircraft of 830 Squadron, Fleet Air Arm. She was refloated in 1949 and scrapped.
Cito	Norway	World War II: The 124 GRT coaster on a trip from Høyanger for Eydehavn struck a mine and sank in Sognefjord.
Empire Hurst	United Kingdom	World War II: Convoy HG 70: The 2,852 GRT cargo ship on a trip from Aguilas for Barrow with a cargo of iron ore, straggled behind the convoy. She was bombed and sunk off Cabo de San Vicente (36°48′N 9°50′W) by Focke-Wulf Fw 200 aircraft of I Staffeln, Kampfgeschwader 40, Luftwaffe with the loss of 26 of her 35 crew. Survivors were rescued by HMT Lady Hogarth (Royal Navy).
Issa	Soviet Navy	The auxiliary river gunboat was sunk on this date.
Plyussa	Soviet Navy	The auxiliary river gunboat was sunk on this date.
Sir Russell	United Kingdom	World War II: The 1,548 GRT cargo ship on a passage from Sunderland for Southampton with a cargo of coal, was torpedoed and sunk in the English Channel 6 nautical miles (11 km) east-northeast of Dungeness, Kent by S-49 (Kriegsmarine). Her crew were rescued.
Surop	Soviet Navy	The Ristna-class auxiliary minelayer struck a mine and sank off Kuivastu.
T-213 Krambol	Soviet Navy	World War II: The Fugas-class minesweeper was sunk by mines in the Baltic Sea off Juminda Peninsula.
Zhemchuzin	Soviet Navy	World War II: The Project SB-37-class monitor was severely damaged by German tanks and field artillery on the Dnepr River. She was scuttled the next day at Voronovka.

== 12 August ==
List of shipwrecks: 12 August 1941
Ship	State	Description
A 14	Royal Navy	World War II: The lighter struck a mine and sank at Tobruk, Libya.
HMT Express	Royal Navy	World War II: The auxiliary patrol vessel struck a mine and sank in the North Sea off Whitstable, Kent.
Ledokol No.5	Soviet Union	World War II: The icebreaker struck a mine and sank in the Black Sea.
Novorossiysk	Soviet Union	World War II: The cargo ship was bombed and damaged in the Gulf of Odesa by Luftwaffe aircraft and was beached.
Peredovoy	Soviet Navy	The auxiliary river gunboat was sunk on this date.
HMS Picotee	Royal Navy	World War II: Convoy ON 5: The Flower-class corvette was torpedoed and sunk in the Atlantic Ocean south of Iceland (at 62°00′N 16°01′W) by U-586 (Kriegsmarine) with the loss of all 71 crew.

== 13 August ==
List of shipwrecks: 13 August 1941
Ship	State	Description
Akhti	Soviet Navy	The auxiliary river gunboat was sunk on this date.
Kephallinia	Greece	The auxiliary ship foundered in the Mediterranean Sea off Alexandria, Egypt. Her crew rescued by HMS Hero (Royal Navy).
HMS LCT 14	Royal Navy	World War II: The LCT 1-class landing craft tank struck a mine and sank in the Mediterranean Sea off Tobruk, Libya.
TShch-41	Soviet Navy	World War II: The auxiliary minesweeper was shelled and sunk in the Gulf of Finland north of Tallinn by S-26, S-28, S-39, and S-40 (all Kriegsmarine). 23 of her crew were taken prisoners.
No. 89	Soviet Navy	The auxiliary minesweeper was lost on this date.
Polina Osipenko	Soviet Union	World War II: The cargo ship was bombed and sunk in the Black Sea (46°36′N 31°40′E) by Luftwaffe aircraft with the loss of nine lives. She was carrying more than 1,000 passengers.
U-1	Soviet Navy	The G-5-class motor torpedo boat on a passage from Ochakov for Nikolaev was heavily damaged by German artillery and was scuttled by her crew.
U-2 Proletariy Ukrainy	Soviet Navy	The Sh-4-class motor torpedo boat on a passage from Ochakov for Nikolaev was heavily damaged by German artillery and was scuttled by her crew.
Sjoborg	Faroe Islands	World War II: The fishing trawler struck a mine and sank in the Atlantic Ocean (61°31′N 5°40′W) whilst fishing in a prohibited area.
Tralshik	Soviet Navy	World War II: The minesweeper struck a mine and sank in the Gulf of Finland.

== 14 August ==
List of shipwrecks: 14 August 1941
Ship	State	Description
Australind	United Kingdom	World War II: The 5,020 GRT cargo ship on a passage from Adelaide for United Kingdom via the Panama Canal, was shelled and sunk with explosive charges in the Pacific Ocean (4°13′S 91°03′W) by Komet (Kriegsmarine) with the loss of three of her 45 crew. Survivors were taken as prisoners of war.
Kharkov	Soviet Union	World War II: The cargo ship was scuttled at Nikolayev by the Red Army.
Lotte Halm	Germany	World War II: The 1,198 GRT cargo ship on a trip from Sundsvall for Papenburg with a cargo of sawn timber was bombed, machine-gunned and set on fire in the North Sea north of Borkum by 3 Bristol Blenheim bombers of Coastal Command, Royal Air Force. The salvage attempts failed, and the ship was abandoned and eventually sank the next day. Four crew were lost in the attack.
USS PC-457	United States Navy	The patrol craft (125 GRT) collided with Norluna (United States) and sank 22 miles north of San Juan, Puerto Rico with the loss of two crew.
Sud	Yugoslavia	World War II: Convoy HG 70: The 2,589 GRT cargo ship on a passage from Gibraltar for Halifax in ballast, straggled behind the convoy. She was shelled and damaged in the Atlantic Ocean (41°00′N 17°41′W) by Guglielmo Marconi (Regia Marina) and then torpedoed and sunk by U-126 (Kriegsmarine). Her 33 crew were rescued by Alferrarede (Portugal).
Utena	Soviet Union	World War II: The 542 GRT refrigerated cargo ship travelling in a convoy from Kronstadt to Tallinn, struck a mine and sank in the Baltic Sea 7 nautical miles (13 km) north of Juminda Peninsula.
Vodnik	Soviet Navy	World War II: Soviet evacuation of Tallinn: The 1,251 GRT transport ship, former cargo vessel Pearu, struck a mine and sank off Juminda Peninsula (59°42′N 25°25′E).

== 15 August ==
List of shipwrecks: 15 August 1941
Ship	State	Description
Adua	Regia Marina	World War II: The requisitioned reefer ship (V. 25) (400 GRT) whilst sailing in convoy from Benghazi for Tripoli, was bombed and sunk in the Gulf of Sirte off Buerat el Hsum (31°31′N 15°42′E) by 5 Royal Air Force Blenheim bombers. There were 11 dead and 15 survivors.
Kretinga	Soviet Navy	World War II: The requisitioned 542 GRT refrigerated cargo ship (VT-554) deviated from a cleared channel during aerial attacks by Luftwaffe aircraft, struck a mine and sunk in the Gulf of Finland off Loksa (59°46′N 25°03′E) with the loss of all 24 hands.
Norderney	Nazi Germany	World War II: The cargo ship was intercepted in the Atlantic Ocean north east of the mouth of the Amazon by HMS Despatch and HMS Pretoria Castle (both Royal Navy) and was scuttled by her crew.
Peleş	Romania	World War II: The 5,708 GRT cargo ship on a passage for Varna in ballast, was torpedoed and sunk in the Black Sea north east of Cape Emine, Bulgaria (42°45.6′N 27°59.3′E) by Shch-211 (Soviet Navy) with the loss of five lives.
T-202 Buy	Soviet Navy	World War II: The Fugas-class minesweeper on a passage from Kronstadt for Tallinn struck a mine and sank off Juminda Peninsula.

== 16 August ==
List of shipwrecks: 16 August 1941
Ship	State	Description
Evangelistra	Italy	World War II: The steamboat was attacked and sunk in the Mediterranean Sea off Benghazi, Libya by HMS Torbay (Royal Navy).
Ness Point	United Kingdom	World War II: The tug was bombed and sunk at Lowestoft, Suffolk by Luftwaffe aircraft. She was refloated on 23 August. Subsequently repaired and returned to service.
OP-9	Soviet Navy	World War II: The sea-going tug was scuttled by her crew at Nikolaev during evacuation. Raised, repaired and returned to service after the war.

== 17 August ==
List of shipwrecks: 17 August 1941
Ship	State	Description
Haakon Jarl	Norway	World War II: The coaster was torpedoed and sunk in the Barents Sea (70°58′N 26°48′E by HMS Tigris (Royal Navy) with the loss of three of her crew.
Maddalena Odero	Italy	World War II: The 5,479 GRT cargo ship on a trip from Naples for Tripoli with a cargo of ammunition, was torpedoed and damaged in the Mediterranean Sea approximately 17 nautical miles (31 km) south of Lampedusa by HNLMS O 24 (Royal Netherlands Navy). She was taken in tow by Pegaso and Giuseppe Sirtori (both Regia Marina) and beached at Cala Croce. The ship was bombed and set afire the next day by 5 Bristol Blenheim aircraft of 105 Squadron, Royal Air Force, and subsequently exploded.
80	Soviet Navy	World War II: The patrol boat was torpedoed and sunk in the Baltic Sea off Tallinn, Estonia by S-58 (Kriegsmarine).

== 18 August ==
List of shipwrecks: 18 August 1941
Ship	State	Description
Boug	Soviet Union	World War II: The submarine depot ship was bombed and sunk at Kherson by Luftwaffe aircraft.
Longtaker	Panama	World War II: The 1,700 GRT cargo ship on a passage to Reykjavik with a cargo of timber and foodstuffs, was torpedoed and sunk in the Atlantic Ocean 300 nautical miles (560 km) south west of Iceland (61°26′N 30°50′W) by U-38 (Kriegsmarine) with a loss of 24 of her 27 crew. Survivors were rescued by USS Lansdale (United States Navy).
HMS P32	Royal Navy	World War II: The U-class submarine struck a mine and sank in the Mediterranean Sea north of Tripoli, Libya with the loss of 30 of her 32 crew.
HMS P33	Royal Navy	The U-class submarine was sunk by enemy action in the Mediterranean Sea with the loss of all 32 crew.
Panuco	United States	The cargo ship caught fire at Brooklyn, New York. She was declared a constructive total loss and scrapped.
T-503 Baikal	Soviet Navy	The auxiliary minesweeper (358 GRT) was bombed and sunk by the Luftwaffe aircraft off Ochakov (46°36′6″N 31°28′0″E).
Volochayevka	Soviet Navy	World War II: The requisitioned 3,817 GRT cargo ship was scuttled at Kherson by the Red Army. She was later raised by the Germans, repaired and entered service as Theoderich.

== 19 August ==
List of shipwrecks: 19 August 1941
Ship	State	Description
Aguila	United Kingdom	World War II: Convoy OG 71: The 3,255 GRT troopship on a trip from Liverpool for Gibraltar with general cargo, was torpedoed and sunk in the Atlantic Ocean (49°23′N 17°56′W) by U-201 (Kriegsmarine) with the loss of 152 of the 168 people on board. Survivors were rescued by Empire Oak (United Kingdom) and HMS Wallflower (Royal Navy). Aguila was on a voyage from Liverpool, Lancashire to Gibraltar.
Alva	United Kingdom	World War II: Convoy OG 71: The 1,584 GRT cargo ship on a trip from Glasgow for Lisbon with a cargo of coal, was torpedoed and sunk in the Atlantic Ocean (48°48′N 17°46′W) by U-559 (Kriegsmarine) with the loss on one of her 25 crew. Survivors were rescued by HMS Boreas (Royal Navy), Empire Oak and Clonlara (both United Kingdom).
Anglo Norse	United Kingdom	The tanker collided with Lanark (United Kingdom) and was damaged. Anglo Norse was on a voyage from Curaçao, Curaçao and Dependencies to the River Tyne. She completed her voyage.
HNoMS Bath	Royal Norwegian Navy	World War II: Convoy OG 71: The Wickes-class destroyer was torpedoed and sunk in the Atlantic Ocean south west of Ireland (approximately 49°N 17°W) by U-204 (Kriegsmarine) with the loss of 86 of her 128 crew. Survivors were rescued by HMS Hydrangea and HMS Wanderer (both Royal Navy).
Ciscar	United Kingdom	World War II: Convoy OG 71: The 1,809 GRT cargo ship on a trip from Bristol for Gibraltar with general cargo and government stores, was torpedoed and sunk in the Atlantic Ocean (49°10′N 17°40′W) by U-201 (Kriegsmarine) with the loss of thirteen of her 48 crew. Survivors were rescued by Petrel (United Kingdom).
Devon	United Kingdom	World War II: The cargo ship was shelled and sunk in the Pacific Ocean 200 nautical miles (370 km) south west of the Galápagos Islands, Ecuador (approximately 5°S 91°W) by Komet (Kriegsmarine). Her 144 passengers and crew were rescued and made prisoners of war.
Golden Grain	United Kingdom	World War II: The barge struck a mine and sank in the North Sea (51°35′18″N 1°03′18″E) with the loss of all three crew.
HMS LCT 12	Royal Navy	World War II: The LCT 1-class landing craft tank was bombed and sunk off Tobruk, Libya by Junkers Ju 87 aircraft of the Luftwaffe.
Merikaru	Soviet Navy	World War II: The icebreaker was sunk in the Baltic Sea by S-58 (Kriegsmarine) with the loss of all hands.
Raaf	Netherlands	The fishing trawler was fishing in the North Sea close to a German convoy when she was torpedoed by an English aircraft and sank with the loss of all ten hands.
RFA Sildra	Royal Fleet Auxiliary	World War II: The tanker was torpedoed and sunk in the Atlantic Ocean (5°30′N 12°50′W) by Enrico Tazzoli (Regia Marina). Her 40 crew were rescued.
HMT Thorbryn	Royal Navy	World War II: The naval whaler was towing two lighters. She was bombed and sunk in the Mediterranean Sea off Tobruk, Libya by Junkers Ju 87 aircraft of the Luftwaffe with the loss of nine of the 29 crew on the three vessels. Survivors were taken as prisoners of war.
Vidlista	Soviet Navy	World War II: The incomplete Project SB-57/Vidlista-class river monitor was scuttled at the 300 Yard, Kiev to avoid capture by the Germans.
TShch-80	Soviet Navy	The auxiliary minesweeper was torpedoed and sunk by S-58 (Kriegsmarine) off Moonsund.

== 20 August ==
List of shipwrecks: 20 August 1941
Ship	State	Description
Czestochowa	Poland	World War II: The cargo ship was torpedoed and sunk in the North Sea (53°11′30″N 1°06′00″E) by S-48 (Kriegsmarine) with the loss of a crew member.
Enotria	Italy	World War II: The cargo ship was torpedoed and sunk in the Mediterranean Sea 6 nautical miles (11 km) off Capo Vito, Sicily by HMS Upholder (Royal Navy) with the loss of two of her crew.
Esperia	Italy	World War II: The troopship was torpedoed and sunk in the Mediterranean Sea off Tripoli, Libya (33°03′N 13°03′E) by HMS Unique (Royal Navy) with the loss of 31 of the 1,170 people on board.
Halcon	Mexican Navy	The Halcon-class patrol craft sank on this date.
Juliet	United Kingdom	World War II: The fishing trawler was bombed and sunk in the Atlantic Ocean 30 nautical miles (56 km) south of the Old Head of Kinsale, County Cork, Ireland by Luftwaffe aircraft. Her crew were rescued.
HMT Lorinda	Royal Navy	The 140.2-foot (42.7 m), 348-ton minesweeping naval trawler caught fire in the engine room and sank in the Atlantic Ocean off Freetown, Sierra Leone (6°30′N 11°37′W). Her crew were rescued by HMT Balta (Royal Navy).
Evangelistria	Greece	World War II: The ship was shelled and sunk in the Aegean Sea off Cape Maleas by HMS Thrasher (Royal Navy).
Sibir	Soviet Navy	World War II: The requisitioned 3,767 GRT passenger-cargo ship (VT-514) with 1,500 people on board, was bombed and damaged by Junkers Ju 88 bombers off Rodsher. She was able to reach Gogland and disembark about 900 of her passengers. The ship was then taken into tow, but was bombed and damaged again, and subsequently sunk in the Baltic Sea off Seskar (60°02′N 28°17′E) while on her way to Kronstadt.
Solarris	Faroe Islands	World War II: The fishing trawler struck a mine and sank in the Atlantic Ocean off Seyðisfjörður, Iceland. Four of her crew were rescued.
Turbo	United Kingdom	World War II: The cargo ship was torpedoed and severely damaged by Axis aircraft at Port Said, Egypt.

== 21 August ==
List of shipwrecks: 21 August 1941
Ship	State	Description
Briansk	Soviet Union	World War II: The cargo ship was bombed and sunk in the Black Sea off Odesa by Luftwaffe aircraft.
Gloria in Excelsio Deo	Free France	World War II: The drifter was bombed and sunk at Southampton, Hampshire, United Kingdom by Luftwaffe aircraft. She was later raised, repaired, and returned to service.
Hogland	Finland	World War II: The cargo ship was torpedoed and sunk in the North Sea (58°16′N 4°48′E) by Rubis (Free French Naval Forces) with the loss of eight of her crew.
Leeni	Soviet Navy	World War II: Soviet evacuation of Tallinn: The requisitioned 1,842 GRT cargo ship (VT-503) whilst maneuvering to avoid enemy aircraft, struck a mine and sank north of Juminda Peninsula (59°49′N 25°29′E).
SAT-1 Ost	Kriegsmarine	World War II: The gunboat was damaged in the Baltic Sea by Artem and Surovyi (both Soviet Navy) and was beached. A crew member was killed. SAT-1 Ost was later repaired and returned to service.
Strombo	Italy	World War II: The tanker exploded and sank in Skaramanga Bay. 11 crew were wounded. She had been torpedoed on 10 July by HMS Torbay (Royal Navy) and was towed to Skaramanga, since then unloading and preparing repairs.

== 22 August ==
List of shipwrecks: 22 August 1941
Ship	State	Description
Cascade	Panama	The 1,853 GRT cargo ship on a trip from Rangoon for Calcutta caught fire and sank in the Bay of Bengal 37 nautical miles (69 km) off Sandeads, India.
Clonlara	Ireland	World War II: Convoy OG 71: The cargo ship was torpedoed and sunk in the Atlantic Ocean west of Aveiro, Portugal (40°43′N 11°39′W) by U-564 (Kriegsmarine) with the loss of eleven of her crew, and eight survivors from Alva (United Kingdom). Survivors were rescued by HMS Campion (Royal Navy).
Empire Oak	United Kingdom	World War II: Convoy HX 70 / Convoy OG 71: The Larch-class tug was torpedoed and sunk in the Atlantic Ocean (40°43′N 11°39′W) by U-564 (Kriegsmarine) with the loss of nineteen of the 38 people on board, which included survivors from Aguila and Alva (both United Kingdom). Survivors were rescued by HMS Campanula (Royal Navy).
Lussin	Regia Marina	World War II: The 1,753 GRT transport ship, travelling in a small convoy from Palermo for Tripoli was torpedoed and sunk in the Mediterranean Sea about 3 nautical miles (5.6 km) off Capo Vito, Sicily by HMS Upholder (Royal Navy) with a loss of 42 of her crew.
Ostpreußen	Germany	World War II: The 3,030 GRT cargo ship was torpedoed and sunk in the Arctic Ocean between Kirkenes and Tromsø by HMS Trident (Royal Navy) with a loss of 2 men.
Pomorie	Soviet Union	World War II: The cargo liner was sunk in the White Sea off Kandalaksha by a Soviet mine with the loss of 62 of the 64 people on board, 32 crew and 30 passengers.
HMS Tonbridge	Royal Navy	World War II: The net laying ship was bombed and sunk in the North Sea off Great Yarmouth, Norfolk by Luftwaffe aircraft with the loss of 35 of her crew.

== 23 August ==
List of shipwrecks: 23 August 1941
Ship	State	Description
Aldergrove	United Kingdom	World War II: Convoy OG 71: The 1,974 GRT cargo ship on trip from Cardiff for Lisbon with a cargo of patent fuel, was torpedoed and sunk in the Atlantic Ocean (40°43′N 11°39′W) by U-201 (Kriegsmarine) with the loss of one of her 39 crew. Survivors were rescued by HMS Campanula (Royal Navy).
Cisil	Finland	World War II: The cargo ship struck a mine and sank in the Baltic Sea off Kolberg, Germany.
Constanza	Italy	World War II: The coaster was torpedoed and sunk in the Mediterranean Sea south of Lampedusa by British Bristol Blenheim aircraft based on Malta.
Fratelli Garre	Regia Marina	World War II: The requisitioned 413 GRT motor schooner (V 72) travelling in a small convoy from Tripoli for Benghasi, was torpedoed and sunk in the Mediterranean Sea 12 nautical miles (22 km) north-northwest of Sirte by HMS Tetrarch (Royal Navy).
T-204 Fugas	Soviet Navy	World War II: The Fugas-class minesweeper struck a mine and sank in the Baltic Sea west of Kronstadt.
Inger	Norway	World War II: The cargo ship was torpedoed and sunk in the Atlantic Ocean (58°58′N 7°50′W) by U-143 (Kriegsmarine) with the loss of nine of her 23 crew. Survivors were rescued by the fishing trawler Ladylove (United Kingdom) the next day.
Spind	Norway	World War II: Convoy OG 71: The 2,129 GRT cargo ship on a trip from Barry for Lisbon with a cargo of coal, was shelled, set afire and eventually sunk in the Atlantic Ocean (40°43′N 11°39′W) by U-552 (Kriegsmarine). Her 25 crew were rescued by HMS Boreas (Royal Navy).
Stork	United Kingdom	World War II: Convoy OG 71: The 787 GRT coaster on a trip from Preston for Gibraltar with a cargo of cased avgas, was torpedoed and sunk in the Atlantic Ocean (40°43′N 11°39′W) by U-201 (Kriegsmarine) with the loss of nineteen of her 22 crew. Survivors were rescued by HMS Campion (Royal Navy).
HMS Zinnia	Royal Navy	World War II: Convoy OG 71: The Flower-class corvette was torpedoed and sunk south west of Portugal (40°25′N 10°40′W) by U-564 (Kriegsmarine) with the loss of 49 of her 85 crew. Survivors were rescued by HMS Campion (Royal Navy).

== 24 August ==
List of shipwrecks: 24 August 1941
Ship	State	Description
Chiang Hsi	Republic of China Navy	Second Sino-Japanese War: The river gunboat was sunk at Badong, Sichuan, by Japanese aircraft.
Chiang Kum	Republic of China Navy	Second Sino-Japanese War: The river gunboat was sunk at Badong by Japanese aircraft.
Dellie	United Kingdom	The coaster ran aground at Tweed Heads, New South Wales, Australia and was wrecked.
Engels	Soviet Navy	World War II: The destroyer struck a mine and sank in the Baltic Sea north east of Juminda Peninsula, with the loss of 169 of her 180 crew.
Francesco Garre	Regia Marina	World War II: The requisitioned 395 GRT motor schooner (V 113), anchored about 1 nautical mile (1.9 km) north of Sirte (31°14′N 16°36′E), was torpedoed and sunk by HMS Tetrarch (Royal Navy).
HNoMS Kos XVI	Royal Norwegian Navy	The auxiliary minesweeper was rammed from behind by HMS Walney (Royal Navy) in the North Sea off Hull, Yorkshire (53°50′N 0°35′E) a half hour before midnight. She sank just after midnight on 25 August.
Skagerak	United Kingdom	World War II: The cargo ship struck a mine and sank in the River Orwell at Harwich, Essex (51°58′08″N 1°16′06″E) with the loss of eighteen of the 24 people on board. The wreck was subsequently dispersed by explosives.
Statnyi	Soviet Navy	World War II: The Soobrazitelny-class destroyer struck a mine on 18 August in approximate position 58°58′N 23°16′E, and sank off Rohuküla in the storm while under tow.
T-209 Kneknt	Soviet Navy	World War II: The Fugas-class minesweeper was sunk by mines in the Baltic Sea off Juminda Peninsula.
T-214 Bugel	Soviet Navy	World War II: The Fugas-class minesweeperwas sunk by mines in the Baltic Sea off Juminda Peninsula.
T-11	Soviet Navy	World War II: The 8,041 GRT naval tanker, former German vessel Ossag-II, was bombed and sunk by Luftwaffe aircraft off Juminda Peninsula (59°48′N 25°31′E).
Eestirand	Soviet Navy	World War II: Soviet evacuation of Tallinn: The requisitioned 4,688 GRT cargo ship (VT-532) was bombed and damaged in the Baltic Sea by Luftwaffe aircraft off Keri Island and was beached on Prangli Island. Forty-four of her passengers and crew were killed.
Unnamed	German Army	World War II: The captured river ferry was shelled and sunk in the Keila River, possibly by Leningrad (Soviet Navy).

== 25 August ==
List of shipwrecks: 25 August 1941
Ship	State	Description
Babr	Imperial Iranian Navy	World War II: Operation Countenance: The sloop was shelled and sunk at Khorramshar by HMAS Yarra (Royal Australian Navy).
Hohenfels	Germany	World War II: Operation Countenance: The cargo ship (7,862 GRT) was badly damaged during an attempted scuttling to avoid capture at Bandar Shapur, but was beached by the British boarding party to avoid sinking. She was raised in October 1941, towed to Karachi and repaired and reentered service as Empire Kamal.
VT-578 Kosmos	Soviet Navy	World War II: The coaster (249 GRT) was en route from Väinameri (Moonsund) to Paldiski, towing a military cutter. While evading an aircraft attack, the towing rope became entangled in the propeller. She was driven aground by a storm in the Voosi-Kurk Strait near Vormsi Island in Baltic Sea and subsequently sank. The crew reached shore in lifeboats.
M-103	Soviet Navy	World War II: The M-class submarine (206 long tons (210 t)) struck a mine laid by German minelayer Brummer about 8 nautical miles (15 km) north of Vormsi (59°13′N 23°09′E) and sank with a loss of all 21 crew.
T-898 Nenets	Soviet Navy	World War II: The auxiliary minesweeper (553 GRT) was torpedoed and sunk in the Barents Sea 8 nautical miles (15 km) east of Mys-Chyorny (68°20′N 39°00′E) by U-752 (Kriegsmarine) with the loss of 41 of her 43 crew.
Palang	Imperial Iranian Navy	World War II: Operation Countenance: The sloop (950 GRT) was shelled and sunk at Abadan by HMS Shoreham (Royal Navy). Her crew suffered heavily casualties, including two officers killed while the captain was fatally wounded.
Troyburg	Germany	The cargo ship ran aground at Farsund, Norway and was wrecked.
Truvor	Soviet Union	World War II: The 1,151 GRT icebreaker struck a mine and sank northwest of Juminda Peninsula (59°46′N 25°22′E). There were only 22 survivors.
U-452	Kriegsmarine	World War II: The Type VIIC submarine (1,070 GRT) was depth charged first by a Consolidated PBY Catalina aircraft of 209 Squadron, Royal Air Force and then by HMT Vascama (Royal Navy), and sank in the Atlantic Ocean south of Iceland (61°30′N 15°30′W) with the loss of all 42 crew.
Verny	Soviet Navy	World War II: The river gunboat (350 GRT) was bombed and sunk by Junkers Ju 87 near Sukholuchye on the Dnieper River. Of the crew, 9 were killed, 11 missing, and 9 wounded.
Weißenfels	Germany	World War II: Operation Countenance: The cargo ship (7,861 GRT) was scuttled by her crew at Bandar Shapur to avoid capture, sinking in deep water the next morning. She was the only one of the eight Axis ships scuttled that day to be permanently lost.
Zheleznodrozhnik	Soviet Union	World War II: The tanker was sunk in the Baltic Sea by Luftwaffe aircraft.

== 26 August ==
List of shipwrecks: 26 August 1941
Ship	State	Description
Dimitrov	Soviet Navy	The auxiliary river gunboat was sunk on this date.
Kreml	Soviet Navy	The auxiliary river gunboat was sunk on this date.
Lunacharski	Soviet Navy	World War II: The requisitioned 3,618 GRT cargo ship (VT-513) was bombed and sunk in Tallinn Bay by Luftwaffe aircraft, while at anchor awaiting loading. Seven of her crew were killed.
Marija Uljanova	Soviet Navy	World War II: The submarine depot ship was torpedoed and damaged in the Barents Sea (70°08′N 36°03′E) by U-571 (Kriegsmarine). Fourteen survivors were rescued by Valerian Kyubishev (Soviet Navy). Marija Uljanova was beached the next day at Teriberka where she was declared a total loss. She spent the rest of the war as an oil storage hulk and was scrapped post-war.
SK-1 Vodopyanov, SK-3 Parizhskaya Kommuna, SK-5 Bolshevik, and SK-7 Rulevoy	Soviet Navy	The auxiliary river guard ships were lost on this date.
SK-8 Reka	Soviet Navy	World War II: The naval trawler/river guard ship was torpedoed and sunk in the Arctic Ocean off the Kola Peninsula by U-132 (Kriegsmarine).

== 27 August ==
List of shipwrecks: 27 August 1941
Ship	State	Description
Adele	Nazi Germany	World War II: The 199 GRT coastal motorship was damaged in Riga Gulf, about 6 nautical miles (11 km) south of Cape Domesnes by Soviet Navy motor torpedo boats and was subsequently beached. Raised the same day by auxiliary minesweeper M 3135 Vertrouwen (Kriegsmarine) and returned to service.
Dite Körner	Nazi Germany	World War II: The 211 GRT coastal motorship was damaged in Riga Gulf, about 6 nautical miles (11 km) south of Cape Domesnes by Soviet Navy motor torpedo boats and was subsequently beached. Raised the same day by auxiliary minesweeper M 3135 Vertrouwen (Kriegsmarine) and returned to service.
Embassage	United Kingdom	World War II: Convoy OS 4: The cargo ship was torpedoed and sunk in the Atlantic Ocean (approximately 54°N 13°W) by U-557 (Kriegsmarine) with the loss of 39 of her 42 crew. Survivors were rescued by HMCS Assiniboine (Royal Canadian Navy).
Gamma	Soviet Union	World War II: Soviet evacuation of Tallinn: The coaster was scuttled as a blockship at Tallinn, Estonia.
Ladylove	United Kingdom	World War II: The 125-foot (38 m), 230-ton fishing trawler was torpedoed and sunk in the Atlantic Ocean off Iceland by U-202 (Kriegsmarine) with the loss all fourteen hands.
Saugor	United Kingdom	World War II: Convoy OS 4: The cargo ship was torpedoed and sunk in the Atlantic Ocean (53°36′N 16°40′W) by U-557 (Kriegsmarine) with the loss of 59 of her 82 crew. Survivors were rescued by Perth (United Kingdom).
Saule	Soviet Navy	World War II: Soviet evacuation of Tallinn: The requisitioned 1,207 GRT cargo ship (VT-553) was bombed and damaged off Gogland by Junkers Ju 88 aircraft of Kampfgeschwader 77, Luftwaffe. The ship was beached, repaired and refloated on 4 September, and safely reached Kronstadt.
Segundo	Norway	World War II: Convoy OS 4: The cargo ship was torpedoed and sunk in the Atlantic Ocean (53°36′N 16°40′W) by U-557 (Kriegsmarine) with the loss of seven of her 34 crew. Survivors were rescued by HMS Lulworth (Royal Navy)
HMS Skudd III	South African Navy	World War II: The 245 GRT converted whaler was bombed and sunk at Tobruk, Libya by Junkers Ju 87 aircraft of the Luftwaffe with the loss of six of her twelve crew.
Tremoda	United Kingdom	World War II: Convoy OS 4: The cargo ship was torpedoed and sunk in the Atlantic Ocean (53°36′N 16°40′W) by U-557 (Kriegsmarine) with the loss of 32 of her 53 crew. Survivors were rescued by Chevreuil (Free French Naval Forces).

== 28 August ==
List of shipwrecks: 28 August 1941
Ship	State	Description
Alev	Soviet Navy	World War II: Soviet evacuation of Tallinn: The requisitioned 1,445 GRT cargo ship (VT-511) with 1280 people on board, was bombed by Luftwaffe aircraft, broke in two, and sank in the Baltic Sea. There were only 6 survivors.
Amur	Soviet Navy	World War II: Soviet evacuation of Tallinn: The depot ship, a former Amur-class minelayer, was scuttled as a blockship at Tallinn, Estonia.
Artem	Soviet Navy	World War II: Soviet evacuation of Tallinn: The Orfey-class destroyer struck a mine and sank in the Baltic Sea north of Juminda Peninsula, Estonia.
Ata	Soviet Union	World War II: Soviet evacuation of Tallinn: The 199.6 GRT motor schooner with a cargo of ammunition onboard, was shelled and heavily damaged by VMV 17 (Finnish Navy) on 28 August, forcing the crew to abandon her. She sank the next day in a storm.
Ausma	Soviet Navy	World War II: Soviet evacuation of Tallinn: The requisitioned 1,791 GRT cargo ship (VT-546) with only 60 tons of military cargo onboard, was bombed by Luftwaffe aircraft and sank near Gogland.
Cilicia	Italy	World War II: The cargo ship was torpedoed and sunk in the Mediterranean Sea south south west of Capo Gallo, Morea, Greece by HMS Rorqual (Royal Navy).
Ella	Soviet Navy	World War II: Soviet evacuation of Tallinn: The requisitioned 1,521 GRT passenger ship (VT-530) struck a mine and sank in the Baltic Sea off Juminda Peninsula (59°46′N 25°19′E). Her master and 643 passengers and crew were killed, 49 passengers and crew were rescued.
Everita	Soviet Navy	World War II: Soviet evacuation of Tallinn: The requisitioned 3,251 GRT cargo ship (VT-545) struck a mine and sank in the Gulf of Finland off Juminda Peninsula with a loss of approximately 1,500 men.
Jana	Soviet Union	World War II: Soviet evacuation of Tallinn: The cargo ship struck a mine and sank in the Baltic Sea.
I-8 Kronshtadt	Soviet Navy	World War II: Soviet evacuation of Tallinn: The Kronshtadt-class gunboat struck a mine and sank in the Baltic Sea north of Cape Juminda.
Järvamaa	Soviet Navy	World War II: The 1,363 GRT requisitioned cargo ship (VT-547) with about 800 people onboard, was bombed and heavily damaged by Luftwaffe aircraft. The ship continued burning and eventually broke in two and sank on 30 August 10 nautical miles (19 km) east of Gogland. There were approximately 500 survivors.
Kalinin	Soviet Navy	World War II: Soviet evacuation of Tallinn: The Izyaslav-class destroyer struck a mine and sank in the Baltic Sea north of Cape Juminda.
Kolyvan	Soviet Navy	World War II: Soviet evacuation of Tallinn: The 546 GRT rescue ship, struck a mine and sank in the Gulf of Finland.
Krišjānis Valdemārs	Soviet Navy	World War II: Soviet evacuation of Tallinn: The icebreaker was attacked near Mohni Island by Junkers Ju 88 aircraft of Kampfgeschwader 77, Luftwaffe. The ship tried to maneuver to avoid being hit, but left the cleared channel, struck a mine and sank.
TShch-42	Soviet Navy	World War II: Soviet evacuation of Tallinn: The auxiliary minesweeper hit a mine and sank off Juminda Peninsula.
TShch-56 Barometr	Soviet Navy	World War II: Soviet evacuation of Tallinn: The minesweeper struck a mine and sank in the Gulf of Finland.
TShch-71 Krab	Soviet Navy	World War II: Soviet evacuation of Tallinn: The minesweeper was sunk by mines in the Baltic Sea near Suursaari.
No. 1501	Soviet Navy	World War II: Soviet evacuation of Tallinn: The M-1-class minesweeper was scuttled at Tallinn. She was salvaged by the Germans in May 1942 and put in Kriegsmarine service as Ks-156.
Otaio	United Kingdom	World War II: Convoy OS 4: The cargo ship was torpedoed and sunk in the Atlantic Ocean 300 nautical miles (560 km) west by north of the Fastnet Rock (52°16′N 17°50′W) by U-558 (Kriegsmarine) with the loss of thirteen of her 78 crew. Survivors were rescued by HMS Vanoc (Royal Navy).
MO-233	Soviet Navy	Patrol boat, former Finnish patrol boat A-31, was sunk near Tallinn by German field artillery.
S-5	Soviet Navy	World War II: Soviet evacuation of Tallinn: The S-class submarine struck mines and sank in the Baltic Sea between Mohni Island and Juminda Peninsula. There were 9 survivors.
Shch-301	Soviet Navy	World War II: Soviet evacuation of Tallinn: The Shchuka-class submarine struck a mine and sank in the Baltic Sea south of Ruuskeri, Estonia (59°52′N 25°16′E with the loss of 39 of her 41 crew.
Saturn	Soviet Navy	World War II: Soviet evacuation of Tallinn: The Uragan-class guard ship was sunk by mines in the Baltic near Suursaari whilst trying to assist survivors of Vironia.
Serp-I-Molot	Soviet Navy	World War II: The repair ship was bombed and damaged in the Gulf of Finland by Junkers Ju 88 aircraft of Kampfgeschwader 77, Luftwaffe and was beached at Suursaari. She was declared a total loss.)
Skoryi	Soviet Navy	World War II: Soviet evacuation of Tallinn: The Soobrazitelny-class destroyer struck a mine, broke in two and sank off Mohni Island.
Sneg	Soviet Navy	World War II: Soviet evacuation of Tallinn: The Uragan-class guard ship was sunk by mines in the Baltic Sea near Suursaari.
TK-103	Soviet Navy	World War II: Soviet evacuation of Tallinn: The G-5-class motor torpedo boat was shelled and sunk in error at night by Soviet destroyers north of Juminda Peninsula.
TT-1	Soviet Union	World War II: Soviet evacuation of Tallinn: The 325 GRT motor barge was sunk by Luftwaffe aircraft off Juminda Peninsula.
Topaz	Soviet Navy	World War II: Soviet evacuation of Tallinn: The Project 122-class submarine chaser was struck a mine and sank off Juminda Peninsula.
Tsiklon	Soviet Navy	World War II: Soviet evacuation of Tallinn: The Uragan-class guard ship was sunk by mines in the Baltic Sea near Suursaari whilst attempting to help survivors of Everita.
Vironia	Soviet Navy	World War II: Soviet evacuation of Tallinn: The 2,026 GRT requisitioned passenger ship was bombed and damaged in the Gulf of Finland by Junkers Ju 88 aircraft of Kampfgeschwader 77, Luftwaffe. She later struck a mine and sank off Juminda Peninsula.
Volodarski	Soviet Navy	World War II: Soviet evacuation of Tallinn: The Orfey-class destroyer struck a mine and sank in the Baltic Sea north of Cape Juminda.
Vostok	Soviet Navy	World War II: Soviet evacuation of Tallinn: The hydrographic survey ship was sunk in the Gulf of Finland.
Yakov Sverdlov	Soviet Navy	World War II: Soviet evacuation of Tallinn: The Novík-class destroyer struck a mine and sank in the Baltic Sea north of Cape Juminda.

== 29 August ==
List of shipwrecks: 29 August 1941
Ship	State	Description
Atis Kronvalds	Soviet Navy	World War II: Soviet evacuation of Tallinn: The requisitioned 1,423 GRT cargo ship (VT-563) was bombed and sunk southwest of Lavansaari (59°55′N 27°45′E) by Junkers Ju 88 aircraft of Kampfgeschwader 77, Luftwaffe.
Balhash	Soviet Navy	World War II: Soviet evacuation of Tallinn: The requisitioned 2,191 GRT cargo ship (VT-501) struck a mine and sank in the Baltic Sea between Vaindloo and Rodsher with the loss of 8 crew and 87 wounded.
DM-9 Fiammetta	Regia Marina	World War II: The 393 GRT auxiliary minesweeper was bombed and set afire by British aircraft while anchored at Tripoli. Her ammo storage soon caught fire making salvage impossible, and she eventually burned out and sank.
Ergonautis	Soviet Navy	World War II: Soviet evacuation of Tallinn: The requisitioned 206 GRT coaster (VT-537) was bombed and sunk by Luftwaffe aircraft off Juminda Peninsula with a loss of more than 300 men.
Evald	Soviet Navy	World War II: Soviet evacuation of Tallinn: The requisitioned 932 GRT coaster (VT-520) was bombed and sunk by Luftwaffe aircraft off Mohni.
Ivan Papanin	Soviet Navy	World War II: Soviet evacuation of Tallinn: The requisitioned 3,374 GRT cargo ship (VT-505), with 3,000 troops and 200 automobiles on board, was bombed and heavily damaged 19 nautical miles (35 km) west of Gogland by Junkers Ju 88 aircraft of Kampfgeschwader 77, Luftwaffe. More than 2,500 people were able to disembark, after the ship was beached on Gogland. She was bombed again and sank the next day.
Kamenets-Podolsk	Soviet Union	World War II: The cargo ship was sunk in the Black Sea between Kerch and Sevastopol (44°49′N 36°06′E) by Luftwaffe aircraft with the loss of nine of her 53 crew.
Kalpaks	Soviet Navy	World War II: Soviet evacuation of Tallinn: The requisitioned 2,190 GRT cargo ship (VT-524), converted to a hospital ship, was bombed and sunk southwest of Lavansaari by Junkers Ju 88 aircraft of Kampfgeschwader 77, Luftwaffe. Over 1,100 passengers were killed. Her master, fifteen crew and 70 passengers were rescued.
Lake Lucerne	Soviet Navy	World War II: Soviet evacuation of Tallinn: The requisitioned 2,317 GRT cargo ship (VT-581) was bombed and heavily damaged south off Gogland (60°00′7″N 27°00′8″E) by Junkers Ju 88 aircraft of Kampfgeschwader 77, Luftwaffe. The ship was beached and over 2,500 were able to reach land. Two hundred passengers and crew were killed. The ship was repeatedly bombed and eventually sank.
Luga	Soviet Navy	World War II: Soviet evacuation of Tallinn: The requisitioned 2,329 GRT cargo ship (VT-518) struck a mine and was damaged off Juminda Peninsula (59°47′N 25°25′E). After transferring 1,206 passengers to Skundra, the captain ordered to open kingstons to scuttle the ship. The vessel was eventually sunk by German coastal artillery.
MO-109	Soviet Navy	World War II: Soviet evacuation of Tallinn: The MO-4-class patrol boat struck a mine and sank off Cape Juminda.
Naissaar	Soviet Navy	World War II: Soviet evacuation of Tallinn: The requisitioned 1,892 GRT cargo ship (VT-584) struck a mine and was subsequently sunk by Luftwaffe aircraft east of Mohni.
Serp i Molot	Soviet Navy	World War II: Soviet evacuation of Tallinn: The depot ship was bombed and severely damaged in the Gulf of Finland by Junkers Ju 88 aircraft of Kampfgeschwader 77, Luftwaffe. She was consequently beached.
Sigulda	Soviet Navy	World War II: Soviet evacuation of Tallinn: The requisitioned 1,999 GRT cargo ship (VT-519) on her trip to Tallinn in ballast, was bombed and damaged south of Gogland (60°01′N 26°59′E) by Luftwaffe aircraft. The ship was beached, and sunk the next day with a loss of 1 man.
Siauliai	Soviet Navy	World War II: Soviet evacuation of Tallinn: The requisitioned 939 GRT cargo ship (VT-550) was bombed and damaged near Rodsher by Luftwaffe aircraft. The ship was able to reach Gogland and disembark her passengers. She was further damaged by enemy aircraft and sank in shallow water. Attempts to refloat her on 5-7 September 1941 proved unsuccessful. The ship served as bunker ship for smaller vessels evacuating from Hanko Peninsula in November-December 1941. The wreck was finally torpedoed and destroyed by M-97 on 13 June 1942.
Skrunda	Soviet Navy	World War II: Soviet evacuation of Tallinn: The requisitioned 2,414 GRT cargo ship (VT-529) was bombed and heavily damaged about 5 nautical miles (9.3 km) northwest of Vaindloo by Junkers Ju 88 aircraft of Kampfgeschwader 77, Luftwaffe. After approximately 2,000 people were disembarked, the crew scuttled the ship on 30 August (59°59′N 26°36′E).
Sursum Corda IV	Netherlands	The fishing trawler was last seen in North Sea on this day and then vanished for an unknown reason with the loss of all twelve hands.
T-12	Soviet Union	World War II: Soviet evacuation of Tallinn: The 1,240 GRT tanker, former Swedish vessel Soya VII, was bombed and sunk by Luftwaffe aircraft in the Baltic Sea, 5 nautical miles (9.3 km) east of Gogland.
Tobol	Soviet Navy	World War II: Soviet evacuation of Tallinn: The requisitioned 2,758 GRT cargo ship (VT-512) was bombed and sunk northwest of Vaindloo (59°55′N 26°11′E) by 5 Junkers Ju 88 aircraft, Luftwaffe .
U-570	Royal Navy	World War II: The captured Type VIIC submarine was beached at Þorlákshöfn, Iceland to prevent her sinking. Subsequently refloated on 5 September, repaired and entered British service as HMS Graph.
Vaindlo	Soviet Navy	World War II: The requisitioned 604 GRT passenger-cargo ship was bombed and sunk off Gogland (60°00′N 27°16′E) by Luftwaffe aircraft.
Vtoraya Pyatiletka	Soviet Navy	World War II: Soviet evacuation of Tallinn: The requisitioned 3,974 GRT cargo ship (VT-543) was bombed and heavily damaged west of Gogland Island (60°04′N 26°44′E) by Junkers Ju 88 aircraft of Kampfgeschwader 77, Luftwaffe. 2,500 people were disembarked and landed on Gogland. The ship sank on 30 August after another air attack.

== 30 August ==
List of shipwrecks: 30 August 1941
Ship	State	Description
V51 Alfa	Regia Marina	World War II: The auxiliary patrol vessel (373 GRT) was torpedoed and sunk in the Mediterranean Sea twenty-two miles south of Capo dell'Armi, Calabria (37°34′N 15°42′E) by HMS Unbeaten (Royal Navy). Of a crew of 15, three were missing, the twelve survivors (including five wounded) were rescued by the hospital ship Epomeo (Regia Marina).
Bahia Laura, and Donau	Nazi Germany	World War II: The cargo ships were torpedoed and sunk in the Norwegian Sea off the Lofoten Islands, Nordland, Norway (70°27′N 21°55′E) by HMS Trident (Royal Navy). Survivors were rescued by Hans Lody, Karl Galster, R-153, V 6111 Franke, V 6113 Gote (all Kriegsmarine) and Midnatsol (Norway). Of 1,667 men aboard, 1,222 were rescued.
DM 27	Regia Marina	The 367 GRT auxiliary minesweeper, former motor sailing boat Giuseppina V., was bombed, set on fire and sunk in Tripoli by Vickers Wellington bombers of No. 38 Squadron RAF during a night raid.
Egadi	Italy	World War II: The cargo ship was torpedoed and sunk in the Mediterranean Sea 30 nautical miles (56 km) north east of Lampedusa by Fairey Swordfish aircraft of 830 Squadron, Fleet Air Arm.
MO-202	Soviet Navy	World War II: The MO-4-class patrol boat was shelled and sunk in Neva River, near Ivanovsky Rapids by German shore-based artillery.
MO-173	Soviet Navy	The MO-2-class patrol vessel was shelled, set afire and sunk by German artillery in Neva River while on passage from Leningrad for Lake Ladoga.
MO-174	Soviet Navy	The MO-2-class patrol vessel was shelled, set afire and sunk by German artillery in Neva River while on passage from Leningrad for Lake Ladoga.
Riv	Italy	World War II: The cargo ship was bombed and sunk at Tripoli, Libya by Vickers Wellington aircraft of the Royal Air Force.

== 31 August ==
List of shipwrecks: 29 August 1941
Ship	State	Description
Anglo Norse	United Kingdom	The cargo ship caught fire whilst under repair in the River Tyne and sank when her cargo of ammunition exploded. She was refloated on 3 September, repaired and re-entered service as Empire Norse.
Bobruysk	Soviet Navy	World War II: The Zhitomar-class river monitor was damaged by German field artillery and scuttled in the Dnepr River at Okuninovo to avoid capture by the Germans.
SK-4 Tekhrik	Soviet Navy	The auxiliary river guard ship (200 t, 1931) was lost on this date.
Trudovoy	Soviet Navy	World War II: The Trudovoy-class gunboat ran aground in the Dnepr River while under tow and was abandoned. She was estroyed by German tanks.

== Unknown date ==
List of shipwrecks: Unknown date 1941
Ship	State	Description
HMS LCA 31, HMS LCA 38, HMS LCA 39, HMS LCA 45, HMS LCA 48, HMS LCA 50, HMS LCA 51, HMS LCA 60, HMS LCA 63, HMS LCA 64,HMS LCA 75, HMS LCA 79, HMS LCA 80, HMS LCA 81, HMS LCA 87, and HMS LCA 113	Royal Navy	The landing craft assault were lost some time in August.
HMS LCM 32, HMS LCM 55, HMS LCM 67, HMS LCM 95, HMS LCM 103, HMS LCM 107, and HMS LCM 108	Royal Navy	The landing craft mechanized were lost sometime in August.
M-49	Soviet Navy	World War II: The M-class submarine was lost off Vladivostok, probably to a Russian mine, sometime between 10 and 16 August.
M-63	Soviet Navy	World War II: The M-class submarine was lost off Vladivostok, probably to a Russian mine, sometime between 10–16 August.
