= Rova =

Rova may refer to:

- Rova, Domžale, a village in the municipality of Domžale in Slovenia
- Rova (Madagascar), a type of fortified royal complex found throughout the highlands of Madagascar
- Rova of Antananarivo, a royal-palace complex in Antananarivo that served as the seat of government in pre-colonial Madagascar
- ROVA, the Rest of Virginia, a term referring to the portion of Virginia not including Northern Virginia
- Rova Saxophone Quartet
- The Rova (Hebrew: הרובע היהודי, HaRova HaYehudi), the Jewish Quarter in Jerusalem
- Rova (app), a digital audio streaming app associated with MediaWorks Radio in New Zealand
- Rova (river), Kola Peninsula, Murmansk Oblast, Russia

== People with the surname ==
- Adele Rova (born 1996), Fijian swimmer
- Cheyenne Rova (born 1995), Fijian swimmer
- Maria Rova (born 1964), American-German artist living in Fiji
