= SS Aguila =

Aguila, Spanish for eagle, is a common name for ships. Steamships that have been called Aguila include:

- SS Aguila (1909), sunk by a German U-boat in 1915
- SS Aguila (1916), sunk by a German U-boat in 1941
