= Chilean ship Águila =

Águila is the name of the following ships of the Chilean Navy:

- Chilean brigantine Águila (1796)
- Chilean brigantine Águila (1819)
- Chilean cutter Águila, launched 1909
- Chilean corvette Águila, never completed
- Chilean landing ship Águila, launched 1945
- Chilean transporter Águila, launched 1957

== See also ==
- Águila (disambiguation)
- SS Aguila
