= Convoy OG 71 =

Convoy during naval battles of the Second World War

Convoy OG.71
- Part of World War II
Date	13–25 August 1941
Location	North Atlantic
Result	German victory

Belligerents
Germany	United Kingdom Royal Norwegian Navy

Commanders and leaders
Admiral Karl Dönitz	Vice-Admiral P E Parker DSO

Strength
8 U-boats	23 merchant ships 13 escorts

Casualties and losses
	10 ships sunk (8 merchants, 2 escorts); 360 killed

Convoy OG 71 was a trade convoy of merchant ships during the Second World War. It was the 71st of the numbered OG convoys Outbound from the British Isles to Gibraltar. The convoy departed Liverpool on 13 August 1941 and was found on 17 August by a Focke-Wulf Fw 200 Condor of Kampfgeschwader 40. Starting on August 19, it became the first convoy of the war to be attacked by a German submarine wolfpack, when reached by eight U-boats from 1st U-boat Flotilla, operating out of Brest. Ten ships comprising a total tonnage of 15,185 tons were sunk before the U-boats lost contact on 23 August.

== Legacy ==
This convoy was known as "Nightmare Convoy". Eight merchant ships, two naval escorts and over 400 people died, including 152 from the commodore's ship, Aguila (146 on August 19 and 6 survivors lost on August 22 when Empire Oak sank). The Aguila losses included the 22 "lost Wrens" (members of the Women's Royal Naval Service, or WRNS) who had volunteered for duties at Gibraltar. After this, Wrens were never sent again on passenger liners in convoys, but transported on HM ships. In their honour, a new Black Swan-class sloop, launched in 1942, was named HMS Wren, while a Liverpool-class lifeboat, launched in 1951, was named Aguila Wren.

Of the convoy's surviving merchant ships, five reached Gibraltar while 10 retreated to neutral Portugal. This was described as the most "bitter act of surrender could ever come our way".

The two ships from neutral Ireland were carrying British coal—after this incident, the Irish ship owners decided not to sail their vessels in British convoys and by the early months of 1942 the practice had ceased.

== Ships in the convoy ==
=== Allied merchant ships ===
A total of 23 merchant vessels joined the convoy in Liverpool.

Name	Flag	Tonnage (GRT)	Notes
Aguila (1916)	UK	3,255	Passenger ship sunk by U-201 on 19 Aug, with 146 dead (another 6 survivors died when Empire Oak was lost 3 days later); Convoy Commodore's ship (Vice-Admiral P E Parker DSO)
Aighai (1896)	Greece	1,406	Retreated to Porto
Aldergrove (1918)	UK	1,974	Sunk by U-201 on 23 Aug, with 1 dead
Alva (1934)	UK	1,584	Sunk by U-559 on 19 Aug
Cervantes (1919)	UK	1,810	Retreated to Lisbon.
Ciscar (1919)	UK	1,808	Sunk by U-201 on 19 Aug
Clonlara (1926)	Ireland	1,203	Retreated towards Lisbon. Sunk by U-201 on 22 Aug, with 19 dead
Copeland (1923)	UK	1,526	Rescue Ship
Ebro (1920)	Denmark	1,547	Reached Gibraltar.
Empire Oak (1941)	UK	484	Sunk by U-564 on 22 Aug, with 19 dead (including 6 of 6 originally rescued from Aguila and 9 of 11 rescued from Alva)
Empire Stream (1941)	UK	2,911	Retreated to Lisbon. Vice-Commodore's Ship
Grelhead (1915)	UK	4,274	Retreated to Lisbon
Lanarhone (1928)	Ireland	1,221	Arrived in Lisbon, her intended destination.
Lapwing (1920)	UK	1,348	Reached Gibraltar.
Lyminge (1919)	UK	2,499	Retreated to Lisbon.
Marklyn (1918)	UK	3,090	Reached Gibraltar.
Meta (1930)	UK	1,575	Retreated to Lisbon.
Petrel (1920)	UK	1,354	Retreated to Porto
Spero (1922)	UK	1,589	Reached Gibraltar.
Spind (1917)	Norway	2,197	Torpedoed and damaged by U-564 & finally sunk by U-552 on 23 Aug, with no deaths
Starling (1930)	UK	1,320	Reached Gibraltar.
Stork (1937)	UK	787	Sunk by U-201 on 23 Aug, with 19 dead
Switzerland (1922)	UK	1,291	Retreated to Lisbon.

=== Convoy escorts ===
A series of armed military ships escorted the convoy at various times during its journey.

Name	Flag	Type	Joined	Left
HNoMS Bath (I17)	Royal Norwegian Navy	Wickes-class destroyer	13 Aug 1941	Sunk by U-204 on 19 Aug 1941, 88 Dead
HMS Bluebell (K80)	Royal Navy	Flower-class corvette	15 Aug 1941	23 Aug 1941
HMS Boreas (H77)	Royal Navy	B-class destroyer	22 Aug 1941	23 Aug 1941
HMS Campanula (K18)	Royal Navy	Flower-class corvette	15 Aug 1941	23 Aug 1941
HMS Campion (K108)	Royal Navy	Flower-class corvette	15 Aug 1941	23 Aug 1941
HMS Gurkha (G63)	Royal Navy	L-class destroyer	20 Aug 1941	23 Aug 1941
HMS Hydrangea (K39)	Royal Navy	Flower-class corvette	15 Aug 1941	23 Aug 1941
HMS Lance (G87)	Royal Navy	L-class destroyer	20 Aug 1941	23 Aug 1941
HMS Leith (U36)	Royal Navy	Grimsby-class sloop	13 Aug 1941	23 Aug 1941
HMS Vidette (D48)	Royal Navy	Admiralty V-class destroyer	21 Aug 1941	23 Aug 1941
HMS Wallflower (K44)	Royal Navy	Flower-class corvette	15 Aug 1941	23 Aug 1941
HMS Wivern (D66)	Royal Navy	Modified W-class destroyer	22 Aug 1941	23 Aug 1941
HMS Zinnia (K98)	Royal Navy	Flower-class corvette	13 Aug 1941	Sunk by U-564 on 23 Aug 1941, 68 Dead

== See also ==
- List of shipwrecks in August 1941

== Bibliography ==
- Edwards, Bernard (2009). The Cruel Sea Retold. South Yorkshire: Pen & Sword Military. ISBN 978-1-84415-863-8.
- Hague, Arnold (2000). The Allied Convoy System 1939–1945. ISBN 1-86176-147-3.
- Rohwer, J; Hummelchen, G (1992). Chronology of the War at Sea 1939–1945. Annapolis, MD: Naval Institute Press. ISBN 1-55750-105-X.
