= Sukhaya (Iokanga) =

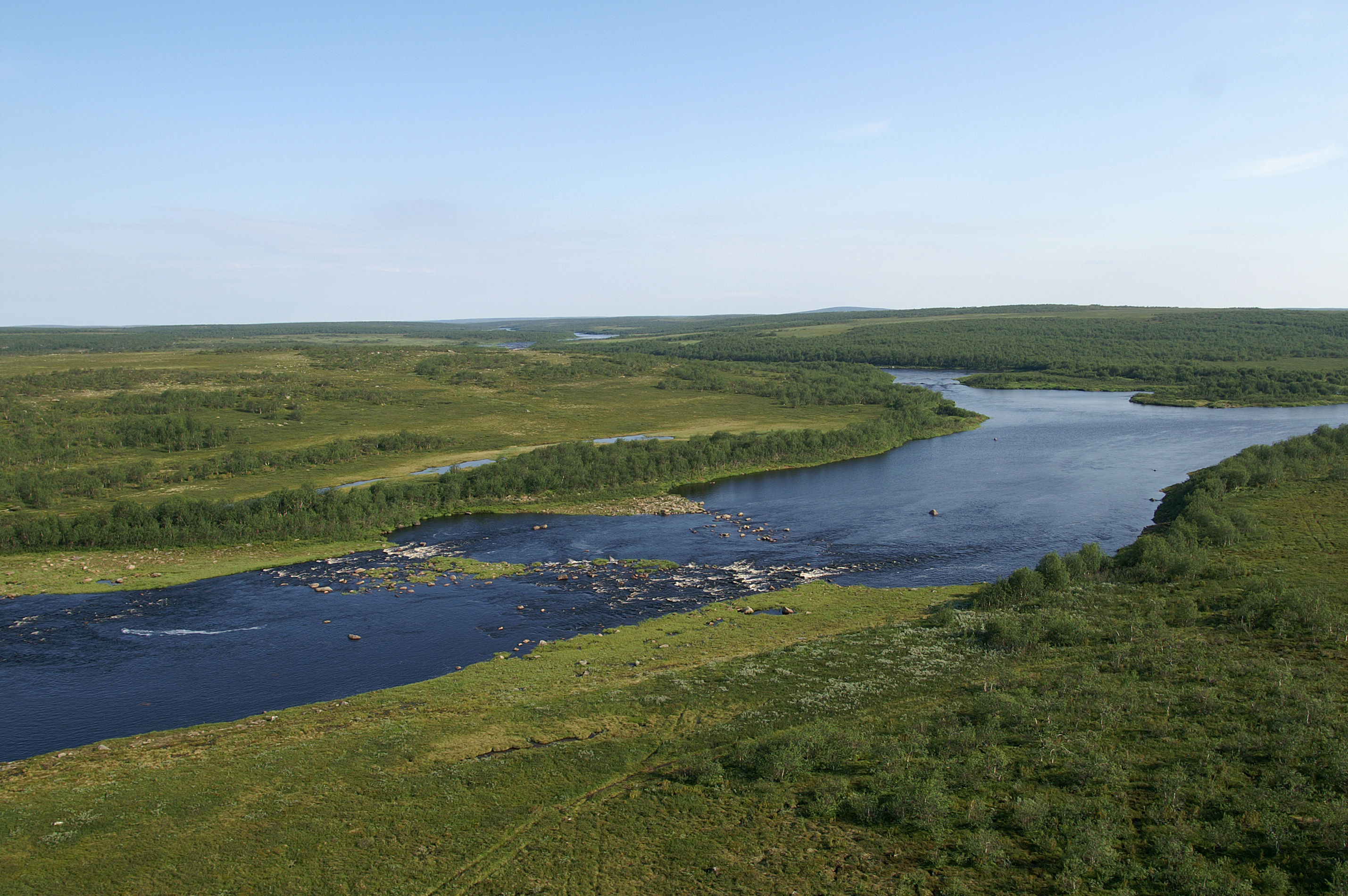
- Native name: Сухая (Russian)

Location
- Country: Russia
- Region: Murmansk Oblast

Physical characteristics
- Source
  - elevation: 368 m (1,207 ft)
- Mouth: Iokanga
  - coordinates: 67.7253°N 38.6593°E
  - elevation: 174 m (571 ft)
- Length: 97 km (60 mi)
- Basin size: 1,340 km^{2} (520 sq mi)

Basin features
- Progression: Iokanga→ Barents Sea

The Sukhaya (Russian: Сухая) is a river in the north of the Kola Peninsula in Murmansk Oblast, Russia. It is 97 kilometres (60 mi) long, and has a drainage basin of 1,340 square kilometres (520 sq mi). The Sukhaya originates on the Keivy and flows into the Iokanga. Its biggest tributary is the Zolotaya.
