= German submarine U-372 =

German World War II submarine

History

Nazi Germany
- Name: U-372
- Ordered: 23 September 1939
- Builder: Kriegsmarinewerft Kiel, Kiel
- Yard number: 3
- Laid down: 17 November 1939
- Launched: 8 March 1941
- Commissioned: 19 April 1941
- Fate: Sunk on 4 August 1942

General characteristics
- Class & type: Type VIIC submarine
- Displacement: 769 tonnes (757 long tons) surfaced; 871 t (857 long tons) submerged
- Length: 67.10 m (220 ft 2 in) o/a; 50.50 m (165 ft 8 in) pressure hull
- Beam: 6.20 m (20 ft 4 in) o/a; 4.70 m (15 ft 5 in) pressure hull
- Draught: 4.74 m (15 ft 7 in)
- Installed power: 2,800–3,200 PS (2,100–2,400 kW; 2,800–3,200 bhp) (diesels); 750 PS (550 kW; 740 shp) (electric)
- Propulsion: 2 shafts; 2 × diesel engines; 2 × electric motors
- Speed: 17.7 knots (32.8 km/h; 20.4 mph) surfaced; 7.6 knots (14.1 km/h; 8.7 mph) submerged
- Range: 8,500 nmi (15,700 km; 9,800 mi) at 10 knots (19 km/h; 12 mph) surfaced; 80 nmi (150 km; 92 mi) at 4 knots (7.4 km/h; 4.6 mph) submerged
- Test depth: 230 m (750 ft); Crush depth: 250–295 m (820–968 ft)
- Complement: 4 officers, 40–56 enlisted
- Armament: 5 × 53.3 cm (21 in) torpedo tubes (4 bow, 1 stern); 14 × torpedoes or 26 TMA mines; 1 × 8.8 cm (3.46 in) deck gun (220 rounds); 1 x 2 cm (0.79 in) C/30 AA gun

Service record
- Part of: 1st U-boat Flotilla; 19 April – 13 December 1941; 29th U-boat Flotilla; 14 December 1941 – 4 August 1942
- Identification codes: M 41 556
- Commanders: Kptlt. Heinz-Joachim Neumann; 19 April 1941 – 4 August 1942
- Operations: 6 patrols: 1st patrol: 9 July – 13 August 1941; 2nd patrol: 10 September – 13 October 1941; 3rd patrol: 13 November – 16 December 1941; 4th patrol: 17 – 31 January 1942; 5th patrol: 15 June – 12 July 1942; 6th patrol: 27 July – 4 August 1942
- Victories: 3 merchant ships sunk (11,751 GRT); 1 auxiliary warship sunk (14,650 GRT)

German submarine U-372 was a Type VIIC U-boat built for Nazi Germany's Kriegsmarine for service during World War II. She was laid down on 17 November 1939 by Kriegsmarinewerft Kiel as construction number 3, launched on 8 March 1941 and commissioned on 19 April 1941 under Kapitänleutnant Heinz-Joachim Neumann.

== Design ==
German Type VIIC submarines were preceded by the shorter Type VIIB submarines. U-372 had a displacement of 769 tonnes (757 long tons) when at the surface and 871 tonnes (857 long tons) while submerged. She had a total length of 67.10 m (220 ft 2 in), a pressure hull length of 50.50 m (165 ft 8 in), a beam of 6.20 m (20 ft 4 in), a height of 9.60 m (31 ft 6 in), and a draught of 4.74 m (15 ft 7 in). The submarine was powered by two Germaniawerft F46 four-stroke, six-cylinder supercharged diesel engines producing a total of 2,800 to 3,200 metric horsepower (2,060 to 2,350 kW; 2,760 to 3,160 shp) for use while surfaced, two AEG GU 460/8–27 double-acting electric motors producing a total of 750 metric horsepower (550 kW; 740 shp) for use while submerged. She had two shafts and two 1.23 m (4 ft) propellers. The boat was capable of operating at depths of up to 230 metres (750 ft).

The submarine had a maximum surface speed of 17.7 knots (32.8 km/h; 20.4 mph) and a maximum submerged speed of 7.6 knots (14.1 km/h; 8.7 mph). When submerged, the boat could operate for 80 nautical miles (150 km; 92 mi) at 4 knots (7.4 km/h; 4.6 mph); when surfaced, she could travel 8,500 nautical miles (15,700 km; 9,800 mi) at 10 knots (19 km/h; 12 mph). U-372 was fitted with five 53.3 cm (21 in) torpedo tubes (four fitted at the bow and one at the stern), fourteen torpedoes, one 8.8 cm (3.46 in) SK C/35 naval gun, 220 rounds, and a 2 cm (0.79 in) C/30 anti-aircraft gun. The boat had a complement of between forty-four and sixty.

== Service history ==
The boat's career began with training at 1st U-boat Flotilla on 19 April 1941, followed by active service on 1 July 1941 as part of the 1st Flotilla until 13 December 1941, when she joined 29th U-boat Flotilla for operations in the Mediterranean.

In 6 patrols she sank 3 merchant ships, for a total of 11,751 gross register tons (GRT), and HMS Medway, a 14,650 GRT, Royal Navy submarine depot ship.

=== Fate ===
U-372 was sunk on 4 August 1942 in the Mediterranean Sea, southwest of Haifa, in position 32°28′N 34°37′E, by depth charges from the Royal Navy destroyers HMS Sikh, HMS Zulu, HMS Croome, HMS Tetcott and a Royal Air Force Wellington bomber aircraft. The entire crew survived.

=== Wolfpacks ===
U-372 took part in three wolfpacks, namely:

- Brandenburg (15 September – 1 October 1941)
- Störtebecker (16 – 19 November 1941)
- Steuben (19 November – 2 December 1941)

== Summary of raiding history ==
Date	Ship Name	Nationality	Tonnage (Note: Merchant ship tonnages are in gross register tons. Military vessels are listed by tons displacement.)	Fate
5 August 1941	Belgravian	United Kingdom	3,136	Sunk
5 August 1941	Swiftpool	United Kingdom	5,205	Sunk
19 September 1941	Baron Pentland	United Kingdom	3,410	Sunk
30 June 1942	HMS Medway	Royal Navy	14,650	Sunk

== See also ==
- Mediterranean U-boat Campaign (World War II)

== Bibliography ==
- Busch, Rainer; Röll, Hans-Joachim (1999). German U-boat commanders of World War II : a biographical dictionary. Translated by Brooks, Geoffrey. London, Annapolis, Md: Greenhill Books, Naval Institute Press. ISBN 1-55750-186-6.
- Busch, Rainer; Röll, Hans-Joachim (1999). Deutsche U-Boot-Verluste von September 1939 bis Mai 1945 [German U-boat losses from September 1939 to May 1945]. Der U-Boot-Krieg (in German). Vol. IV. Hamburg, Berlin, Bonn: Mittler. ISBN 3-8132-0514-2.
- Gröner, Erich; Jung, Dieter; Maass, Martin (1991). U-boats and Mine Warfare Vessels. German Warships 1815–1945. Vol. 2. Translated by Thomas, Keith; Magowan, Rachel. London: Conway Maritime Press. ISBN 0-85177-593-4.
- Sharpe, Peter (1998). U-Boat Fact File. Great Britain: Midland Publishing. ISBN 1-85780-072-9.
