= Agila =

Agila may refer to:

- Agila I (died 554), Visigothic king
- Achila II (died 714), Visigothic king, also spelled Agila II
- Agila-1, satellite launched in 1987, the first Philippine satellite through acquisition while in orbit
- ABS-3, satellite launched in 1997, the first Philippine Satellite launched into space, initially named Agila-2
- Agila (satellite), launched in 2024, built by Astranis Space Technologies
- Agila (TV series), a 1987 Philippine teledrama series
- Agila (album), a 1996 album by Spanish rock band Extremoduro
- Agila MSA F.C., Philippine professional football club
- Agila Town, Benue State, Nigeria
- Opel Agila or Vauxhall Agila, a city car

== See also ==
- Aguila (disambiguation)
- Senior Agila, president of the Socorro Bayanihan Services group
- Agila Subic Shipyard, a shipyard in the Philippines
- Agila: The EKsperience, an attraction at Enchanted Kingdom in the Philippines
- 10th Infantry Division (Philippines), also called the Agila Division
- Commonwealth Monitoring Force in Rhodesia, also known as Operation Agila
