= Soela Strait =

Strait in Estonia

Coordinates: 58°40′00″N 22°32′00″E

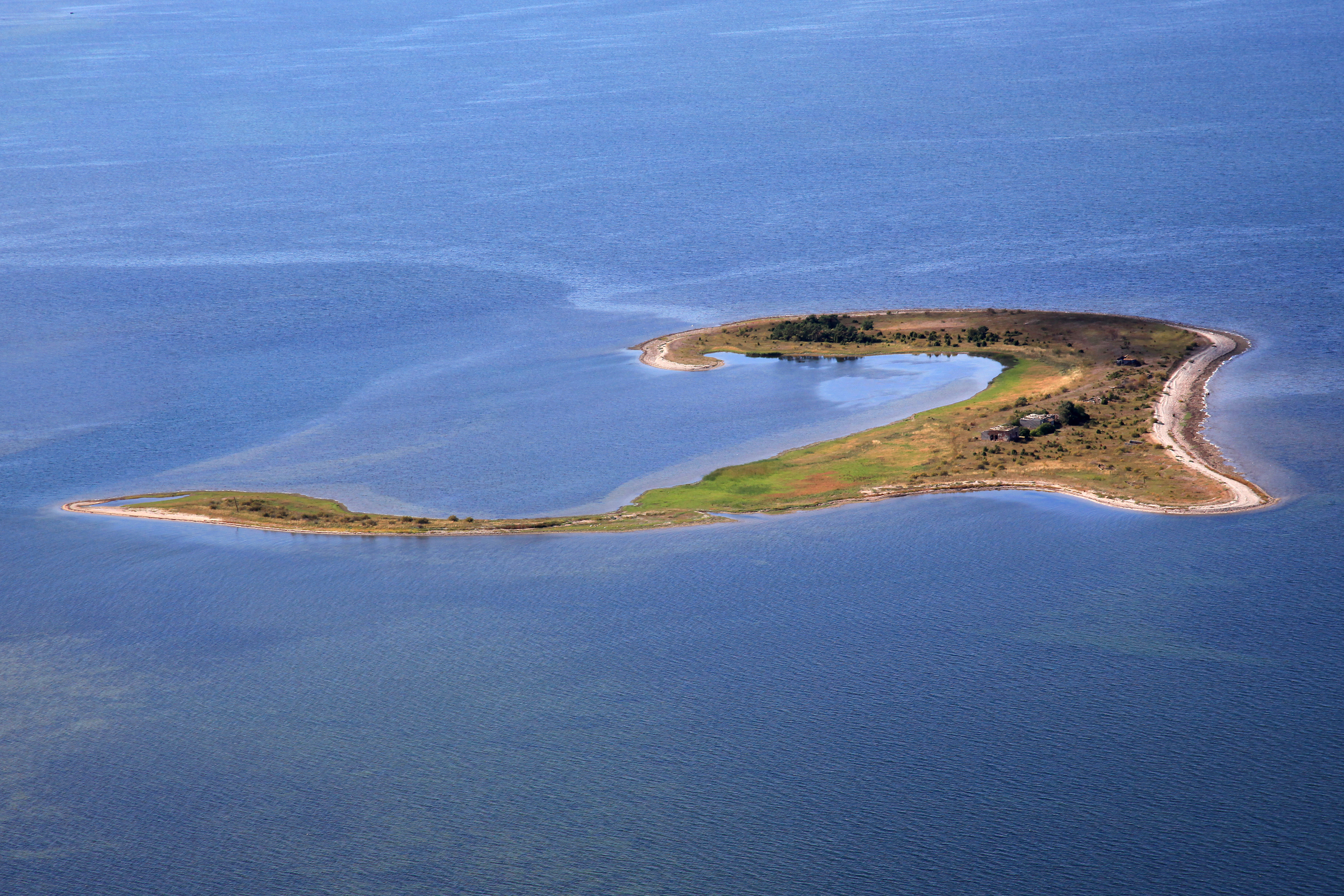
The Soela Strait and Pihlalaid

The Soela Strait (Estonian: Soela väin, Swedish: Sele sund) is a strait in Estonia, located between Saaremaa and Hiiumaa.

== Geography ==
The strait connects the Sea of Straits and an open part of the Baltic Sea. The width of the strait is about 6 kilometers (3.7 mi). The islet of Pihlalaid is located in the strait, as well as the smaller islands of Saaparahu, Suurkuiv, and Väikekuiv.

== Name ==
The Soela Strait was attested in historical records as Solavenn in 1254 and Sele Sund in 1798. The origin of the name Soela is unclear. The ethnographer Carl Friedrich Wilhelm Russwurm derived the name of the strait from the Estonian Swedish word söäl 'seal'. The name has also been seen as based on the Low German word sel 'seal', but this may reflect a later clerical folk etymology. There have also been attempts to connect the name with the word sool 'salt', and folklore connects the name of the strait with the word sõel 'sieve'.
