= SS Aguila (1916) =

Coordinates: 49°14′N 17°34′W

History

United Kingdom
- Name: Aguila
- Namesake: Spanish for eagle
- Owner: Yeoward Line
- Operator: Yeoward Brothers
- Port of registry: Liverpool
- Route: Liverpool – Lisbon – Las Palmas – Tenerife – Liverpool
- Builder: Caledon Shipbuilding & Engineering Co, Dundee
- Yard number: 242
- Launched: 12 September 1916
- Completed: November 1917
- Identification: UK official number 140543; Call sign GPVD (1934–41)
- Fate: Sunk by torpedo, 19 August 1941

General characteristics
- Tonnage: 3,255 GRT; tonnage under deck 2,162; 1,855 NRT
- Length: 315.3 ft (96.1 m)
- Beam: 44.2 ft (13.5 m)
- Draught: 20 ft 9 in (6.32 m)
- Depth: 18.5 ft (5.6 m)
- Decks: two
- Installed power: 395 NHP
- Propulsion: 3-cylinder triple-expansion engine; single screw
- Speed: 12.5 knots (23.2 km/h)
- Sensors & processing systems: wireless direction finding (by 1930); echo sounding device (from 1934)
- Armament: DEMS
- Notes: sister ships: Alondra, Avoceta

SS Aguila was a British steam passenger liner. She was built in Dundee in 1917 and was sunk by enemy action in the North Atlantic in 1941. She belonged to Yeoward Line, which carried passengers and fruit between Liverpool, Lisbon, Madeira and the Canary Islands.

Aguila is Spanish for eagle, and a popular name for ships. This was the second in Yeoward Brothers' fleet, the first Aguila having been built in 1909 and sunk by U-28 in 1915.

== Building and equipment ==
The Caledon Shipbuilding & Engineering Company of Dundee built Aguila, completing her in November 1917. She had nine corrugated furnaces with a combined grate area of 189 square feet (18 m^{2}) that heated three single-ended boilers with a combined heating surface of 7,054 square feet (655 m^{2}). These fed steam at 180 lb_{f}/in^{2} to a three-cylinder triple expansion steam engine that was rated at 395 NHP and drove a single screw, giving her a speed of 12.5 knots (23.2 km/h; 14.4 mph).

Aguila bore similarities to Ardeola that Caledon had built for the Yeoward Line in 1912. The two ships had the same beam, Aguila was just 5.1-foot (1.6 m) longer and her engine was rated as producing 50 more NHP. In the early 1920s Aguila was joined by a pair of slightly longer sister ships, Alondra and Avoceta, completed by Caledon in April 1922 and January 1923.

By 1930 Aguila had wireless direction finding equipment, and from 1934 she had an echo sounding device. Up to 1933 Lloyd's Register records no code letters for Aguila, but when the new wireless telegraph call signs were introduced for 1934, she was designated GPVD.

== Second World War service ==
From October 1939 until 1940 Aguila continued her peacetime run between Liverpool and the Canary Islands. Her only convoy protection was on outward voyages from Liverpool to the North Atlantic west of Portugal, where she would leave the convoy to enter neutral Portuguese waters and proceed to Lisbon unescorted. After calling at Lisbon she would continue unescorted to Las Palmas and Tenerife, and return unescorted to Liverpool.

France's surrender to Germany in June 1940 gave the Kriegsmarine naval bases on France's Atlantic coast, leading to German and Italian submarines' First Happy Time in the Battle of the Atlantic. Allied shipping losses increased and from August 1940 Yeoward Brothers changed the movements of its ships. In August 1940 Aguila had a normal outward run with Convoy OG 40, leaving Liverpool on 3 August and reaching Lisbon on 14 August. Three days later she left Lisbon for Las Palmas, but on 19 August the Italian submarine Barbarigo shelled her with its 100 mm (4 in) guns. The Regia Marina vessel claimed five hits on Aguila, but in fact the liner was undamaged and reached Las Palmas on 20 August.

After her narrow escape Aguila did not call at Tenerife, but instead went south to Freetown in Sierra Leone. There the UK formed inbound convoys to the British Isles, but if Aguila hoped to join one she was unsuccessful. From Freetown she turned north and steamed unescorted to Madeira, where she stopped for five days before continuing to Gibraltar. There she joined Convoy HG 43, which left on 4 September and reached Liverpool on 19 September.

On 11 October 1940 Aguila left Liverpool with Convoy OG 44, but stayed with the convoy all the way to Gibraltar. She then sailed unescorted to Lisbon and back to Gibraltar (24 October – 3 November), and made a separate unescorted trip to Las Palmas, Tenerife and Cádiz and again back to Gibraltar (3–19 November). Then she joined Convoy HG 47, which left Gibraltar on 20 November and reached Liverpool on 4 December.

Aguila survived Liverpool's Christmas Blitz of 20–22 December. From 29 December to 23 July she made three round trips: by convoy from Britain to Gibraltar, unescorted from there to Lisbon and back, and then by convoy from Gibraltar home to Britain. From the first and third trips Aguila returned to her home port of Liverpool, but during her second trip Liverpool suffered the May Blitz, and on 3 May part of the port was devastated when the munitions ship Malakand burned and exploded in Huskisson Dock. Therefore, when Aguila returned a fortnight later in Convoy HG 61 it was diverted to the Firth of Clyde. The arrangement was only temporary. On 23 July Aguila was back in her home port, arriving in Liverpool with Convoy HG 67.

== Final voyage and loss ==
Approximate position of Aguila's wreck

Aguila loaded general cargo in Liverpool and embarked at least 86 Royal Navy personnel bound for Gibraltar and six civilian passengers. The RN personnel included nine Fleet Air Arm, seven Royal Naval Patrol Service, three RNR, 11 RNVR, 22 Women's Royal Naval Service (Wrens) and 35 others. The 22 Wrens were all volunteers for duties at Gibraltar: 12 as cypher officers and 10 as wireless operators. Also with them was a QARNNS nurse, Sister Kate Gribble.

Aguila was one of 23 merchant ships that formed Convoy OG 71, which left Liverpool on 13 August. Allied convoys included ships of other nationalities as well as British. OG 71 included two from Ireland one each from Denmark, Greece and Norway. The Republic of Ireland was neutral so its ships, Clonlara and Lanarhone, were not blacked out. Aguila's Master, Arthur Firth, objected that their lights compromised HG 71's protection at night.

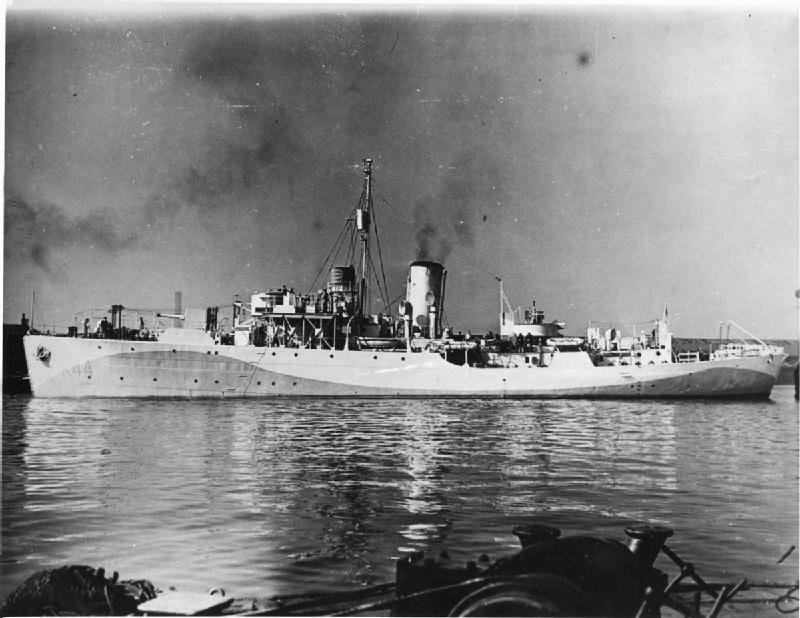
Flower-class corvette HMS Wallflower rescued 10 of Aguila's survivors

Aguila's naval contingent included the Convoy Commodore, Vice Admiral PE Parker DSO, and his staff. At first OG 71's only escorts were the Norwegian Navy destroyer HNoMS Bath and two Royal Navy ships; the sloop HMS Leith and corvette Zinnia.

Two days out they were augmented by five more RN corvettes. On 17 August a Luftwaffe Focke-Wulf Fw 200 Condor sighted OG 71, and the next day it became the first convoy to be attacked by a U-boat wolfpack. Bath fell behind while defending the convoy, and in the small hours of 19 August at 0205 hrs she was torpedoed and sunk by U-204 400 nautical miles (740 km) southwest of Ireland. Three minutes later U-559 attacked the main convoy about 600 nautical miles (1,100 km) west of Ushant, sinking the cargo ship Alva. The corvette HMS Hydrangea went to rescue Bath's survivors, thus further depleting OG 71's escort, while HMS Campanula and the Irish Clonlara rescued Alva's survivors.

Two hours later the wolfpack again attacked OG 71, and U-201 torpedoed and sank Aguila and the cargo ship Ciscar. The corvette HMS Wallflower rescued 10 survivors including Captain Firth and one of the RN contingent. The tugboat Empire Oak rescued six of Aguila's crew (joining 11 she rescued from Alva), but on 22 August west of Porto U-564 sank Empire Oak, with the loss of all six of the men from Aguila (and nine of the 11 from Alva).

The wolfpack attack continued until 23 August, and OG 71's total losses were eight of her 23 merchant ships plus two of her escorts. Thereafter all neutral Irish ships were blacked out when sailing in Allied convoys.

== Monuments ==
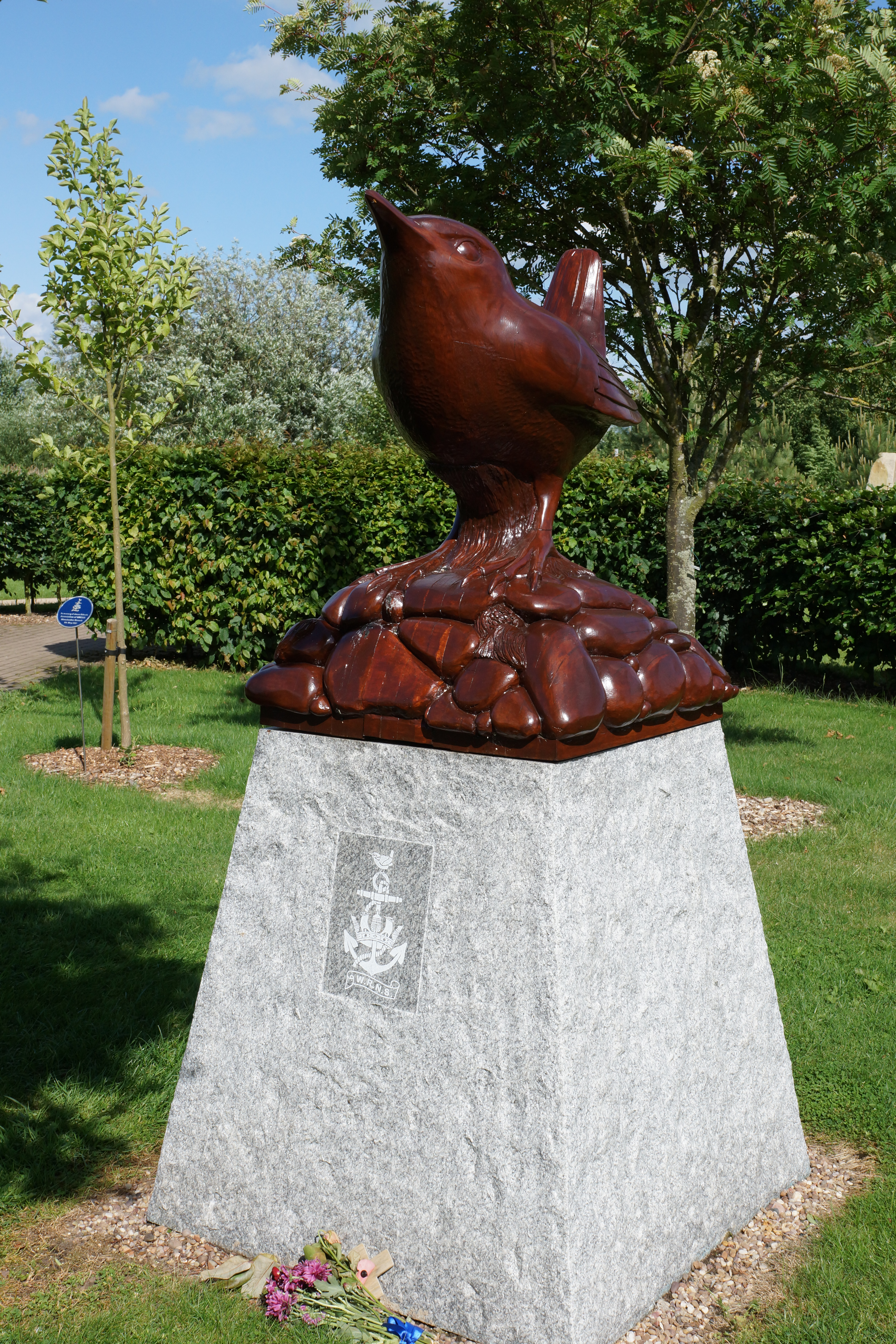
Aguila Memorial to the Wrens lost on Aguila

The lost members of Aguila's crew are commemorated in the Second World War section of the Merchant Navy War Memorial at Tower Hill in London. The lost members of her naval contingent are commemorated on the Royal Navy monuments at Chatham, Plymouth and Portsmouth.

A Black Swan-class sloop, HMS Wren, was launched in 1942. A plaque in her sick bay commemorated the 22 Wrens lost with Aguila. In 1951 the RNLI named a new Liverpool-class lifeboat Aguila Wren in their memory. It was stationed at Aberystwyth in Wales until 1964, and then at Redcar in Yorkshire until 1972.

The National Memorial Arboretum has an Aguila Memorial: a giant wren on a granite obelisk dedicated to the 22 Wrens and Sister Gribble. 12 of the Wrens had been based at Scarborough, North Yorkshire, where they are remembered by a memorial bench and plaque on the Lighthouse Pier that was dedicated in 1972.

== Sources ==
- Cook, Bernard (2006). Women and War: A Historical Encyclopedia from Antiquity to the Present. Santa Barbara, CA: ABC-CLIO. ISBN 1851097708.
- Crabb, Brian James (2006). Beyond the Call of Duty: The Loss of British Commonwealth Mercantile and Service Women at Sea During the Second World War. Donington: Shaun Tyas. ISBN 1 900289 66-0.
- Fletcher, Marjorie (1989). WRNS: A History of the Women's Royal Naval Service. London: BT Batsford. ISBN 0713461853.
- Mason, Ursula (1992). Britannia's daughters: the story of the WRNS. Barnsley: Leo Cooper. ISBN 0850522714.
