= Iokanga =

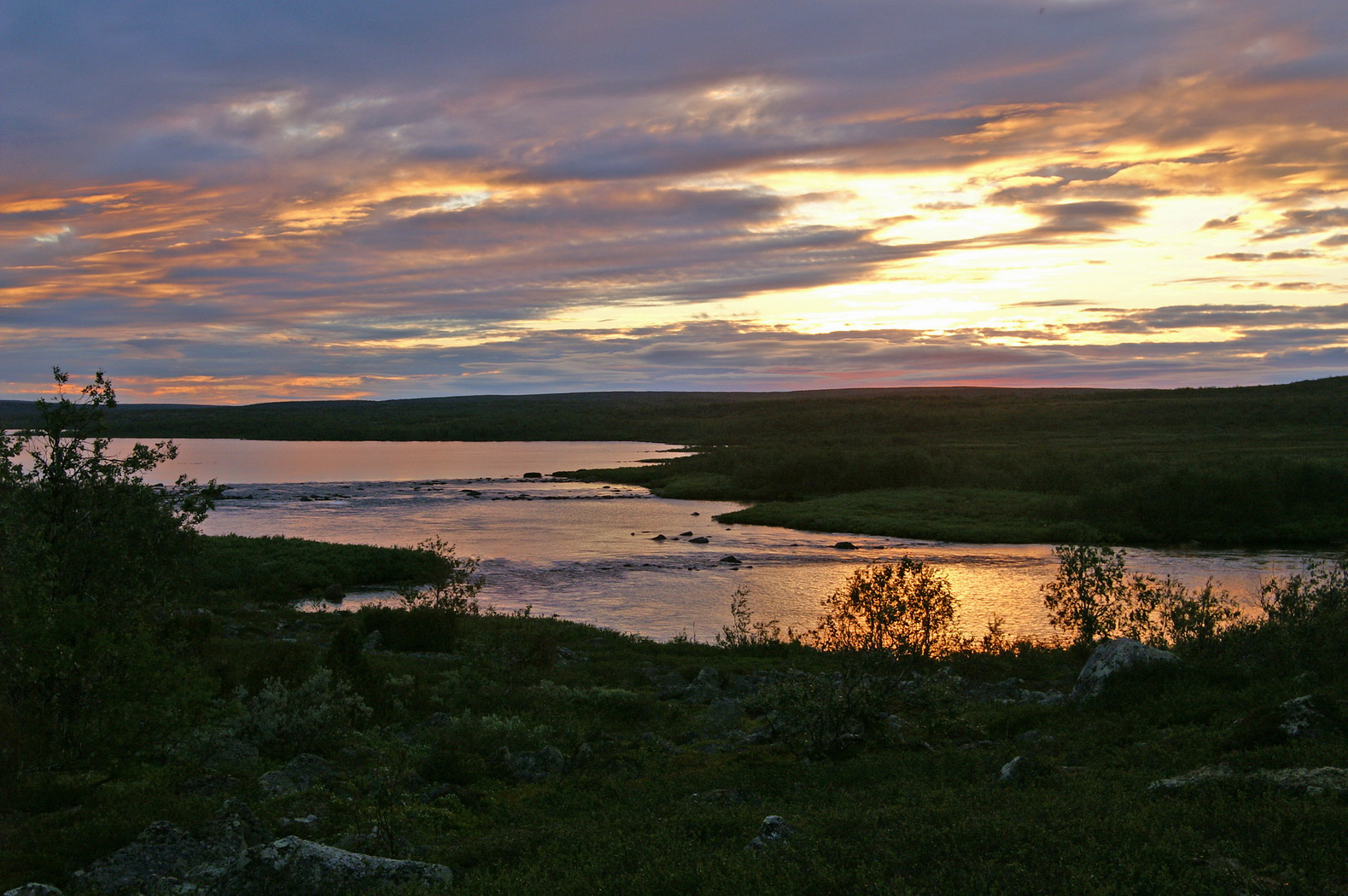

Location
- Country: Russia

Physical characteristics
- Mouth: Barents Sea
  - coordinates: 68°01′51″N 39°37′24″E
- Length: 137 km (85 mi)
- Basin size: 1,600 km^{2} (620 sq mi)

Basin features
- Tributaries
  - right: Rova, Sukhaya

The Iokanga (Russian: Иоканьга) is a river in the north of the Kola Peninsula in Murmansk Oblast, Russia. It is 203 km in length. The area of its basin is 6,020 km^{2}. The Iokanga originates in Lake Alozero and flows into the Barents Sea. Its biggest tributary is the Sukhaya. The river's indigenous Sami inhabitants have traditionally spoken the Ter Sami language. However, in the 1930s the largest Ter Sami village, Yokanga, was declared "perspectiveless" by the Soviet authorities and its inhabitants were forced to move to the Gremikha military base.

The Iokanga is famous for its salmon. With its strong current, huge boulders, and numerous pools, the Iokanga is picturesque as well as challenging. It is widely regarded as one of Russia's finest rivers for fishing. Until recently access to the river was only for Russians. Now, however, the river has been opened to foreign fishermen. Some of the largest specimens of the Atlantic salmon have been found in the river.

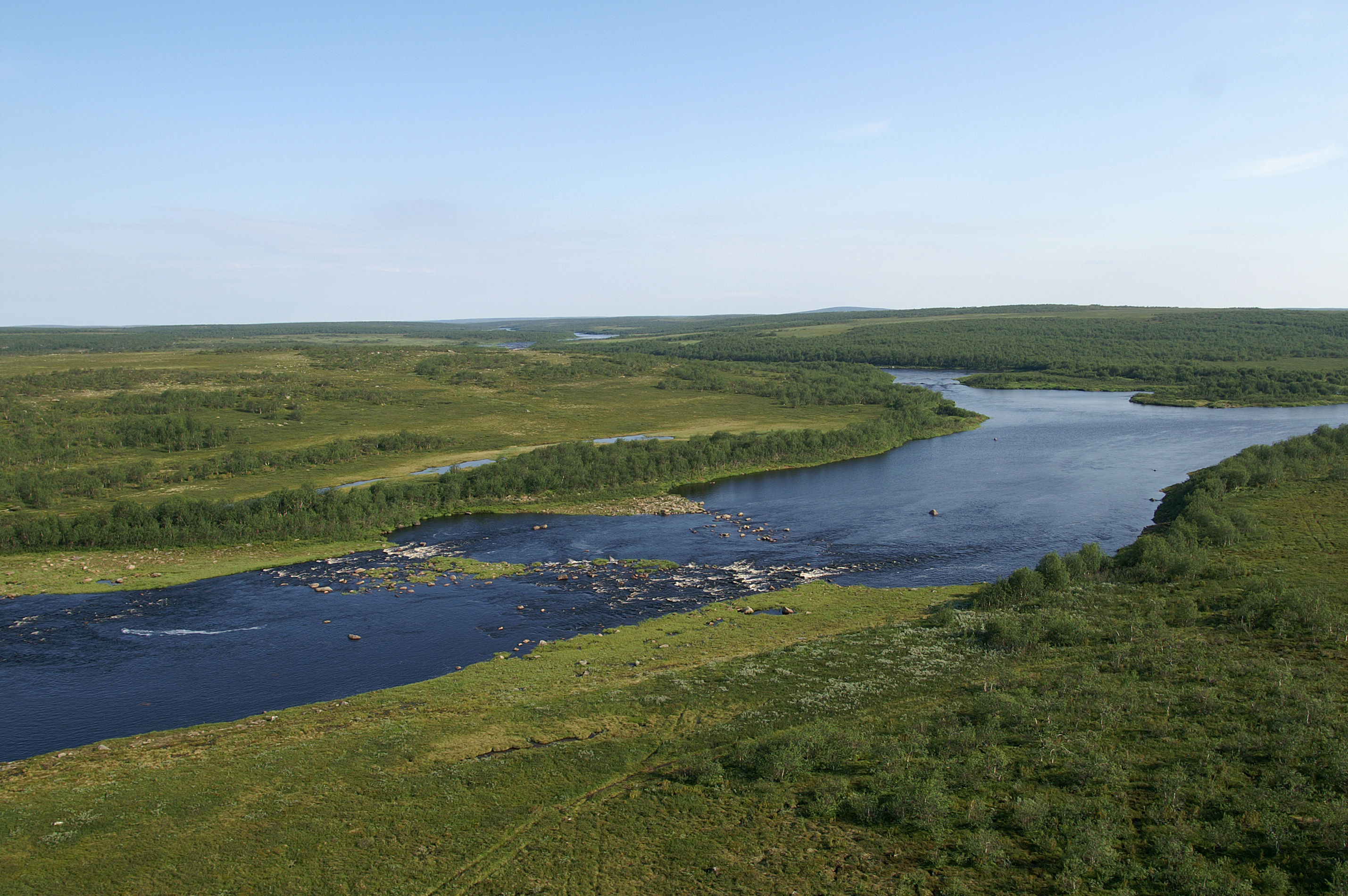
Iokanga river
