= Pihlalaid =

Island in Estonia

Coordinates: 58°38′55″N 22°32′36″E

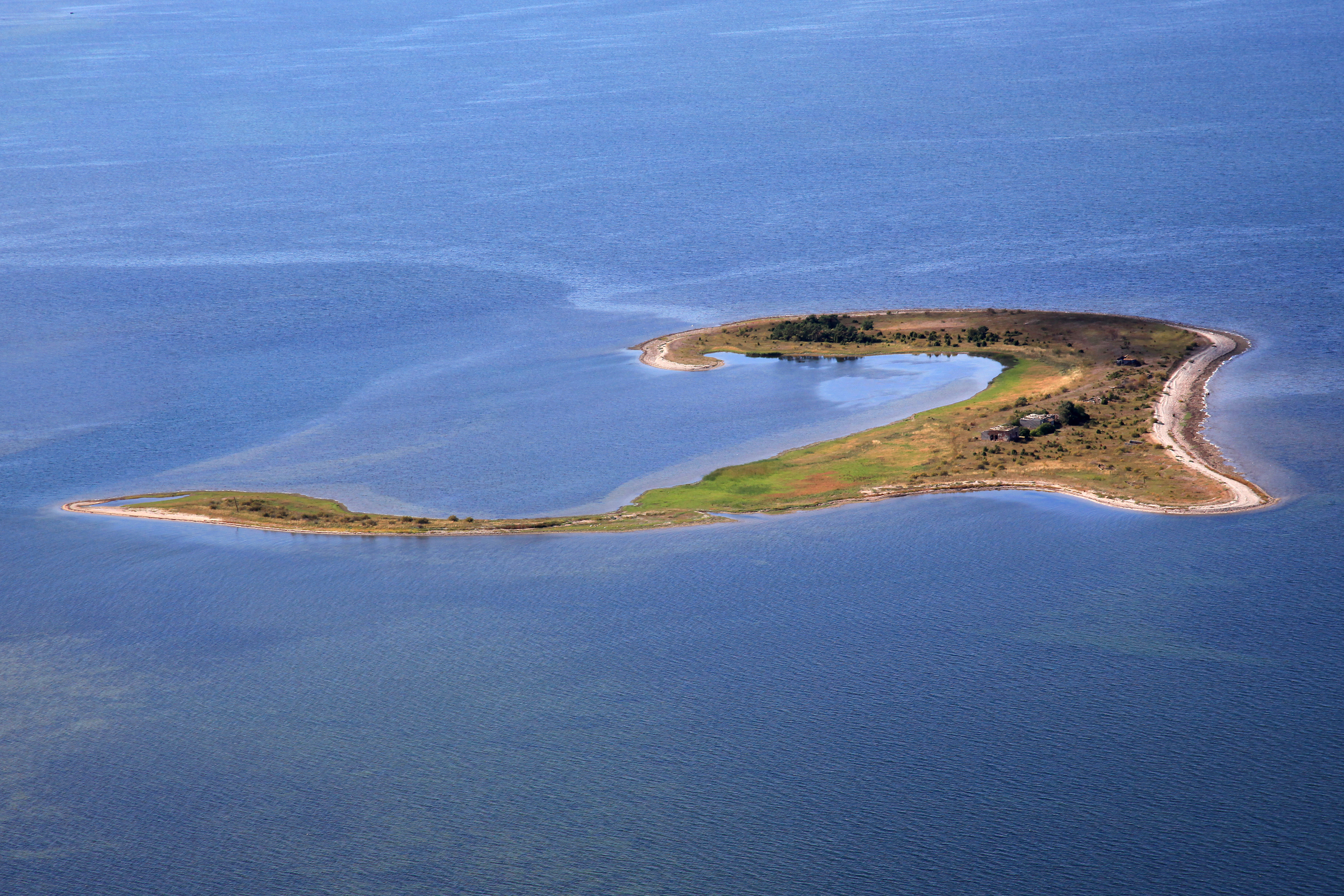
Pihlalaid

Pihlalaid is an island in Estonia. It is located in the north-central part of Saare County, 150 km southwest of Tallinn, the capital of the country. It covers an area of 0.07 square kilometers.

The terrain of Pihlalaid is very flat. The surroundings of Pihlalaid are mostly covered by mixed forest. The island is entirely unpopulated. The climate is continental. The average temperature is 4°C. The warmest month is July, with an average temperature of 18°C, and the coldest month is January, with an average temperature of −9°C.

== See also ==
- List of islands of Estonia
