= El Águila, Valle del Cauca =

El Águila
- Municipality and town
- Flag Coat of arms

- Location of the municipality and town of El Águila in the Valle del Cauca Department of Colombia.

- Location in Colombia
- Coordinates: 4°55′N 76°05′W
- Country: Colombia
- Department: Valle del Cauca Department

Area
  - Total: 199 km^{2} (77 sq mi)

Population (Census 2018)
  - Total: 7,393
  - Density: 37.2/km^{2} (96.2/sq mi)
- Time zone: UTC-5 (Colombia Standard Time)
- Website: http://www.elaguila-valle.gov.co/

El Águila (Spanish pronunciation: [el ˈaɣila]) is a town and municipality located in the Department of Valle del Cauca, Colombia.
