= Rova (river) =

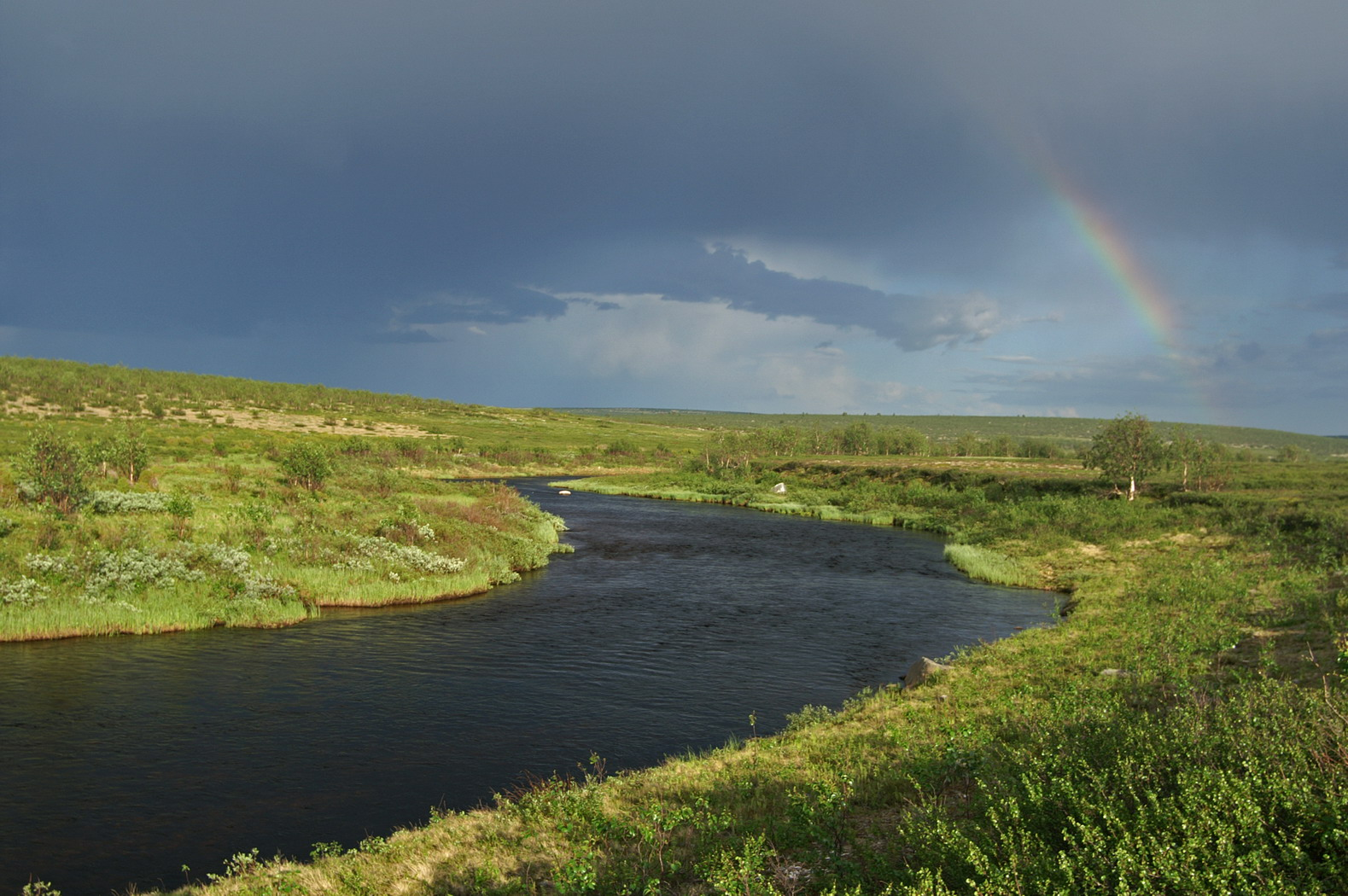
- Native name: Рова (Russian)

Location
- Country: Russia
- Region: Murmansk Oblast

Physical characteristics
- Mouth: Iokanga
  - coordinates: 67.6317°N 38.5442°E
  - elevation: 213 m (699 ft)
- Length: 49 km (30 mi)
- Basin size: 438 km^{2} (169 sq mi)

Basin features
- Progression: Iokanga→ Barents Sea

The Rova (Russian: Рова) is a river in the center of the Kola Peninsula in Murmansk Oblast, Russia. It is 49 kilometres (30 mi) long, and has a drainage basin of 438 square kilometres (169 sq mi). The Rova originates on the Keivy and flows into the Iokanga. Its biggest tributary is the Kalmyok.
