= Cynthia del Águila =

Guatemalan teacher and politician

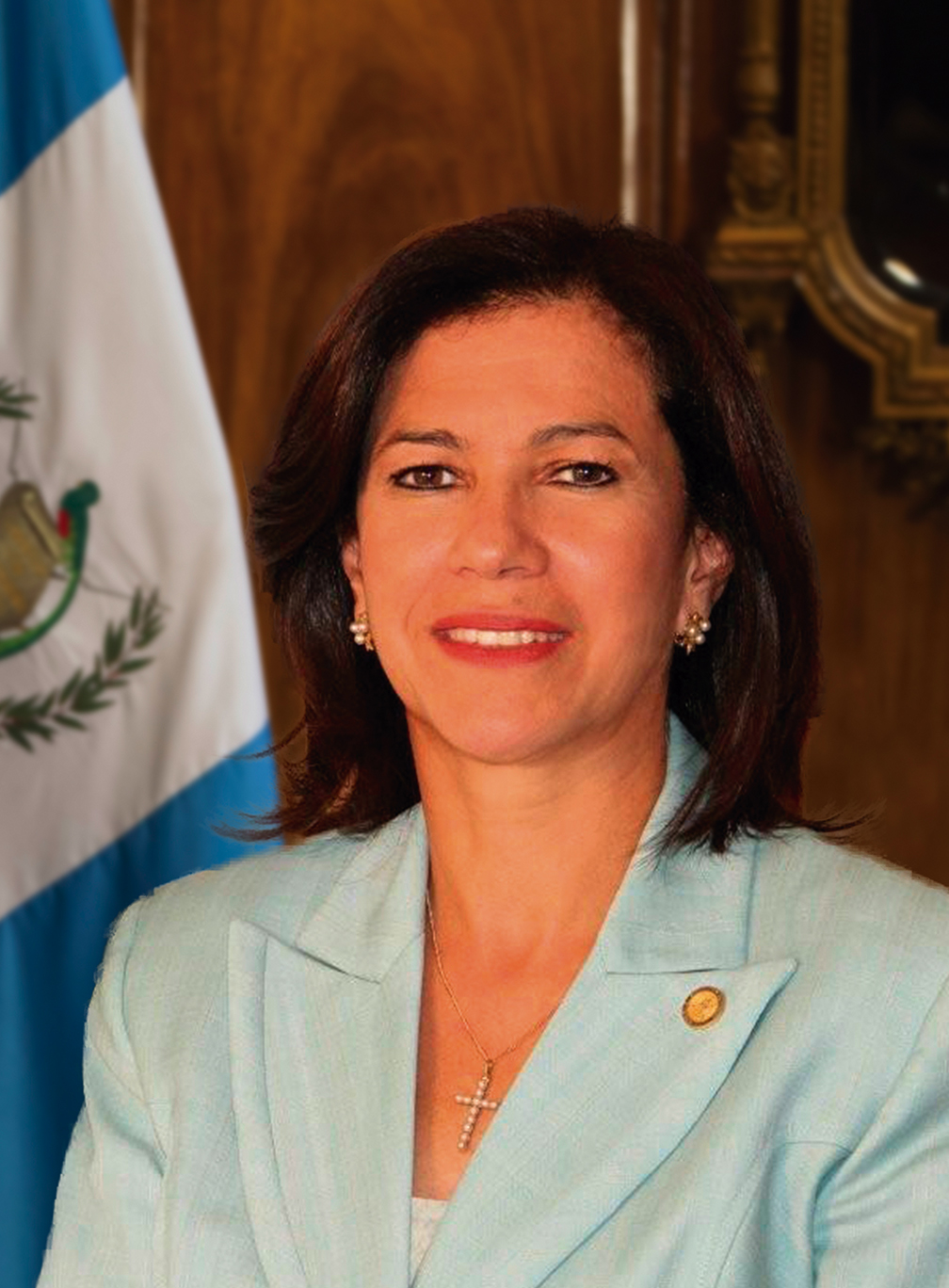
- Official portrait as Minister of Education.

Minister of Education of Guatemala
- In office 14 January 2012 – 22 August 2015
- President: Otto Pérez Molina
- Preceded by: Dennis Alonzo Mazariegos
- Succeeded by: Eligio Sic

Personal details
- Born: Cynthia Carolina del Águila Mendizábal de Sáenz de Tejada; 16 May 1959 (age 67) Guatemala City, Guatemala
- Education: Universidad del Valle de Guatemala
- Occupation: Teacher, politician

Cynthia Carolina del Águila Mendizábal de Sáenz de Tejada (born 16 May 1959) is a Guatemalan teacher and politician who served as the Minister of Education from 2012 to 2015.

== Biography ==
Cynthia del Águila was born in Guatemala City on 16 May 1959. She is a primary, secondary, and tertiary education teacher and holds a licentiate in Pedagogy from the Universidad del Valle de Guatemala, where she studied from 1982 to 1990. She took postgraduate studies at Michigan State University in the United States. From 1996 to 2000 she was Guatemala's Technical Vice Minister of Education. She served as director of planning, coordinator of the IBRF project, and quality manager of the Ministry of Education. She was also a member of the Consultative Commission on Educational Reform, a member of the Association for Research and Social Studies (ASIES), coordinator of the Great National Campaign for Education for several years, and is currently part of the latter's Advisory Committee. She also coordinated programs for secondary education teachers at the Universidad del Valle.

== Political life ==
On 15 November 2011, President Otto Pérez Molina confirmed Cynthia del Águila within his Council of Ministers as Minister of Education of Guatemala. She was sworn in by Molina on 14 January 2012.

Among her achievements in office is the creation of the "Leamos Juntos" (Let's Read Together) National Reading Program, which established 30 minutes of daily reading at all educational institutions in Guatemala and delivered large numbers of reading books for pre-primary, primary, and secondary schools.

As Minister she generated controversy for the reform of the teaching career, which went from being an educational program at the diversified level to being a profession at the university level. Until 2012, Guatemala was one of the few countries in the world where initial teacher training was maintained at the high school level. With this reform, aspiring primary school teachers must study for a baccalaureate for two years in high school and then enter university, where they attend a three-year program. Pre-primary teacher training is maintained at a diversified cycle level. This reform was rejected by students, who protested several times, occupying school buildings. At one such event in May 2012 they forcibly detained del Águila for several minutes. Local law enforcement and the National Civil Police intervened for her rescue.

In January 2015, the deputy of the Commitment, Renewal and Order (CREO) bloc, Selvin García, filed a writ of amparo against Cynthia del Águila, for not having fulfilled her promise to rebuild 381 schools that were damaged by the earthquake of 7 November 2012, which left 48 dead, 150 injured, and hundreds of homes damaged.

She resigned as Ministry of Education on 22 August 2015, at the same time as two other prominent officials, saying that she felt "disappointed and betrayed" by the Patriotic Party administration.
