= RNLB Aguila Wren =

History

RNLI Flag
- Name: Aguila Wren
- Owner: RNLI
- Operator: RNLI
- Builder: Groves & Guttridge, East Cowes, Isle of Wight
- Cost: About £14,000
- Yard number: 516
- Launched: 1951
- Christened: 28 June 1952
- Out of service: Retired from RNLI on 22 November 1972; Retired from Sea Cadets in early 1990s
- Identification: ON892
- Status: Undergoing restoration

General characteristics
- Class & type: Liverpool-class
- Tonnage: 8.6 tons
- Length: 35 ft 6 in (10.82 m)
- Beam: 10 ft 8 in (3.25 m)
- Propulsion: Twin screws; Twin 20 h.p. Ferry diesel engines (before 1973); Twin Perkins 4.108 diesels (after 1973)
- Crew: 7
- Notes: On 2 March 2009 National Historic Ships added Aguila Wren to the National Register of Historic Vessels (Certificate no 2242)

RNLB Aguila Wren (ON 892) is a retired Liverpool-class lifeboat of the Royal National Lifeboat Institution. She is currently being restored to her original RNLI condition, with work expected to be complete in 2017 or 2018. Aguila Wren was built as a memorial to 22 members of the Women's Royal Naval Service (WRNS) who were killed when their transport ship to Gibraltar, the Yeoward Line ship Aguila, was sunk by German submarine U-201 in the North Atlantic in 1941.

== Aguila ==
Aguila Wren was named to commemorate the sinking of the Yeoward Line ship Aguila, and the loss of 22 members of the Women's Royal Naval Service. Aguila had been part of a convoy from Liverpool to Gibraltar when she was torpedoed and sunk by German submarine U-201 in the early hours of 19 August 1941. 152 of the 168 people aboard Aguila were killed, including all 22 WRNS aboard.

== Collections ==
A voluntary collection was made by the WRNS in 1941, with all serving Wrens donating a day’s pay. This collection raised over £4,000, which was put towards the building a new Black Swan-class sloop HMS Wren, that William Denny and Brothers was building at Dumbarton. Also, the cost of the Sick Bay equipment on HMS Wren was subscribed to by relatives and friends of the 22 Wrens who were killed on Aguila. The balance of the money raised was donated to the Royal National Lifeboat Institution (RNLI) to pay for a new lifeboat to be a memorial to the 22 women who died, to be named Aguila Wren.

== Aguila Wren ==
=== As a lifeboat ===
The new lifeboat Aguila Wren was built in 1951 by Messrs. Groves & Guttridge at East Cowes, Isle of Wight. She served at Aberystwyth Lifeboat Station, Wales between 1951 and 1964, where she saved 14 lives, and at Redcar, North Yorkshire between 1965 and 1972, where she saved another 28 lives. She is a Liverpool-class lifeboat, with her hull formed of double diagonal-skinned Honduras mahogany laid on English oak frames. She is 35ft 6in long, 10 ft 8in beam, weighing around 8.6 tons. She has twin screws, originally powered by twin 20h.p. Ferry diesel engines although these bespoke-made engines were replaced in 1973 with twin Perkins 4.108 diesels.

Aguila Wren was named at Aberystwyth on 28 June 1952. Among those present were Captain Arthur Frith of Aguila and Dame Vera Laughton Mathews, former Director of the WRNS who had selected the 22 Wrens for Gibraltar service. The Aguila Wren was transferred away from Aberystwyth in 1964 following that station’s re-designation to an inshore lifeboat station. After a refit she arrived at Redcar in February 1965. Following her final life-saving rescue on 16 November 1972, to a yacht which had lost her propeller, she was replaced at Redcar by a new boat on 22 November 1972.

=== Sale to Sea Cadets ===
Her status as a war memorial led to discussions about the possibility of preserving Aguila Wren in a museum at Portsmouth, but these talks came to nothing. In order to preserve Aguila Wren from being sold, potentially for use as a fishing boat, Commander Peter Sturdee, who was at the time working for the RNLI at Head Office, arranged for her to be sold to a branch of the Sea Cadets to train potential naval ratings and Wrens. She left Redcar at 6am on the morning of 23 November 1972, stopped overnight at Spurn Point, Humber, and then sailed up the Humber to Keadby, near Scunthorpe, where she was handed over to the Scunthorpe Sea Cadets to become their training ship. The formal handing-over ceremony took place in Keadby on 20 May 1973, with Peter Sturdee formally presenting her to the Sea Cadet Corps. Also present was Captain Arthur Frith from Aguila.

As a training ship Aguila Wren sailed extensively around Britain and in Europe, including what was described as a "memorable trip" along the Rhine. She was sold after some 20 years of service with the Sea Cadets, and became a diving boat at Donnelly's Quay, South Shields . She was in a poor condition when she was found in mid-August 2004, bought by the son of one of her former shore crew members at Redcar, and put in storage.

== Restoration ==
In January 2006 she was moved with the sponsorship of P&O Ferries to a specialist firm of expert, timber-built lifeboat restorers, where she is currently being restored to her original RNLI condition, with completion expected in 2014. She will then become a memorial to the 22 WRNS killed on Aguila in 1941, and will attend regattas and exhibitions to raise funds for the RNLI. Aguila Wren has been registered with National Historic Ships, who have provided a grant of £2,000 towards the restoration project.

Restoration has included replanking of parts of the hull on the starboard side, new hull frames, replacement of all decking, restoration of the original steering and the making and fitting of new deck steps and seating port and starboard. Aguila Wren's original port and starboard navigation lights and her steaming light were tracked down to an owner in New Zealand who had bought them when he lived near Keadby; they were subsequently reacquired by Aguila Wren's present owner and have been refitted to the boat after a round trip of around 23,000 miles to New Zealand and back. The provisions and radio locker, the wheel and Kelvin-Hughes binnacle compass fitted to Aguila Wren as part of her restoration came from ON.881 City of Leeds, the lifeboat that Aguila Wren replaced at Redcar in 1965, with these parts being acquired in 2012.
