= Maria Rova =

American-German artist

Maria Rova (born 1964) is an American-German artist who is based in Fiji. In 1997, she founded Sigavou Studios in Nadi to showcase Fijian art.

== Biography ==
Rova was born in Uniontown, Pennsylvania in the United States of America. She studied education at the University of Birmingham in England, specialising in primary school teaching, and graduated in 1987.

Her art combines elements of Fijian culture with Western methods, such as using acrylic paints on traditional Fijian bark cloth.
