= SS Aguila (1909) =

British steamship sunk in 1915

History

United Kingdom
- Name: Aguila
- Namesake: Spanish for eagle
- Owner: Aguila SS Co Ltd
- Operator: Yeoward Brothers
- Port of registry: Liverpool
- Route: Liverpool – Canary Islands
- Builder: Caledon S&E, Dundee
- Yard number: 209
- Launched: 6 May 1909
- Completed: July 1909
- Identification: UK official number 127986; code letters HPKF; call sign GFF
- Fate: Sunk by shellfire and torpedo, 1915

General characteristics
- Type: passenger ship
- Tonnage: 2,114 GRT, 1,204 NRT
- Length: 275.4 ft (83.9 m)
- Beam: 38.0 ft (11.6 m)
- Depth: 17.0 ft (5.2 m)
- Decks: 2
- Installed power: 278 NHP
- Propulsion: 1 × triple-expansion engine; 1 × screw
- Crew: 42

SS Aguila was a British merchant steamship that was built in Scotland in 1909. She was one of a small fleet of ships that Yeoward Brothers ran between Liverpool and the Canary Islands, importing fruit to Britain, and carrying passengers in both directions. A U-boat sank her in 1915.

This was the first of two Yeoward Brothers ships that were named Aguila. The second Aguila was launched in 1916, and sunk by a U-boat in 1941.

== Building and identification ==
The Caledon Shipbuilding & Engineering Company in Dundee built Aguila as yard number 209. She was launched on 6 May 1909 and completed that July. Her registered length was 275.4 ft (83.9 m), her beam was 38.0 ft (11.6 m), and her depth was 17.0 ft (5.2 m). Her tonnages were 2,114 GRT and 1,204 NRT. She had a single screw, driven by a three-cylinder triple-expansion engine that was rated at 278 NHP.

Yeoward Brothers registered Aguila at Liverpool. Her United Kingdom official number was 127986, and her code letters were HPKF. The Aguila Steam Ship Company owned her. This was a one-ship company controlled by Yeoward Brothers. By 1914 she was equipped with wireless telegraphy. Her call sign was GFF.

== Loss ==
On 27 March 1915 Aguila was en route from Liverpool to the Canaries. At about 17:30 hrs U-28 intercepted her in St George's Channel and signalled her to stop. Aguila made full speed to try to escape. U-28 overhauled her and opened fire with her deck gun. Aguila hove to, and her crew and passengers abandoned ship on four lifeboats. U-28 continued to shell the ship as the boats were being launched, and then fired one torpedo, which sank her 47 nautical miles (87 km) southwest of the Smalls Lighthouse.

Six members of Aguila's complement were killed, including her Chief Engineer and a stewardess. Two passengers were also killed, and several crew members were wounded. U-28 hailed a trawler, Ottilie, and told its crew about the survivors in the four lifeboats. Ottilie found three of the boats, and landed them at Fishguard. Some hours later another trawler, St. Stephen, found the fourth boat, and landed survivors at Milford Haven.

The next day, U-28 torpedoed Falaba in the same area, killing 99 people.

== Bibliography ==
- Lloyd's Register of British and Foreign Shipping. Vol. I.–Steamers. London: Lloyd's Register of Shipping. 1910 – via Internet Archive.
- Lloyd's Register of Shipping. Vol. II.–Steamers. London: Lloyd's Register of Shipping. 1914 – via Internet Archive.
- The Marconi Press Agency Ltd (1914). The Year Book of Wireless Telegraphy and Telephony. London: The Marconi Press Agency Ltd.
- Mercantile Navy List. London. 1910 – via Crew List Index Project.
