= Empire Oak =

History

United Kingdom
- Name: Empire Oak
- Owner: Ministry of War Transport
- Operator: United Towing Ltd., Hull
- Builder: Goole Shipbuilding & Repairing Co. Ltd., Goole
- Launched: 15 March 1941
- Completed: July 1941
- Fate: Sunk by torpedo, 22 August 1941

General characteristics
- Type: Ocean-going tug
- Tonnage: 484 GRT
- Length: 43.6 m (143 ft 1 in)
- Beam: 9.2 m (30 ft 2 in)
- Depth: 4.6 m (15 ft 1 in)
- Propulsion: Triple expansion engine, 200 hp (149 kW)
- Armament: 1 × 12-pounder gun; 2 × Hotchkiss machine guns

Service record
- Commanders: Frederick E. Christian
- Operations: Convoy OG 17

Empire Oak was a 484 GRT ocean-going tug which was built by Goole Shipbuilding & Repairing Co. Ltd. of Goole. The ship was launched on 15 March 1941 and completed in July 1941. She was torpedoed on 22 August 1941 and sunk by U-564 at 40°41′N 11°39′W while a member of Convoy OG 71.

She was armed with a 12-pounder and two Hotchkiss machine guns. She also carried two PAC (parachute and cable) rockets.

== Ship history ==
She sailed from Oban on 15 August 1941, captained by F.E. Christian, and joined Convoy OG 71 (Outward Gibraltar). On 19 August 1941, she joined the search for survivors from the merchantman Alva which had been sunk by U-559, and spent approximately an hour searching and picked up several survivors before putting on speed to catch up with the convoy. On returning to the convoy Captain Christian spotted starshells going up, on arrival he spotted a number of red lights in the water which he took to be the red lights attached to merchantmen's lifejackets (at this time Royal Navy lifejackets did not). These were survivors from the merchantman Aguila, and after a long search Empire Oak picked up six crew members.

On 22 August 1941, during the night Captain Christian was standing on the starboard wing of the bridge when Empire Oak was struck by a torpedo fired from U-564 on the starboard side of the engine room. She sank within seconds with the captain been washed off the bridge. The destroyer HMS Boreas then launched a depth charge attack on U-564, the shock waves of which caused distress and injuries to the survivors in the water. Captain Christian was in the water for over two hours with his chief officer plus the chief officer from Aguila before the corvette HMS Campanula found them, unfortunately during the rescue the chief officer from the Aguila became separated and was lost. Empire Oak lost 14 out of her 20 crew, she was also carrying 6 survivors from Aguila and 11 from Alva, nine of these were lost including all from Aguila.
