= Hermann Rasch =

German U-boat commander

- Born: 26 August 1914; Wilhelmshaven, German Empire
- Died: 10 June 1974 (aged 59); Hamburg, West Germany
- Military career
- Allegiance: Nazi Germany
- Branch: Kriegsmarine
- Rank: Kapitänleutnant
- Commands: U-106
- Conflicts: World War II: Battle of the Atlantic
- Awards: Knight's Cross of the Iron Cross

Hermann Rasch (26 August 1914 – 10 June 1974) was a German U-boat commander of U-106 in World War II. He was a recipient of the Knight's Cross of the Iron Cross of Nazi Germany.

On 14 May 1942, Reinhard Suhren, commander of U-564, sunk the Mexican oil tanker Potrero del Llano. The sinking of this ship, compounded with U-106's attack on another tanker, the Faja de Oro, compelled Mexico to declare war on the Axis powers.

== Military Service ==
Rasch began his naval service in April 1934. He entered the U-boat force in April 1940, reporting to U-106 in September of that year. After attending a commander school, he assumed command of U-106 in October 1941. U-106 went on six patrols in the Atlantic and the Gulf of Mexico from October 1941 until his departure in April of 1943, accounting for 12 ships sunk, and another two damaged. Following U-106, Rasch served as an Admiral Staff Officer with the Oberkommando der Kriegsmarine (Naval High Command). He then served as commander of Kommando der Kleinkampfverbände (Midget Combat Units Command), overseeing operations with Seehund- and Biber-class midget u-boats, from October 1944 until the end of the war.

Date of Rank	Rank
April 1934	Seekadett
July 1935	Fähnrich zur See
April 1937	Leutnant zur See
April 1939	Oberleutnant zur See
March 1942	Kapitänleutnant

== Post-war and death ==
After the war, Rasch spent a year in Allied captivity. He then left the navy and worked as a journalist; most notably, as editor-in-chief of der Mittag, a Düsseldorf-based midday newspaper.

Hermann Rasch died in Hamburg, West Germany on 10 June 1974, aged 59.

== Awards ==
- Wehrmacht Long Service Award 4th Class (8 April 1938)
- Spanish Cross in Bronze without Swords (6 June 1939)
- Iron Cross (1939) 1st Class (11 July 1941)
- Knight's Cross of the Iron Cross on 29 December 1942 as Kapitänleutnant and commander of U-106
