= Reinhard Suhren =

German WW2 U-Boat commander

- Reinhard Suhren
- Born: 16 April 1916; Langenschwalbach, Taunus, German Empire
- Died: 25 August 1984 (aged 68); Halstenbek, Hamburg, West Germany
- Burial place: Ohlsdorf Cemetery in Hamburg
- Relatives: Gerd Suhren
- Military career
- Allegiance: Nazi Germany
- Branch: Kriegsmarine
- Service years: 1935–1945
- Rank: Fregattenkapitän (Frigate Captain)
- Nickname: Teddy
- Units: SSS Gorch Fock; Emden destroyer Z3 Max Schultz; 1st U-boat Flotilla; 27th U-boat Flotilla
- Commands: U-564, 3 April 1941 – 1 October 1942; F.d.U. Nordmeer
- Conflicts: World War II: Battle of the Atlantic
- Awards: Knight's Cross of the Iron Cross with Oak Leaves and Swords
- Other work: Petroleum industry

Reinhard Johann Heinz Paul Anton Suhren (16 April 1916 – 25 August 1984) was a German U-boat commander in World War II and younger brother of Korvettenkapitän (Ing.) and Knight's Cross of the Iron Cross recipient Gerd Suhren.

Suhren was born in Langenschwalbach, the second of four children, and grew up in the Weimar Republic and Nazi Germany. He joined the navy in 1935 and began his U-boat career in March 1938. He spent a year as 1st watch officer on U-48 where he received the Knights Cross of the Iron Cross for his contribution in the sinking of 200,000 gross register tons (GRT) of merchant shipping. In April 1941 he took command of U-564. As a commander, he is credited with the sinking of 18 merchant vessels of 95,544 GRT, 1 warship of 900 long tons (910 tonnes) and damaged four merchant vessels of 28,907 GRT for which he was awarded the Knight's Cross of the Iron Cross with Oak Leaves and Swords.

Suhren left the boat and became an instructor in October 1942. He then served in the 27th U-boat Flotilla along with Korvettenkapitän Erich Topp. During the last year of the war Fregattenkapitän Suhren was the Führer der Unterseeboote Norwegen (Leader of U-boats in Norwegian waters) and from September 1944 the Commander-in-Chief of U-boats of the North Sea. After the war he worked in the petroleum industry and died of stomach cancer on 25 August 1984.

== Childhood, education and early career ==
Suhren was born on 16 April 1916 in Langenschwalbach in the Taunus in his grandmothers house. He was the second child of Geert Suhren and his wife Ernestine Ludovika Suhren, née Ludovika. Suhren had an older brother Gerd and a younger brother Ernst, and sister Almut. He received his Abitur from the Landständischen Oberschule in Bautzen. Prior to graduation, during his last summer vacation, Suhren was allowed and accepted at a sailing course at the Hanseatic Yacht School in Neustadt in Holstein. The course had some paramilitary components and learning to march was one of them. During one of these marches the boy behind Suhren yelled out: "Hey Reinhard, when I look at you marching, it reminds me of a Teddy bear." Later, the same boy met Suhren again during basic military training and greeted Suhren with the words: "Hey, Teddy, you're here too?" The nickname "Teddy" would stick with him from then on.

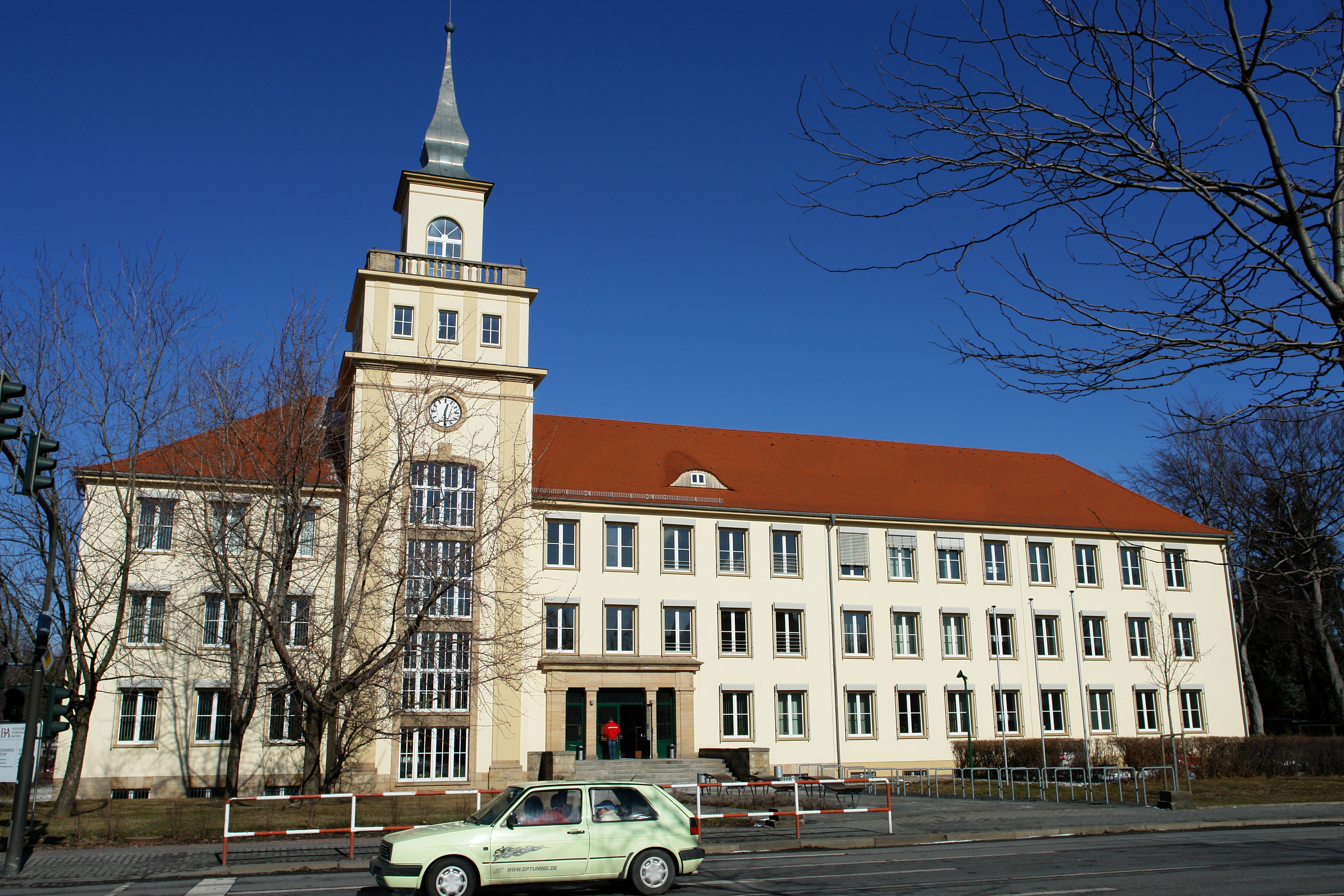
Landständische Oberschule in Bautzen

He began his naval career with the Reichsmarine on 5 April 1935 as a member of "Crew 35" (the incoming class of 1935). (Note: The German Reichsmarine was renamed to Kriegsmarine on 1 June 1935.) He received his military basic training in the 2nd company in the 2nd department of the standing ship division of the Baltic Sea in Stralsund (5 April 1935 – 17 June 1935). (Note: 2nd company—2. Kompanie) (Note: 2nd department—II. Abteilung) (Note: standing ship division—Schiffsstammdivision) He was then transferred to the school ship Gorch Fock (18 June 1935 – 26 September 1935) attaining the rank of Seekadett (midshipman) on 25 September 1935. Following his promotion he was posted to the light cruiser Emden (27 September 1935 – 16 June 1936).

Suhren sailed on Emden's sixth training cruise, which started on 23 October 1935 and took him and her crew to the Azores, West Indies and Venezuela, through the Panama Canal to Guayaquil, where they celebrated Christmas. The journey then continued to Puerto San José and Portland, Oregon to Honolulu. From Honolulu they continued to Middle America, back through the Panama Canal and after visiting a few harbours in the West Indies to Baltimore and Montreal. Their final stopover was Pontevedra, Spain before they returned home on 11 June 1936.

Following his journey on Emden, Suhren attended the main cadet course at the Naval Academy Mürwik (20 June 1936 – 31 March 1937). (Note: main cadet course—Hauptlehrgang für Fähnriche) This course was briefly interrupted for two navigational training courses, the first on the tender Nordsee (10–15 August 1936) and the second on the steamer Hecht (16–21 November 1936). During this time frame at the naval academy he advanced in rank to Fähnrich zur See (officer cadet) on 1 July 1936. His military career almost came to an unexpected end on Rosenmontag (Rose Monday), the highlight of the German "Karneval" (carnival), 8 February 1937. The cadets of "Crew 1935" had been given special leave to celebrate carnival. Every company had to be back at the academy by 6:00, except for Suhren's company, who had to return by 5:00. Suhren missed the curfew and was reported to the company chief. Naval cadets at the time were rated on scale of 1 to 9 regarding the service worthiness (Diensttüchtigkeit). Prior to this incidence, Suhren was rated at 7.5, which had placed him at the top of his class. After this incidence, he was down rated to 4, later corrected to 5, which then placed him last in his class. The service worthiness rating in combination with the officers' final exam would determine the ranking in the navy and had implications on an officers' future naval career. Suhren was especially disappointed by the behavior of his commanding officer, his group commander Kapitänleutnant Walther Kölle. Kölle, who was present during the inquiry, could have spoken on Suhren's behalf, but chose to remain quiet.

He then underwent a number of specialized training courses which included a torpedo course in Mürwik (1 April – 19 May 1937), (Note: torpedo course for cadets—Torpedolehrgang für Fähnriche) an anti-aircraft artillery course at Wilhelmshaven (20 May – 7 June 1937), (Note: anti-aircraft artillery course for cadets—Fla-Waffenlehrgang für Fähnriche) a pathfinder course for cadets at Kiel-Wik (8–12 June 1937), (Note: pathfinder course for cadets—Sperrlehrgang für Fähnriche) a communication course for cadets at Mürwik again (13 June – 3 July 1937), (Note: communication course for cadets—Nachrichtenlehrgang für Fähnriche) a naval infantry course for cadets at Stralsund (4–28 July 1937), (Note: infantry course for cadets—Infanterielehrgang für Fähnriche) and lastly an artillery course for cadets at Kiel-Wik (29 July – 2 October 1937). (Note: artillery course for cadets—Artillerielehrgang für Fähnriche) Suhren was then transferred to the destroyer Z3 Max Schultz (3 October 1937 – 29 March 1938) for further ship based training. On this assignment he was promoted to Oberfähnrich zur See (Senior Ensign) on 1 January 1938.

Max Schultz at the time was under the command of Korvettenkapitän (Corvette Captain) Martin Baltzer. Baltzer would later be promoted in rank to Vizeadmiral (Vice Admiral) and hold the position of chief of the Marinepersonalamt (Naval Personnel Office) in the Oberkommando der Marine. Suhren and Baltzer did not share a positive personal relationship during their career. According to Suhren, their conflict began during their mutual time on Max Schultz. Suhren claimed that later during his career, Baltzer personally prevented him from advancing in rank to Kapitän zur See (Captain at Sea).

Suhren career with the U-boat force started on 30 March 1938 with his assignment to the U-boat school. In parallel he attended another torpedo course (30 March – 11 June 1938) at Flensburg. He was promoted to Leutnant zur See (Second Lieutenant) on 1 April 1938. His training at the U-boat school included a specialized U-boat Torpedo Officer course (13 June – 2 July 1938) and U-boat course (3 July – 28 August 1938) which concluded his stay at the U-boat school. As a second Watch Officer he served on U-51, U-46 and U-47, under the command of Günther Prien, from 6 November 1938 to 21 April 1939 in the Wegener Flotilla.

== World War II ==
The German invasion of Poland began on 1 September 1939, and marked the beginning of World War II in Europe. Suhren spent one and a half years as first Watch Officer on U-48 (22 April 1939 – 9 November 1940) going on nine war patrols. Here he served under the command of Herbert Schultze on five war patrols, under Hans-Rudolf Rösing on two war patrols, and under Heinrich Bleichrodt for a further two war patrols. Otto Ites was the second Watch Officer and Horst Hofmann the coxswain on all of these patrols, and Erich Zürn was the chief engineer on all but three patrols. Suhren received the Knight's Cross of the Iron Cross (Ritterkreuz des Eisernen Kreuzes) for assisting in the sinking of 200,000 gross register tons (GRT) of allied shipping. The award had been requested by Bleichrodt on account of his Knight's Cross presentation by Karl Dönitz, at the time Vizeadmiral and Befehlshaber der Unterseeboote (Commander of the Submarines). Bleichrodt expressed that he would refuse to wear his Knight's Cross if Suhren was not also honoured. He argued that the success of U-48 was more so attributed to Suhren than himself as commander. The request, with the support of Engelbert Endrass, was approved and the Knight's Cross was presented by Hans-Georg von Friedeburg, the 2nd Admiral of the U-boats and responsible for staffing.

On this occasion Suhren inquired when he would be given command of his own U-boat. Von Friedburg responded that Dönitz had given the order that a U-boat commander had to be at least 25 years of age before receiving his own command. Suhren was still six months shy of this criterion and had to be "parked" before he could take command of a U-boat. To breach this period (10 November 1940 – 2 March 1941), he was sent to lecture at the torpedo firing school of the 24th U-boat Flotilla in Memel, present-day Klaipėda. At the same time he was listed as a commander-in-training. While serving on U-48, a total of 119 torpedoes were fired; 65 torpedoes were aimed and fired by Suhren while U-48 was surfaced, 30 of which found their mark.

=== Command of U-564 ===
In April 1941 he took command of U-564, a Type VIIC U-boat. Construction training began at the Blohm & Voss shipbuilding works in Hamburg on 3 March 1941. A month later, on 3 April, U-564 was commissioned into the 1st U-boat Flotilla. Work-up and training was done with AGRU-Front in Hela in the Eastern Baltic Sea. (Note: Technische Ausbildungsgruppe für Front U-Boote—technical training group for front-line U-boats) Suhren's chief engineer (Leitender Ingenieur) on U-564 was Oberleutnant zur See (Ing.) Ulrich Gabler. After World War II, Gabler became one of the leading experts on conventional submarine construction and honorary professor at the University of Hamburg for shipbuilding. Suhren had recommended Gabler for the Knight's Cross of the Iron Cross, a request that was turned down and Gabler received the German Cross in Gold (Deutsches Kreuz in Gold) on 15 October 1942. U-564 was in Gotenhafen, present-day Gdynia, when on 5 May, Adolf Hitler and Wilhelm Keitel, with a large entourage, arrived to visit the battleships Bismarck and Tirpitz, which were also in Gotenhafen at the time. Suhren, and his brother Gerd, who also happened to be in Gotenhafen at the time, both already decorated with the Knight's Cross, were invited to lunch with Hitler and his entourage.

Suhren's first patrol (17 June 1941 – 27 July 1941) as a commander, his tenth overall, took U-564 from Kiel to Brest. On this patrol into the North Atlantic he was credited with sinking three ships of 18,678 GRT and further damaging one ship of 9,467 GRT.

On his second patrol (16 August 1941 – 27 August 1941) from Brest he sank two ships of 2,587 GRT and the British corvette HMS Zinnia, of 900 metric tons (890 long tons; 990 short tons).

==== Third patrol and Oak Leaves ====
Following his third patrol (16 September 1941 – 1 November 1941) Suhren was awarded the Knight's Cross of the Iron Cross with Oak Leaves (Ritterkreuz des Eisernen Kreuzes mit Eichenlaub) on 31 December 1941. The patrol had left Brest and headed for the North Atlantic, North Channel, before Gibraltar, and Cape Trafalgar. U-564 was resupplied with fuel at Cádiz, Spain before arriving in Lorient, France. On this patrol he was credited with sinking three ships of 7,198 GRT, including the SS Carsbreck on 24 October 1941.

==== Fourth patrol ====
The fourth patrol (11 January 1942 – 6 March 1942) left Lorient on 11 January 1942 and took U-564 to La Pallice on 12 January. They left La Pallice again on 18 January heading for the East Coast of the United States and arrived in Brest on 6 March 1942. On this patrol he sank one ship of 11,410 GRT and damaged another of 6,195 GRT. Suhren had to abort the patrol prematurely as the muzzle doors of the torpedo tubes had been damaged in a collision with U-107 off of Cape Hatteras.

==== Fifth patrol ====
Suhren took U-564 on its fifth patrol (4 April 1942 – 6 June 1942) back to the East Coast of the United States again, departing and returning to Brest. Although a number of torpedoes malfunctioned on this patrol, four ships of 24,390 GRT were sunk and another two of 13,245 GRT damaged. On 14 May 1942 he sunk the Mexican oil tanker Potrero del Llano. The sinking of this ship, compounded with U-106's attack on another tanker, the Faja de Oro, on 21 May 1942, would bring Mexico to declare "A State of War" on the Axis powers.

==== Sixth patrol and Swords ====
After returning from his last and longest mission, when U-564 came to the port of Brest, Suhren greeted his friend Horst Uphoff—named Hein and commander of U-84—with the words "Hein, Hein, sind die Nazis noch am Ruder?" Literally translating to "Hein, Hein, are the Nazis still at the rudder?" This made news in the entire U-Boat service.

— Reinhard Suhren

Suhren's sixth, last and longest patrol (9 July 1942 – 18 September 1942) as a U-boat commander left Brest on 9 July 1942 and took U-564 to Lorient on 10 July. One day later, on 11 July, they left port again, heading for the Mid-Atlantic, West-Atlantic, Caribbean Sea near Trinidad. On this patrol he sank five ships of 32,181 GRT for which he was awarded the Knight's Cross of the Iron Cross with Oak Leaves and Swords (Ritterkreuz des Eisernen Kreuzes mit Eichenlaub und Schwertern) on 1 September 1942. U-564 returned to Brest on 18 September 1942. Among the ships he attacked were from the 14-ship "TAW" convoy, which left port at Trinidad. While on patrol Suhren was attacked by an Allied aircraft and was forced to dive to 200 meters (660 feet)—perilously close to crushing depth.

On 23 July 1942 U-564 and U-203, under the command of Rolf Mützelburg, met at sea in the relative safety of the Mid-Atlantic gap. The reason for this meeting was that U-564's Matrosen-Gefreiter Ernst Schlittenhard had fallen ill, requiring hospitalization. Suhren had requested Schlittenhard to be transferred to U-203, which was heading back to port. During this meeting Suhren witnessed Mützelburg's daring diving stunts from the conning tower into the sea. In a one-to-one conversation with Mützelburg, Suhren criticized this behavior, pointing out the risks. Less than two months later, on 11 September 1942, Mützelburg would succumb to injuries sustained when he struck the deck head-first.

=== Ashore ===
By his own account, Suhren managed to get himself invited to the Berghof, Hitler's home in the Obersalzberg, following the presentation of the Swords to his Knight's Cross. In his account, he received a call from Erich Topp who was already at the Berghof, to come and join him. Suhren bluntly approached Martin Bormann, Hitler's private secretary, and thanked him for the invitation to the Berghof, an invitation which had not been expressed until then. Bormann acknowledged, thus confirming the invitation.

In October 1942 he left the boat and became an instructor. Later he served in the 27th U-boat Flotilla along with Korvettenkapitän Topp. On 27 May 1944, Dönitz appointed Suhren was Führer der Unterseeboote in Norwegian waters and from September 1944 for the North Sea. On 1 June, he was promoted to Fregattenkapitän.

== Later life ==
Suhren was taken prisoner of war by British forces in Oslo, Norway, where he and Rösing were imprisoned in the Akershus Fortress for a year. Here he received news that his parents and sister committed suicide in 1945, after failing to escape from the Sudetenland. He was released from captivity on 12 April 1946 and traveled to Germany where he first stayed with friends in Bad Schwartau.

Suhren had married Jutta-Beatrix and had a daughter called Beatrix, the daughter of a Luftwaffe staff officer, in 1943. Suhren had managed to evacuate both his wife and his mother-in-law from Danzig to Oberstdorf in the Allgäu region of the Bavarian Alps in early 1945. Here his wife worked at an American officer's casino where she befriended an American soldier. Consequently, the marriage ended in divorce. Suhren married his second wife Hannelore. The marriage produced three daughters named Katrin, Gesa and Mara.

Suhren was asked multiple times to join the military service in the Bundeswehr, the post World War II armed forces of the Federal Republic of Germany. He refused, declaring that he could not serve in a navy which looked down upon all former soldiers of Wehrmacht as criminals.

The Bundesmarine lost U-Hai, a modernized type XXIII submarine formerly U-2365, in a storm on 14 September 1966 roughly 138 nautical miles (256 km; 159 mi) northwest of Helgoland in the Dogger Bank. Only the cook, Obermaat Peter Silbernagel, survived the sinking, 19 members of the crew including the commander, Oberleutnant zur See Joachim-Peter Wiedersheim, lost their lives. The German news magazine Der Spiegel interviewed Suhren on the possible causes of the sinking. The article was published on 10 October 1966. In this interview Suhren carefully alluded to a possible cause. He suggested that lack of proper training could have been a factor.

Suhren died of stomach cancer on 25 August 1984. The funeral ceremony was held on 5 September 1984 at the Ohlsdorf Cemetery, near Hamburg. Among those attending were Herbert Schultze, Erich Topp, Eberhard Godt, Otto Kretschmer, Klaus Bargsten, Hans Meckel and Peter-Erich Cremer. The Bundeswehr provided an honour guard as a mark of respect. According to his last will, his cremated remains were buried at sea where U-564 was lost. U-564 had been sunk on 14 June 1943, north-west of Cape Ortegal, in position 46°30′N 07°18′W by an Armstrong Whitworth Whitley aircraft. There were 18 survivors from U-564 including the commander, 28 of her crew perished.

== Summary of career ==
Suhren, as 1st Watch Officer on U-48, was credited with the destruction 200,000 GRT of merchant shipping. He further sank 18 merchant ships for a total of 95,544 GRT, 1 warship sunk for a total of 900 long tons (910 tonnes) and damaged 4 ships for a total of 28,907 GRT as commander of U-564.

| Date | U-boat | Name of Ship | Nationality | Tonnage | Fate |
|---|---|---|---|---|---|
| 27 June 1941 | U-564 | Kongsgaard | Norway | 9,467 | Damaged at 60°00′N 30°42′W |
| 27 June 1941 | U-564 | Maasdam | Netherlands | 8,812 | Sunk at 60°00′N 30°35′W |
| 27 June 1941 | U-564 | Malaya II | United Kingdom | 8,651 | Sunk at 59°56′N 30°35′W |
| 29 June 1941 | U-564 | Hekla | Iceland | 1,215 | Sunk at 58°20′N 43°00′W |
| 22 August 1941 | U-564 | Clonlara | Ireland | 1,203 | Sunk at 40°43′N 11°39′W |
| 22 August 1941 | U-564 | Empire Oak | United Kingdom | 484 | Sunk at 40°43′N 11°39′W |
| 23 August 1941 | U-564 | HMS Zinnia (K98) | Royal Navy | 900 | Sunk at 40°25′N 10°40′W |
| 24 October 1941 | U-564 | Alhama; Possibly also fired at by U-563 | United Kingdom | 1,352 | Sunk at 35°42′N 10°58′W |
| 24 October 1941 | U-564 | Ariosto | United Kingdom | 2,176 | Sunk at 36°20′N 10°50′W |
| 24 October 1941 | U-564 | Carsbreck | United Kingdom | 3,670 | Sunk at 36°20′N 10°50′W |
| 11 February 1942 | U-564 | Victolite | Canada | 11,410 | Sunk at 36°12′N 67°14′W |
| 16 February 1942 | U-564 | Opalia | United Kingdom | 6,195 | Damaged at 37°38′N 66°07′W |
| 3 May 1942 | U-564 | Ocean Venus | United Kingdom | 7,174 | Sunk at 28°21′N 80°23′W |
| 4 May 1942 | U-564 | Eclipse | United Kingdom | 9,767 | Damaged at 26°30′N 80°00′W |
| 5 May 1942 | U-564 | Delisle | United States | 3,478 | Damaged at 27°06′N 80°03′W |
| 8 May 1942 | U-564 | Ohioan | United States | 6,078 | Sunk at 26°31′N 79°59′W |
| 9 May 1942 | U-564 | Lubrafol | Panama | 7,138 | Sunk at 26°26′N 80°00′W |
| 14 May 1942 | U-564 | Potrero del Llano | Mexico | 4,000 | Sunk at 25°35′N 80°06′W |
| 19 July 1942 | U-564 | Empire Hawksbill | United Kingdom | 5,724 | Sunk at 42°29′N 25°56′W |
| 19 July 1942 | U-564 | Lavington Court | United Kingdom | 5,372 | Sunk at 42°38′N 25°28′W |
| 19 August 1942 | U-564 | SS British Consul | United Kingdom | 6,940 | Sunk at 11°58′N 62°38′W |
| 19 August 1942 | U-564 | SS Empire Cloud | United Kingdom | 5,969 | Sunk at 11°58′N 62°38′W |
| 30 August 1942 | U-564 | Vardaas | Norway | 8,176 | Sunk at 11°35′N 60°40′W |

=== Awards ===
- The Return of Sudetenland Commemorative Medal of 1 October 1938 (20 December 1939)
- Iron Cross (1939)
  - 2nd Class (25 September 1939)
  - 1st Class (25 February 1940)
- U-boat War Badge (1939) (21 December 1939)
  - with Diamonds (1 January 1942)
- War Merit Cross 2nd Class with Swords (30 January 1944)
- Knight's Cross of the Iron Cross with Oak Leaves and Swords
  - Knight's Cross on 3 November 1940 as Oberleutnant zur See and 1st watch officer on U-48
  - 56th Oak Leaves on 31 December 1941 as Oberleutnant zur See and commander of U-564
  - 18th Swords on 1 September 1942 as Kapitänleutnant and commander of U-564

=== Promotions ===
| 25 September 1935: | Seekadett (Midshipman) |
| 1 July 1936: | Fähnrich zur See (Officer Cadet) |
| 1 January 1938: | Oberfähnrich zur See (Senior Ensign) |
| 1 April 1938: | Leutnant zur See (Second Lieutenant) |
| 1 October 1938: | Oberleutnant zur See (First Lieutenant) |
| 1 January 1942: | Kapitänleutnant (Captain Lieutenant) |
| 1 September 1942: | Korvettenkapitän (Corvette Captain) |
| 1 June 1944: | Fregattenkapitän (Frigate Captain) |
