= USS West Ekonk =

Cargo ship in the United States Navy

USS West Ekonk ID-3313
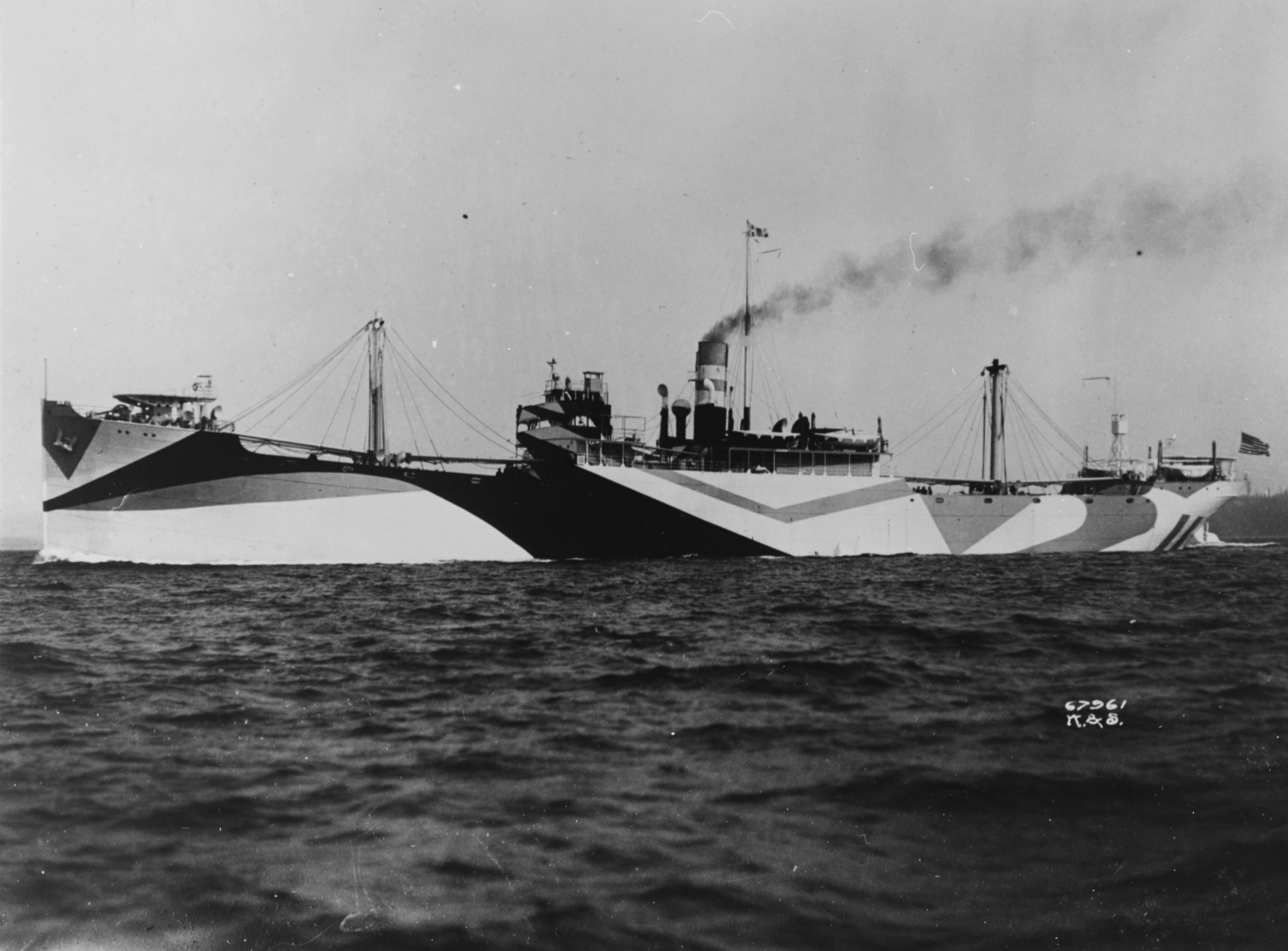
- West Ekonk in dazzle camouflage underway near Seattle in July 1918

History

United States
- Awarded: 15 January 1918
- Builder: Skinner & Eddy; Seattle, Washington
- Cost: $1,776,468
- Yard number: 25 (USSB number 1178)
- Laid down: 16 April 1918
- Launched: 22 June 1918
- Completed: 13 July 1918
- Acquired: 13 July 1918
- Commissioned: 13 July 1918
- Decommissioned: 9 April 1919
- Stricken: 9 April 1919
- Fate: returned to USSB

History
- Name: 1919: West Ekonk; 1940: Empire Wildebeeste
- Owner: 1919: USSB; 1933: Lykes; 1940: Ministry of War Transport
- Port of registry: 1919: United States; 1940: United Kingdom
- Identification: US official number: 216620
- Fate: torpedoed and sunk, 1942

General characteristics
- Type: Design 1013 ship
- Tonnage: 5,630 GRT; 8,800 LT DWT
- Displacement: 12,225 t
- Length: 409 ft 5 in (124.79 m) (LPP); 423 ft 9 in (129.16 m) (LOA)
- Beam: 54 ft 2 in (16.51 m)
- Draft: 24 ft 2.25 in (7.3724 m) (mean)
- Depth of hold: 29 ft 9 in (9.07 m)
- Propulsion: 1 × Curtis geared steam turbine
- Speed: 11.5 knots (21.3 km/h)
- Complement: 107 (as USS West Ekonk)
- Crew: 31 (as SS Empire Wildebeeste)
- Armament: World War I: 1 × 5"/51 caliber (127 mm) gun; 1 × 3"/50 caliber (76 mm) gun

USS West Ekonk (ID-3313) was a cargo ship for the United States Navy during World War I. She was later known as SS West Ekonk in civilian service under American registry, and as SS Empire Wildebeeste under British registry.

West Ekonk was launched for the United States Shipping Board (USSB) in June 1918 as a part of the West ships, a series of steel-hulled cargo ships built on the West Coast of the United States for the World War I war effort. At one point West Ekonk had the distinction of being the ninth fastest-built ocean-going ship in the world. Pressed into cargo service for the US Navy, USS West Ekonk was commissioned into the Naval Overseas Transportation Service (NOTS) and completed three round-trip voyages to Europe for the Navy. After decommissioning in mid 1919, she was briefly in cargo service out of Baltimore and New York before being laid up in Norfolk, Virginia.

West Ekonk was reactivated for cargo service out of Los Angeles in early 1924. By 1926, she was sailing out of New York and called at ports such as Liverpool and Hamburg. In 1933, she was sold to the Lykes Brothers Steamship Company and operated for two of its subsidiary shipping lines through the mid-1930s. In late 1940 she was sold to British interests to help fill the United Kingdom's urgent need for merchant ships.

After sailing to the UK as West Ekonk, the ship was renamed Empire Wildebeeste and sailed in transatlantic convoys, making three round-trips between March 1941 and December 1942. On the westbound leg at the beginning of her fourth round-trip, she straggled behind her convoy and was torpedoed and sunk by German submarine U-106 on 24 January 1942. Nine men died in the attack; the 22 survivors were rescued by American destroyer USS Lang (DD-399) and landed at Bermuda.

== Design and construction ==
The West ships were cargo ships of similar size and design built by several shipyards on the West Coast of the United States for the USSB for emergency use during World War I. All were given names that began with the word West, like West Ekonk, one of some 24 West ships built by Skinner & Eddy of Seattle, Washington. (Note: Skinner & Eddy was an emergency shipyard that only operated from 1916 until about 1920.) West Ekonk (Skinner & Eddy No. 25; USSB No. 1178) was laid down on 16 April 1918. She was launched on 22 June with an elapsed time of 57 working days—67 calendar days—from keel laying to launch. West Ekonk was completed on 13 July, 73 working days after her keel laying, and in a list of the ten fastest-constructed ocean-going ships compiled in 1920 by Edward N. Hurley, the wartime chairman of the USSB, West Ekonk was listed as the ninth fastest-constructed ship in the world.

West Ekonk was the fourth ship built under a USSB contract that called for Skinner & Eddy to deliver 14 ships at a cost of $1,672,000 each, but the cost of extras during her construction added $35,268. Skinner & Eddy received a $69,200 bonus for West Ekonk's early completion, which brought the total cost of the ship to $1,776,468.

West Ekonk was 5,630 gross register tons (GRT), and was 409 feet 5 inches (124.79 m) long (between perpendiculars) and 54 feet 2 inches (16.51 m) abeam. West Ekonk had a steel hull and a deadweight tonnage of 8,800 DWT. The ship had a single steam turbine that drove her single screw propeller which moved the ship at an 11.5-knot (21.3 km/h) pace.

== World War I ==
After her 13 July 1918 completion, West Ekonk was handed over to the United States Navy for use in the NOTS and assigned the identification number 3313. She was commissioned at Seattle, as USS West Ekonk (ID-3313) the same day.

West Ekonk sailed to Port Costa, California, and took on a load of wheat flour and sailed for New York, via the Panama Canal, on 24 July. (Note: Many West ships, to avoid sailing empty to the East Coast, loaded grain products intended for the United Kingdom, France, and Italy, and sailed to Europe without unloading or transferring their cargo, which avoided extra handling of the cargo. The USSB, by prior arrangement, received an equivalent amount of cargo space in foreign ships for other American cargos.) After reaching New York on 27 August, West Ekonk joined a France-bound convoy, departing on 4 September.

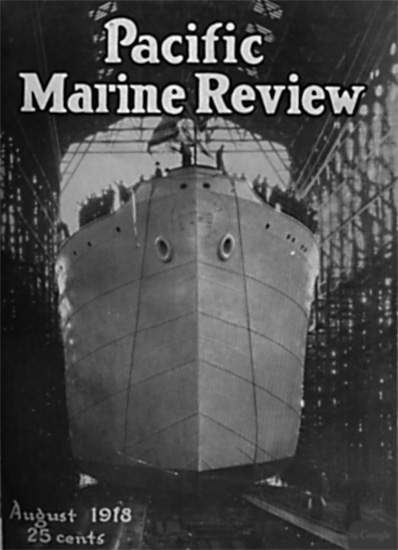
A photograph of the launch of West Ekonk at the Skinner & Eddy shipyard on 22 June 1918 was used as the cover of the August 1918 issue of Pacific Marine Review.

West Ekonk arrived at Brest, France, on 19 September, discharged her cargo, and headed back to New York on 30 September. She took on a load of freight consigned to the Italian government and set out for Genoa in early November. West Ekonk was en route to Italy when the Armistice that ended fighting was signed on 11 November. After completing her trip, she made another cargo run to Genoa, sailing from New York in late January 1919 and returning on 3 April 1919. Six days later West Ekonk was decommissioned and returned to the USSB.

== Interwar career ==
West Ekonk's activities immediately after her return to the USSB in April are not known, but in mid-June The Washington Post reported that West Ekonk would be among the 26 ships allocated to sail out of Baltimore beginning later in the month. In early March 1920, The New York Times reported on West Ekonk's arrival in New York from Liverpool, and in April and June reported on West Ekonk's departure to and arrival from Hamburg.

After being laid up in a reserve fleet in Norfolk, Virginia, some time after mid 1920, West Ekonk was one of two ships reactivated for service out of Los Angeles in early 1924. (Note: The other ship activated for service out of Los Angeles was another West ship, SS West Carnifax.) By early 1926, however, West Ekonk was sailing from Galveston, Texas, to Liverpool, sometimes carrying passengers in addition to freight. In December 1927, West Ekonk's master and chief engineer each received a $50 bonus from the Conservation Committee of the Merchant Fleet Corporation when West Ekonk was named to an honor roll for efficient operation; they were one of 50 duos so honored. On 23 December 1928, West Ekonk was anchored in the River Thames at Gravesend, Kent, United Kingdom when she was struck by the British cargo ship Glynwen and sustained damage to her port bow.

In 1933, West Ekonk was sold to Lykes Brothers Steamship Company and home-ported at Houston, Texas. West Ekonk sailed for the Dixie UK Line, a subsidiary operation of Lykes, for most of 1935, sailing between Galveston and Liverpool. By December 1935, West Ekonk had begun sailing for another subsidiary of Lykes Brothers, the Ripley Steamship Company, and continued sailing on the same Galveston–Liverpool route through September 1937. West Ekonk's activities over the next three years are not recorded.

== World War II ==
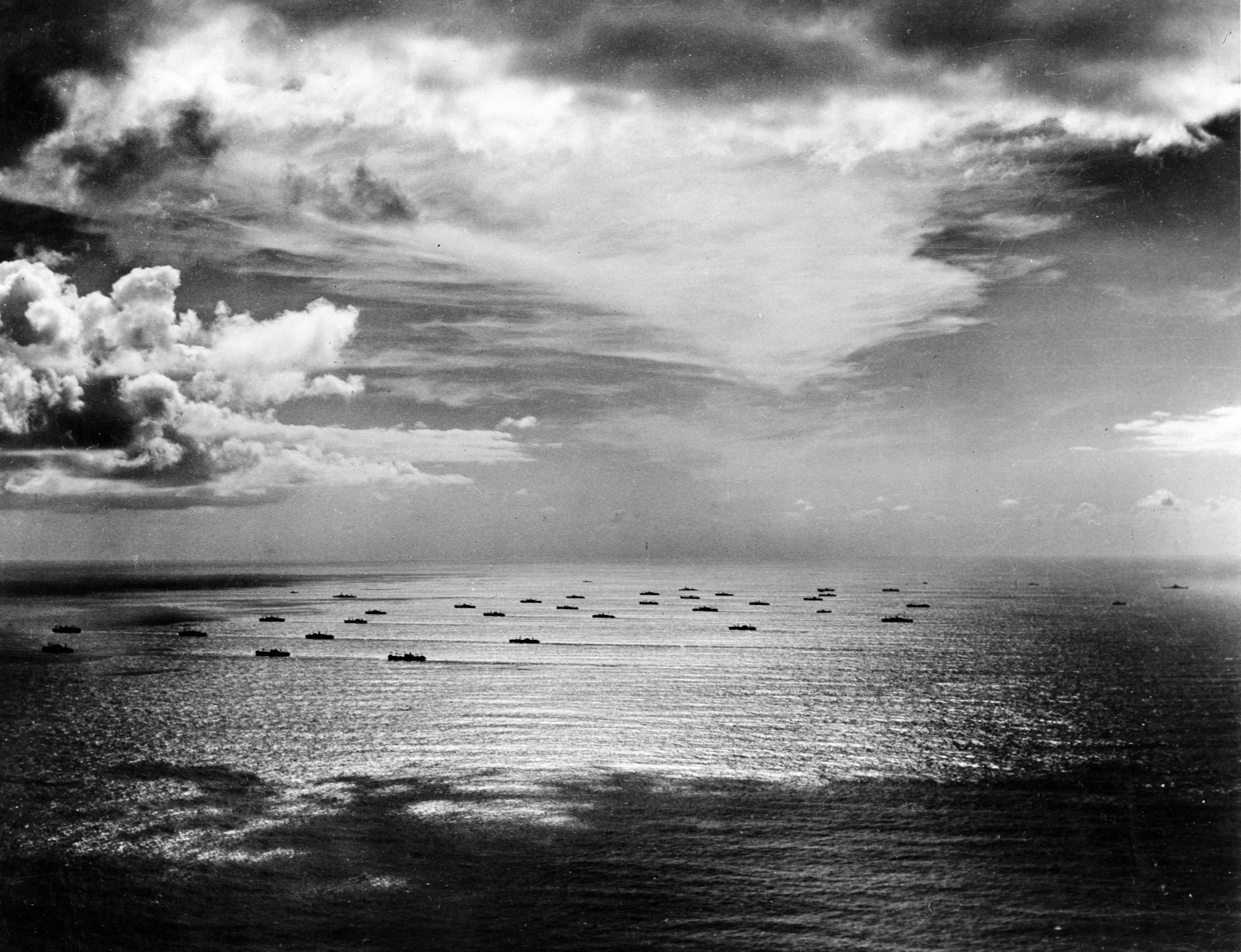
Empire Wildebeeste sailed in several transatlantic convoys, like this typical one seen in 1942, before she was sunk after straying from one in January 1942.

In November 1940, while the United States was still neutral, the United States Maritime Commission (USMC), a successor to the USSB, granted Lykes Brothers permission to sell West Ekonk and five other cargo ships to the British Ministry of War Transport (MoWT). After West Ekonk took on a load of steel and scrap, the ship sailed to Halifax, where she joined convoy HX 99 in sailing for Liverpool on 26 December 1940. On 30 December, the ship's compass went out but West Ekonk was able to remain in her station in the convoy, and safely arrived at Liverpool on 11 January 1941, despite sailing through a gale with sleet storms on 4 January. In his notes for the convoy, P. E. Parker, the convoy's commodore, singled out H. MacKinnon, master of West Ekonk, for praise of his seamanship in keeping West Ekonk in the convoy without a working compass.

After her arrival at Liverpool, West Ekonk was renamed Empire Wildebeeste—MoWT ships taking a name prefixed with "Empire" and joined westbound convoy OB 293 in sailing for the United States on 2 March 1941. The convoy dispersed four days later, and though seven ships were sunk by four German submarines, Empire Wildebeeste safely docked at Baltimore on 24 March. After sailing to Hampton Roads, Virginia, on 1 April and on to Halifax on 6 April, Empire Wildebeeste was scheduled to sail as a part of HX 120 on 10 April, but apparently did not arrive in time. She instead sailed in convoy HX 121 which departed Halifax six days later. Convoy HX 121 was attacked by two U-boats on 28 April and four ships were hit, two ahead of Empire Wildebeeste and two to the starboard. Even though another ship was sunk on 1 May, Empire Wildebeeste successfully delivered her cargo of pig iron to Middlesbrough on 7 May.

After making her way across the Atlantic independently, Empire Wildebeeste arrived at Norfolk, Virginia, on 25 June. After making intermediate stops in Baltimore and Hampton Roads, she sailed for Halifax with a load of scrap iron on 17 July, reaching her destination three days later. She departed in convoy HX 140 on 22 July and arrived at Belfast Lough on 5 August and Newport on 8 August. After arriving at Milford Haven on 25 August, she sailed from there two days later in convoy ON 10 for Halifax, where she arrived on 13 September. From there, Empire Wildebeeste sailed to Montreal and back to Halifax by 5 October. She departed Halifax that same day as a part of convoy HX 153, but had unspecified problems that caused her to drop out and put in at St. John's, Newfoundland, on 11 October. After aborted attempts to sail east in convoys SC 50 and SC 52, Empire Wildebeeste finally reached Loch Ewe on 25 November as a part of convoy SC 54 and Methil on 30 November.

After Empire Wildebeeste made a trip to Hull and back by 23 December, she sailed to Loch Ewe five days later and then departed from Liverpool on 2 January 1942 as a part of convoy ON 53. Empire Wildebeeste strayed behind even before the convoy dispersed on 19 January, and was left to sail on to Baltimore independently. At 06:53 on 24 January, Empire Wildebeeste was struck by a torpedo launched from German submarine U-106 under the command of Kapitänleutnant Hermann Rasch. Empire Wildebeeste went down at position 39°30′N 59°54′W; eight crewmen and one naval gunner were killed during the attack and sinking. American destroyer Lang was dispatched from Bermuda to pick up the master, 18 crewmen, and three gunners, and landed them in Bermuda.

== Bibliography ==
- Crowell, Benedict; Wilson, Robert Forrest (1921). The Road to France: The Transportation of Troops and Military Supplies, 1917–1918. How America Went to War: An Account From Official Sources of the Nation's War Activities, 1917–1920. New Haven: Yale University Press. ISBN 1-143-73956-6. OCLC 18696066.
- Hurley, Edward N. (1920). The New Merchant Marine. New York: Century. OCLC 751444.
- —— (1927). The Bridge to France. Philadelphia: J.B. Lippincott. OCLC 1348068.
- Silverstone, Paul H. (2006). The New Navy, 1883-1922. New York: Routledge. ISBN 978-0-415-97871-2. OCLC 63171106.
- United States House of Representatives, Select Committee on U. S. Shipping Board Operations (1920). Shipping Board Operations. Washington, DC: Government Printing Office. OCLC 64558341.
