= SS Carsbreck =

British cargo steamship sunk during World War II

Coordinates: 36°20′N 10°50′W

History
- Name: Coulbeg (1936–1938); Carsbreck (1938–1941)
- Owner: Dornoch Shipping Co Ltd (1936–1938); Carslogie SS Co (1938–1941)
- Operator: Lambert Bros Ltd (1936–1938); Honeyman & Co, Glasgow (1938–1941)
- Builder: Ayrshire Dockyard Co Ltd, Irvine
- Yard number: 518
- Launched: 20 August 1936
- Completed: September 1936
- Renamed: Launched as Coulbeg; Renamed Carsbreck in 1938
- Fate: Sunk 24 October 1941

General characteristics
- Type: cargo steamship
- Tonnage: 3,670 GRT; 6,300 DWT
- Length: 352.6 ft (107.5 m) p/p
- Beam: 50.2 ft (15.3 m)
- Draught: 21 ft 11 1/2 in (6.69 m)
- Depth: 23.8 ft (7.3 m)
- Installed power: 346 NHP
- Propulsion: triple expansion steam engine, single screw
- Speed: 10 knots (19 km/h)
- Crew: 42

SS Carsbreck was a British cargo steamship. She was sunk while carrying supplies to the UK in the Second World War.

== Early years and convoy SC 7 ==
Ayrshire Dockyard Co Ltd, Irvine, North Ayrshire built the ship, completing her in September 1936 as Coulbeg. Her first owner was Dornoch Shipping Co Ltd, which registered her in Glasgow and contracted Lambert Bros Ltd to manage her. In 1938 the Carslogie Steam Ship Co bought her, renamed her Carsbreck and contracted Honeyman and Company of Glasgow to manage her. She sailed in a number of convoys in the Second World War, carrying supplies to and from the UK. She was part of Convoy SC 7 in October 1940, carrying a cargo of timber. The convoy was overwhelmed by a wolfpack of U-boats, and at 0204 hours on 18 October U-38, commanded by Heinrich Liebe, torpedoed and badly damaged Carsbreck. She was able to reach port, escorted by the Flower-class corvette HMS Heartsease.

== Convoy HG 75 and sinking ==
Carsbreck later formed part of Convoy HG 75 from Almería to Barrow-in-Furness. She carried a cargo of 6,000 tons of iron ore. At 0636 hours on 24 October 1941 Reinhard Suhren's U-564 sighted the convoy and fired five torpedoes at it. Three ships were hit, and all three sank: Alhama, Ariosto and Carsbreck. Twenty-four of the Carsbreck's complement were killed: 19 crewmen, four DEMS gunners and the master. 16 crew members and two DEMS gunners survived and were rescued by the Free French Élan-class aviso Commandant Duboc. They were transferred to the CAM ship Ariguani. Two days later U-83 torpedoed and damaged Ariguani. She was abandoned, but later was re-boarded and towed to Gibraltar. The Flower-class corvette HMS Campion picked up Carsbreck's survivors and transferred them to the V-class destroyer HMS Vidette, which took them to Gibraltar.
