= Arnt J. Mørland =

Norwegian politician (1888–1957)

Member of the Parliament of Norway from Vest-Agder
- In office 1953–1957

Personal details
- Born: 23 June 1888 Arendal
- Died: 28 September 1957 (aged 69)
- Party: Christian Democratic Party
- Spouse: Constance Thomsen
- Relations: Reidar Kobro (son-in-law)
- Children: Arnt J. C. Mørland; Berit Mørland
- Occupation: Ship-owner

Arnt Jacobsen Mørland (23 June 1888 – 28 September 1957) was a Norwegian ship-owner, resistance member, and politician for the Christian Democratic Party.

== Personal life ==
He was born in Arendal as a son of merchant Jens Mørland (1853–1936) and Sophie Jacobsen (1855–1945). Together with Constance Thomsen he had the son Arnt J. C. Mørland. A daughter, Berit Mørland, married dean Reidar Kobro.

== Career ==
Mørland finished middle school in 1903. From 1903 to 1916 he worked in the ship-owner company Chr. Th. Boe and the shipbroker company Lund & Co. He started his own ship-owner company in 1916, named Agdesidens Rederi. He later started more companies; Mørland Rederi in 1927 and Mørland Tankrederi in 1930. During the occupation of Norway by Nazi Germany he was arrested on 24 February 1944, and was incarcerated in Arkivet until 4 July, then in Grini concentration camp to 4 February 1945. He then spent the rest of the war years in Berg concentration camp.

Among his ships, MT Vardaas was hit by a torpedo from the German submarine U-564 on 30 August 1942, while carrying dead freight from Cape Town to Trinidad, but all 41 crew members were saved. His ship MS Ravnaas was sunk by Japanese aircraft 250 nmi east of the Samar Island in the morning of 8 December 1941, about the same time as the Attack on Pearl Harbor. All 28 crew members reached the island of Mindanao after three days in lifeboats. Most of them were later imprisoned in Japanese camps.

Mørland chaired the regional ship-owners' association Aust-Agder rederforening from 1922 to 1940 and 1946 to 1949, and was a board member of the Norwegian Shipowners' Association from 1928 to 1957. He was a board member of Arendal Elektrisitetsverk from 1937 to 1942 and 1945 to 1951, of several local insurance trusts, and a supervisory council member of Agder Bank. He was a vice consul for Sweden from 1946 to 1953, and was decorated as a Knight of the Order of Vasa in 1953. In 1957 he became a Knight, First Class of the Order of St. Olav.

He was an adherent of the Oxford Group, and was very active in the religious life of Arendal, both in the church, the inner mission and Sunday schools. He was the vice chairman of the Diocesan Council of Agder from 1934 to 1950.

He was a member of the executive committee of Arendal city council from 1919 to 1925, 1931 to 1937 and 1945 to 1947. In 1953 he was elected to the Parliament of Norway from Vest-Agder. He died before the end of his term and was replaced by Thor Martin Nilsen Sauvik.
