= Mexican declaration of war on Germany, Italy, and Japan =

1942 event of World War II

Mexico formally declared war on the Axis powers in support of the Allies on May 22, 1942, following losses of oil ships in the Gulf of Mexico, most notably the Potrero del Llano and the Faja de Oro, to German submarine attacks. After its declaration of war, Mexico was active in convincing other Latin American states to support the allies.

== Text of the declaration ==
THE CONGRESS OF THE UNITED MEXICAN STATES DECREES:

ARTICLE I. It is declared that as of May 22, 1942, there exists a state of war between the United Mexican States and Germany, Italy and Japan.

ARTICLE II. The President of the Republic will make the appropriate declaration and the international notifications that may be in order.

TRANSITORY ARTICLES

ARTICLE I. This law will enter into effect on the date of its publication in the Official Diary of the Republic.

ARTICLE II. This law will solemnly be made known throughout the Republic.

In compliance with Section I, of Article 89, of The Political Constitution of the United Mexican States, and for its publication and observance, I issue this Decree at the residence of the Federal Executive Power, in the City of Mexico, Federal District, on the 1st day of June 1942.

(sgd.) Manuel Avila Camacho

== See also ==
- Declarations of war during World War II
- Diplomatic history of World War II
- Latin America during World War II
