= German submarine U-106 (1940) =

German World War II submarine

- A Type IXB submarine, believed to be U-106, under attack by a Sunderland flying boat

History

Nazi Germany
- Name: U-106
- Ordered: 24 May 1938
- Builder: DeSchiMAG AG Weser, Bremen
- Yard number: 969
- Laid down: 26 November 1939
- Launched: 17 June 1940
- Commissioned: 24 September 1940
- Home port: Lorient, France
- Fate: Sunk, 2 August 1943, northwest of Spain, by British and Australian aircraft

General characteristics
- Class & type: Type IXB submarine
- Displacement: 1,051 t (1,034 long tons) surfaced; 1,178 t (1,159 long tons) submerged
- Length: 76.50 m (251 ft) o/a; 58.75 m (192 ft 9 in) pressure hull
- Beam: 6.76 m (22 ft 2 in) o/a; 4.40 m (14 ft 5 in) pressure hull
- Draught: 4.70 m (15 ft 5 in)
- Speed: 18.2 knots (33.7 km/h; 20.9 mph) surfaced; 7.3 knots (13.5 km/h; 8.4 mph) submerged
- Range: 12,000 nmi (22,000 km; 14,000 mi) at 10 knots (19 km/h; 12 mph) surfaced; 64 nmi (119 km; 74 mi) at 4 knots (7.4 km/h; 4.6 mph) submerged
- Armament: 6 × torpedo tubes (4 bow, 2 stern); 22 × 53.3 cm (21 in) torpedoes; 1 × 10.5 cm SK C/32 naval gun (180 rounds); 1 × 3.7 cm (1.5 in) SK C/30 AA gun; 1 × 2 cm FlaK 30 AA guns

Service record
- Part of: 2nd U-boat Flotilla; 24 September 1940 – 2 August 1943
- Identification codes: M 34 486
- Commanders: Kptlt. Jürgen Oesten; 24 September 1940 – 19 October 1941; Kptlt. Hermann Rasch; 20 October 1941 – April 1943; Oblt.z.S. Wolf-Dietrich Damerow; 20 June – 2 August 1943
- Operations: 10 patrols: 1st patrol: 4 January – 10 February 1941; 2nd patrol: 26 February – 17 June 1941; 3rd patrol: 11 August – 11 September 1941; 4th patrol: 21 October – 22 November 1941; 5th patrol: 3 January – 22 February 1942; 6th patrol: 15 April – 29 June 1942; 7th patrol: 25 – 29 July 1942; 8th patrol: 22 September – 26 December 1942; 9th patrol: 17 February – 4 April 1943; 10th patrol: 28 July – 2 August 1943
- Victories: 22 merchant ships sunk (138,581 GRT); 2 merchant ships damaged (12,634 GRT); 1 warship damaged (31,100 tons); 1 auxiliary warship damaged (8,246 GRT)

German submarine U-106 was a Type IXB U-boat of Nazi Germany's Kriegsmarine that operated during World War II. She was laid down on 26 November 1939 at DeSchiMAG AG Weser in Bremen as yard number 969, launched on 17 June 1940 and commissioned on 24 September. She was armed with six torpedo tubes and a 10.5 cm SK C/32 naval gun. U-106 was assigned to the 2nd U-boat Flotilla on 24 September 1940, in which she would serve for nearly three years.

U-106 was one of the most successful German submarines of World War II. She completed 10 wartime patrols and sank 22 ships totalling 138,581 gross register tons (GRT). She also damaged two ships totalling 12,634 GRT, one auxiliary warship of 8,246 GRT and the battleship HMS Malaya. U-106 helped to catalyze Mexico's entry into World War II on the side of the Allies by sinking one of two oil tankers; the Faja de Oro. (The other was the Potrero del Llano, sunk by U-564).

== Design ==
Type IXB submarines were slightly larger than the original Type IX submarines, later designated IXA. U-106 had a displacement of 1,051 tonnes (1,034 long tons) when at the surface and 1,178 tonnes (1,159 long tons) while submerged. The U-boat had a total length of 76.50 m (251 ft), a pressure hull length of 58.75 m (192 ft 9 in), a beam of 6.76 m (22 ft 2 in), a height of 9.60 m (31 ft 6 in), and a draught of 4.70 m (15 ft 5 in). The submarine was powered by two MAN M 9 V 40/46 supercharged four-stroke, nine-cylinder diesel engines producing a total of 4,400 metric horsepower (3,240 kW; 4,340 shp) for use while surfaced, two Siemens-Schuckert 2 GU 345/34 double-acting electric motors producing a total of 1,000 metric horsepower (740 kW; 990 shp) for use while submerged. She had two shafts and two 1.92 m (6 ft) propellers. The boat was capable of operating at depths of up to 230 metres (750 ft).

The submarine had a maximum surface speed of 18.2 knots (33.7 km/h; 20.9 mph) and a maximum submerged speed of 7.3 knots (13.5 km/h; 8.4 mph). When submerged, the boat could operate for 64 nautical miles (119 km; 74 mi) at 4 knots (7.4 km/h; 4.6 mph); when surfaced, she could travel 12,000 nautical miles (22,000 km; 14,000 mi) at 10 knots (19 km/h; 12 mph). U-106 was fitted with six 53.3 cm (21 in) torpedo tubes (four fitted at the bow and two at the stern), 22 torpedoes, one 10.5 cm (4.13 in) SK C/32 naval gun, 180 rounds, and a 3.7 cm (1.5 in) SK C/30 as well as a 2 cm (0.79 in) C/30 anti-aircraft gun. The boat had a complement of forty-eight.

== Service history ==
=== 1st patrol ===
U-106 departed Kiel for her first patrol on 4 January 1941 which was to be conducted in the Atlantic Ocean. Her route included negotiating the gap between the Faroe and Shetland Islands. She sailed north-west of Rockall and sank two ships: Zealandic on the 17th and Sesostris on the 29th. There were no survivors from either vessel.

The boat docked in Lorient in occupied France on 10 February.

=== 2nd patrol ===
For her second patrol, U-106 departed Lorient on 26 February 1941. She would not return to France until 17 June 112 days later. The boat headed for the coast of west Africa. Her first victim on this patrol was Memnon, which went to the bottom 200 nmi (370 km; 230 mi) west of Cape Blanco, French West Africa on 11 March. She sank seven more ships and damaged two others, including the battleship HMS Malaya in the vicinity of Senegal and the Cape Verde Islands. One of the seven, Eastlea, had her back broken and sank within ten minutes.

=== 3rd patrol ===
Sortie number three and the U-boat failed to find any targets. She had left Lorient on 11 August 1941 and returned there a month later (on 11 September), having covered the ocean west of Ireland, also west of the Azores and from north of that island chain to the Portuguese mainland.

On 2 Sept., the submarine met the German freighter Anneliese Essberger at 37 degrees 55 minutes N and 37 degrees 24 minutes W. She then escorted the freighter until 8 Sept., when they reached western cape of the Spanish north coast. The freighter then continued onwards to Bordeaux.

=== 4th patrol ===
Any success on the boat's fourth sally was marred on 23 October 1941 by the discovery that an entire watch, (four men), had been washed overboard in heavy seas on the western edge of the Bay of Biscay. U-106 sank one ship, King Malcolm on the 28th and damaged one other, USS Salinas, on the 30th. She was then hunted for nine hours and seriously damaged by the escort vessels of convoy ON 28.

=== 5th patrol ===
For her fifth patrol, U-106 sailed along the eastern coast of the United States and sank five ships, during the so-called "Second Happy Time". Amongst them were the SS Empire Wildebeeste and the tanker SS Rochester, the latter ship being dispatched with her 10.5 cm deck gun. She had left Lorient on 3 January 1942 and returned on 22 February.

=== 6th patrol ===
Patrol number six also benefitted from a change of operational area to the Gulf of Mexico, where the boat sank five more ships and damaged a sixth. One of them, the tanker Faja de Oro, on 21 May 1942, was the second ship to be sunk which helped to facilitate Mexico's declaration of war on Germany on 1 June.

=== 7th and 8th patrols ===
U-106 was attacked by a Vickers Wellington of No. 311 Squadron RAF in the Bay of Biscay on 27 July 1942. The first watch officer (1WO) was killed; the commander was wounded, forcing the boat to put about, returning to Lorient on the 29th, just five days after setting out.

The submarine crossed the Atlantic once more, sinking Waterton in the Gulf of St. Lawrence on 11 October 1942.

=== 9th patrol ===
This foray was comparatively uneventful, starting on 17 February 1943 and finishing on 4 April. No ships were attacked.

=== 10th patrol ===
The U-boat's 10th and final patrol began on 28 July 1943; she was sunk on 2 August of that year off northern Spain, after being damaged by a Wellington of No. 407 Squadron RCAF.

=== Fate ===
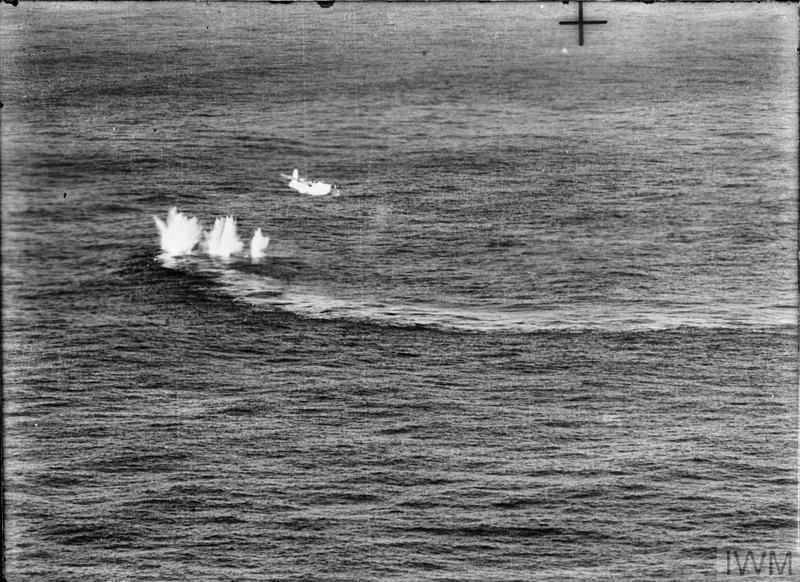
U-106 under attack

While trying to join a fleet of E-boats (German surface torpedo boats), U-106 was spotted by a Sunderland flying boat of 228 Squadron flown by Flying Officer Reader Hanbury. Although the anti-aircraft guns on U-106 fended off the British flying boat that sighted it, U-106 was hit by a Sunderland from No. 461 Squadron RAAF flown by Flight Lieutenant A. F. Clarke.

According to the Allied crews and photographs taken of the attack, the U-boat partially exploded before sinking vertically. Of U-106's 48-man crew, 22 were killed. The 26 who survived the attack were later picked up by German E-boats.

=== Wolfpacks ===
U-106 took part in three wolfpacks, namely:

- Raubritter (1 – 15 November 1941)
- Westwall (1 – 16 December 1942)
- Unverzagt (12 – 22 March 1943)

== Summary of raiding history ==
Date	Ship	Nationality	Tonnage (Note: Merchant ship tonnages are in gross register tons. Military vessels are listed by tons displacement.)	Convoy	Fate	Location	Deaths
17 January 1941	Zealandic	United Kingdom	10,578		Sunk	58°28′N 20°43′W	73
29 January 1941	Sesostris	Egypt	2,962	SC-19	Sunk	56°00′N 15°23′W	Unknown
11 March 1941	Memnon	United Kingdom	7,506		Sunk	20°41′N 21°00′W	5
16 March 1941	Almkerk	Netherlands	6,810		Sunk	13°21′N 20°25′W	0
17 March 1941	Andalusian	United Kingdom	3,082	SL-68	Sunk	14°33′N 21°06′W	0
17 March 1941	Tapanoeli	Netherlands	7,034	SL-68	Sunk	15°56′N 20°49′W	0
20 March 1941	HMS Malaya	Royal Navy	31,100	SL-68	Damaged	20°02′N 25°50′W	Unknown
20 March 1941	Meekerk	Netherlands	7,995	SL-68	Damaged	20°00′N 26°00′W	Unknown
24 March 1941	Eastlea	United Kingdom	4,267		Sunk	16°18′N 22°05′W	37
30 May 1941	Silveryew	United Kingdom	6,373		Sunk	16°42′N 25°29′W	1
31 May 1941	Clan Macdougall	United Kingdom	6,843		Sunk	16°50′N 25°10′W	2
6 June 1941	Sacramento Valley	United Kingdom	4,573	OB-324	Sunk	17°10′N 30°10′W	3
28 October 1941	King Malcolm	United Kingdom	5,120	SC-50	Sunk	51°28′N 28°30′W	38
30 October 1941	USS Salinas	United States Navy	8,246	ON 28	Damaged	46°56′N 37°46′W	Unknown
24 January 1942	Empire Wildebeeste	United Kingdom	5,631	ON 53	Sunk	39°30′N 59°54′W	9
26 January 1942	Traveller	United Kingdom	3,963		Sunk	40°00′N 61°45′W	52
30 January 1942	Rochester	United States	6,836		Sunk	37°10′N 73°58′W	4
3 February 1942	Amerikaland	Sweden	15,355		Sunk	36°36′N 74°10′W	5
6 February 1942	Opawa	United Kingdom	10,354		Sunk	38°21′N 61°13′W	56
5 May 1942	Lady Drake	Canada	7,985		Sunk	35°43′N 64°43′W	12
21 May 1942	SS Faja de Oro	Mexico	6,067		Sunk	23°30′N 84°24′W	10
26 May 1942	Carrabulle	United States	5,030		Sunk	26°18′N 89°21′W	22
27 May 1942	Atenas	United States	4,639		Damaged	25°50′N 89°05′W	0
28 May 1942	Mentor	United Kingdom	7,383		Sunk	24°11′N 87°02′W	4
1 June 1942	Hampton Roads	United States	2,689		Sunk	22°45′N 85°13′W	5
11 October 1942	Waterton	United Kingdom	2,140	BS-31	Sunk	47°07′N 59°54′W	0

== Bibliography ==
- Bishop, C. Kriegsmarine U-Boats, 1939–45. Amber Books, 2006.
- Bowyer, Chaz. Coastal Command at War. Ian Allan. 1979, ISBN 0-7110-0980-5
- Busch, Rainer; Röll, Hans-Joachim (1999). German U-boat commanders of World War II : a biographical dictionary. Translated by Brooks, Geoffrey. London, Annapolis, Md: Greenhill Books, Naval Institute Press. ISBN 1-55750-186-6.
- Busch, Rainer; Röll, Hans-Joachim (1999). Deutsche U-Boot-Verluste von September 1939 bis Mai 1945 [German U-boat losses from September 1939 to May 1945]. Der U-Boot-Krieg (in German). Vol. IV. Hamburg, Berlin, Bonn: Mittler. ISBN 3-8132-0514-2.
- Evans, J. The Sunderland: Flying Boat Queen Paterchurch Publications, 2004 ISBN 1-870745-13-2
- Gröner, Erich; Jung, Dieter; Maass, Martin (1991). German Warships 1815–1945, U-boats and Mine Warfare Vessels. Vol. 2. Translated by Thomas, Keith; Magowan, Rachel. London: Conway Maritime Press. ISBN 0-85177-593-4.
- Kemp, Paul (1999). U-Boats Destroyed – German Submarine Losses in the World Wars. London: Arms & Armour. ISBN 1-85409-515-3.
