= List of ships named Rochester =

Rochester is the name of the following ships:

== Steamships ==
- Rochester (1853), a passenger-cargo paddle steamer built by Caird & Company for Royal Mail Lines as Atrato
- Rochester (1880), a cargo ship built by Union Dry Dock Company, and lost by fire in 1912 as Sydney C. Mclouth
- Rochester (1898), a British fishing trawler built by Mackie & Thomson, Govan, requisitioned in World War I, and sunk by a German mine on 27 July 1944
- Rochester (1907), a cargo ship built by the Great Lakes Engineering Works for service on the Great Lakes
- Rochester (1910), a passenger ship built by the Detroit Shipbuilding Company for service on the Great Lakes
- Rochester (1912), a cargo ship built by the Great Lakes Engineering Works as Yaguez, and sunk on 2 November 1917 by a submarine torpedo
- Rochester (1920), an oil tanker built by the Bethlehem Shipbuilding Corporation at Sparrows Point, Maryland and sunk on 30 January 1942 by the deck gun of U-106.

== Naval ships ==
- HMS Rochester, a number of ships of the United Kingdom's Royal Navy
- USS Rochester, a number of ships of the United States Navy
