= SS Thistlegarth =

British merchant ship (1929–1940)

History
- Name: Thistlegarth
- Owner: Allan, Black & Co. - Albyn Line
- Port of registry: Sunderland, United Kingdom
- Builder: James Laing & Sons Ltd.
- Yard number: 706
- Launched: 9 July 1929
- Completed: September 1929
- Acquired: September 1929
- Maiden voyage: September 1929
- In service: September 1929
- Identification: Official number: 160314; GTCQ
- Fate: Torpedoed and sunk 15 October 1940

General characteristics
- Type: Cargo ship
- Tonnage: 4,747 GRT
- Length: 128.32 m (421 ft 0 in)
- Beam: 17.07 m (56 ft 0 in)
- Depth: 7.32 m (24 ft 0 in)
- Installed power: 1 x 3 cyl. triple expansion engine, 2 single boilers, 1 auxiliary boiler, 8 corrugated furnaces
- Propulsion: Screw propeller
- Speed: 10 knots (19 km/h; 12 mph)
- Capacity: 39
- Crew: 38

SS Thistlegarth was a British armed merchant cargo ship that the German submarine U-103 torpedoed and sunk in the Atlantic Ocean 45 nautical miles (83 km; 52 mi) west-northwest of Rockall while she was travelling in Convoy OB 228 from Scapa Flow, Orkney Islands, Scotland, United Kingdom to Father Point, New Brunswick, Canada in ballast.

== Construction ==
Thistlegarth was built by the James Laing & Sons Ltd. shipyard at Sunderland, United Kingdom. She was launched in July and completed in September 1929. The ship was 128.32 metres (421 ft 0 in) long, had a beam of 17.07 metres (56 ft 0 in) and had a depth of 7.32 metres (24 ft 0 in). She was assessed at 4,747 gross register tons (GRT) and had one 3-cylinder triple expansion engine along with two single boilers, one auxiliary boiler and eight corrugated furnaces driving a single screw propeller. The ship could generate 430 nhp and could reach a speed of 10 knots (19 km/h; 12 mph).

== Sinking ==
Thistlegarth was travelling from Scapa Flow, Orkney Islands, Scotland, United Kingdom to Father Point, New Brunswick, Canada in ballast as part of Convoy OB 228 when on 15 October 1940 at 19.33pm, the unescorted ship was hit amidships on her port side by a G7e torpedo from the German submarine U-103 in the Atlantic Ocean 45 nautical miles (83 km; 52 mi) west-northwest of Rockall. The ship took on a noticeable list and the crew abandoned ship, but reboarded her later when they noticed that Thistlegarth did not appear to be sinking. The ship's lingering buoyancy also caught the attention of the crew of U-103, who decided to surface and fired the deck gun at the damaged ship. Not realising the Thistlegarth was armed with guns of her own, U-103 had to crash dive after firing only three shots due to their target returning fire at them.

Victory remained short, as Thistlegarth was hit by a coup de grâce under the aft mast on her starboard side at 9.42pm, which broke her in two and sank her in two minutes. The crew had all safely evacuated into two lifeboats and awaited rescue. The first lifeboat with nine crew members on board were rescued by HMS Heartsease on 18 October, but the second lifeboat containing 28 crew members, the captain and a gunner was never seen again and all were presumed lost at sea.

== Wreck ==
The wreck of Thistlegarth lies at 58°43′N 15°00′W.
