= SS Carrabulle =

Ocean cargo liner after WW I

History

United States
- Name: Carrabulle
- Owner: United States Shipping Board (1920); American Fuel & Transportion Company (1920); United States Shipping Board (1921–1922); Curtis Bay Copper & Iron Works (1922–1923); Cuban Distilling Company (1923–1942)
- Builder: American International Shipbuilding Corporation, Philadelphia
- Yard number: 1530
- Launched: 16 June 1920
- Completed: September 1920
- Homeport: Baltimore, Maryland
- Identification: US Official Number 220597; code letters: MBKR
- Fate: Sunk, 26 May 1942

General characteristics
- Type: Design 1022 cargo ship
- Tonnage: 5,030 GRT; 3,105 NRT; 7,500 DWT
- Length: 390.0 ft (118.9 m)
- Beam: 54.2 ft (16.5 m)
- Depth: 27.8 ft (8.5 m)
- Installed power: Oil-fired steam turbines, 2500 ihp
- Propulsion: Single screw
- Speed: 11.5 knots
- Range: 9,000 miles
- Capacity: 344,963 gallons

SS Carrabulle was a Design 1022 cargo ship built for the United States Shipping Board immediately after World War I.

== History ==
She was laid down at yard number 1530 at the Philadelphia, Pennsylvania shipyard of the American International Shipbuilding Corporation, one of 110 Design 1022 cargo ships built for the United States Shipping Board. She was completed in 1920 and named Carrabulle. In 1920, she was purchased by the American Fuel & Transportation Company and converted into a tanker by the Globe Shipbuilding Company in Baltimore with a 344,963 gallon capacity. In 1921, she was returned to the USSB. In 1922, she was purchased by the Curtis Bay Copper & Iron Works (Baltimore, Maryland). In 1923, she was purchased by the Cuban Distilling Company where she was utilized to transport blackstrap molasses, a byproduct of sugar refining, to the United States where it would be used to produce cattle feed, vinegar and denatured alcohol (in high demand due to Prohibition).

On May 26, 1942, she was torpedoed and sunk by German submarine U-106 in the Gulf of Mexico (26°18′N 89°21′W). 22 men were killed and 18 were rescued by the US Type C1-B freighter Thompson Lykes.

== Bibliography ==
- McKellar, Norman L. "Steel Shipbuilding under the U. S. Shipping Board, 1917-1921, Part II, Contract Steel Ships, p. 588" (PDF). Steel Shipbuilding under the U. S. Shipping Board, 1917-1921. ShipScribe.
- Marine Review (1921). "1920 Construction Record of U.S. Yards -Carrabulle". The Marine Review. 51 (February). New York: 17 and 97.
