= SS Faja de Oro =

Coordinates: 23°30′N 84°24′W

History

Mexico
- Name: Barneson (1914–1915); Oyleric (1915–1937); Genoano (1937–1941); Faja de Oro (1941–1942)
- Owner: Bank Line Ltd (Andrew Weir & Co), Glasgow (1914–1915); Andrew Weir & Co, Glasgow (1915–1937); Ditta G.M. Barbagelata, Genoa (1937–1941); Petróleos Mexicanos (Pemex), Tampico (1941–1942)
- Port of registry: (Mexico) Tampico (1941–1942)
- Builder: R. W. Hawthorn Leslie & Company, Hebburn-on-Tyne
- Yard number: 462
- Launched: 23 December 1913
- Completed: February 1914
- Fate: Torpedoed and sunk on 21 May 1942

General characteristics
- Type: Steam tanker
- Tonnage: 6,067 GRT
- Length: 433 ft 5 in (132.1 m)
- Beam: 54 ft 6 in (16.6 m)
- Draught: 32 ft 4 in (9.9 m)
- Propulsion: 536 nhp; triple-expansion engine

SS Faja de Oro ("Strip of Gold", which is a petroleum rich area in Mexico) was an oil tanker built in 1914. It sailed for a number of companies, and survived service in the First World War, only to be torpedoed and sunk by a German submarine during the Second World War while sailing under the Mexican flag in the Gulf of Mexico. Its sinking contributed to Mexico's decision to enter the war on the side of the Allies.

Faja de Oro was originally built by R. W. Hawthorn Leslie & Company, Hebburn-on-Tyne as Barneson, for service with Bank Line Ltd (Andrew Weir & Co), of Glasgow. It was taken over by Andrew Weir & Co in 1915 and renamed Oyleric. It was sold in 1937 to the Italian company Ditta G.M. Barbagelata, of Genoa, and was renamed Genoano. it was seized by the Mexican government while docked at Tampico, Tamaulipas, on 8 December 1941 and renamed Faja de Oro. It was operated by Petróleos Mexicanos (Pemex), and was homeported in Tampico.

Faja de Oro was sailing unescorted from Marcus Hook, Pennsylvania, back to Tampico in May 1942 under the command of dec. Alm Gustavo Martinez Trejo. It was not carrying any cargo, and was sailing in ballast. It was sighted by the U-106, under Kapitänleutnant Hermann Rasch, and was torpedoed at 04.21 hours on 21 May 1942, while off Key West. The attack was made despite Mexican neutrality, presumably because the ship's nationality had been indiscernible in the dark. Faja de Oro was hit in the foreship by one of two torpedoes. U-106 then fired a coup de grâce at 04.33 hours, which missed. A second was fired 20 minutes later, hitting it amidships and setting it on fire. It sank shortly afterwards with the loss of 10 of its crew. 27 survivors were later rescued. The attack had been observed by another German submarine, U-753, which had also chased Faja de Oro, but on noticing U-106, had not attempted an attack.

The sinking of Faja de Oro, coming as it did a week after the sinking of the Mexican tanker SS Potrero del Llano on 14 May by Reinhard Suhren's U-564 contributed to Mexico's declaration of war on Germany on 1 June 1942.
