= USS Lydia (ID-3524) =

Cargo steamship that served in both World Wars

History
- Name: 1902: Széll Kálmán; 1918: Lydia; 1924: Manzoni
- Namesake: 1902: Kálmán Széll
- Owner: 1902: "Adria" Royal Hungarian Sea Nav Co, Ltd; 1917: USSB; 1919: Lydia SS Co, Inc; 1923: Susquehanna Line, Inc; 1924: Adria SA di Nav Mar; 1937: "Tirrenia" SA di Nav
- Operator: 1918: US Navy; 1919: F Auditore
- Port of registry: 1902: (Austria-Hungary) Fiume; 1918: (United States) New York; 1919: (United States) Baltimore; 1924: (Kingdom of Italy) Fiume
- Builder: Wigham Richardson & Co, Low Walker
- Cost: £70,903
- Yard number: 383
- Launched: 29 January 1902
- Completed: 24 March 1902
- Acquired: for US Navy, 23 October 1918
- Commissioned: into US Navy, 26 October 1918
- Decommissioned: from US Navy, 15 May 1919
- Identification: 1902: code letters JSDR; by 1918: code letters LKQF; 1918: Naval Registry ID-3524; by 1919: US official number 217022; by 1926: code letters NXEQ; by 1934: call sign IBFU
- Fate: sunk, 5 July 1940; raised & scrapped

General characteristics
- Type: cargo steamship
- Tonnage: 3,900 GRT, 2,432 NRT, 5,976 DWT
- Length: 366.0 ft (111.6 m)
- Beam: 48.2 ft (14.7 m)
- Draft: 23 ft (7.0 m)
- Depth: 17.8 ft (5.4 m)
- Decks: 1
- Installed power: 1 × triple-expansion engine, 1,500 ihp, 361 NHP
- Propulsion: 1 × screw
- Speed: 10 1/2 knots (19 km/h)
- Complement: in US Navy: 88
- Sensors & processing systems: by 1922: submarine signalling; by 1935: wireless direction finding
- Notes: sister ships: Arad, Báró Fejérváry

Note: This ship should not be confused with the first USS Lydia (SP-62), which was in commission during an overlapping period.

The second USS Lydia (ID-3524) was a cargo steamship. She was launched in England in 1902 as Széll Kálmán for an Austro-Hungarian shipping company. Brazil interned her when the First World War began in 1914, and seized her in 1917. By mid-1918, the United States Shipping Board (USSB) had acquired her from the Brazilian government. Later in 1918, the United States Navy requisitioned her, and commissioned her as USS Lydia. In 1919, she was decommissioned and returned to the USSB, who sold her later that year. She was in US merchant service until 1924, when an Italian shipowner bought her and renamed her Manzoni. In the Second World War, a Royal Navy biplane sank her by torpedo at Tobruk. British salvors later raised and scrapped her.

== Three sister ships ==
In 1901 and 1902, Wigham Richardson & Co, Ltd, built three sister ships for the "Adria" Royal Hungarian Sea Navigation Co, Ltd. Yard number 381 was launched on 30 September 1901 as Arad, and completed that November. Yard number 383 was launched on 29 January 1902 as Széll Kálmán, after the Hungarian statesman Kálmán Széll, and was completed on 24 March. Yard number 390 was launched on 9 May 1902 as Báró Fejérváry, and completed that June.

Széll Kálmán's registered length was 366.0 ft (111.6 m), her beam was 48.2 ft (14.7 m), her depth was 17.8 ft (5.4 m), and her draft was 23 ft (7.0 m). Her tonnages were 3,900 GRT, 2,432 NRT, and 5,976 DWT. She had a single screw, driven by a three-cylinder triple-expansion engine that was rated at 361 NHP or 1,500 ihp, and gave her a speed of 10 1/2 knots (19 km/h). Her contract price was £70,903, on which Wigham Richardson made £2,007 5s 3d profit. Her owner registered her in Fiume in Austria-Hungary (now Rijeka in Croatia). Her code letters were JSDR.

== Internment and seizure ==
When the First World War began in August 1914, Germany and Austria-Hungary ordered their merchant ships to return home if possible, or otherwise take shelter in a neutral port. Széll Kálmán took refuge in Recife in Pernambuco.

Brazil was neutral until 1917, when Germany resumed unrestricted submarine warfare. German U-boats then sank a number of Brazilian merchant ships, which led Brazil to suspend diplomatic relations with Germany on 11 April 1917, and seize all German ships in its ports on 2 June. Brazil interned the German crews on Ilha das Flores in Rio de Janeiro. The Austro-Hungarian Navy did not sink any Brazilian ships, but Brazil seems to have seized Széll Kálmán along with the German ships. On 26 October 1917, Brazil declared war against Germany, but not against the other Central Powers.

== Lydia ==
On 1 November 1917, the USSB started negotiating to either buy or charter merchant ships of the Central Powers from countries that had seized them. That December, the USSB chartered two Austro-Hungarian ships from China, and two German ships from Siam (now Thailand). The USSB eventually bought a total of nine Austro-Hungarian ships, with a total tonnage of 58,000 DWT. The USSB bought German ships from Brazil, and Austro-Hungarian ones from "other South American ports". USSB Chairman Edward N. Hurley's personal account of these purchases and charters does not mention any Austro-Hungarian ships from Brazil. However, it seems that the USSB acquired Széll Kálmán in either December 1917, or the first half of 1918.

Széll Kálmán was renamed Lydia, and registered in New York. In the edition of Seagoing Vessels of the United States, with Official Numbers and Signal Letters published for the year ending 30 June 1918, she appears with the code letters LKQF, but no US official number. By the time the Fifty-First Annual List of Merchant Vessels of the United States was published, for the year ending 30 June 1919, her US official number was 217022, and she was registered in Baltimore.

By 23 October 1918, Lydia was in port in Baltimore. On that day, the US Navy took her over, and on 26 October, she was commissioned as USS Lydia, with the Naval Registry 3524, and Lieutenant Commander Frederick W Taylor, USNRF, as her commanding officer. She was not equipped with defensive armament.

Lydia was assigned to the Naval Overseas Transportation Service. On 7 November she left Baltimore for Norfolk, Virginia. There she joined a convoy to Europe, which left on 15 November, four days after the Armistice of 11 November 1918. In the first week of December she arrived in Nantes, France, carrying aviation steel and general supplies. On 14 December she left Nantes, and on 4 January 1919 she reached Baltimore. There she loaded a cargo of food for the United States Food Administration, and on 7 February she left for the Mediterranean. On 16 March she reached Constantinople (now Istanbul), Turkey, where she discharged her cargo. A fortnight later, she left Constantinople in ballast, and on 9 May she reached Norfolk, VA. On 15 May she was decommissioned, and returned that same day to the USSB.

By July 1919, Lydia was equipped with wireless telegraphy. In 1919, the USSB sold the ship to the Lydia Steam Ship Co, Inc, and by late 1920 or early 1921 her manager was listed as F Auditore. By July 1922, she was equipped with submarine signalling. In late 1922 or early 1923, she was acquired by the Susquehanna Line, Inc.

== Manzoni ==
In 1924, the Adria Società Anonima di Navigazione Marittima bought Lydia, and registered her in Fiume. She was renamed Manzoni, and by 1926, her code letters were NXEQ. By 1934, her call sign was IBFU, and this had superseded her code letters. By 1935, she was equipped with wireless direction finding. "Tirrenia" Società Anonima di Navigazione had acquired her by July 1937.

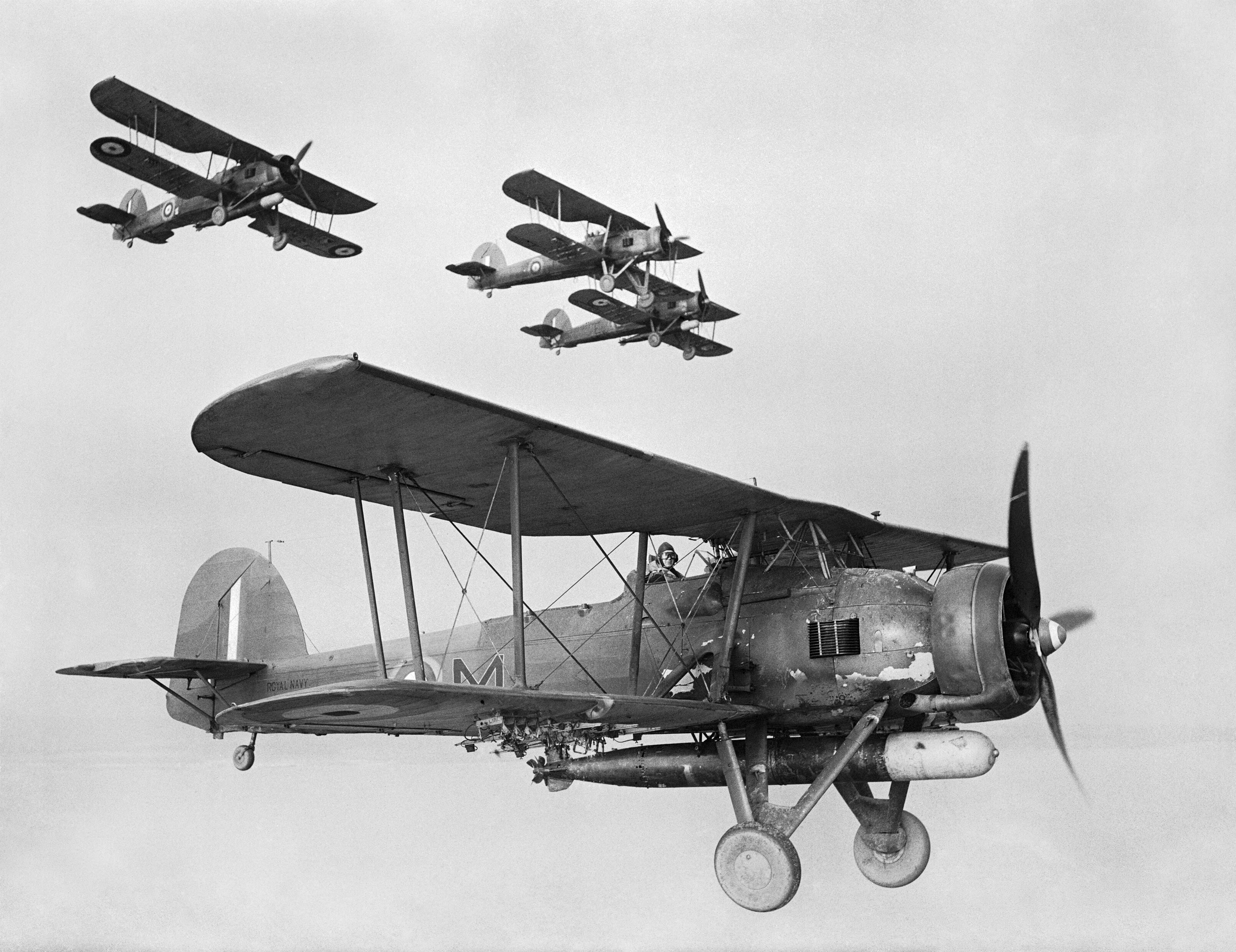
Fairey Swordfish Mark I aircraft, similar to those that torpedoed Italian ships in Tobruk

On 10 June 1940, Italy declared war against France and the United Kingdom. At dusk on 5 July 1940, Manzoni was in Tobruk in Libya, when 813 Naval Air Squadron of the Fleet Air Arm attacked the port with Fairey Swordfish torpedo bombers flying from HMS Eagle. Both Manzoni and the destroyer Zeffiro were sunk. The bow of the destroyer Euro was blown off, two other merchant ships were damaged, and these were beached to prevent their sinking. British salvors later raised Manzoni's wreck, and scrapped her.

== Bibliography ==
- Bureau of Navigation (1918). "Part VI". Seagoing Vessels of the United States (PDF). Washington, DC: United States Department of Commerce and Labor – via HyperWar.
- Bureau of Navigation (1919). Fifty-first Annual List of Merchant Vessels of the United States (PDF). Washington, DC: United States Department of Commerce and Labor – via HyperWar.
- Hurley, Edward N. (1927). The Bridge to France. Philadelphia & London: J. B. Lippincott Company. LCCN 27011802.
- Lloyd's Register of British and Foreign Shipping. Vol. I.–Steamers. London: Lloyd's Register of Shipping. 1902 – via Internet Archive.
- Lloyd's Register of Shipping. Vol. II.–Steamers. London: Lloyd's Register of Shipping. 1919 – via Internet Archive.
- Lloyd's Register of Shipping. Vol. II.–Steamers. London: Lloyd's Register of Shipping. 1920 – via Internet Archive.
- Lloyd's Register of Shipping. Vol. II.–Steamers and Motor Vessels. London: Lloyd's Register of Shipping. 1922 – via Internet Archive.
- Lloyd's Register of Shipping. Vol. II.–Steamers and Motorships. London: Lloyd's Register of Shipping. 1924 – via Internet Archive.
- Lloyd's Register of Shipping. Vol. II.–Steamers and Motorships. London: Lloyd's Register of Shipping. 1926 – via Internet Archive.
- Lloyd's Register of Shipping (PDF). Vol. II.–Steamers and Motorships of 300 Tons Gross and Over. London: Lloyd's Register of Shipping. 1934 – via Southampton City Council.
- Lloyd's Register of Shipping (PDF). Vol. II.–Steamers and Motorships over 300 Tons. London: Lloyd's Register of Shipping. 1935 – via Southampton City Council.
- Lloyd's Register of Shipping (PDF). Vol. II.–Steamers and Motorships of 300 Tons Gross and Over. London: Lloyd's Register of Shipping. 1937 – via Southampton City Council.
- Rohwer, Jürgen (2005). Chronology of the War at Sea 1939–1945: The Naval History of World War Two (Third Revision ed.). Annapolis, MD: Naval Institute Press. ISBN 1-59114-119-2.
- Smith, Peter C (1995). Eagle's War: War Diary of an Aircraft Carrier. Bristol: Crécy Books. ISBN 0-947554-60-2.
