= HMS Zinnia (K98) =

Flower-class corvette

History

United Kingdom
- Name: HMS Zinnia
- Ordered: 31 August 1939
- Builder: Smiths Dock Company, South Bank, Middlesbrough
- Laid down: 20 August 1940
- Launched: 28 November 1940
- Commissioned: 30 March 1941
- Identification: Pennant number: K98
- Fate: Sunk on 23 August 1941

General characteristics
- Class & type: Flower-class corvette
- Displacement: 925 long tons (940 t)
- Length: 205 ft (62 m)
- Beam: 33 ft (10 m)
- Draught: 11.5 ft (3.5 m)
- Propulsion: Two fire tube boilers; one 4-cycle triple-expansion steam engine
- Speed: 16 knots (30 km/h) at 2,750 hp (2,050 kW)
- Range: 3,500 nautical miles (6,500 km; 4,000 mi) at 12 knots (22 km/h; 14 mph)
- Complement: 85
- Armament: 1 × BL 4 in (102 mm) Mk IX gun, 2 × .50 inch (12.7 mm) twin machine guns, 2 × .303 inch (7.7 mm) Lewis machine guns; 2 × stern depth charge racks with 40 depth charges

HMS Zinnia was a Flower-class corvette that served in the Royal Navy.

She was built at Smiths Dock Company, South Bank-on-Tees, launched on 28 November 1940 and commissioned on 30 March 1941.

She protected convoys in the North Atlantic during the Second World War as part of the Battle of the Atlantic. On 23 August 1941, while escorting Convoy OG 71, she was hit by a torpedo from U-564, commanded by Reinhard Suhren, exploded and sank west of Portugal at 40°25′N 10°40′W.
