= Reidar Kobro =

Norwegian priest (1911–2003)

Reidar Kobro (16 October 1911 – 4 November 2003) was a Norwegian priest.

He was born in Mandal as a son of Reidar Kobro (1878–1966) og Emilie Knudsen (1886–1971). In 1937 he married Berit Mørland, a sister of Arnt J. C. Mørland and daughter of Arnt J. Mørland.

He took his secondary education at Kristiansand Cathedral School, and graduated from there in 1930. He enrolled as a student in the same year and graduated with the cand.theol. degree from the MF Norwegian School of Theology in 1935. He took the practical priest education in 1936 and was hired as an auxiliary priest at Åsnes Church in the same year. From 1937 he was a secretary at the MF Norwegian School of Theology. During the occupation of Norway by Nazi Germany he fled to Sweden. In 1943 he was hired as a priest for the Norwegian refugees there. He returned to Norway in 1945.

In 1946 he was hired as a secretary in Oslo småkirkeforening. He was hired in the Norwegian Church Abroad in London in 1949, and doubled as a priest at the Norwegian embassy in London from 1952. He was then a curate at Nøtterøy Church from 1957 to 1965, vicar in Uranienborg, Oslo from 1965 to 1971 and diocesan dean in Oslo Cathedral from 1971 to 1981. From 1964 to 1968 he chaired the Norwegian Association of Clergy. He chaired the MF Norwegian School of Theology's board from 1968 to 1970, and Oslo småkirkeforening from 1972. He died in November 2003 and was buried in Vestre gravlund. The road Reidar Kobros vei in Oslo has been named after him.
