= HMS Heartsease (K15) =

Flower-class corvette

History

United Kingdom
- Name: HMS Heartsease
- Ordered: 19 September 1939
- Builder: Harland and Wolff, Belfast, Northern Ireland
- Yard number: 1063
- Laid down: 14 November 1939
- Launched: 20 April 1940
- Completed: 4 June 1940
- Commissioned: 4 June 1940
- Decommissioned: 3 April 1942
- Identification: Pennant number: K15
- Fate: Transferred to the US Navy 3 April 1942

United States
- Name: USS Courage
- Acquired: 18 March 1942
- Commissioned: 3 April 1942
- Decommissioned: 22 August 1945
- Identification: Hull number: PG-70
- Fate: Returned to Royal Navy 23 August 1945

United Kingdom
- Name: HMS Heartsease
- Recommissioned: 23 August 1945
- Out of service: Sold into merchant service 22 July 1946
- Renamed: Roskva from 1951; Douglas from 1956; Seabird from 1958
- Fate: Sunk by Indonesian Air Force December 1958

General characteristics
- Class & type: Flower-class corvette
- Displacement: 925 long tons (940 t)
- Length: 208 ft 6 in (63.55 m)
- Beam: 33 ft (10 m)
- Draught: 11 ft 6 in (3.51 m)
- Propulsion: Two fire-tube boilers, one 4-cycle triple-expansion steam engine, generating 2,750 hp (2,050 kW)
- Speed: 16 knots (30 km/h; 18 mph)
- Range: 3,500 nautical miles (6,500 km; 4,000 mi) at 12 knots (22 km/h; 14 mph)
- Complement: 85
- Armament: 1 × 4-inch BL Mk.IX gun; 2 × 0.5-inch (12.7 mm) twin machine guns; 2 × 0.303-inch (7.7-mm) Lewis machine guns; 2 × stern depth charge racks with 40 depth charges

HMS Heartsease was a Flower-class corvette of the Royal Navy. She served with both the Royal Navy and the United States Navy during the Second World War, with the latter navy as USS Courage. She then spent several years under a succession of names in civilian service. In 1957 she was chartered on behalf of Indonesian rebels to smuggle rubber, copra and matériel. The Indonesian Air Force intercepted and sank her off the coast of Minahasa in North Sulawesi in December 1958.

== Construction and commissioning ==
Heartsease was originally to have been named HMS Pansy, but the name was changed prior to her launch. She was ordered on 19 September 1939 and laid down at the yards of Harland and Wolff, Belfast, Northern Ireland, on 14 November 1939. She was launched on 20 April 1940 and commissioned into service on 20 April 1940.

== Wartime service ==
=== Convoy escort ===
Heartsease spent most of her early career escorting convoys through British waters. On 22 September 1940 she picked up 31 survivors from the Norwegian merchant SS Simla which had been torpedoed and sunk by the German U-boat U-100 west of Ireland. On 15 October she rescued nine survivors from the British merchant SS Thistlegarth which had been sunk by U-103 45 nautical miles (83 km) west-north-west of Rockall. She was then called to the assistance of the inbound Convoy SC 7, which had come under attack from a U-boat wolfpack and was sustaining heavy losses. On arrival Heartsease was assigned to escort the damaged SS Carsbreck into port. On 23 December she collided with the Hunt-class destroyer HMS Tetcott in the Irish Sea. Both ships were saved and towed into port. A subsequent enquiry placed the blame on the captain of Heartsease.

=== American service ===
She was transferred to the US Navy on 3 April 1942 with Lt. Christopher Sylvanus Barker Jr., USN, commanding and renamed USS Courage. She patrolled the western Atlantic for most of her career as a United States ship, escorting convoys from as far north as Greenland to as far south as Argentina. From 24 January 1945, she was stationed at Iceland. She was returned to the Royal Navy on 23 August 1945, after the end of the war.

== Mercantile service ==
She was put up for disposal and was sold into civilian service on 22 July 1946. She was renamed Roskva in 1951, Douglas in 1956 and finally Seabird in 1958.

A Norwegian crew took her to the Far East as Douglas. In the latter part of 1957 a Chinese-Indonesian businessman, A.P. Lim, engaged her and her Norwegian captain to smuggle raw rubber from Sumatra to Johor on the Malay Peninsula and later to Singapore. Lim's client was the PRRI ("Revolutionary Government of the Republic of Indonesia") right-wing rebel movement, which was smuggling rubber out of Sumatra to fund its rebellion against the Indonesian government of President Sukarno.

Early in 1958 Indonesian forces defeated the PRRI in its main strongholds and ports on Sumatra, reducing its rebellion to a residual guerilla war. However, the PRRI was allied with the Permesta rebel movement in North Sulawesi, which was supported by Taiwan. In December 1958 Douglas, now renamed Seabird, smuggled a cargo of small arms, ammunition and M20 recoilless rifles from Taiwan to Bolaang Bay on the coast of Minahasa. There she began to load a cargo of copra, which Permesta was smuggling out of Minahasa to fund its rebellion. However, before she could start her voyage the Indonesian Air Force found Seabird and sank her.

Seabird was announced missing in December 1958 and a month later she was declared lost in the Celebes Sea, with the cause of her loss officially declared as "unknown".

== Sources ==
- Colledge, J. J.; Warlow, Ben (2006) [1969]. Ships of the Royal Navy: The Complete Record of All Fighting Ships of the Royal Navy from the 15th Century to the Present (3rd Rev ed.). London: Chatham Publishing. ISBN 978-1-86176-281-8. OCLC 67375475.
- Conboy, Kenneth; Morrison, James (1999). Feet to the Fire CIA Covert Operations in Indonesia, 1957–1958. Annapolis: Naval Institute Press. ISBN 1-55750-193-9.
- Coy, Peter (December 2006). The Echo of a Fighting Flower. Lulu.com. p. 25. ISBN 9781847539472.
