= Thor Martin Nilsen Sauvik =

Norwegian politician

Thor Martin Nilsen Sauvik (15 May 1889 – 21 July 1965) was a Norwegian politician for the Christian Democratic Party.

He was born in Søndeled Municipality. In 1916 he founded the boat manufacturing company Nilsen og Brødrene Moens båtbyggeri, and ran the company for the rest of his life. From 1946 it was named Sauviks båtbyggeri.

Sauvik was a member of the municipal council of Søndeled Municipality from 1919 to 1931, then again from 1937 to 1940 serving as deputy mayor. The Christian Democratic Party did not exist at the time, but after it was founded, Sauvik chaired Aust-Agder Christian Democratic Party from 1953 to 1956. He was highly involved in the local inner mission.

He served as a deputy representative to the Parliament of Norway from Aust-Agder during the terms 1954–57 and 1958–61. From September 1957 and for the rest of the first term, he met as a regular representative following the death of Arnt J. Mørland. In total he met during 364 days of parliamentary session.
