= Arnt J. C. Mørland =

Norwegian ship-owner

Arnt Jacob Conrad Mørland (1 April 1921 – 26 January 1994) was a Norwegian ship-owner.

== Personal life ==
He was born in Arendal as a son of ship-owner and politician Arnt J. Mørland (1888–1957) and Constance Thomsen. A sister, Berit Mørland, married dean Reidar Kobro. In 1951 he married Turid Gulli.

== Career ==
He finished secondary education at Kristiansand Commerce School in 1941. He was taken into the family company Arnt J. Mørland in 1946, where he was the sole owner from 1957. He was also the manager of the family companies Agdesidens Rederi, Mørlands Rederi, Mørlands Shipping Co. and Mørlands Tankrederi. He was a supervisory council member of Christiania Bank og Kreditkasse from 1959, and of local insurance trusts in Arendal. He died in January 1994.
