= SS Potrero del Llano =

Oil tanker built in 1912

Coordinates: 25°35′N 80°06′W

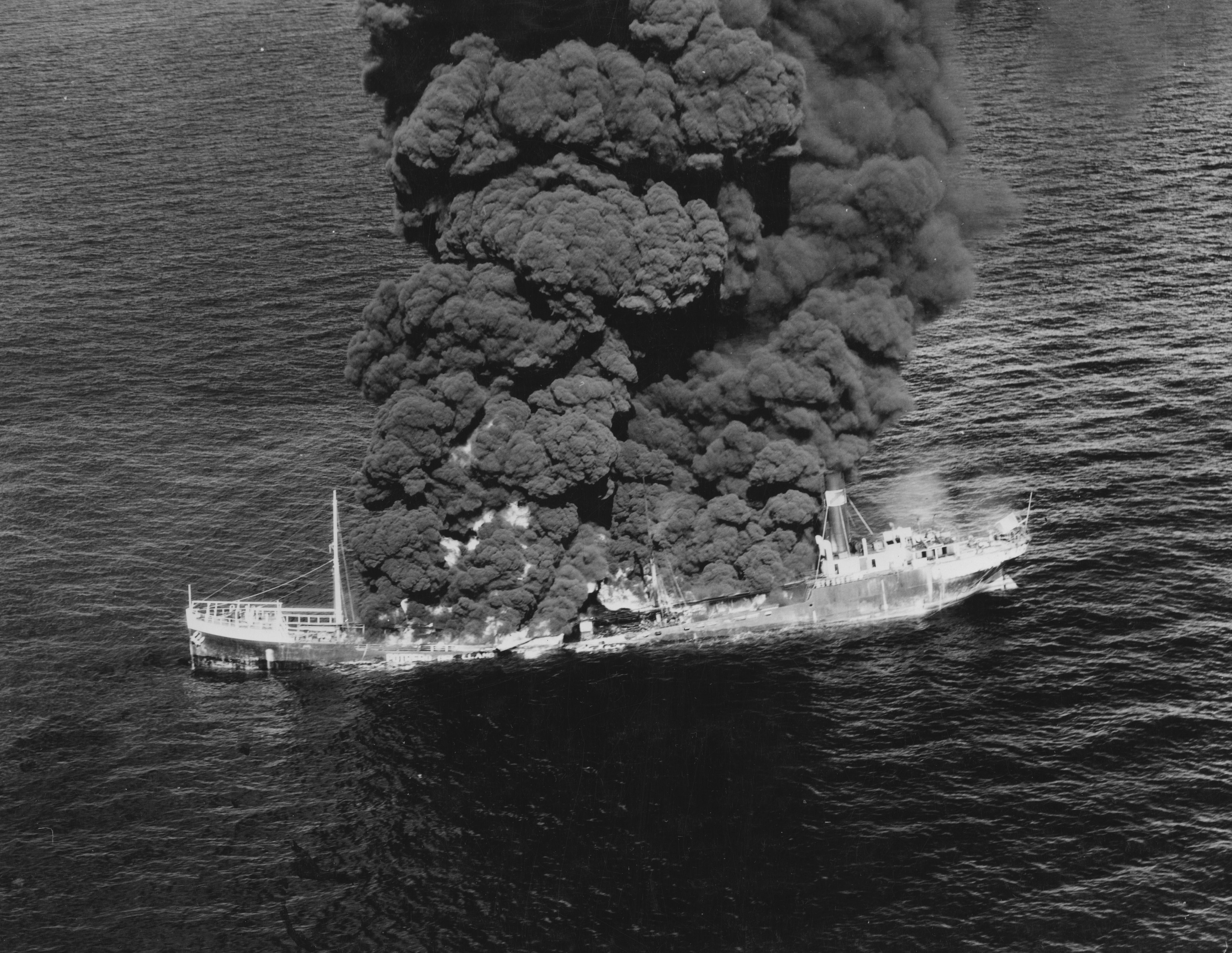

History
- Name: F.A. Tamplin (1912–1921); Arminco (1921–1930); Lucifero (1930–1941); Potrero del Llano (1941–1942)
- Owner: T.W. Tamplin & Co, London (1912-1921); SA d'Armement, d'Industrie & de Commerce, Antwerp (1912–1930); Società Italiana Transporti Petroliferi (SITP), Genoa (1930–1941); Petróleos Mexicanos (Pemex), Tampico (1941–1942)
- Port of registry: (Mexico) Tampico (1941–1942)
- Builder: Palmers Shipbuilding and Iron Company, Hebburn-on-Tyne
- Launched: 6 November 1912
- Completed: December 1912
- Fate: Torpedoed and sunk on 14 May 1942

General characteristics
- Type: Steam tanker
- Tonnage: 4,000 GRT

SS Potrero del Llano was an oil tanker built in 1912. It sailed for a number of companies, and survived service in the First World War, only to be torpedoed and sunk by a German U-boat during the Second World War while sailing under the Mexican flag off the coast of Florida. Its sinking contributed to Mexico's decision to enter the war on the side of the Allies.

Potrero del Llano was originally built by Palmers Shipbuilding and Iron Company, Hebburn-on-Tyne as the F.A. Tamplin, for service with T.W. Tamplin & Co., of London. It was sold in 1921 to the Belgian company SA d'Armement, d'Industrie & de Commerce, of Antwerp, and was renamed Arminco, and was sold again in 1930 to the Italian company Società Italiana Transporti Petroliferi (SITP), of Genoa, and was renamed Lucifero. it was interned while docked at Tampico, in Mexico on 10 June 1940 and was seized in 1941 by the Mexican government and renamed Potrero del Llano after a town in Veracruz. it was operated by Petróleos Mexicanos (Pemex), and was homeported in Tampico.

Potrero del Llano was sailing unescorted from Tampico to New York City in May 1942, carrying 6,132 tons of petroleum. It was sighted by the German submarine U-564, under Reinhard Suhren at 07:17 hours on 14 May 1942, while east of the coast of Florida. Suhren noticed an illuminated flag painted on the side of the ship but misidentified it as the Italian flag. Since only ships of the Mexican Navy were permitted to display the Mexican flag with the eagle in the centre, the flag shown by the Potrero del Llano resembled the Italian one, and having decided that the tanker's position and course meant that she could not be Italian, Suhren decided to sink her. U-564 duly torpedoed the Potrero del Llano, which sank with the loss of 13 of its crew. Twenty-two survivors were picked up by USS PC-536 and taken to Miami. One of the survivors, José Reyes Sosa, survived another attack on Las Choapas, a tanker sunk by U-129 on 27 June 1942, and the fourth Mexican tanker sunk by German submarines.

On 20 May 1942 a second tanker, Faja de Oro, was attacked and sunk, this time by U-106. This established a sound casus belli for the Mexican government to declare war on the Axis powers on 22 May 1942.

Schematic representation of a U-boot type VII C

Side view of a U-Boot type VII C
