= SS Empire Cloud =

World War II merchant ship of the United Kingdom

History
- Name: Empire Cloud
- Owner: Ministry of War Transport
- Operator: Allen, Black & Co Ltd
- Port of registry: (United Kingdom) Sunderland
- Builder: William Pickersgill & Sons Ltd
- Launched: 27 December 1940
- Completed: April 1941
- Out of service: 21 August 1942
- Identification: Code Letters BCGC; United Kingdom Official Number 168668
- Fate: Torpedoed and sunk on 21 August 1942

General characteristics
- Type: Cargo ship
- Tonnage: 5,969 GRT; 3,546 NRT
- Length: 401 ft 0 in (122.22 m)
- Beam: 54 ft 0 in (16.46 m)
- Depth: 33 ft 2 in (10.11 m)
- Installed power: Triple expansion steam engine
- Propulsion: Screw propeller
- Crew: 46, plus 8 DEMS gunners.

Location of the sinking of Empire Cloud off Venezuela.

Empire Cloud was a 5,969 GRT cargo ship which was built in 1940 by William Pickersgill & Sons Ltd, Sunderland for the Ministry of War Transport (MoWT). She was torpedoed on her maiden voyage, but repaired and returned to service. In 1942, she was torpedoed and sank whilst under tow to port.

== Description ==
The ship was built by William Pickersgill & Sons Ltd, Sunderland. She was launched on 27 December 1940 and completed in April 1941.

The ship was 401 feet 0 inches (122.22 m) long, with a beam of 54 feet 0 inches (16.46 m) and a depth of 33 feet 2 inches (10.11 m). She had a GRT of 5,669 and a NRT of 3,546.

The ship was propelled by a triple expansion steam engine, which had cylinders of 23 1/2 inches (60 cm), 38 inches (97 cm) and 66 inches (170 cm) diameter by 45 inches (110 cm) stroke. The engine was built by George Clarke (1938) Ltd, Sunderland.

== History ==
Empire Cloud was built for the MoWT. She was placed under the management of Allen, Black & Co Ltd. Her port of registry was Sunderland. The Code Letters BCGC and United Kingdom Official Number 168668 were allocated.

Empire Cloud was a member of a number of convoys during the Second World War.

OB 318

Convoy OB 318 departed from Liverpool on 2 May 1941 and dispersed at sea on 10 May. Empire Cloud was on her maiden voyage. At 14:28 on 9 May, Empire Cloud was torpedoed and damaged by U-201 when east northeast of Cape Farewell (61°00′N 32°30′W). Five crew were killed, the survivors were picked up by HMS Nigella. The ship was abandoned, but HMS St Apollo assisted in the protection of her while the Dutch tug Thames was despatched from Reykjavík, Iceland. HMS Hollyhock also assisted Empire Cloud. Thames arrived on 13 May and towed Empire Cloud at 6 knots (11 km/h) to Greenock, where she arrived on 20 May. She was repaired and returned to service.

HX 167

Empire Cloud may have sailed in Convoy HX 167, which departed Halifax, Nova Scotia on 27 December 1941 and arrived at Liverpool on 11 January 1942. She is noted under Convoy SC 63 as having come from HX 167.

SC 63

Convoy SC 63 departed from Sydney, Cape Breton on 3 January 1942 and dispersed at sea on 13 January. Empire Cloud was carrying a general cargo and was bound for Manchester.

TAW(S)

Empire Cloud was a member of Convoy TAW(S). At about 10:10 on 19 August 1942, Empire Cloud was torpedoed by U-564 northeast of Trinidad with the loss of three crew members. The Dutch tug Roode Zee took her in tow, but she sank on 21 August at 10°54′N 62°10′W. The surviving crew were rescued by other ships in the convoy. They were landed at Key West, Florida and Mobile, Alabama. Those lost on Empire Cloud are commemorated at the Tower Hill Memorial, London.
