= MT Vardaas =

History

Norway
- Name: Vardaas
- Owner: Agdesidens Rederi A/S
- Operator: Agdesidens Rederi / Nortraship
- Port of registry: (Norway) Arendal
- Launched: 1931
- Completed: April 1931
- Fate: Sunk, 31 August 1942

General characteristics
- Type: Oil tanker
- Tonnage: 12,683 DWT

MT Vardaas was a Norwegian oil tanker, built in 1931. She could carry 12,683 DWT. Sailing for Arnt J. Mørland's shipping company and Nortraship, while on its way from Cape Town to Trinidad carrying dead freight, the ship was hit by a torpedo from the German submarine U-564 on 30 August 1942. All crew of 41 escaped in lifeboats and landed in Plymouth Bay, Tobago.
