= SS Ariosto =

Cargo steamship that served in both World Wars

History
- Name: 1902: Báró Fejérváry; 1914: Bulganak; 1918: Báró Fejérváry; 1922: Ariosto
- Namesake: 1902: Baron Géza Fejérváry; 1914: Bulganak river; 1922: Ludovico Ariosto
- Owner: 1902: "Adria" Royal Hungarian Sea Nav Co, Ltd; 1920: Adria SA di Nav Mar; 1937: "Tirrenia" SA di Nav
- Operator: 1914: (Russian Empire) Imperial Russian Navy; 1918: (Russian Soviet Federative Socialist Republic) Soviet Navy
- Port of registry: 1902: (Austria-Hungary) Fiume; 1920: (Free State of Fiume) Fiume; 1922: (Kingdom of Italy) Fiume
- Builder: Wigham Richardson & Co, Low Walker
- Cost: £70,296
- Yard number: 390
- Launched: 9 May 1902
- Completed: 31 June 1902
- Acquired: by Russian Navy: 5 August 1914
- Identification: 1902: code letters JCFP; 1924: code letters NETH; by 1940: call sign IBQC
- Fate: sunk by torpedo, 15 Feb 1942

General characteristics
- Type: cargo steamship
- Tonnage: 3,886 GRT, 2,460 NRT, 5,980 DWT
- Length: 375 ft (114 m) overall; 365.3 ft (111.3 m) registered
- Beam: 48.2 ft (14.7 m)
- Depth: 17.8 ft (5.4 m)
- Decks: 1
- Installed power: 1 × triple-expansion engine, 361 NHP
- Propulsion: 1 × screw
- Crew: in 1942: 34
- Sensors & processing systems: by 1940: wireless direction finding
- Notes: sister ships: Arad, Széll Kálmán

SS Ariosto was a cargo steamship. She was launched in England in 1902 as Báró Fejérváry for an Austro-Hungarian shipping company. The Imperial Russian Navy seized her in 1914 and renamed her Bulganak. In 1918 she was returned to her owners, and her name reverted to Báró Fejérváry. After the First World War, she was one of the few merchant ships to be registered in the short-lived Free State of Fiume. By 1922, she had been renamed Ariosto, and transferred to the Italian registry. In 1942, a Royal Navy submarine sank her in the Mediterranean, killing 138 of the UK and Commonwealth prisoners of war whom she was carrying, and 20 members of her crew.

== Three sister ships ==
In 1901 and 1902, Wigham Richardson & Co, Ltd, built three sister ships for the "Adria" Royal Hungarian Sea Navigation Co, Ltd. Yard number 381 was launched on 30 September 1901 as Arad, and completed that November. Yard number 383 was launched on 29 January 1902 as Széll Kálmán, and was completed on 24 March. Yard number 390 was launched on 9 May 1902, by a Miss Mary Spence of North Shields, as Báró Fejérváry, after the Hungarian soldier and statesman Baron Géza Fejérváry de Komlóskeresztes, and completed that June.

Báró Fejérváry's lengths were 375 ft (114 m) overall, and 365.3 ft (111.3 m) registered. Her beam was 48.2 ft (14.7 m), and her depth was 17.8 ft (5.4 m). Her tonnages were 3,886 GRT, 2,460 NRT, and 5,980 DWT. She had a single screw, driven by a three-cylinder triple-expansion engine, which was rated at 361 NHP. Her contract price was £70,296, on which Wigham Richardson made £4,803 5s 6d profit. Her owner registered her in Fiume in Austria-Hungary (now Rijeka in Croatia). Her code letters were JCFP.

== Bulganak ==
When the First World War began, Báró Fejérváry was in Nikolayev (now Mykolaiv in Ukraine). Russian authorities seized her, and on 5 August 1914 the Imperial Russian Navy took her over. She was renamed Bulganak, after the Bulganak river in Crimea.

On 3 March 1918, the RSFSR signed the Treaty of Brest-Litovsk, ending Russia's war with the Central Powers. However, the Soviet Navy seems to have retained Bulganak, and not returned her to her owner. At the end of April, elements of the Black Sea Fleet withdrew from Sevastopol to Novorossiysk, to avoid being seized by the Central Powers. On 18 June, some of the naval ships were scuttled in Tsemes Bay. Ten days later, a German and Ottoman naval squadron entered Novorossiysk, and seized merchant and naval transport ships in the port. Bulganak was returned to her owners, and her name was restored to Báró Fejérváry.

== Changes in Fiume ==
In October 1918, the Austro-Hungarian Empire disintegrated. Under the Fiume question, three countries claimed Báró Fejérváry's port of registry: the corpus separatum of Fiume. These were Hungary, Italy, and the new Kingdom of Serbs, Croats, and Slovenes – which later became Yugoslavia. Toward the end of October, Yugoslav troops took over Fiume, which in Croatian is called Rijeka. Hungary abandoned Fiume, and on 30 October, the Italian National Council of Fiume proclaimed the territory to be part of Italy. The "Fiume question" was part of a geographically bigger sovereignty dispute over the Austrian Littoral. The Entente Powers responded by occupying the eastern Adriatic coast, including Fiume. On 2 November 1918, a United States Navy flotilla entered Fiume. The next day, Austria-Hungary signed the Armistice of Villa Giusti with the Entente powers, and French and UK naval ships reinforced the Entente presence in Fiume. On 4 November, the first Italian Navy ships arrived in Fiume. On 15 November, Yugoslav troops arrived in Fiume, but two days later, a bigger Italian force arrived, and the Yugoslavs withdrew. In September 1919, a force of Italian soldiers, led by Gabriele D'Annunzio, but independent of the Italian high command, occupied Fiume, and declared the independent Italian Regency of Carnaro. The regency ruled Fiume for 15 months, until the Treaty of Rapallo replaced it with the Free State of Fiume, implemented in December 1920. The free state ruled Fiume for just over three years, until the Treaty of Rome transferred the territory to Italy in February 1924.

In this turbulent period, Báró Fejérváry is absent from the annual edition of Lloyd's Register published in July 1919. She reappears in the July 1920 edition, with her owner given as simply "Adria Co"; no nationality attached to her registration in Fiume; and no code letters. The July 1921 edition gives her owner as Adria Società Anonima di Navigazione Marittima. By the time the July 1922 edition was published, she still had no code letters, but had been renamed Ariosto, presumably after the Renaissance poet Ludovico Ariosto. Fiume was a free state in 1922, but the ship's nationality is given as "Italian", and she still had no code letters. By July 1924, after the Treaty of Rome had annexed Fiume to Italy, Ariosto had new code letters: NETH. She continues to appear in Lloyd's Register until July 1931, after which she disappears for the next eight years. Given the impact of the Great Depression on the Italian economy, and the fact that she was by then three decades old, she may have been laid up, and considered for scrap.

In 1937, the "Tirrenia" Società Anonima di Navigazione bought Ariosto, but she does not reappear in Lloyd's Register until July 1940. She was updated with the installation of wireless direction finding, and with the wireless telegraph call sign IBQC.

== Loss ==
Ariosto supported Italian forces in the North African campaign. An Allied aerial reconnaissance photograph dated 6 February 1942 shows ships in port in Tripoli, one of which is identified as Ariosto.

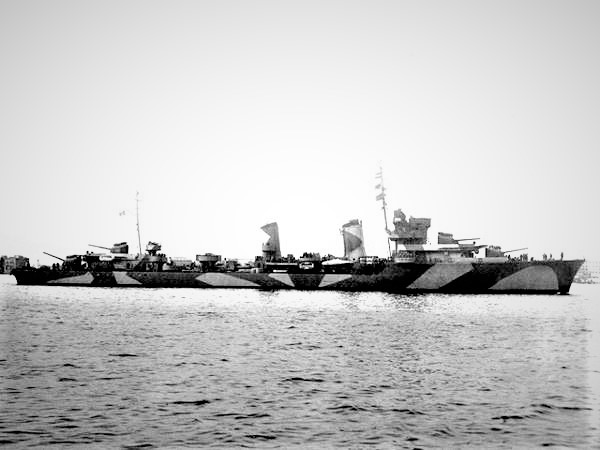
The Italian destroyer Premuda

At 17:00 hrs on 13 February, Ariosto left Tripoli for Palermo. She carried 294 UK and Commonwealth PoW's, 82 German and Italian troops returning home, and a crew of 34: a total 0f 410 people. She was in convoy with the DG „Neptun“ cargo ship Atlas, which carried another 150 PoW's. They were escorted by the Italian Navy destroyer Premuda, and the torpedo boat Polluce. UK aircraft from Malta continuously attacked the convoy, including torpedo bombers after midnight on 14 February. The convoy returned fire with machine guns, and Ariosto evaded a torpedo attack by a submarine.

On the evening of 14 February, at either 22:00 or 23:35 hrs (accounts differ), the submarine HMS P38 hit Ariosto with either one or two torpedoes. The cargo ship remained afloat for about an hour, and then broke in two. Her stern section stayed afloat for some time after her bow section sank. She sank in the small hours of 15 February, 11 or 12 nautical miles (20 or 22 km) east of Cap Afrique, near Mahdia in Tunisia. According to one UK survivor's account, members of the Italian crew abandoned ship, forsaking the PoW's, who found the remaining lifeboats wrecked. According to the grandson of one of the Italians who did not survive, the other ships in the convoy at first fled to avoid being torpedoed. Only some hours later did the escorts Premuda and Polluce return to rescue survivors. The total number of people rescued by the two escorts was 252. One PoW, who was rescued by an Italian warship, was landed in Sicily, and compiled a list of 154 surviving PoWs. 138 PoWs, and 20 crew members, are believed to have died. The bodies of a few victims were recovered, and are buried in Tunisia.

== Bibliography ==
- Bartulović, Željko (2000). "Sušak u odnosima Kraljevine SHS i Italije 1918-1925" [Sušak in the Relations Between the Kingdom of Serbs, Croats and Slovenes and the Kingdom of Italy (1918–1925)]. Zbornik Pravnog fakulteta u Zagrebu (in Croatian). 50 (6). Zagreb: University of Zagreb: 957–988. ISSN 0350-2058.
- Drinković, Damir (2023). Riječki ljetopis: Rijeka u pisanim izvorima = Annali di Fiume [Rijeka Chronicle: Rijeka in Written Sources] (in English, Croatian, and Italian). Rijeka: Rijeka City Library. ISBN 978-953-8493-00-3.
- "No. 596. — Italy and the Kingdom of the Serbs, Croats and Slovenes". League of Nations Treaty Series. 24. Geneva: United Nations: 32–89. 27 January 1924.
- Ledeen, Michael Arthur (2002). D'Annunzio: the First Duce. New Brunswick, NJ: Transaction Publishers. ISBN 978-1412821230.
- Lloyd's Register of British and Foreign Shipping. Vol. I.–Steamers. London: Lloyd's Register of Shipping. 1902 – via Internet Archive.
- Lloyd's Register of Shipping. Vol. II.–Steamers. London: Lloyd's Register of Shipping. 1920 – via Internet Archive.
- Lloyd's Register of Shipping. Vol. II.–Steamers. London: Lloyd's Register of Shipping. 1921 – via Internet Archive.
- Lloyd's Register of Shipping. Vol. II.–Steamers and Motor Vessels. London: Lloyd's Register of Shipping. 1922 – via Internet Archive.
- Lloyd's Register of Shipping. Vol. II.–Steamers and Motor Vessels. London: Lloyd's Register of Shipping. 1924 – via Internet Archive.
- Lloyd's Register of Shipping (PDF). Vol. II.–Steamers and Motorships of 300 Tons Gross and Over. London: Lloyd's Register of Shipping. 1931 – via Southampton City Council.
- Lloyd's Register of Shipping (PDF). Vol. I.–Steamers and Motorships of 300 Tons Gross. Trawlers, Tugs, Dredgers, Etc. London: Lloyd's Register of Shipping. 1940 – via Southampton City Council.
- Patafta, Daniel (2006). "Privremene vlade u Rijeci (listopad 1918. – siječanj 1924.)" [Temporary Governments in Rijeka, October 1918 – January 1924]. Časopis za suvremenu povijest (in Croatian). 38 (1). Zagreb: Croatian Institute of History: 197–222. ISSN 0590-9597.
- Prister, Boris (2019). "Spomen-medalja ekspedicije u Rijeku (Medaglia commemorativa della spedizione di Fiume)" [Memorial Medal of the Rijeka Expedition (Medaglia commemorativa della spedizione di Fiume)]. Numizmatičke Vijesti (in Croatian). 61 (72). Zagreb: Croatian Numismatical Society: 170–183. ISSN 0546-9422.
- "Treaty Between the Kingdom of Italy and the Kingdom of the Serbs, Croats, and Slovenes Signed at Rapallo" (PDF). Ungarisches Institut München. 12 November 1920.
