= German submarine U-564 =

German World War II submarine

History

Nazi Germany
- Name: U-564
- Ordered: 24 October 1939
- Builder: Blohm & Voss, Hamburg
- Yard number: 540
- Laid down: 30 March 1940
- Launched: 7 February 1941
- Commissioned: 3 April 1941
- Fate: Sunk on 14 June 1943

General characteristics
- Class & type: Type VIIC U-boat
- Displacement: 769 tonnes (757 long tons) surfaced; 871 t (857 long tons) submerged
- Length: 67.10 m (220 ft 2 in) o/a; 50.50 m (165 ft 8 in) pressure hull
- Beam: 6.20 m (20 ft 4 in) o/a; 4.70 m (15 ft 5 in) pressure hull
- Draught: 4.74 m (15 ft 7 in)
- Installed power: 2,800–3,200 PS (2,100–2,400 kW; 2,800–3,200 bhp) (diesels); 750 PS (550 kW; 740 shp) (electric)
- Propulsion: 2 shafts; 2 × diesel engines; 2 × electric motors
- Speed: 17.7 knots (32.8 km/h; 20.4 mph) surfaced; 7.6 knots (14.1 km/h; 8.7 mph) submerged
- Range: 8,500 nmi (15,700 km; 9,800 mi) surfaced; 80 nmi (150 km; 92 mi) submerged
- Test depth: 230 m (750 ft); Calculated crush depth: 250–295 m (820–968 ft)
- Complement: 44 to 52 officers and ratings
- Armament: 5 × 53.3 cm (21 in) torpedo tubes (four bow, one stern); 14 × torpedoes or 26 TMA mines; 1 × 8.8 cm (3.46 in) deck gun (220 rounds); 1 x 2 cm (0.79 in) C/30 AA gun

Service record
- Part of: 1st U-boat Flotilla; 3 April – 14 June 1943
- Identification codes: M 40 175
- Commanders: K.Kapt. Reinhard Suhren; 3 April 1941 – 1 October 1942; Oblt.z.S. Hans Fiedler; 1 October 1942 – 14 June 1943
- Operations: 9 patrols: 1st patrol: 17 June – 27 July 1941; 2nd patrol: 16 – 27 August 1941; 3rd patrol: a. 16 September – 1 November 1941; b. 11 – 12 January 1942; 4th patrol: 18 January – 6 March 1942; 5th patrol: 4 April – 6 June 1942; 6th patrol: 9 July – 18 September 1942; 7th patrol: 27 October – 30 December 1942; 8th patrol: 11 March – 15 April 1943; 9th patrol: a. 15 – 17 May 1943; b. 31 May – 3 June 1943; c. 9 – 14 June 1943
- Victories: 18 merchant ships sunk (95,544 GRT); 1 warship sunk (900 tons); 4 merchant ships damaged (28,907 GRT)

German submarine U-564 was a Type VIIC U-boat built for Nazi Germany's Kriegsmarine for service during the Second World War. The RAF sank her in the Bay of Biscay on 14 June 1943.

== Design ==
German Type VIIC submarines were preceded by the shorter Type VIIB submarines. U-564 had a displacement of 769 tonnes (757 long tons) when at the surface and 871 tonnes (857 long tons) while submerged. She had a total length of 67.10 m (220 ft 2 in), a pressure hull length of 50.50 m (165 ft 8 in), a beam of 6.20 m (20 ft 4 in), a height of 9.60 m (31 ft 6 in), and a draught of 4.74 m (15 ft 7 in). The submarine was powered by two Germaniawerft F46 four-stroke, six-cylinder supercharged diesel engines producing a total of 2,800 to 3,200 metric horsepower (2,060 to 2,350 kW; 2,760 to 3,160 shp) for use while surfaced, two Brown, Boveri & Cie GG UB 720/8 double-acting electric motors producing a total of 750 metric horsepower (550 kW; 740 shp) for use while submerged. She had two shafts and two 1.23 m (4 ft) propellers. The boat was capable of operating at depths of up to 230 metres (750 ft).

The submarine had a maximum surface speed of 17.7 knots (32.8 km/h; 20.4 mph) and a maximum submerged speed of 7.6 knots (14.1 km/h; 8.7 mph). When submerged, the boat could operate for 80 nautical miles (150 km; 92 mi) at 4 knots (7.4 km/h; 4.6 mph); when surfaced, she could travel 8,500 nautical miles (15,700 km; 9,800 mi) at 10 knots (19 km/h; 12 mph). U-564 was fitted with five 53.3 cm (21 in) torpedo tubes (four fitted at the bow and one at the stern), fourteen torpedoes, one 8.8 cm (3.46 in) SK C/35 naval gun, 220 rounds, and a 2 cm (0.79 in) C/30 anti-aircraft gun. The boat had a complement of between forty-four and sixty.

== Service history ==
She was ordered on 24 October 1939 and was laid down on 30 March 1940 at Blohm & Voss, Hamburg, as ' 540'. She was launched on 7 February 1941 and commissioned under her first commander Oberleutnant zur See Reinhard Suhren on 3 April of that year. Her chief engineer under Suhren was Ulrich Gabler. Suhren commanded her for her work-up with the 1st U-boat Flotilla between 3 April and 1 June 1941. She then became a front (operational) boat of the 1st U-boat Flotilla, and set out on her first patrols.

=== Early patrols ===
Her first patrol took U-564 from Kiel to Brest in occupied France, spending a total of 41 days at sea. The patrol brought a number of successes; on 27 June Suhren came across convoy HX 133. He damaged the Norwegian tanker Kongsgaard and sank the Dutch Maasdam and the British Malaya II that day. He had one further success on that patrol, sinking the Icelandic merchantman Hekla on 29 June. U-564 put into Brest on 27 July, having sunk three merchant ships for 18,678 gross register tons (GRT), and damaged another for 9,467 GRT.

She sailed again from Brest on 16 August, heading into the Atlantic. She came across convoy OG 71 and sank the Irish Conlara and the British tug Empire Oak on 22 August. She sank an escort the following day, HMS Zinnia. U-564 returned to Brest on 27 August after 12 days at sea, having sunk three ships for 2,587 GRT. She sailed again on 16 September, this time encountering convoy HG 75 on 24 October. She sank three British merchantmen that day, Alhama, Ariosto and Carsbreck. U-564 was attacked later in the evening, by a bomb from an aircraft and later by an escort with depth charges. She escaped damage however, and returned to port at Lorient on 1 November having spent 47 days at sea and sunk three ships for 1,687 and 900 tons.

U-564 relocated to La Pallice in early 1942, and sailed from there on 18 January. She sank the Canadian tanker Victolite 260 nautical miles (480 km; 300 mi) northwest of Bermuda on 11 February 1942, and damaged the British tanker Opalia, although not severely (her deck gun firing 83 rounds, but only scoring three hits), on 16 February, before returning to Brest on 6 March, after 48 days on patrol with 11,410 GRT sunk and 6,195 GRT damaged.

=== Off the American coast ===
U-564 sailed from Brest on 4 April 1942, to cross the Atlantic and prey on shipping off the North American coast, including Florida. She was in position in early May and on 3 May, secured her first success, sinking the British Ocean Venus. On the 4 May, she damaged the British Eclipse, and on 5 May she damaged the American Delisle. On 8 May she sank the American merchantman Ohian, the following day she sank the Panamanian tanker Lubrafol. Her final success in American waters was to sink the Mexican tanker Potrero del Llano. U-564 arrived back in Brest on 6 June, having spent 64 days at sea and sunk four ships, for 24,390 GRT, and damaged two ships, for 13,245 GRT.

U-564 repeated the exercise on her next patrol, departing Brest on 6 July to operate off the coast of South America. Whilst outward-bound across the Atlantic, Suhren came across convoy OS-34 near the Azores, and on 19 July sank the British merchant Empire Hawksbill, and damaged the Lavington Court (sank 1 August whilst under tow back to the UK). Operating off the northern South America coast, he sank the SS British Consul and the Empire Cloud west of Grenada on 19 August and on the 30th, she sank the Norwegian tanker Vardaas north of Scarborough. U-564 arrived back in Brest on 18 September after 72 days on patrol, having sunk five ships for 32,181 GRT.

=== Fiedler takes charge ===
This was Suhren's last patrol as commander of U-564. He left on 1 October to become an instructor, Oberleutnant zur See Hans Fiedler took command. He took the boat on two war patrols in 1943 but failed to hit any enemy ships. On one of these sorties events took a dramatic turn when the U-boat lost a crewman, Fähnrich zur See (Ensign) Heinrich Fuerhake. U-564 was transferred to operate out of Bordeaux in April 1943. She left the French port city for the final time on 9 June with four other outbound U-boats, U-185, U-358, U-634 and U-653. A Royal Air Force Short Sunderland spotted the boats and attacked them off Cape Finisterre at 18.59 hours on 13 June. The aircraft targeted U-564 and dropped its bombs, but was shot down by anti-aircraft fire, killing all 11 of the crew. U-564 had sustained heavy damage and turned back, escorted by U-185.

=== Wolfpacks ===
U-564 took part in six wolfpacks, namely:

- Brandenburg (16 – 19 September 1941)
- Breslau (2 – 29 October 1941)
- Natter (2 – 8 November 1942)
- Westwall (8 – 16 December 1942)
- Seeteufel (21 – 30 March 1943)
- Löwenherz (1 – 10 April 1943)

== Sinking ==
An Armstrong Whitworth Whitley sighted the two U-boats in the Bay of Biscay the following day and shadowed them. U-564 was unable to dive due to the damage already sustained. By 16:45 hours the Whitley was running low on fuel and attacked U-564. The two U-boats damaged their attacker with anti-aircraft fire but the aircraft's depth charges fatally damaged U-564 and she sank at 17:30 hours. The damaged Whitley was forced to ditch, where a French trawler rescued the crew. There were 18 survivors from U-564 including the commander. U-185 picked them up and transferred them to the German destroyer Z24 two hours later.

== Summary of raiding history ==
Date	Ship Name	Nationality	Tonnage (Note: Merchant ship tonnages are in gross register tons. Military vessels are listed by tons displacement.)	Fate
27 June 1941	Kongsgaard	Norway	9,467	Damaged
27 June 1941	Maasdam	Netherlands	8,812	Sunk
27 June 1941	Malaya II	United Kingdom	8,651	Sunk
29 June 1941	Hekla	Iceland	1,215	Sunk
22 August 1941	Clonlara	Ireland	1,203	Sunk
22 August 1941	Empire Oak	United Kingdom	484	Sunk
22 August 1941	HMS Zinnia	Royal Navy	900	Sunk
24 October 1941	Alhama	United Kingdom	1,352	Sunk
24 October 1941	Ariosto	United Kingdom	2,176	Sunk
24 October 1941	Carsbreck	United Kingdom	3,670	Sunk
11 February 1942	Victolite	Canada	11,410	Sunk
16 February 1942	Opalia	United Kingdom	6,195	Damaged
3 May 1942	Ocean Venus	United Kingdom	7,174	Sunk
4 May 1942	Eclipse	United Kingdom	9,767	Damaged
5 May 1942	Delisle	United States	3,478	Damaged
8 May 1942	Ohioan	United States	6,078	Sunk
9 May 1942	Lubrafol	Panama	7,138	Sunk
14 May 1942	Potrero del Llano	Mexico	4,000	Sunk
19 July 1942	Empire Hawksbill	United Kingdom	5,724	Sunk
19 July 1942	Lavington Court	United Kingdom	5,372	Sunk
19 August 1942	British Consul	United Kingdom	6,940	Sunk
19 August 1942	Empire Cloud	United Kingdom	5,969	Sunk
30 August 1942	Vardaas	Norway	8,176	Sunk

== Bibliography ==
- Busch, Rainer; Röll, Hans-Joachim (1999). German U-boat commanders of World War II : a biographical dictionary. Translated by Brooks, Geoffrey. London, Annapolis, Md: Greenhill Books, Naval Institute Press. ISBN 1-55750-186-6.
- Busch, Rainer; Röll, Hans-Joachim (1999). Deutsche U-Boot-Verluste von September 1939 bis Mai 1945 [German U-boat losses from September 1939 to May 1945]. Der U-Boot-Krieg (in German). Vol. IV. Hamburg, Berlin, Bonn: Mittler. ISBN 3-8132-0514-2.
- Gröner, Erich; Jung, Dieter; Maass, Martin (1991). U-boats and Mine Warfare Vessels. German Warships 1815–1945. Vol. 2. Translated by Thomas, Keith; Magowan, Rachel. London: Conway Maritime Press. ISBN 0-85177-593-4.
- Paterson, Lawrence (2005). U 564 auf Feindfahrt—70 Tage an Bord [U 564 on War Patrol—70 Days on Bord] (in German). Stuttgart, Germany: Motorbuch-Verlag. ISBN 978-3-613-02528-8.
- Kemp, Paul (1999). U-Boats Destroyed - German Submarine Losses in the World Wars. London: Arms & Armour. ISBN 1-85409-515-3.
