= German submarine U-129 =

U-129 may refer to one of the following German submarines:

- SM U-129, a Type U 127 submarine laid down during the First World War but unfinished at the end of the war; broken up incomplete 1919–20
  - During the First World War, Germany also had this submarine with a similar name:
    - SM UB-129, a Type UB III submarine launched in 1918 and scuttled on 31 October 1918
- German submarine U-129 (1941), a Type IXC submarine that served in the Second World War until taken out of service on 4 July 1944; scuttled on 18 August 1944; raised and stricken in 1946; broken up. U-129 sank the Mexican tankers SS Tuxpam and SS Las Choapas in June 1942 under Captain Hans-Ludwig Witt.
