= Mexico during World War II =

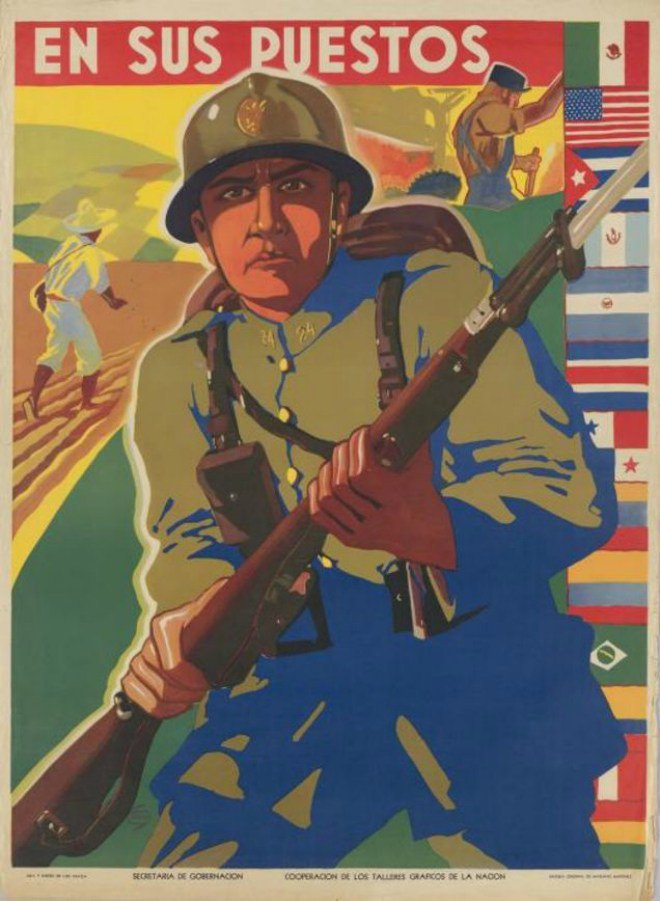
Mexican anti-Nazi propaganda featuring a soldier with the slogan "At Your Stations", and industrial and farm workers in the background.

Mexico's participation in World War II had its first antecedent in the diplomatic efforts made by the government before the League of Nations as a result of the Second Italo-Ethiopian War. However, this intensified with the sinking of oil tankers by German submarine attacks, resulting in Mexico declaring war on the Axis powers of Nazi Germany, Fascist Italy, and the Empire of Japan in May 1942. World War II had a profound influence on the country's politics and economy. Unlike most nations involved, the economic effects of the war were largely positive for Mexico.

== Background ==
Even before the beginning of the war, the Mexican government showed its disapproval of fascist nations on multiple occasions. On November 6, 1935, Mexico joined the League of Nations economic blockades against the Kingdom of Italy for the invasion and subsequent annexation of the Ethiopian Empire. A few years later, on March 19, 1938, Mexico protested before the League of Nations against the violation of Austrian sovereignty after the Anschluss, whereas the United Kingdom, France, and the United States remained silent.

The most famous case of Mexico's rejection of fascism was the recognition of the Spanish Republican government in exile. On June 17, 1939, the Mexican government withdrew its embassy from Spanish territory, leaving diplomatic affairs in the hands of the Cuban embassy. Since 1937, Spanish refugees (notably Republican supporters) had been arriving on Mexican shores and were received by the authorities in the Port of Veracruz, where ships loaded with Spaniards and some Jews persecuted in Europe by the Nazis arrived.

During this period, Mexico's diplomatic relations with democratic nations were strained. Since the oil expropriation of 1938, the United Kingdom had broken off relations, and the United States maintained a commercial blockade against Mexico. In addition, the Soviet Union had withdrawn its ambassador since the Cardenista government gave political asylum to Leon Trotsky, who was a strong opponent of Joseph Stalin's regime.

Mexico's initial neutrality in World War II was challenged by various geopolitical and economic considerations, such as its proximity to the United States, improved relations with the US as a result of President Franklin D. Roosevelt's Good Neighbor policy, and the need of the allied countries for Mexican oil for the war effort.

=== Internal social situation ===
The social situation in Mexico in the later years of the Lázaro Cárdenas presidency and the entirety of the Manuel Ávila Camacho presidency, was one of profound socio-economic inequality. By 1940, the upper class represented only 1.05% of the population, the middle class 15.87%, and the lower class 83.08%. Most of the Mexican population were farmers living in the countryside, and a working class was beginning to emerge from the emerging industrial development sector. To guarantee that there were institutions before the state that defended the interests of the workers of different sectors, various union organizations were established, including the Confederation of Mexican Workers (CTM), the Unión Sinarquista de Mexico, among others, which made up the Mexico left. The union leaders were the Communist Party of Mexico (PCM), representing the more radical left, and Vicente Lombardo Toledano and Fidel Velázquez Sánchez, representing the more moderate left.

The right wing was represented by a broad conservative and pro-clerical sector, the business sector (especially financial and industrial), and the new National Action Party (PAN), founded in 1939 by Manuel Gómez Morín. The confrontations between left and right were a constant that caused violent conflicts. However, Cárdenas was able to achieve relative social stability before the war by championing union organizations and peasants, while accommodating conservatives by postponing social reforms. This relative stability was consolidated with the oil expropriation carried out in 1938, which universally raised Cárdenas' popularity. The United States, seeing Mexico's stability, decided not to retaliate following the expropriation and reached a compensation agreement as part of the Good Neighbor policy, which would help establish post-war Pan-American cooperation.

== Beginning of the war ==
On September 1, 1939, Hitler's Germany began its invasion of Poland, marking the beginning of World War II. On September 4, President Lázaro Cárdenas, faithful to Mexico's pacifist policy, declared neutrality in the European conflict, which was seen as a new kind of war. However, neutrality did not prevent the government from condemning aggression against the sovereignty of democratic nations. Mexico recognized the Polish government-in-exile, and in December 1939, it criticized the Soviet invasion of Finland. In 1940 and 1941, Mexico condemned the German invasions of Norway, the Netherlands, Belgium, Greece and Yugoslavia. Before the German aggression against Holland and Belgium, Cárdenas declared on May 13, 1940 that:

On behalf of the Mexican nation I send my message of protest to all the countries of the world for the new outrages committed by the militarist imperialism that has attacked Belgium and Holland, without encountering any other obstacle than the heroic defense of the invaded peoples, while other countries, forgetting their responsibility, have assumed an expectant and indolent attitude.

When General Avila Camacho took office as President of Mexico in December 1940, neutrality was less firm. After the invasions of Greece and Yugoslavia in April 1941, the new president declared:

Once again, the German armies have invaded by force the territory of a neutral country, abusing its military potential. (...) For those who still think that neutrality is a guarantee of peace and salvation, the case of these two nations, small for their territory, but great for their sense of dignity and for their generous love of independence and sovereignty, should serve as an example and also as an encouragement.

In April 1941, Avila Camacho ordered the seizure of German and Italian ships in national ports; among the ships thus seized was the Italian-flagged tanker Lucifero, which would later be called Potrero del Llano. It became evident that the government of Avila Camacho maintained a "simulated neutrality"; Mexico's material support was clearly for the Allied side. Two months later, another decree was published prohibiting the export of Mexican products to countries outside the American continent. This decision primarily affected Mexican oil, whose only major buyer would then be the United States, a country with which political tension was beginning to dissipate as the U.S. arms industry now required Mexico's raw material.

On December 7, 1941, the Imperial Japanese Navy attacked Pearl Harbor, precipitating the Americans to abandon neutrality and enter the war which, from being purely European, thus became world-wide. Mexico, respecting the agreement of the Havana Conference of 1940, broke off relations with Japan and suspended all commercial exchanges with the Axis countries. This ended relations between Mexico and Germany, which had been weakening since the British commercial blockade against the Axis. Simultaneously, Mexico resumed diplomatic relations with the United Kingdom, which had been broken since the oil expropriation of 1938.

== Declaration of War ==
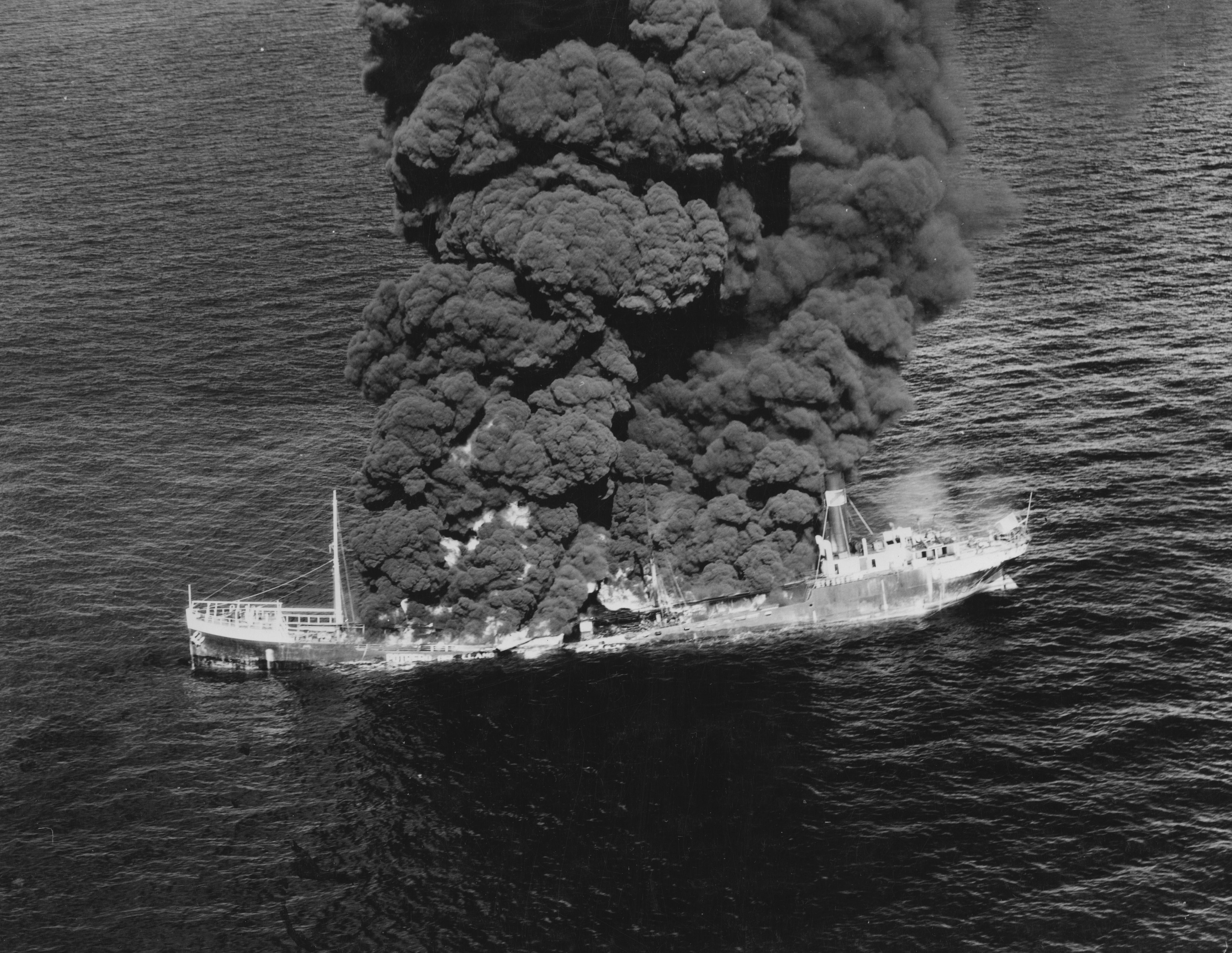
The Potrero del Llano after being torpedoed by submarine U-564. This incident caused Mexico to abandon neutrality to enter the war.

Mexico sold oil to several countries, its main client being the United States, and its ships sailed the Gulf of Mexico. Consequently, German U-boats threatened Mexican merchant ships, warning that this activity could have severe consequences.

On May 13, 1942, a German U-boat sank a Mexican oil tanker, the Potrero del Llano. The Mexican government immediately protested the aggression:

If by next Thursday, May 21, 1942, Mexico has not received from the country responsible for the aggression complete satisfaction, as well as guarantees that the indemnities for the damages suffered will be duly covered, the government of the Republic will immediately adopt the measures required by national honor.

Mexico received no response except for a new attack on May 20. Another oil tanker, the SS Faja de Oro, was sunk in the Gulf of Mexico by a German torpedo. On May 22, the president called an extraordinary session of the Congress of the Union to grant the executive the power to declare a state of war between Mexico and the Axis countries. Before the congress, Avila Camacho said the following:

The attitude that Mexico takes in the present eventuality is based on the fact that our determination stems from a need for legitimate defense. We know the limits of our military resources and we know that, given the enormity of the international masses in conflict, our role in the current conflict will not consist of extra-continental war actions, for which we are not prepared.

"Simulated neutrality" had been left behind and Mexico was explicitly on the side of the Allies as a belligerent country. Lázaro Cárdenas was appointed Secretary of Defense, the National Military Service (SMN) was created, the United States delivered armaments to improve the capacity of the Mexican army, and the properties of German, Japanese and Italian citizens were seized. Even so, Avila Camacho indicated that Mexico's role in the conflict was not on the battlefield, but to prepare his defenses and provide resources to its new allies.

Between June and September 1942 the U-Boats sank four more ships: Tuxpam, Las Choapas, Oaxaca and Amatlán. In view of this situation, the United States, under the pretext of the possibility of aggression by Japan on the coasts of the Pacific Ocean, began discreet negotiations to be allowed to install a military base on the Baja California peninsula; according to historian Humberto Musacchio, that there was speculation that he might have tried to occupy that part of Mexican territory without success.

President Avila Camacho immediately met with his cabinet, which, analyzing the situation, took precautionary measures to reinforce the surveillance and defense of the Pacific coast.

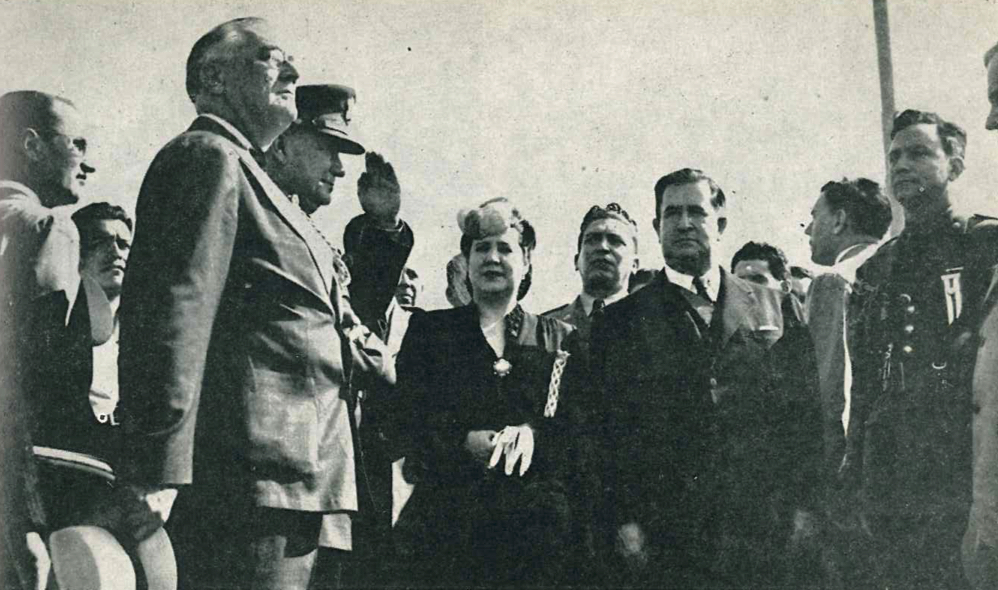
Mexico's President Manuel Ávila Camacho welcoming United States's President Franklin D. Roosevelt during the latter's visit to Mexican soil on April 20, 1943.

It was during this time period that President Roosevelt made his first visit to Mexico in April 1943, in what was an exchange visit, as President Ávila Camacho was also visiting the US. Both met in the city of Monterrey, specifically at the Palacio de Gobierno, and one of the topics covered there was Mexican participation in the war. These meetings demonstrated that never before had such a close and positive bilateral relationship been formed between the two countries, thus resolving an era of hostility that began a century ago.

== Combat participation ==
Initially, Mexican participation in the war was limited to the military defense of the coasts of Baja California, but the Allied powers pressed for Mexico to send a symbolic force to the battlefield. In 1943, due to the military situation in Europe, the Mexican government began to reconsider its refusal to participate in the war with Mexican troops there. By that time, the Allies were already on the offensive on all fronts and the possibility of a German or Japanese attack on the North American continent seemed increasingly remote. Therefore, Mexico decided to send to the war front a symbolic force to fight under the Mexican flag, providing that it would be an air force contingent in the Pacific campaign. Thus, in 1944, the 201st Squadron arrived in the United States for aviation training. A year later, in 1945, the Mexican squadron (known as the Aztec Eagles) was ready for battle; this squadron of fighter planes participated directly in the Philippines campaign alongside the United States Air Force and Royal Australian Air Force.

The 201st Squadron arrived at Majors Field in Greenville, Texas on November 30, 1944. There, the pilots received advanced training in combat air tactics, formation flying and gunnery. The men were honored with graduation ceremonies on February 20, 1945, and the squadron was presented with its battle flag. This marked the first time that Mexican troops were trained for overseas combat. In charge of the group was Colonel Antonio Cárdenas Rodríguez, and Captain First Class Radamés Gaxiola Andrade was named squadron commander.

Before leaving for the Philippines, the men received further instructions and physical examinations in Camp Stoneman in Pittsburg, California, in March 1945. The men left for the Philippines on the troop ship S.S. Fairisle on March 27, 1945. The squadron arrived in Manila on April 30, 1945, and was assigned to the Fifth Air Force's 58th Fighter Group, based at Porac, Pampanga, in the Clark Field complex on the island of Luzon.

Thus, the 201st Squadron of the Mexican Expeditionary Air Force, composed of about 300 men, 30 pilots and 25 U.S.-made P-47D Thunderbolt aircraft, fought against Imperial Japanese Army forces during the Battle of Luzon in pursuit of the liberation of the Philippines. The P-47D aircraft carried USAAF insignia but with Mexican colors on the tail rudder.

=== Pacific Theater ===
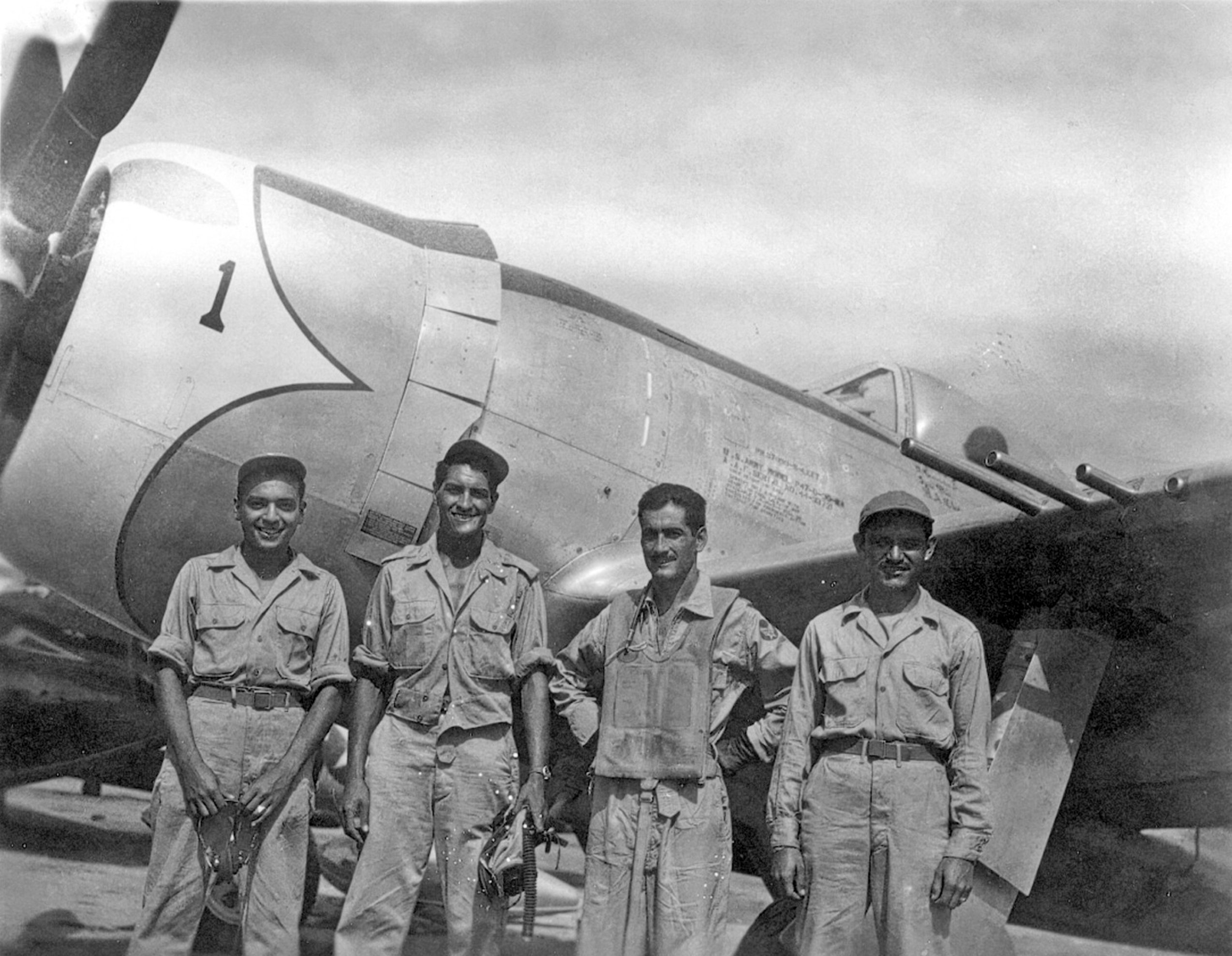
Airmen from 201st Squadron in front of a P-47D after completing a combat mission.

In June 1945, the squadron initially flew missions with the 310th Fighter Squadron, often twice a day, using borrowed U.S. aircraft. It received 25 new P-47D-30-RA aircraft in July, marked with the insignia of both the USAAF and Mexican Air Force. The squadron flew more than 90 combat missions, totaling more than 1,900 hours of flight time. It participated in the Allied effort to bomb Luzon and Formosa to push the Japanese out of those islands. It relentlessly attacked the Japanese forces concentrated mainly in Luzon and flew 53 combat missions as part of the U.S. Air Force warfare organization, was specified in the support of the 25th Infantry Division, the Philippine Army, as well as numerous Filipino guerrillas, to open up into the Cagayan valley where the squadron devastated the Japanese defenses on the ground with its bombs. Close support missions consisted mainly of attacking resistance points, apart from these they launched attacks on bases, fortifications, supply routes and machine gun pits.

During its fighting in the Philippines, five squadron pilots died (one was shot down, one crashed, and three ran out of fuel and died at sea); and three others died in accidents during training. The pilot Héctor Espinoza Galván was flying together with an American pilot but he ran out of fuel and fell into the ocean; His body was never found. Captain Pablo Ribaz Martínez and Second Lieutenant Guillermo García Ramos were surrounded by a storm, Ribaz Martínez dying while García Ramos survived after being rescued. On July 21, 1945, Second Lieutenant Mario López Portillo along with another pilot from 311th Squadron crashed into a mountain nearby, dying in the process. The casualties of these pilots would be a serious blow to 201st Squadron, meanwhile, the fifth force moved to Okinawa to continue harassment attacks on the Japanese. The Mexican Expeditionary Air Force was assigned to the service group of 311th Squadron, and on August 24, it carried out an escort mission to a convoy north of the Philippine Sea to prevent Japanese attacks. After intense fighting and losing companions, the mission had been accomplished.

The atomic bombings of the cities of Hiroshima and Nagasaki occurred on the 6th and 9th of August, 1945. Given these attacks, further losses on all fronts, and the Soviet invasion of Manchuria also on August 9, the Empire of Japan finally offered its unconditional surrender on August 15, 1945, which was formalized with a solemn signature on September 2 in Tokyo Bay. During their involvement in the war, Mexican troops were credited with putting 30,000 Japanese soldiers out of action and destroying held buildings, vehicles, tanks, anti-aircraft machine guns, emplaced machine guns, and ammunition depots. Douglas MacArthur, Supreme Command Allied Forces in Southwest Pacific Area, was impressed with the work performed by the squadron.

Years earlier, it was announced that the Mexican troops were going to combat in the European Theater. However, it was later decided that they would fight in the Philippines, since both governments maintained a close relationship based on their shared Hispanic heritage and it was believed that Mexican soldiers were strongly motivated to fight on the side of a Spanish-speaking country. On November 22, 2004, the 201st Squadron was decorated with the Philippine Legion of Honor, with the rank of Legionnaire, by then President Gloria Macapagal-Arroyo.

=== Other fronts ===
Mexico's participation in World War II was not exclusive to the 201st Squadron. Thousands of Mexicans fought on the battlefield as volunteers in foreign armies or as residents of other countries. There are figures of between 50 thousand to 80 thousand Mexicans who fought on different fronts, many of them did so voluntarily. On D-Day there were also Mexican fighters, all of whom were volunteers and born in other countries, including Luis Pérez Gómez (1922-1944), who enlisted as a pilot in the Royal Canadian Air Force, participating in various missions during the Normandy landings.

One of the most prominent Mexicans as reinforcements for other troops was José M. López, who fought alongside the American troops and his bravery in the conflict was such that after the Allied victory, he was awarded the Medal of Honor, the highest decoration in the US Army. This after his participation in the Battle of the Bulge, where he and other soldiers counterattacked the German offensive. Mendoza, with a machine gun, left almost 100 casualties to the Germans.

== Americas Theater ==
Following the declaration of war against the Axis Powers, a civilian militia known as the Mexican Guerrilla Legion (Legión de Guerrilleros Mexicanos)—popularly called the "army of charros"—was organized. It was spearheaded by revolutionary Lieutenant Colonel and charro leader Antolín Jiménez Gamas, then president of the National Association of Charros, with the approval of President Ávila Camacho.

Various press reports and secondary sources estimate that the Legion amassed between 100,000 and 150,000 volunteers, distributed across approximately 250 locations throughout the country. There, they held Sunday drills to practice discipline and basic defense tactics, leveraging the equestrian skills of the charros. The Legion never saw combat, and there is no evidence of any operational deployment. Its function was primarily symbolic, focused on civic-military organization and training, as part of the national preparations for a potential invasion of the Americas during the war.

== Return to Mexico ==
On September 25, 1945, a few weeks after the war ended, members of the FAEM unveiled a monument to their fallen comrades. The monument was designed by pilot Miguel Moreno Arreola and was built with the help of 10 elements of the Squadron. The eagle that tops the monument was made by the sculptor of Filipino origin Guillermo Tolentino. On October 12, the Squadron handed over its aircraft to the 45th Air Services Group and began preparations to return to Mexico. The members of the FAEM boarded the Sea Marlin ship on October 23, arriving on November 13 in San Pedro, California, although the first to arrive in Americas were Colonel Cárdenas Rodríguez, Lieutenant Amadeo Castro Almanza, Second Lieutenant García Ramos and Second Lieutenant José Luis Pratt Ramos, who traveled by air after meeting with General MacArthur in Tokyo, to thank him for his cooperation with the FAEM.

201st Squadron returned to Mexico City on November 18 in a military parade in the Zócalo and the subsequent presentation of the flag to the president, General Manuel Ávila Camacho, being received as heroes for battling fascism in the Pacific. The FAEM was disbanded upon his return from the Philippines. However, the rest of the Mexicans who fought in other armies were not given recognition as they did with the Squadron.

In the years following the war, many of the members have successfully moved on to other careers in life, some as leaders of civil aviation or the Mexican Army, others as businessmen, educators and engineers; five of the pilots became generals of the Mexican Air Force.

== Popular opinion ==
WW2-era propaganda poster: "We defend Liberty and fight for a better world," with portraits of Mexican historical leaders: Miguel Hidalgo y Costilla, Benito Juárez, Francisco I. Madero and Manuel Ávila Camacho.

Not all of the population supported participating in the war. A poll by the magazine Tiempo revealed that 40.7% supported Mexico's further involvement in World War II, while 59.8% opposed it. To change public opinion, the government began a propaganda campaign to justify its decision. It used Rodolfo Chacón, a survivor of the German attack on Potrero del Llano as the focal point of the propaganda.

Regarding military service, there was also division among Mexicans, provoking violent protests that led the government to exempt draftees from overseas service, which helped quell civil unrest. However, Mexican citizens living in other countries were drafted into their respective armies, resulting in high casualty rates.

The press and the popular opinion, on one side was the sympathy with the aliadophiles and on the other the germanophile current. For the former, the gazettes and newspapers in general were full of praise "with the full assurance of conquering the laurels of triumph". And in cities throughout the Republic, "darkening exercises" were carried out, in which the civilian population had to participate by turning off all sources of light, as a strategy to hinder possible bombing of the cities.

On the other hand, in the newspaper La Nación, organ of diffusion of the National Action Party, Efraín González Luna stated:

The great danger of our situation consists in the fact that on the one hand, this is a war whose direction and decision are in the hands of the great powers engaged in it for life or death, and at the same time, we do not have a repertoire of tangible objectives to mark and govern our path... no pending territorial dispute... an invasion... we do not even have a common border with enemy countries.... We run the risk of entering into a rather ideological war of solidarity with the United States of America.... Under these conditions we are seriously exposed to a deadly annulment of our national personality.

Nonetheless, labour leader and head of the Mexican left Vicente Lombardo Toledano supported the allied cause in the tribunes and advised the president not to take refuge in prudence because the time had come for the country to honor its traditions. The idea of national unity prevailed, and 1942 was declared the "Year of Effort", with the multiplication in all the media of allusive messages always accompanied by a Mexican flag such as:

Mexican: think of your country and work for it,

The Americas United, united we will win,

We are at War, Spirit of Victory,

The radio constantly broadcast war reports and allusive radio soap operas: Contraespionaje, Las ideas no se matan. Agustín Lara premiered his Cantar del Regimiento and the cinema achieved resounding successes: ¡Mexicanos al Grito de Guerra! by Álvaro Gálvez y Fuentes, La Isla de la Pasión and Soy puro mexicano by Emilio Fernández.

== Aftermath ==
=== Political ===
When the Allies achieved victory, Mexico was among the victors, despite only actively sending soldiers in the last year of the conflict. Therefore, the country was a founding member of the United Nations Organization, unlike the founding of the League of Nations in 1919, where it was not invited because it had remained neutral during the First World War. In the international arena, Mexico was more present, taking part in the Dumbarton Oaks Conference, the Treaty of San Francisco, the Bretton Woods Conference, and managed to have its initiative approved so that the dictatorship of Francisco Franco in Spain would not be recognized or admitted as a legitimate government before the UN, because it had been formed with the military aid of Nazi Germany and Fascist Italy.

=== Economic ===
Mexico's geographic position and the global crisis the world was facing placed the country in a strategic role for the supply and security of its northern neighbors, Canada and the United States. The U.S. labor force was insufficiently large and international trade was hampered, while Mexico had strong bargaining power with the U.S. and began producing products that it had previously imported. The country had natural resources indispensable for the war industry, such as copper, zinc, graphite, minerals, silver, cattle, beer and agricultural products, which increased its exports and stimulated its development.

Between 1939 and 1945, Mexico's domestic product grew by 10% and the Mexican Social Security Institute (IMSS) was founded. The economic benefits of the war also brought Mexico closer to the United States. During this period Mexico became increasingly aligned with the Western Bloc, resulting in more distant relations with a number of Latin American countries. Mexico's post-war circumstances were favorable for industrialization. The conditions that allowed the accelerated growth of the economy contributed to the emergence of the import substitution model that Mexico maintained for several decades after the end of the war. Economically, Mexico's actions in World War II cost the country approximately three million dollars.

=== Bracero Program ===
The entry of U.S. troops into the war caused an intense increase in its industrial and agricultural production. However, the departure of U.S. soldiers left little labor for its economy; the remaining U.S. labor force was insufficient to meet the demands of the countryside and industry. Mexico and the United States signed an agreement in 1942 to regulate the flow of Mexican migrants (braceros) to the United States and compensate for the lack of U.S. workers. The agreement resulted in the Bracero Program. It established that braceros could not be employed in military service, could not suffer acts of discrimination, could not be used to displace U.S. workers, and that their basic needs had to be assured. The Bracero Program remained in effect until 1964 and benefited neighboring countries, securing needed labor for the United States and reducing unemployment in Mexico.

=== Film industry ===
During the war, Mexican cinema and, to a lesser extent, music and radio, experienced significant growth. The war in Europe made producing films on the continent increasingly difficult, which motivated their transfer to Mexican forums and studios such as the Estudios Churubusco and Azteca Studios in Mexico City and the deserts of Durango. Moreover, the mobilization of Hollywood stars on the war fronts forced the film industry to use Mexican actors. Aided by a slowdown of U.S. film production during the war, Mexican cinema spread throughout the world, where it left a permanent mark.

Mexican cinema continued to produce high-quality works and began to explore other genres such as comedy, romance and musical. In 1943, the film Wild Flower brought together filmmaker Emilio Fernández, photographer Gabriel Figueroa, actor Pedro Armendariz and actress Dolores del Río. The films María Candelaria (1943) and The Pearl (1947), were considered pivotal works by Fernández and his team, and gave Mexican cinema international prestige, with their works being shown worldwide at major film festivals. In 1946, María Candelaria won the Palme d'Or at the Cannes Film Festival. In 1949, The Pearl won the Golden Globe for Best Cinematography, becoming the first Spanish-language film to receive such recognition.

== See also ==
- Mexico in World War I
