= SS Tuxpam =

SS Tuxpam can refer to

- SS Flying Lark, a banana boat built in 1915 and named Tuxpam 1934–38
- SS Tuxpam (1944), a dredger built as SS Empire Clydesdale in 1944 and named Tuxpam 1946–70
- SS Tuxpam (Mexican oil tanker), a Mexican oil tanker, ex-SS Prometheus, sunk on 27 June 1942 by U-129.
