= Nigel de Grey =

British codebreaker

Nigel de Grey CMG OBE (27 March 1886 – 25 May 1951) was a British codebreaker. Son of the rector of Copdock, Suffolk, and grandson of the 5th Lord Walsingham on his father's side and Spencer Ponsonby-Fane on his mother's, he was educated at Eton College and became fluent in French and German. In 1907 he joined the publishing firm of William Heinemann. As he was shy and physically small, a colleague labelled him "the dormouse".

== World War I ==
Nigel de Grey joined the Royal Naval Volunteer Reserve and served in Belgium. In September 1915 he was transferred to Naval Intelligence Division, Room 40 codebreaking section. He, Dilly Knox and Reverend William Montgomery decrypted the Zimmermann Telegram on 17 January 1917. The Zimmermann Telegram was from the German foreign secretary Arthur Zimmermann to the German ambassador Heinrich von Eckardt in Mexico, telling him to offer the Mexican government the return of the states of Arizona, Texas and New Mexico as an inducement to Mexico to side with Germany against the United States. The public disclosure of this secret Mexican-German pact brought the US into World War I. Later in 1917, de Grey was promoted, assigned to run the NID's Mediterranean section in Rome, to liaise with the director of Italian naval intelligence and to focus on Austrian cipher traffic.

== World War II ==
In World War II Nigel de Grey was assigned to the Government Code and Cypher School (GC&CS) at Bletchley Park, where he concentrated on German traffic encrypted on the Enigma cipher machine. In September 1941 he provided a report to the Prime Minister with the first references from German authorities to their own police battalions systematically levelling villages and removing their populations. One signal boasted of 30,000 executions "in the central area". Following a warning made in a speech to parliament by Churchill, a German circular in October 1941 cautioned that no further references to "sensitive operations" should be made on wireless channels. The intelligence collected by De Grey from the German Domino cypher later played an indirect role in building the evidence case at the Nuremberg Trials.

After World War II de Grey remained with GC&CS, which became GCHQ in 1946. Eventually he became a deputy director and led a team working on Soviet cable traffic. He retired in 1951 and died a very short time later of a heart-attack in Piccadilly, London. His wife, whom he married in 1910, survived him.
