= Cadmus (ship) =

Several vessels have been named Cadmus.

== Cadmus (1813 ship) ==
Cadmus (1813 ship) was launched in 1813 at Sunderland. She traded with the East Indies under license from the British East India Company (EIC) until 1827. Then between 1827 and 1834 she made two voyages as a whaler in the British southern whale fishery. She was lost in 1835.

== Cadmus (1816 ship) ==
Cadmus (1816 ship) was built in 1816 at Medford, Massachusetts. She made five complete voyages as a whaler, one out of Boston (1822–1825), and four out of Fairhaven, Massachusetts (1831–1841). She was lost in 1842 on an uncharted atoll in the Tuamotu Archipelago.

== Cadmus (1818 ship) ==
Cadmus (1818 ship) was built in 1818 in New York. She was a packet sailing between New York and Havre. In 1824, Cadmus carried General Lafayette to New York on a visit at the invitation of the U.S. Congress. From 1827, Cadmus became a whaler, sailing from Sag Harbor, New York. She made 17 complete whaling voyages. During her whaling years Cadmus brought in oil and whale bone worth a total of $359,000. In 1849, a new owner sailed her to California so that he and his crew could take part in the gold rush there. They abandoned her in San Francisco, where she became a storehouse until she became too leaky; her bones were eventually buried under fill.

== Cadmus (1836 ship) ==
Cadmus, of 115 (schooner), or 130 (brig) tons (bm), was launched in 1836, at Essex, Massachusetts. Captain Samuel Soper purchased her from Marblehead in 1844. From 1845 to 1852 she made six voyages as a whaler. She was withdrawn from service in 1852.

== SS Cadmus (1911) ==
SS Cadmus was a cargo ship of 1,879 GRT built in 1911 by Shipbuilding & Drydock Co. Ltd., West Hartlepool, for John Gaff & Co., of Glasgow and Sydney. In 1915 Christian Salvesen & Co. of Leith purchased her. During the war she was armed with a 12-pounder gun on her poop deck. On 18 October 1917, she was on her way from Dunkirk to Blythe with a cargo of 900 tons of spent cartridge cases from 18-pounder guns for recycling. SM UC-47 torpedoed and sank her in the North Sea 20 nautical miles (37 km) south by east of Flamborough Head (53°50′55″N 00°12′27″E). Her 22 crew members survived. In March 1918, the Ministry of Shipping awarded Salvesen £83,000 for the loss of their vessel.

== D/S Cadmus (1926) ==
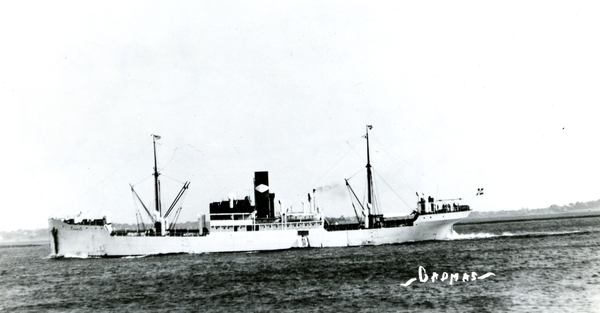
D/S Cadmus

Cadmus, of 1,855 GRT, was launched in 1926 by Kjøbenhavns Flydedok & Skibsværft, Copenhagen, and was owned by L. Harboe Jensen & Co, Oslo. They chartered her to the United Fruit Company. She was sailing from Tela, Honduras to Galveston with a cargo of bananas, when on 1 July 1942, the German submarine U-129 torpedoed her at 22°50′N 92°30′W. Two crew members were killed; several were injured. Twenty crew members survived in two boats and five days later landed near Texpan, Mexico.

== See also ==
- HMS Cadmus – any one of four vessels of the British Royal Navy
- USS Cadmus (AR-14)
