= William Montgomery (cryptographer) =

British Presbyterian minister and cryptographer (1871–1930)

- Born: 1871; Liverpool
- Died: 7 October 1930 (aged 59); Chelsea
- Education: University of London; St John's College, Cambridge
- Known for: Zimmermann Telegram
- Spouse: Marta Corbett
- Children: Elizabeth Montgomery

Rev. William Montgomery (1871–1930) was a Presbyterian minister and a British codebreaker who worked in Room 40 during World War I.

Montgomery and Nigel de Grey deciphered the Zimmermann Telegram, which helped bring the U.S. into World War I. At this time (1917), Montgomery was 45.

He was an authority on Augustine of Hippo and a translator of theological works from German. No work, it was said, had ever been so idiomatically and yet so faithfully rendered as his translation of Albert Schweitzer's Quest of the Historical Jesus, published in 1914.
