= Mexico in World War I =

Involvement of Mexico in the First World War

Mexico was a neutral country in World War I, which lasted from 1914 to 1918. The war broke out in Europe in August 1914 as the Mexican Revolution was in the midst of full-scale civil war between factions that had helped oust General Victoriano Huerta from the presidency earlier that year. The Constitutionalist Army of Venustiano Carranza under the generalship of Alvaro Obregón defeated the army of Pancho Villa in the Battle of Celaya in April 1915.

== Background ==
After the Battle of Celaya in April 1915, the violence in Mexico was largely restricted to local fights, especially guerrilla fights in Morelos under the leadership of Emiliano Zapata. The partial peace allowed a new Mexican Constitution to be drafted in 1916 and proclaimed on February 5, 1917. Foreign oil companies felt threatened by the new constitution, which empowered the Mexican government to expropriate natural resources deemed vital to the nation. Mexico was in constant threat of being invaded by the U.S., which wanted to take control of Tehuantepec Isthmus and Tampico oil fields. Germany made several attempts to incite a war between Mexico and the U.S., seen especially in the Zimmermann Telegram affair in January 1917, where the aim was to draw the U.S. into conflict on its southern border rather than join Great Britain and France in the conflict against Germany and its allies.

=== Economic impact ===
World War I had a major impact on Mexico's trade, especially with European nations. The war disrupted global commerce, with British and German naval blockades affecting Mexico's ability to trade with these countries. The British blockade restricted trade with Germany, while Germany responded by using submarines to attack Allied ships. This made it difficult for Mexico to continue trading with Germany, with direct commerce nearly coming to a halt.

=== Trade with Britain and France ===
Despite the blockades, Mexico was still able to trade with Britain, which remained one of its main buyers. Mexico's oil exports, essential for fueling British military operations, became especially important. Oil made up about 63% of Mexico's exports to Britain from 1914 to 1919, and by 1918, it accounted for nearly all of Mexico's exports to Britain, reaching 99. Mexico's trade with France was smaller but still significant, consisting mostly of coffee, fruits, and minerals. However, the scale of these imports was not as large as Britain's demand for Mexican oil. As Germany was blocked from direct trade with Mexico, some German goods were rerouted through Spain, often disguised as coming from neutral countries. German companies in Mexico, like the Böker company, continued to operate under strict supervision by U.S. and British authorities, who were concerned about German influence in Latin America.

=== Shift in trade to Argentina ===
With the disruption of European trade, Mexico turned to other markets, particularly Argentina, which grew in importance as a trade partner during the war. From 1915 onward, Mexican exports to Argentina increased. These exports included oil and henequen, a fiber used in grain storage. This shift in exports helped Mexico balance the loss of European markets to some extent.

=== Decline in exports and economic strain ===
While the war created new trade opportunities, it also caused problems for Mexico's overall economy. Mexican exports fell during the early years of the war, a trend seen across Latin America. About 45% of the decline in Mexico's exports was directly due to the war, while the other 55% was a result of domestic factors, such as the aftermath of the Mexican Revolution. However, a temporary boom in exports of raw materials, including silver, copper, and oil, created an appearance of economic growth, although some historians claim much of this boom was driven by inflation rather than real growth. By 1918, the prices of imports had risen faster than the prices of Mexican exports, leading to a decline in the terms of trade. This trend continued after the war, and by 1921, the terms of trade had fallen by 39% compared to the pre-war period. As a result, Mexico's national income decreased, which could only have been offset by improvements in productivity which was unlikely during the Mexican Revolution.

== Relationship with the United States ==
Mexican neutrality in the Great War reflected a hostility toward the U.S., due to several earlier U.S. interventions in Mexico. In February 1913, Victoriano Huerta had conspired with the U.S. ambassador Henry Lane Wilson to oust Francisco I. Madero from the presidency of Mexico. The coup d'état was the culmination of violence in Mexico City, known as the Ten Tragic Days (La decena trágica), in the waning days of the William Howard Taft presidency. President Woodrow Wilson also ordered the invasion of Veracruz in 1914, resulting in the death of 170 Mexican soldiers and an unknown number of civilians.

The relationship between Woodrow Wilson and Venustiano Carranza, whose political position had been aided by U.S. recognition in October 1915, allowing U.S. arms sales to Carranza's faction against its main rival General Pancho Villa, was initially cordial. Villa retaliated against arms dealers in Columbus, New Mexico because he had been sold faulty weapons and powder that resulted in the death of his men in battle. In the 1916 attack, 17 Americans were killed when they would not return their money or supply replacement weapons. Although it occurred on American soil, it was not an attack on the US government, however the media reported differently. Wilson sent U.S. Army General John J. Pershing into Mexico for punitive action to capture Villa. The Pancho Villa Expedition destroyed Villa's militia but failed to capture Villa himself. The expedition stalled and Carranza, a strong nationalist, demanded Pershing's withdrawal from Mexican soil. Wilson complied and the expedition was ended.

U.S. interests were threatened by the proclamation of the Mexican Constitution of 1917 and Mexico was in constant threat of being invaded by the U.S. Capturing Villa proved to be a challenge as Villa's forces used guerrilla warfare on Pershing's men, with most of the fighting being done on horseback.

Lieutenant George S. Patton served as an aide to General Pershing during the expedition to Mexico. Rather than using horses to combat Villa's men, Patton turned to technology for a better solution. Pershing brought three Dodge touring cars made to handle the terrain in Mexico. The alternative Patton sought was invented when he strapped a machine gun to each Dodge car. Pershing gave Patton a field command and got the opportunity to use his innovation. With time he got his chance when he heard Pancho Villa's second in command Julio Cardenas was staying in a ranch named San Miguelito visiting relatives at Rubio, Chihuahua along with two more of Villa's men.

On May 14, 1916, after scouting the area Patton brought along a handful of men and positioned them on the northwest and southwest ends of the house to cut off their escape while Patton approached the house on the east. Three of Villa's men including Cardenas spotted Patton and attempted to escape with their horses and arms by going out the front gate heading southwest only to get cut off by Patton's men. The three men tried to escape in the other direction, but the speed of the cavalry was no match for the speed of the Dodge cars with the machine gun fire. The first motorized attack in American history became a success as all three of Villa's men were killed including Julio Cardenas. It is unknown if Patton single handedly killed any of these men, but Patton was launched into popularity with his success promoting him to First Lieutenant. With Patton's achievement launching to stardom, the stage was set for his involvement in fighting with General John J. Pershing on the western front in WWI.

== Extent of involvement in the war ==
These facts marked the participation of Mexico in the Great War.

- Victoriano Huerta was the dictatorial president of Mexico from 1913 to 1914, in which his rule was both inefficient and severely repressive. Huerta established a military dictatorship and dissolved the legislature by eliminating his enemies, dissolving congress, and going against the oil interests of the U.S. government. Almost immediately, Huerta was met with opposition by multiple people, one of them being Venustiano Carranza. Carranza worked alongside others who opposed Huerta, such as newly elected president Woodrow Wilson. After Huerta was defeated by these forces, Carranza took office.
- Carranza was the first president of the new Mexican Republic. He opposed the changes that came with the revolution, specifically its social aspects. He opposed the occupation of Veracruz, even when it was aimed at his enemy, Huerta. He was a nationalist who was involved with controversies with the U.S., as he attempted to bring oil under Mexican rule.
- The Carranza government was de jure recognized by Germany at the beginning of 1917 and by the U.S. on August 31, 1917, the latter as a direct consequence of the Zimmermann telegram in an effort to ensure Mexican Neutrality in the Great War. Mexico's decision to remain neutral during World War I was for multiple reasons. These reasons included Mexico engaging in its own civil war, its outdated military, Germany's promises of financial support being unreliable, and the high likelihood of the U.S. supporting Carranza's rivals if Mexico had joined.
- After the occupation of Veracruz in 1914, Mexico was unwilling to participate militarily alongside the U.S., maintaining Mexican neutrality was the best the U.S. could hope for.
- Carranza granted guarantees to German companies for keeping their operations open, specifically in Mexico City, but he was at the same time selling oil to the British fleet. In fact, 75 percent of the fuel used by the Royal Navy came from Mexico. There was a pre-war reluctance by the British to rely on Mexico's oil sources due to political unreliability from Wilson's interactions with Huerta.
- Carranza rejected the proposal of a military alliance with Germany, made via the Zimmermann Telegram, and he was at the same time able to prevent a permanent military invasion from the U.S., which wanted to take control of Tehuantepec Isthmus and Tampico oil fields. Mexico was producing 55 million barrels of petroleum by 1917. Carranza gave the order to destroy and set fire to the oil fields in case of a U.S. invasion. The Mexican oil industry was a vital source of wealth, and Carranza believed that controlling it was crucial for political stability in Mexico. With destroying the oil fields, it acted as a strategic move to deny the U.S. military. The relationship between the United States and Mexico in attempting to invest in this oil was made particularly crucial by World War I, as it played a significant part in the Mexican Revolution and Mexico's neutrality.
- Carranza's troops confronted and defeated John J. Pershing in the Battle of Carrizal. General Pershing was furious at this result and asked for permission to attack the Carrancista Garrison at Chihuahua. President Wilson, fearing that such an attack would provoke a full-scale war with Mexico, refused. The Battle of Carrizal marked the effective end of the Punitive Expedition.

== See also ==
- Mexico in World War II

== Sources ==
- Mexico and the United States in the oil controversy, 1917–1942. University of Texas Press, 1977
- Threats of Intervention: US-Mexican Relations, 1917–1923. iUniverse, 2000.
- Básicos. Historia Universal 2, Ed. Santillana, 2007
- Historia de México II, Ed, Santillana, 2008
- The Politics of Property Rights : Political Inestability, Credible Commitments, and Economic Growth in Mexico, 1876-1929.
- Young Patron, America's storied general began his fighting career in an Old West shootout with Pancho Villa's riders. 2006
- Woodrow Wilson, Victoriano Huerta, and the Recognition Issue in Mexico, 1984
- Nationalism and Class Conflict in Mexico in 1910-1920, 1987
- Oil and the Mexican Revolution: The Southwestern Connection, 1987
