= Heinrich von Eckardt =

German diplomat (1861–1944)

Heinrich von Eckardt (20 July 1861, in Riga, Russian Empire – 3 March 1944, in Jena, Germany) was a Baltic German diplomat in the service of the German Empire.

== Life and work ==
After studying jurisprudence at the University of Jena from 1881 to 1885, Eckardt went to Istanbul in 1886, as a member of the German diplomatic service. From 1899 he was posted to Tehran, Belgrade, Athens, Havana (1908 – 1910) and Cetinje (1911 – 1914).

During the First World War, Eckardt was Resident Minister for the German Empire in Mexico, taking up the appointment in 1914 and holding it until 1918. After the departure of the German supported President Victoriano Huerta in 1914, German sentiment towards the new President, Venustiano Carranza, was significantly negative; Eckardt believed Carranza's government ministries were "prototypes of vulgarity and depravity". His attitude towards the president remained bitter, despite attempts by Carranza to suppress anti-German publications, which he described as "pedant mediocrity".

== Zimmermann Telegram ==
Eckardt is known for being the recipient of the Zimmermann Telegram, a telegram sent by German Foreign Secretary Arthur Zimmermann on January 16, 1917. The message was first sent to the German ambassador to the United States, Johann von Bernstorff, to deter interception, and he relayed it to Eckardt on January 19. However, the telegram was intercepted by the British on its way from Bernstorff to Eckardt and was decoded by Room 40. In the telegram, Zimmermann instructed Eckardt to approach President Venustiano Carranza with a proposition in two parts: firstly, to form an alliance with Germany, and secondly, should Germany drop its neutrality against the United States, to join Germany in attacking the U.S. and to help persuade Japan into aiding them with the attack. The telegram was left vague and Eckardt was told to work out the details himself as he presented them to Carranza. He was also asked to call Carranza's attention to the Battle of the Atlantic and the possibility that it may further attempts to compel the British into peace.

Despite the discovery of the telegram by the United States and Britain, Eckardt approached Foreign Secretary Cándido Aguilar and gave him the proposal a month after the message was sent. Aguilar was sympathetic, but both he and Carranza eventually turned Germany down, mainly due to the premature release. Mexico feared American influence, though, and Eckardt was somewhat able to sway Carranza, who ordered pro-Allied newspapers to reverse their stance. These German-centric reports initially led Eckardt to believe the armistice was a propagandic myth. Further confusion resulted in a Guadalajaran newspaper overlapping pro-German sentiment with Eckardt's instructions for pro-Carranza reports when Carranza's anticlericalism caused the newspaper to criticise the Catholic Church, leading to the church's boycott and Eckardt's unsuccessful attempts to coax them out of it.

Eckardt was previously the German ambassador to the Kingdom of Montenegro during the Balkan Wars. He was present on April 27, 1913 when Austria demanded to King Nicholas that Montenegro return Scutari to Albania.
