= German submarine U-129 (1941) =

German World War II submarine

Coordinates: 10.000°N 35.583°W

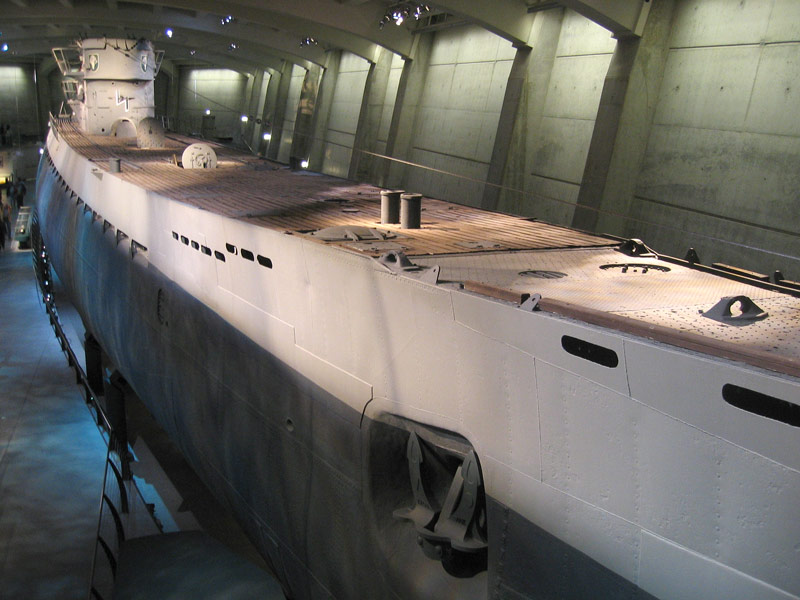
- U-505, a typical Type IXC boat

History

Nazi Germany
- Name: U-129
- Ordered: 7 August 1939
- Builder: DeSchiMAG AG Weser in Bremen
- Yard number: 992
- Laid down: 30 July 1940
- Launched: 28 February 1941
- Commissioned: 21 May 1941
- Fate: Taken out of service at Lorient 4 July 1944; scuttled on 18 August, raised and broken up, 1946

General characteristics
- Class & type: Type IXC submarine
- Displacement: 1,120 t (1,100 long tons) surfaced; 1,232 t (1,213 long tons) submerged
- Length: 76.76 m (251 ft 10 in) o/a; 58.75 m (192 ft 9 in) pressure hull
- Beam: 6.76 m (22 ft 2 in) o/a; 4.40 m (14 ft 5 in) pressure hull
- Height: 9.60 m (31 ft 6 in)
- Draught: 4.70 m (15 ft 5 in)
- Installed power: 4,400 PS (3,200 kW; 4,300 bhp) (diesels); 1,000 PS (740 kW; 990 shp) (electric)
- Propulsion: 2 shafts; 2 × diesel engines; 2 × electric motors
- Speed: 18.3 knots (33.9 km/h; 21.1 mph) surfaced; 7.3 knots (13.5 km/h; 8.4 mph) submerged
- Range: 13,450 nmi (24,910 km; 15,480 mi) at 10 knots (19 km/h; 12 mph) surfaced; 64 nmi (119 km; 74 mi) at 4 knots (7.4 km/h; 4.6 mph) submerged
- Test depth: 230 m (750 ft)
- Complement: 4 officers, 44 enlisted48 to 56
- Armament: 6 × torpedo tubes (4 bow, 2 stern); 22 × 53.3 cm (21 in) torpedoes; 1 × 10.5 cm (4.1 in) SK C/32 deck gun (180 rounds); 1 × 3.7 cm (1.5 in) SK C/30 AA gun; 1 × twin 2 cm FlaK 30 AA guns

Service record
- Part of: 4th U-boat Flotilla; 21 May – 30 June 1941; 2nd U-boat Flotilla; 1 July 1941
- Identification codes: M 41 124
- Commanders: Kptlt. Nicolai Clausen; 21 May 1941 – 13 May 1942; K.Kapt. Hans Witt; 14 May 1942 – 8 July 1943; Oblt.z.S. Richard von Harpe; 12 July 1943 – 19 July 1944
- Operations: 10 patrols: 1st patrol: 3 – 30 August 1941; 2nd patrol: 27 September – 8 October 1941; 3rd patrol: 21 October 1941 – 28 December 1941; 4th patrol: 25 January – 5 April 1942; 5th patrol: 20 May – 21 August 1942; 6th patrol: 28 September 1942 – 6 January 1943; 7th patrol: 11 March – 29 May 1943; 8th patrol: 27 July – 9 September 1943; 9th patrol: a. 9 – 11 October 1943; b. 12 October 1943 – 31 January 1944; 10th patrol: 22 March – 19 July 1944
- Victories: 29 merchant ships sunk (143,748 GRT)

German submarine U-129 was a Type IXC U-boat of Nazi Germany's Kriegsmarine during World War II. It was laid down at the AG Weser yard, Bremen as yard number 992 on 30 July 1940, launched on 28 February 1941 and was commissioned on 21 May with Kapitänleutnant Nicolai Clausen in command.

Its service life began with training in the 4th U-boat Flotilla; she moved to the 2nd Flotilla for operations on 1 July 1941.

It sank 29 ships, a total of 143,748 gross register tons (GRT), on ten patrols.

== Design ==
German Type IXC submarines were slightly larger than the original Type IXBs. U-129 had a displacement of 1,120 tonnes (1,100 long tons) when at the surface and 1,232 tonnes (1,213 long tons) while submerged. The U-boat had a total length of 76.76 m (251 ft 10 in), a pressure hull length of 58.75 m (192 ft 9 in), a beam of 6.76 m (22 ft 2 in), a height of 9.60 m (31 ft 6 in), and a draught of 4.70 m (15 ft 5 in). The submarine was powered by two MAN M 9 V 40/46 supercharged four-stroke, nine-cylinder diesel engines producing a total of 4,400 metric horsepower (3,240 kW; 4,340 shp) for use while surfaced, two Siemens-Schuckert 2 GU 345/34 double-acting electric motors producing a total of 1,000 metric horsepower (740 kW; 990 shp) for use while submerged. She had two shafts and two 1.92 m (6 ft) propellers. The boat was capable of operating at depths of up to 230 metres (750 ft).

The submarine had a maximum surface speed of 18.3 knots (33.9 km/h; 21.1 mph) and a maximum submerged speed of 7.3 knots (13.5 km/h; 8.4 mph). When submerged, the boat could operate for 63 nautical miles (117 km; 72 mi) at 4 knots (7.4 km/h; 4.6 mph); when surfaced, she could travel 13,450 nautical miles (24,910 km; 15,480 mi) at 10 knots (19 km/h; 12 mph). U-129 was fitted with six 53.3 cm (21 in) torpedo tubes (four fitted at the bow and two at the stern), 22 torpedoes, one 10.5 cm (4.13 in) SK C/32 naval gun, 180 rounds, and a 3.7 cm (1.5 in) SK C/30 as well as a 2 cm (0.79 in) C/30 anti-aircraft gun. The boat had a complement of forty-eight.

== Service history ==
It made the short journey from Kiel, arriving in Horten Naval Base in Norway on 24 July 1941.

=== First, second and third patrols ===
The boat's first patrol involved her departure from Horten, crossing the North Sea and entering the Atlantic Ocean by passing close to the Faroe Islands on the Icelandic side. It arrived at Lorient (where she would be based for most of her career), in occupied France on 30 August 1941.

Its second sortie saw its cross the Bay of Biscay to a point north of the Azores.

Its third patrol was further south, as far south as a similar latitude to Rio de Janeiro, but success continued to elude it.

=== Fourth patrol ===
Things improved dramatically when as part of Operation Drumbeat, it attacked Nordvangen on 20 February; this ship sank in one minute northeast of Trinidad. Staying in the West Indies / northern South America region, it sank another six vessels.

1926 D/S Cadmus (UKJ101192601) Torpedoed and sunk 01/07 by the German submarine U 129 (Kapitänleutnant Hans Ludwig Witt) in position 22.50N-92.30W while on a voyage from Tela, Honduras to Galveston, TX, USA with bananas. Two men lost. Captain Alfred Stenersen and the survivors abandoned into 2 life boats. They landed 06/07 about 60 nm south of Texpan, Mexico.

1927 MS GUNDERSEN (UKJ101192702) Departed Tela, Honduras 29/06 with 16.255 banana stems for Galveston, TX, USA. Torpedoed 01/07 by the German submarine U-129 (Kapitänleutnant Hans-Ludwig Witt) in position 23.33N-92.35V in the Gulf of Mexico. 22 were saved by Norwegian SS DEA, but an English messboy died, probably during the explosion. GUNDERSEN caught fire and sank within the next 45 minutes.

=== Fifth and sixth patrols ===
The submarine returned to its sunshine haunts; included in the toll was Hardwicke Grange, which was sunk with torpedoes and the deck gun north of Puerto Rico on 12 June 1942. It also sank Millinocket on 17 June off La Isabela, Cuba and a ship from the Soviet Union, Tuapse, in the Gulf of Mexico on 4 July.

Its sixth patrol included the sinking of Trafalgar about 1,100 nmi (2,000 km; 1,300 mi) northeast of Guadeloupe on 16 October 1942 and West Kebar some 350 nmi (650 km; 400 mi) northeast of Barbados.

=== Seventh, eighth and ninth patrols ===
Patrol number seven saw ships such as the Melbourne Star and Panam consigned to the deep. On the return journey U129 was refuelling from the 'milk cow' supply submarine U-459 when two men were swept overboard. One was recovered fairly swiftly but the other could not be found. Her eighth patrol was west of the Canary Islands and produced no results.

U-129's ninth patrol was divided into two; she departed Lorient on 9 October 1943, but put into Saint-Nazaire on the 11th. A day later she headed for the US east coast, sinking Libertad on 4 December off North Carolina.

=== Tenth patrol ===
The boat began her last operation which at 111 days, was her longest, on 22 March 1944. Steaming south, she encountered Anadyr about 600 nmi (1,100 km; 690 mi) south southeast of Recife in Brazil and sank her.

=== Fate ===
The boat was taken out of service at Lorient 4 July 1944; she was scuttled on 18 August. She was raised and broken up in 1946.

== Summary of raiding history ==
Date	Name	Nationality	Tonnage	Fate
20 February 1942	Nordvangen	Norway	2,400	Sunk
23 February 1942	George L. Torian	Canada	1,754	Sunk
23 February 1942	Lennox	Canada	1,904	Sunk
23 February 1942	West Zeda	United States	5,658	Sunk
28 February 1942	Bayou	Panama	2,605	Sunk
3 March 1942	Mary	United States	5,104	Sunk
7 March 1942	Steel Age	United States	6,188	Sunk
10 June 1942	L. A. Christensen	Norway	4,362	Sunk
12 June 1942	Hardwick Grange	United Kingdom	9,005	Sunk
17 June 1942	Millinrocket	United States	3,274	Sunk
27 June 1942	Las Choapas	Mexico	2,005	Sunk
27 June 1942	Tuxpam	Mexico	7,008	Sunk
1 July 1942	Cadmus	Norway	1,855	Sunk
2 July 1942	Gundersen	Norway	1,841	Sunk
4 July 1942	Tuapse	Soviet Union	6,320	Sunk
12 July 1942	Tachirá	United States	2,325	Sunk
19 July 1942	Port Antonio	Norway	1,266	Sunk
23 July 1942	Onondaga	United States	2,309	Sunk
16 October 1942	Trafalgar	Norway	5,542	Sunk
23 October 1942	Reuben Tipton	United States	6,829	Sunk
30 October 1942	West Kebar	United States	5,620	Sunk
5 November 1942	Astrell	Norway	7,595	Sunk
5 November 1942	Meton	United States	7,027	Sunk
2 April 1943	Melbourne Star	United Kingdom	12,806	Sunk
24 April 1943	Santa Catalina	United States	6,507	Sunk
4 May 1943	Panam	Panama	7,277	Sunk
4 December 1943	Libertad	Cuba	5,441	Sunk
6 May 1944	Anadyr	United Kingdom	5,278	Sunk
11 May 1944	Empire Heath	United Kingdom	6,643	Sunk

== Bibliography ==
- Busch, Rainer; Röll, Hans-Joachim (1999). German U-boat commanders of World War II : a biographical dictionary. Translated by Brooks, Geoffrey. London, Annapolis, Md: Greenhill Books, Naval Institute Press. ISBN 1-55750-186-6.
- Busch, Rainer; Röll, Hans-Joachim (1999). Deutsche U-Boot-Verluste von September 1939 bis Mai 1945 [German U-boat losses from September 1939 to May 1945]. Der U-Boot-Krieg (in German). Vol. IV. Hamburg; Berlin; Bonn: Mittler. ISBN 3-8132-0514-2.
- Gröner, Erich; Jung, Dieter; Maass, Martin (1991). U-boats and Mine Warfare Vessels. German Warships 1815–1945. Vol. 2. Translated by Thomas, Keith; Magowan, Rachel. London: Conway Maritime Press. ISBN 0-85177-593-4.
