= SS Tuxpam (1903) =

Oil tanker

Coordinates: 20°15′N 96°20′W

History
- Name: Prometheus (1903–1914); Cushing (1914–1918,1919–1924); USS Chinampa (1918–1919); Americano (1924–1941); Tuxpam (1941–1942)
- Owner: Deutsch-Amerikanische Petroleum GmbH, Hamburg (1903–1914); Standard Oil of New Jersey (1914–1924); Cia Nav. Cisterna SA, Genoa (1924–1937); Ditta G.M. Barbagelata, Genoa (1937–1941); Petróleos Mexicanos (Pemex), Tampico (1941–1942)
- Port of registry: (Mexico) Tampico (1941–1942)
- Builder: Palmers Shipbuilding and Iron Company, Jarrow
- Launched: 28 May 1903
- Completed: November 1903
- Fate: Torpedoed and sunk on 27 June 1942

General characteristics
- Type: Steam tanker
- Tonnage: 7,008 GRT

SS Tuxpam was an oil tanker, in the service of Petroleos Mexicanos, that was sunk on 27 June 1942 by the German submarine U-129.

It was completed in November 1903 as SS Prometheus for Deutsch-Amerikanische Petroleum GmbH, Hamburg. In 1914 it was laid up at New York City and, in December of that year, sold and renamed SS Cushing for Standard Oil of New Jersey, Bayonne. In September 1918, it was requisitioned by the United States Navy as USS Chinampa for the Naval Overseas Transportation Service and returned to her owners in May 1919.

In 1924, it was sold to Italian owners and renamed Americano for Cia Nav. Cisterna SA, Genoa, before her eventual sale, in 1937, to Ditta G.M. Barbagelata, also of Genoa. After being laid up in Tampico, from June 1940 onwards, it was seized by the Mexican government and renamed SS Tuxpam on 8 April 1941.

While sailing unescorted, on 27 June 1942, about 40 miles (64 km) southeast of Gutiérrez Zamora, Veracruz, it was attacked with two torpedoes by the German submarine U-129. However, one torpedo malfunctioned and the U-boat had to dive to evade it. The tanker settled by the stern, after being hit by the other torpedo, but did not sink, so the U-boat surfaced and opened fire with deck guns. Tuxpam caught fire and sank after 52 rounds had been fired.
