= SS Las Choapas =

Coordinates: 20°15′N 96°20′W

History
- Name: Atlas (1898–1941); Las Choapas (1941–1942)
- Owner: Standard Oil of New Jersey (1898-1925); Ditta G.M. Barbagelata, Genoa (1925–1941); Petróleos Mexicanos (Pemex), Tampico (1941–1942)
- Port of registry: (Mexico) Tampico (1941–1942)
- Builder: Delaware River Iron Shipbuilding & Engine Works, Chester, Pennsylvania
- Launched: 17 November 1898
- Completed: December 1898
- Fate: Torpedoed and sunk on 27 June 1942

General characteristics
- Type: Steam tanker
- Tonnage: 2,005 GRT

SS Las Choapas was an oil tanker built in 1898. It was originally commissioned by Standard Oil of New Jersey and built by the Delaware River Iron Ship Building and Engine Works of Chester, Pennsylvania as the SS Atlas. It was the first oil tanker to carry crude oil from Sabine Pass, originating from the Spindletop oil well in Texas on 11 March 1901, bound for the Standard oil refinery in Philadelphia to be tested as a light illuminating purpose. Sold in the 1920s to the Italian company Ditta G.M. Barbagelata, of Genoa. It was seized while docked at Tampico, in Mexico on 8 December 1941 by the Mexican government and renamed, to be operated by Petróleos Mexicanos (Pemex), and homeported in Tampico.

On the afternoon of 27 June 1942, Las Choapas was hit by a single torpedo from the German submarine U-129, commanded by Hans Ludwig-Witt, and sank in flames east of Tecolutla, Veracruz. Another Mexican tanker, the Tuxpam, was sank the same day, also by U-129.
